= List of Latter Day Saint movement topics =

In an effort to bring together pages on various religions, below is a list of articles that are about or reference Latter Day Saint movement topics.

As a rule, the links below should direct to existing articles, not empty pages (non-existent articles), or off-site web pages. If an article is needed, please create a Stub and/or leave a request for additional information on Talk:List of Latter Day Saint movement topics.

== Supercategories of the Latter Day Saint movement ==
Christianity, Gospel, Religion, Religion in the United States, Restorationism (Christian primitivism)

== Latter Day Saint movement in general, as a religion or group of religions ==
Church of Christ (Latter Day Saints), Latter-day Saint, Latter Day Saint, Latter Day Saint movement, LDS Church membership statistics, Mormon, Mormonism, Mormonism and Christianity, Mormonism and Freemasonry, Mormonism and Judaism, Mormon studies, Saint

=== Latter Day Saint denominations ===
A to M: Aaronic Order, Apostolic United Brethren, Church of the Firstborn, Church of the First Born of the Lamb of God, Church of Christ (Cutlerite), Church of Christ (Temple Lot), Church of Christ (Whitmerite), Church of Jesus Christ of Latter Day Saints (Strangite), Church of Jesus Christ, the Bride, the Lamb's Wife, Church of Christ with the Elijah Message, Community of Christ, Fundamentalist Church of Jesus Christ of Latter Day Saints, Kingston clan

N to Z: Remnant Church of Jesus Christ of Latter Day Saints, Restoration Church of Jesus Christ, Restoration Church of Jesus Christ of Latter Day Saints, Restored Church of Jesus Christ, Rigdonite, The Church of Jesus Christ, The Church of Jesus Christ of Latter-day Saints (often shortened to "LDS Church"), True Church of Jesus Christ of Latter Day Saints, True and Living Church of Jesus Christ of Saints of the Last Days

=== Organizations related to the Latter Day Saint movement ===
AMCAP, Bonneville International, Bookcraft, Brigham Young University, Cedar Fort, Deseret Book, Deseret Management Corporation, Deseret Morning News, Deseret News, Ensign Peak Advisors, Excel Entertainment Group, FAIR, FARMS, Intellectual Reserve, John Whitmer Historical Association, KSL, Maxwell Institute, Mormon History Association, Mormon Historic Sites Foundation, Mormon apologetics, Ordain Women, Signature Books

=== Topics that reference the Latter Day Saint movement ===
Accounts of pre-mortal existence, Baptismal clothing, Beehive#Symbolism, Breastplate, Christian countercult movement, Christian denominations, Cunning folk, Fate of the unlearned, Henotheism, Millerites, Religious perspectives on Jesus, Survivalism, Temple robes, Urim and Thummim, Whore of Babylon

== Latter Day Saint doctrines, beliefs, and practices ==
A to M: Adamic language, Animals, Angel, Birth control, Black people, Joseph Smith's views on Black people, Black segregation, Blood atonement, Celestial Kingdom, Chastity, Chosen people, Christian eschatology, Christian view of marriage, Zion, Continuous revelation, Curses of Cain and Ham, Ecumenical council, Exaltation, Ex-Mormon, Excommunication, Evolution, Fast Sunday, fast offering, Gender minorities, Gentile, Gifts of the Spirit in Mormonism, Great and abominable church, Great Apostasy, Holy of Holies, Homosexuality, Interracial marriage, Israelite, Kolob, LGBTQ rights, Marriage, Masturbation, Mixed-orientation marriage, Mormon fundamentalism

N to Z: Native Americans, Outer darkness, Penalty, Phrenology, Plan of Salvation, Polygamy, Pre-Columbian trans-oceanic contact, Premortal life, The Restoration, Revelation, Satan, Seer stone, Separation of church and state, Sexuality, Sexual orientation change efforts, Skin color, Solemn assembly, Sons of perdition, Spiritual wifery, Suicide, Telestial Kingdom, Temple garment, Terrestrial Kingdom, Testimony, Urim and Thummim, Word of Wisdom

=== Latter Day Saint doctrines regarding deity ===
Adam-God theory, Creator god, Elohim, Exaltation, God, God the Father, Godhead, Heavenly Mother, Heavenly Parents, Henotheism, Holy Spirit, Jesus, Nontrinitarianism, Omnipotence, Trinity, Divinization (Christian)

=== Latter Day Saint ordinances, rituals, and symbolism ===
Anointing of the Sick, Baptism for the dead, Baptism in Mormonism, Blood atonement, Eternal Marriage, Marriage, Infant baptism#Denominations and religious groups opposed to infant baptism, Light of Christ, Ordinance, Patriarchal blessing, Rebaptism, Sacrament meeting, Sacrament, Sealing, Second anointing, Temple (Latter Day Saints), Temple (LDS Church), LDS temple architecture

=== Latter Day Saint religious clothing ===
Baptismal clothing, CTR ring, Religious clothing, Temple garment, Veil

=== Latter Day Saint hierarchy ===
A to M: Aaronic priesthood, Anointed Quorum, Apostle, Apostolic succession, Bishop, Chapel, Choir, Church of Christ, Clergy, Deacon, Elder, First Presidency, General authority, High council, High priest, Melchizedek priesthood, Missionary

N to Z: Patriarch, Patriarchal priesthood, Presiding bishop, Presiding Patriarch, President of the Church, President of the Quorum of the Twelve, Priest, Priesthood, Priesthood Correlation Program, Primary, Prophet, seer, and revelator, Quorum, Quorum of the Twelve, Quorums of the Seventy, Relief Society, Stake, Teacher, Ward, World Church Leadership Council

=== General Conferences of the LDS Church ===
Conference Center, General Conference

=== Mormonism and controversy ===
Anti-Mormonism, Black people, Criticism of the LDS Church, Common Latter-day Saint perceptions, Cultural Mormon, Jack Mormons, LGBTQ Mormon suicides, Mormonism and violence, Mormonism Unvailed, Ordain Women, US politics and the LDS Church, Search for the Truth, The God Makers, The God Makers II

=== Latter Day Saint Doctrines concerning the afterlife ===
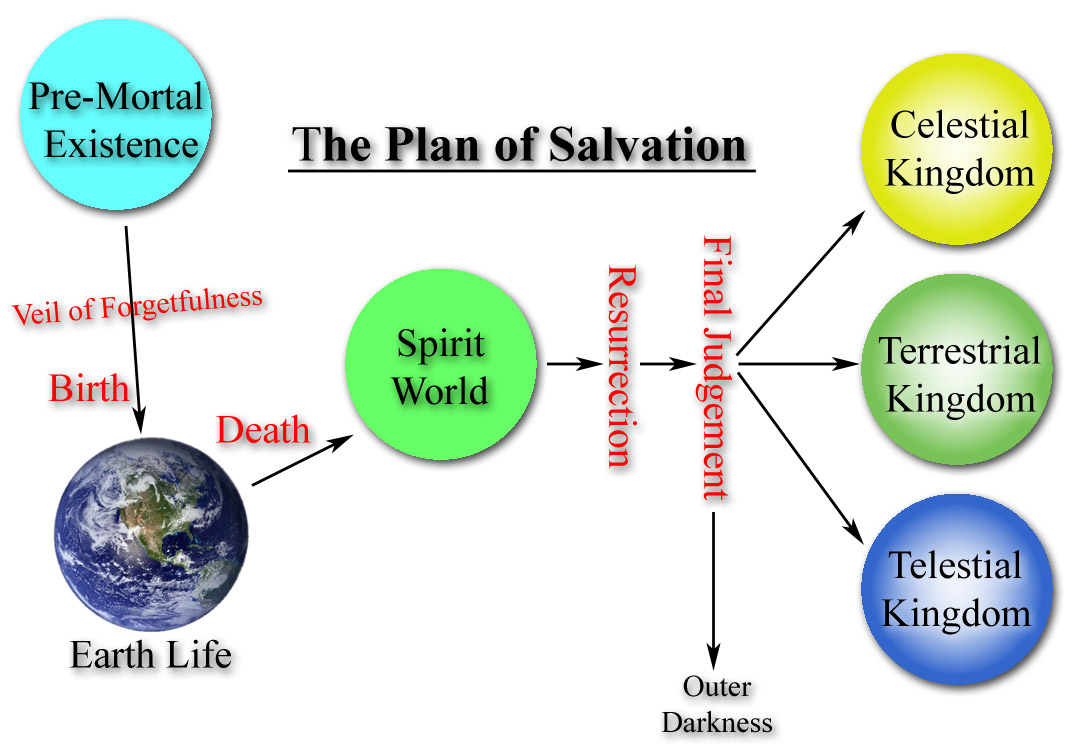
Plan of Salvation

Plan of salvation, Degrees of glory

== Latter Day Saint texts ==
Account of John, Apocrypha, Articles of Faith, Articles of the Church of Christ, Book of Abraham, Book of Commandments, Book of Joseph, Book of Mormon, Book of Moses, Doctrine and Covenants, Encyclopedia of Mormonism, The Family: A Proclamation to the World, Jesus the Christ, Joseph Smith–History, Joseph Smith–Matthew, Joseph Smith Hypocephalus, Joseph Smith Papyri, King Follett discourse, Kirtland Egyptian papers, Lectures on Faith, Nauvoo Expositor, The Peace Maker, Pearl of Great Price, Religious text, Scriptures, Sefer haYashar (midrash), Standard works, Wentworth letter, The Word of the Lord, Word of Wisdom

=== Latter Day Saint movement and the Bible ===
Bible, Biblical canon, Joseph Smith Translation of the Bible, King James Only movement, King James Version, New Testament, Old Testament

=== Book of Mormon ===
Book of Mormon, Gadianton robbers, E. B. Grandin, Record of the Nephites

==== Book of Mormon people ====
Ammon, Book of Mormon rulers, Captain Moroni, Coriantumr (last Jaredite king), Coriantumr (Nephite dissenter), Coriantumr (son of Omer), Enos, Ether, Gadianton robbers, Ishmael, Jaredite, Joseph, King Noah, Laban, Laman and Lemuel, Lamanites, Lamoni, Limhi, List of Book of Mormon groups, List of Book of Mormon people, King Mosiah I, King Mosiah II, Mulek, Nephite, Paanchi (Book of Mormon), Sam, Sariah, Sons of Mosiah, Various Book of Mormon people, Zedekiah, Zeniff, Zenock, Zenos

==== Book of Mormon artifacts ====
Breastplate, Folk magic and the Latter Day Saint movement, Liahona (Book of Mormon), Seer stones in Mormonism, Urim and Thummim

==== Book of Mormon places ====
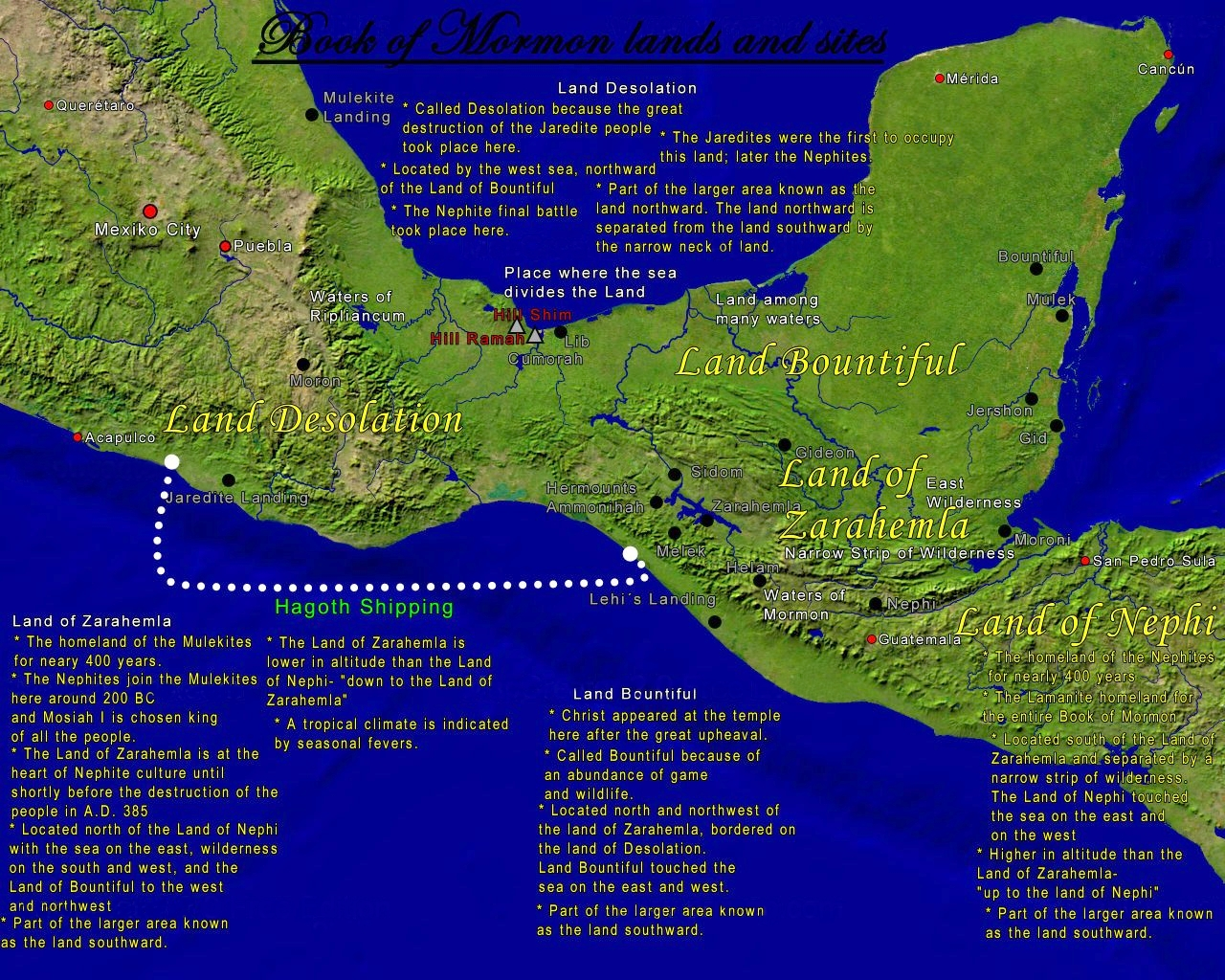
Proposed map of the lands and sites of the Book of Mormon

Bountiful (Book of Mormon), Khirbet Beit Lehi, Nahom, Zarahemla

==== Book of Mormon prophets ====
Abinadi, Alma the Elder, Alma the Younger, Ether (Book of Mormon), Helaman, Jacob (Book of Mormon), Jarom, King Benjamin, Lehi (Book of Mormon), List of Book of Mormon prophets, Mahonri Moriancumer, Mormon (prophet), Nephi, son of Lehi, Omni (Book of Mormon), Samuel the Lamanite, Zenos, Zenock

==== Book of Mormon studies ====
Archaeology and the Book of Mormon, FARMS, Genetics and the Book of Mormon, Golden Plates, Limited geography model, Linguistics, Reformed Egyptian, Studies of the Book of Mormon, The Book of Mormon and the King James Bible

==== Books of the Book of Mormon ====
Lost 116 pages, First Book of Nephi, Second Book of Nephi, Book of Jacob, Book of Enos, Book of Jarom, Book of Omni, Words of Mormon, Book of Mosiah, Book of Alma, Book of Helaman, Third Book of Nephi, Fourth Book of Nephi, Book of Mormon, Book of Ether, Book of Moroni, Large Plates of Nephi, Small Plates of Nephi

=== Latter Day Saint periodicals ===
Dialogue, Elders' Journal, Ensign, Evening and Morning Star, The Friend, Journal of Discourses, Liahona, List of Latter Day Saint periodicals, Messenger and Advocate, Millennial Star, New Era (magazine), Prophwyd y Jubili, Relief Society Magazine, The Seer, Sunstone Magazine, Times and Seasons, Udgorn Seion, Woman's Exponent

== History of the Latter Day Saint movement ==
Dates: 1831 polygamy revelation, 1843 polygamy revelation, 1890 Manifesto

A to M: Amboy Conference, Battle Creek, Utah, Burned-over district, Cart, BYU LGBTQ history, Council of Fifty, Culture of the United States, Danite, Deseret, Deseret alphabet, Evolution, changes in teachings Execution by firing squad, Extermination Order, Transcontinental Railroad, First Vision, Forgery, Hawn's Mill Massacre, History of Christianity, History of the Americas, History of the US, History of the LDS Church, History of the Latter Day Saint movement, History of the Relief Society, Homosexuality, changes in teachings, Honeybee, Indian Placement Program, The Joseph Smith Papers, Joshua tree, Kirtland Safety Society, LGBTQ Mormon history timeline, Miracle of the Gulls, Mormon Battalion, Mormon handcart pioneers, Mormon pioneers, Mormon Reformation, Mormon Trail, Mormon War (1838), Mormonism and women, Mountain Meadows Massacre

N to Z: Nauvoo Expositor, Nauvoo Legion, Oath of vengeance, Pacific Islanders and Mormonism, Persecution of Christians, Polygamy, Priesthood Correlation Program, Rigdon's July 4th oration, Salamander Letter, Salt Sermon, School of the Prophets, Second Great Awakening, Short Creek raid, Slavery, Succession crisis, LDS temple ceremony changes United States religious history University of Deseret, Utah War, Zelph, Zion's Camp

=== Significant dates in the Latter Day Saint movement ===
- December 23, 1805 - birth of Joseph Smith
- Spring of 1820 - Joseph Smith, age 14, was visited by God the Father and His Son, Jesus Christ
- September 21, 1823 - Moroni The Angel visits Joseph Smith
- September 22, 1823 - Joseph Smith is shown the gold plates for the first time
- January 18, 1827 - Joseph Smith marries Emma Hale.
- September 22, 1827 - Joseph Smith receives the gold plates.
- May 15, 1829 - John The Baptist The Angel bestows the Aaron Priesthood upon Joseph Smith and Oliver Cowdery
- June 1829 - Peter James and John The Angels bestow the Melchizedek Priesthood upon Joseph Smith and Oliver Cowdery
- March 26, 1830 - 5,000 copies of the Book of Mormon published in Palmyra, New York
- April 6, 1830 - Church of Jesus Christ of Latter-day Saints founded in Fayette, New York
- July 17, 1831 - The 1831 polygamy revelation in which Christ commands Smith's followers to take “wives of the Lamanites and Nephites [Native Americans].”
- November 13, 1838 - birth of Joseph Fielding Smith
- July 12, 1843 - The 1843 polygamy revelation in which Christ commands polygamy in a “new and an everlasting covenant.”
- June 27, 1844 - Joseph and Hyrum Smith murdered in Carthage Jail, in Carthage, Illinois
- August 8, 1844 - Quorum of Twelve is created as the leading body of the church.
- February 10, 1846 - Many Mormons begin their migration from Nauvoo, Illinois to Great Salt Lake
- July 24, 1847 - Brigham Young arrives in Salt Lake Valley; Salt Lake City established
- 1857 - Mormons abandon Las Vegas
- October 6, 1890 - Wilford Woodruff issues the "1890 Manifesto" halting polygamy.
- 1904 - Joseph F. Smith issues a "Second Manifesto" against polygamy

=== Significant places in the Latter Day Saint movement ===
A to M: Adam-ondi-Ahman, Alberta, Arizona, Auditorium (Community of Christ), Beaver Island (Lake Michigan), Brigham Young University, Brigham Young University–Hawaii, Brigham Young University Jerusalem Center, Burlington, Wisconsin, Caldwell County, Missouri, Chihuahua (state), Church Office Building, LDS Conference Center, Culture of Mexico, Davis County, Utah, Demographics of Greece, Demographics of Kiribati, Demographics of Mexico, Demographics of Niue, Demographics of Palau, Demographics of Swaziland, Demographics of the Marshall Islands, Downtown (Salt Lake City), Endowment House, Far West, Missouri, Finger Lakes, Fort Bridger, Hiram, Ohio, Independence, Missouri, Jackson County, Missouri, Kane County, Utah, Kirtland, Ohio, Lā'ie, Hawai'i, Las Vegas, Nevada, Los Angeles, California, Missouri, Morgan County, Utah

N to Z: Nauvoo, Illinois, Palmyra, Platte River, Rich County, Utah, Salt Lake Assembly Hall, Salt Lake City, Utah, San Bernardino, California, Seagull Monument, Sharon, Vermont, State of Deseret, St. James Township, Michigan, Temple Lot, Temple Square, University of Utah, Utah, Utah Territory, Voree, Wisconsin, Zion

==== Latter Day Saint temples ====
A to M: Apia Samoa Temple, Atlanta Georgia Temple, Bern Switzerland Temple, Cardston Alberta Temple, Chicago Illinois Temple, Freiberg Germany Temple, Guayaquil Ecuador Temple, Hamilton New Zealand Temple, Hong Kong China Temple, Houston Texas Temple, Idaho Falls Idaho Temple, Independence temple, Jordan River Utah Temple, Kirtland Temple, Kona Hawaii Temple, Laie Hawaii Temple, Las Vegas Nevada Temple, Logan Utah Temple, London England Temple, Los Angeles California Temple, Manti Utah Temple, Mesa Arizona Temple

N to Z: Nauvoo Illinois Temple, Nauvoo Temple, Oakland California Temple, Ogden Utah Temple, Orlando Florida Temple, Nuku alofa Tonga Temple, Provo Utah Temple, Raleigh North Carolina Temple, Salt Lake Temple, São Paulo Brazil Temple, Seattle Washington Temple, St. George Utah Temple, Tokyo Japan Temple, Vernal Utah Temple, Washington, D.C. Temple

== Latter Day Saints ==
- List of Latter-day Saints
- Black Mormons
- LGBTQ Mormon people
- A – M: Nephi Anderson, Billy Barty, Earl W. Bascom, Glenn Beck, Steve Benson, Don Bluth, Shawn Bradley, Hugh B. Brown, Orson Scott Card, James C. Christensen, Kresimir Cosik, Stephen Covey, Mitch Davis, Richard Dutcher, Aaron Eckhart, Philo Farnsworth, Brandon Flowers, Rulon Gardner, Marvin Goldstein, Bo Gritz, Orrin Hatch, Jon Heder, Jared Hess, Ken Jennings, Steven E. Jones, Kate Kelly, Gladys Knight, Glen A. Larson, Michael O. Leavitt, Jon Peter Lewis, Robert L. Millet, Dale Murphy,
- N – Z: Donny Osmond, Marie Osmond, Olive Osmond, Anne Perry, Sandy Petersen, William Wines Phelps, D. Michael Quinn, Carmen Rasmusen, Harry Reid, Mitt Romney, Elizabeth Smart (kidnapping), Benjamin Urrutia, Olene S. Walker, Steve Young,
- Groups: Jericho Road, The Osmonds, The Lettermen, The Jets

=== Historians of the Latter Day Saint movement ===
- Church Historian and Recorder, Latter Day Saint Historians,
- A – M: Thomas G. Alexander, Edward H. Anderson, Nephi Anderson, Leonard J. Arrington, Valeen Tippetts Avery, Philip Barlow, Davis Bitton, Fawn M. Brodie, Juanita Brooks, Richard Bushman, Todd Compton, Ron Esplin, Dean C. Jessee, H. Michael Marquardt, Armand Mauss, Dean Lowe May, Dale Morgan,
- N – Z: Linda King Newell, Hugh Nibley, Grant H. Palmer, Gregory Prince, D. Michael Quinn, B. H. Roberts, Stephen E. Robinson, Jan Shipps, Linda Sillitoe, Wallace Stegner, Jerald and Sandra Tanner, Dan Vogel, Wesley P. Walters, Wm. Robert Wright
- Groups or Organizations: FARMS, John Whitmer Historical Association, Mormon Historic Sites Foundation, Mormon History Association, September Six,

=== Notable people in Latter Day Saint history ===
- A – M: Leonard J. Arrington, Valeen Tippetts Avery, Earl W. Bascom, Lilburn Boggs, Gutzon Borglum, Fawn M. Brodie, Juanita Brooks, John Browning, Butch Cassidy, William Henry Chamberlin, J. Reuben Clark, Kresimir Cosik, Henry Eyring, Mark Hofmann, Sonia Johnson, Gordon Jump, Thomas L. Kane, Kate Kelly, Gladys Knight, Jesse Knight, O. Raymond Knight, William Law, Mark Madsen,
- N – Z: Hugh Nibley, Marie Osmond, Natacha Rambova, Stephen E. Robinson, William Shunn, Jerald and Sandra Tanner, Bertel Thorvaldsen
- Groups: September Six,

==== Mormon pioneers ====
- Mormon handcart pioneers
- Mormon pioneers
- Mormon Trail
- Perpetual Emigration Fund
- A – M: Elijah Abel, Milo Andrus, Truman O. Angell, Israel Barlow, John Milton Bernhisel, Samuel Brannan, George Q. Cannon, Martha Hughes Cannon, Albert Carrington, Zebedee Coltrin, William Clayton, Joseph Fielding, William H. Folsom, Emma Lee French, Archibald Gardner, William S. Godbe, Henry Grow, Ephraim Hanks, "Wild Bill" Hickman, Jefferson Hunt, Orson Hyde, William B. Ide, Luke S. Johnson, Heber C. Kimball, Helen Mar Kimball, Dudley Leavitt, John D. Lee, Walker Lewis, Francis M. Lyman, Isaac Morley

=== Latter Day Saint leaders ===
- A – M: Elijah Abel, Milo Andrus, Jason W. Briggs, Hugh B. Brown, Zebedee Coltrin, Oliver Cowdery, Alpheus Cutler, W. A. Draves, Otto Fetting, Zenos H. Gurley, Sr., Martin Harris, George M. Hinkle, Milton R. Hunter, J. Golden Kimball, William Law, John D. Lee, Rex E. Lee, Walker Lewis, William Marks, William E. McLellin,

==== Presidents of the LDS Church ====
- LDS Church presidents
- A – M: Ezra Taft Benson, Heber J. Grant, Gordon B. Hinckley, Howard W. Hunter, Spencer W. Kimball, Harold B. Lee, David O. McKay, Thomas S. Monson,
- N – Z: Russell M. Nelson, Dallin H. Oaks, George Albert Smith, Joseph Smith, Jr., Joseph F. Smith, Joseph Fielding Smith, Lorenzo Snow, John Taylor (1808-1887), Wilford Woodruff, Brigham Young

==== Apostles of the LDS Church ====
- LDS Twelve Apostles
- A – M: Marvin J. Ashton, M. Russell Ballard, David A. Bednar, Ezra T. Benson, Ezra Taft Benson, Albert E. Bowen, Hugh B. Brown, George Q. Cannon, D. Todd Christofferson, J. Reuben Clark, Quentin L. Cook, Richard L. Evans, Henry B. Eyring, James E. Faust, Heber J. Grant, David B. Haight, Robert D. Hales, Alonzo A. Hinckley, Gordon B. Hinckley, Jeffrey R. Holland, Howard W. Hunter, Orson Hyde, Anthony W. Ivins, Luke S. Johnson, Heber C. Kimball, Spencer W. Kimball, Harold B. Lee, Thomas B. Marsh, Bruce R. McConkie, David O. McKay, Thomas S. Monson,
- N – Z: Russell M. Nelson, Dallin H. Oaks, Boyd K. Packer, David W. Patten, L. Tom Perry, Mark E. Petersen, Orson Pratt, Parley P. Pratt, Willard Richards, Richard G. Scott, George A. Smith, George Albert Smith, Hyrum Smith, Hyrum Mack Smith, Joseph F. Smith, Joseph Fielding Smith, William Smith, Reed Smoot, Lorenzo Snow, John Taylor, John Whittaker Taylor, George Teasdale, Dieter F. Uchtdorf, Daniel H. Wells, Joseph B. Wirthlin, Wilford Woodruff, Brigham Young

== LDS Church by Location ==
- LDS Church membership statistics

=== North America ===
Canada • Dominican Republic • Mexico • Membership statistics (United States)

==== United States ====
Alabama • Arizona • Arkansas • California • Colorado • Florida • Georgia • Hawaii • Louisiana • Michigan • Mississippi • North Carolina • Ohio • Oklahoma • South Carolina • Tennessee • Texas • Pennsylvania

==== South Pacific ====
Marshall Islands • Tonga

==== Asia ====
Malaysia • Singapore • South Korea • Sri Lanka

==== Africa ====
Ghana

== Latter Day Saint art and culture ==
Scouting in Utah, C.C.A. Christensen, Fireside, Jack Mormon, Mormon Corridor, LDS cinema, LDS fiction, Pioneer Day, Saints Unified Voices, Sunstone Magazine, Undergarment, Bloggernacle

=== Portrayals of Mormons in popular media ===
- Latter Day Saints in popular culture

"Angels in America: A Gay Fantasia on National Themes" (Tony Kushner), A Study in Scarlet (Arthur Conan Doyle), Brigham Young (movie), Go Ask Alice (Beatrice Sparks), "If This Goes On—" (Robert A. Heinlein), Jay's Journal (Beatrice Sparks), Latter Days, L. E. Modesitt, Jr., The Man with 80 Wives, Orgazmo, The Other Side of Heaven, South Park episode 411: "Probably", South Park episode 712: "All About the Mormons?", Lost Boys (novel) (Orson Scott Card), St Albion Parish News, The Memory of Earth (Orson Scott Card), Big Love (HBO Drama)

=== Latter Day Saint music ===
Collection of Sacred Hymns, I Am A Child Of God, If You Could Hie to Kolob, Joy to the World, Maren Ord, Mormon folk music, Mormon Tabernacle Choir, Music of Utah, O My Father (hymn), The Spirit of God Like a Fire Is Burning, Saints Unified Voices

=== Latter Day Saint films ===
- LDS cinema
  - The Best Two Years, Brigham City, God's Army, Jack Weyland's Charly, Mobsters and Mormons, Out of Step, Pride and Prejudice: A Latter-Day Comedy, The R.M., The Singles Ward
- LDS movies
  - Joseph Smith: Prophet of the Restoration, Legacy, The Testaments of One Fold and One Shepherd

=== Genealogy ===
Family History Library, GEDCOM, Genealogy

== Law related to Mormonism ==
Edmunds Act, Edmunds–Tucker Act, Extermination Order, Morrill Anti-Bigamy Act, Poland Act, Reed Smoot hearings

=== Court decisions regarding the Latter Day Saint movement ===
Cannon v. United States, Clawson v. United States, Davis v. Beason, Davis v. United States, Kirtland Temple Suit, Intellectual Reserve v. Utah Lighthouse Ministry, LDS Church v. United States, Reynolds v. United States, Temple Lot Case

== See also ==
=== Lists ===
List of sects in the Latter Day Saint movement, List of Latter Day Saints, List of presidents of the LDS Church, LDS Twelve Apostles chronology, List of LDS general authorities, List of LDS general officers, List of LDS area seventies, List of Mormon missionary entries by country, List of Zion's Camp participants, List of Latter Day Saint practitioners of plural marriage, List of Joseph Smith's wives, Children of Joseph Smith, List of Brigham Young's wives, List of LDS temples, List of Book of Mormon translations, List of Latter Day Saint periodicals
