= The Church of Jesus Christ of Latter-day Saints in Indonesia =

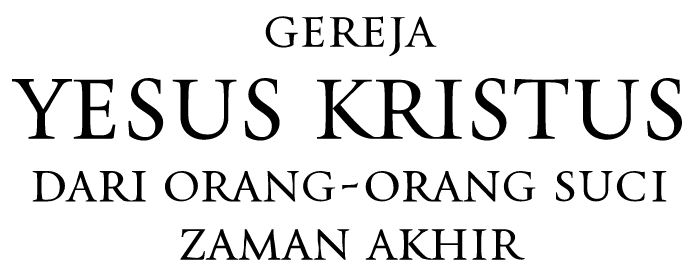
- The church logo in Indonesian
- Area: Asia
- Members: 7,655 (2025)
- Stakes: 2
- Districts: 1
- Wards: 16
- Branches: 8
- Total congregations: 24
- Missions: 1
- Temples: 1 announced
- FamilySearch Centers: 12

The Church of Jesus Christ of Latter-day Saints (LDS Church; Indonesian: Gereja Yesus Kristus dari Orang-Orang Suci Zaman Akhir, officially abbreviated Gereja OSZA) has its presence in Indonesia since 1970, when the first small branch was established in Jakarta. Since then, the LDS Church in Indonesia has grown to more than 7,500 members in 24 congregations.

== History ==
Membership in Indonesia
Year	Members
1974	770
1980	1,411
1989*	4,100
1999	5,339
2009	6,393
2019	7,561
2025	7,655
*Membership was published as a rounded number. Source: Windall J. Ashton; Jim M. Wall, Deseret News, various years, Church Almanac Country Information: Indonesia

Ezra Taft Benson, Bruce R. McConkie and other church leaders visited Indonesia in October 1969, and on October 26, Taft Benson dedicated Indonesia for Missionary work. On January 5, 1970, 6 missionaries, the first in Indonesia, from the Southeast Asia Mission arrived in Jakarta. On February 15, 1970, the Jakarta Branch was organized. The Church was officially recognized by the Republic of Indonesia on August 11, 1970. By the end of the year, missionaries were also working in Bandung and Bogor.

The Java District was created on 16 November 1972. In 1975, Tjan Hardjiono and Suharto became the first two Indonesians to serve full-time missions in their homeland. On July 1, 1975, the Indonesia Jakarta Mission was created. The first president, Hendrik Gout, was born in Java and had joined the Church in 1953 in the Netherlands. The Book of Mormon was printed in the language of Bahasa Indonesia in 1977. In the mid 1990's missionaries began ministering in Sumatra and Sulawesi.

In January 2000, Church President Gordon B. Hinckley met with Indonesia’s President Abdurrahman Wahid and members of his cabinet. In April of 2003, Subandriyo became the first Indonesian sustained and set apart to serve as an Area Authority Seventy where he overseed the church’s office in Jakarta as well as supervising construction efforts in Malaysia, Cambodia, and elsewhere in Southeast Asia.

Anbrey Rees, left, one of 96 volunteers with the Latter-day Saint Charities aboard USNS Mercy assists a patient while in Indonesia during Pacific Partnership 2012. Pacific Partnership is an annual deployment of forces designed to strengthen maritime and humanitarian partnerships during disaster relief operations, while providing humanitarian, medical, dental and engineering assistance to nations of the Pacific.

On October 26, 2019, nearly 1200 members and friends gathered to celebrate the 50th Anniversary of The Church of Jesus Christ of Latter-day Saints in Indonesia. On November 21, 2019, Church President Russell M. Nelson visited Indonesia where he met with the Vice President of Indonesia, Ma'ruf Amin. He also met with church members and others later in the day.

=== Humanitarian Service ===
The Church has completed several humanitarian projects in Indonesia and has provided aid during and following natural disasters. Members of the church donated more than 20,000 hours of service after the October 2010 Merapi volcano eruptions. Following the 2004 tsunami, Church members from around the world donated money to aid Indonesians, and schools have been built. The LDS Church provided funding, engineering, technical advice and supervision for providing water to 28,000 Indonesians. In addition missionaries and church members are encouraged to voluntarily serve in their communities.

== Stakes and district ==
Stake Centers in Indonesia (May 2025)
Green = Stake
Orange = District
Purple = meetinghouse not part of stake or district

As of September 2026, 2 stakes, a district, and four branches not part of a stake or district were located in Indonesia:

Jakarta Indonesia Stake

- Bandung Ward
- Bekasi 1st Ward
- Bekasi 2nd Ward
- Bogor 1st Ward
- Bogor 2nd Ward
- Jakarta 1st Ward
- Jakarta 2nd Ward
- Jakarta 3rd Ward (English)
- Tangerang 1st Ward
- Tangerang 2nd Ward

Surakarta Indonesia Stake

- Banjarsari Ward
- Jebres Ward
- Magelang Branch
- Semarang Ward
- Solo 1st Ward
- Solo 2nd Ward
- Yogyakarta Ward

Surabaya Indonesia District

- Malang Branch*
- Surabaya 1st Branch*
- Surabaya 2nd Branch*

Other Locations

- Bali Branch*
- Indonesia Jakarta Dispersed Members Unit*
- Manado Branch*
- Medan Branch*

\*All congregations not in a stake, regardless of size, are branches within a mission. The Indonesia Jakarta Dispersed Members Unit serves individuals and families in Indonesia not in proximity to a meetinghouse.

In addition, a church Employment Resource Center is located in Jakarta.

== Missions ==
Indonesia was part of the Southeast Asia Mission upon arrival of the first missionaries in 1970. On 1 July 1975, the Indonesia Jakarta Mission was created. Due to government restrictions between 1978 and 1980, the mission was discontinued in December of 1980 and missionary efforts were coordinated by the Singapore Mission. The Indonesia Jakarta Mission was re-opened in July 1985 with Effian Kadarusman as president, who served for four years until 1989 when the mission once became part of the Singapore mission due to government restrictions. The Indonesia Jakarta Mission was re-opened again in 1995.

=== Timor-Leste ===
The LDS Church reports having a single congregation, Dili Branch, in Timor-Leste. The Indonesia Jakarta Mission directly administers to that branch.

== Temples ==
Indonesia was part of the Hong Kong China Temple district until the completion of the Bangkok Thailand Temple in 2023. A temple in Singapore was announced to be constructed on April 4, 2021. In the April 2023 General Conference, it was announced that a temple would be constructed in Jakarta, Indonesia.

320. Jakarta Indonesia Temple (Site announced); Official website; News & images	
Location: Announced: Size:	Jakarta, Indonesia; 2 April 2023 by Russell M. Nelson; 50,000 sq ft (4,600 m^{2}) on a 1.5-acre (0.61 ha) site

== See also ==
- Religion in Indonesia
