= Sanjiv Bhattacharya =

British journalist, based in the US

Sanjiv Bhattacharya is a British journalist, based in the US. He was born in London and graduated from the University of Cambridge where he studied philosophy. His book Secrets and Wives: The Hidden World of Mormon Polygamy explores the polygamy west, including the Kingstons, who for over a century have also practiced incest breeding techniques, believing they are descendants from Abraham and Jesus.

A former features editor and current contributing editor for British GQ, he has written for several magazines and newspapers including The Observer, The Daily Telegraph, The Times, The Los Angeles Times, Marie Claire, Maxim and Details. He writes generally about social issues, fringe groups, the entertainment industry and boxing.

In 2006, he wrote and presented the Channel Four documentary The Man With 80 Wives, about Warren Jeffs, the fugitive prophet of the Fundamentalist Church of Jesus Christ of Latter Day Saints. He was subsequently commissioned by Simon & Schuster to write a book of investigative journalism about Mormon polygamy.

In 2008, he was appointed Editor of GQ India.

He lives in Los Angeles, California. In 2026 he appears in London Falling: A Mysterious Death in a Gilded City and a Family's Search for Truth by Patrick Radden Keefe (Doubleday 2026). See chapter 10 "The Great Sham." In that chapter, Sanjiv recounts meeting Akbar Shamji at Cambridge, playing in a funk band called Muthafunk, and after losing his job at GQ, moving to Los Angeles on a whim in 2000. He was to work with Akbar Shamji on a record label called Soullife. Sanjiv is quite open about the partying and desultory life in Los Angeles in that time period. Keefe adeptly ends the chapter with a wry comment from Sanjiv about trusting Akbar Shamji. "in Hindi, the suffix -ji at the end of a word is an honorific. In later years, Sanjiv would ponder the little coincidences that sometimes imbue life with bitter poetry. The clue was right there all along, in his friend's name: Akbar Sham-ji. Akbar, the great sham."
