= The Church of Jesus Christ of Latter-day Saints in Singapore =

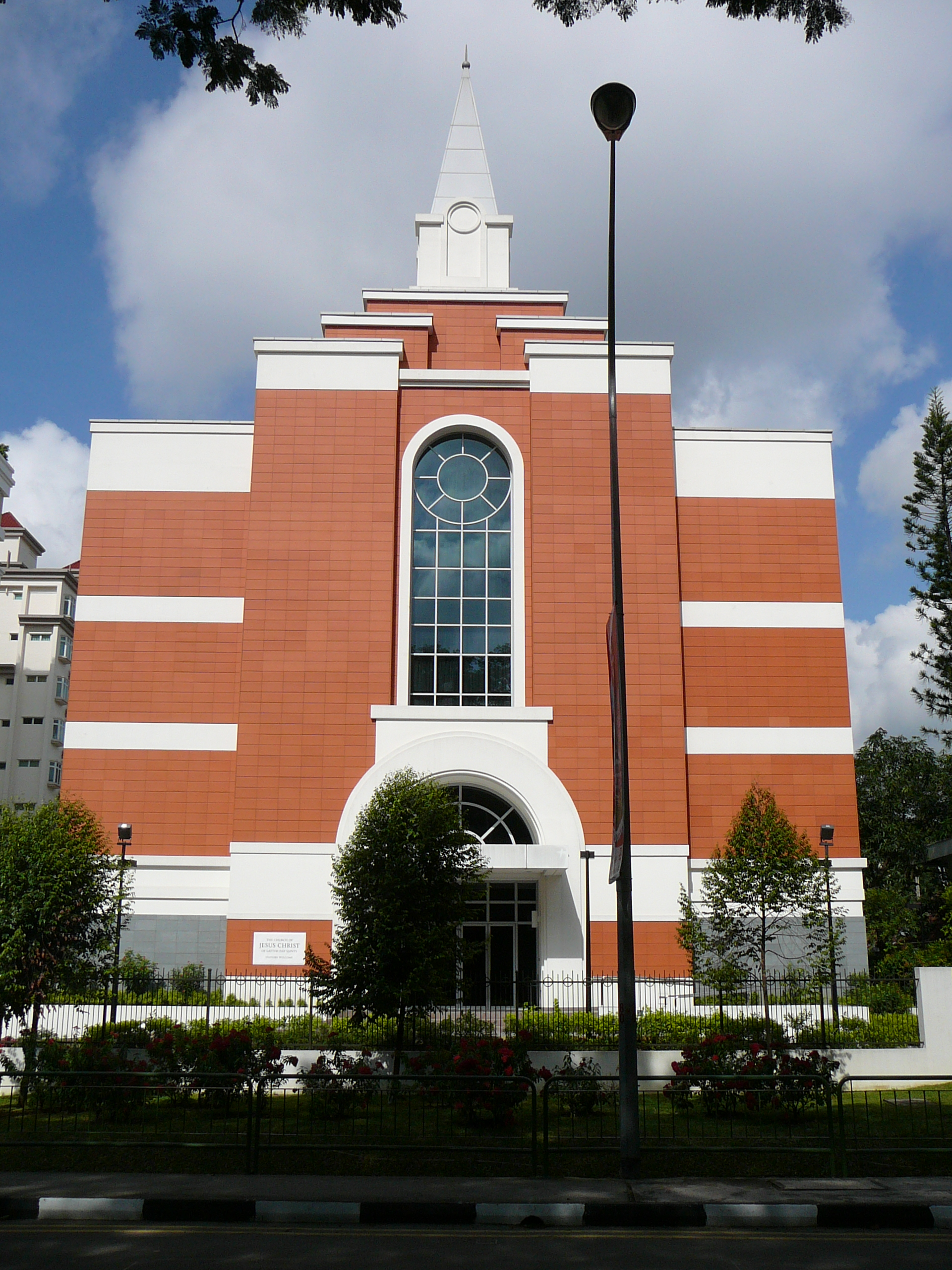
- Singapore Stake Center.
- Area: Asia
- Members: 3,262 (2025)
- Stakes: 1
- Wards: 6
- Missions: 1
- Temples: 1 under construction
- FamilySearch Centers: 1

The Church of Jesus Christ of Latter-day Saints in Singapore refers to the Church of Jesus Christ of Latter-day Saints (LDS Church) and its members in Singapore.

== History ==
Membership in Singapore
| Year | Membership |
|---|---|
| 1963 | 3 |
| 1970 | 100 |
| 1976 | 309 |
| 1980 | 660 |
| 1989* | 1,400 |
| 1999 | 2,099 |
| 2009 | 2,890 |
| 2019 | 3,439 |
| 2025 | 3,262 |
*Membership was published as an estimated or rounded number.

In May 1963, Gordon B. Hinckley, then a member of the Quorum of the Twelve Apostles, along with Jay A Quealy, president of the Southern Far East Mission, visited Singapore and found three Latter-day Saints from the British military residing there. Members from Hong Kong also began holding church meetings in Singapore and by 1964, the number attending had grown to eleven. Missionaries began visiting in the mid 1960s and the first assigned full-time missionaries arrived in March 1968. On October 12 of the same year, the church established its first congregation in Singapore, with John McSweeney as president. The Southeast Asia Mission, which included Singapore, was created in November 1969.

In 1970, when approximately 100 Latter-day Saints lived in Singapore, government officials restricted preaching and visas for missionaries. Progress continued through the efforts of local members and the Singapore Mission was created in 1974, with G. Carlos Smith as the mission president. By 1976, church membership in Singapore totaled 309. Singapore was re-opened to full-time missionaries in January 1980. Five years later, church membership in Singapore was 960. By 1990, the church had constructed three meetinghouses, which served approximately 1,300 members.

In August 1992, Jon Huntsman, Jr., a Latter-day Saint who had served as a missionary in Taiwan, was sworn into office as the United States Ambassador to Singapore. By mid-1993, church membership in Singapore totaled 1,750 in seven congregations.

In 2021, church president Russell M. Nelson announced that a temple would be built in Singapore.

== Stake and Congregations ==
LDS Church Locations as of May, 2025
Green = Stake Center and adjacent Meetinghouses
Purple = meetinghouse
Yellow = Announced Temple
(FHC) = Family History Center
The Singapore Temple is located adjacent to the Jurong meetinghouse

As of May 2025, the Singapore stake consisted of the following congregations:

- Compassvale Ward
- Jurong Ward
- Newton Ward
- Sembawang Ward
- Singapore 3rd Ward (Tagalog)
- Singapore YSA Ward

== Mission ==
In the 1960s, Singapore was part of the Southern Far East Mission. The Southeast Asia Mission, which included Singapore, was created in November 1969. It was renamed the Singapore Mission on July 24, 1974. The mission was discontinued and transferred to Indonesia Jakarta Mission in July 1978, but reopened on January 1, 1980. The Singapore Mission is currently the LDS Church's only mission in Singapore and ministers to the entirety of Singapore and Malaysia.

== Temples ==
Prior to 1984, local members in Singapore had to travel long distances internationally, frequently to the Tokyo Japan Temple or the United States, to attend temple services. From 1984 to 1996, Singapore was serviced by the newly dedicated Manila Philippines Temple and occasionally the Taipei Taiwan Temple. From 1996 to 2023, Singapore was part of the Hong Kong China Temple district until the completion of the nearer Bangkok Thailand Temple. Plans to construct a dedicated Singapore Temple were announced on 4 April 2021. The groundbreaking ceremony was held on 28 June 2025, with completion expected between 2027 and 2028.

| 263. Singapore Temple (Under construction); Official website; News & images | |
| Location: Announced: Groundbreaking: Size: Notes: | Singapore; 4 April 2021 by Russell M. Nelson; 28 June 2025 by Kelly R. Johnson; 18,000 sq ft (1,700 m^{2}) on a 1-acre (0.40 ha) site A meetinghouse and arrival center will be constructed on site behind the temple. |

== See also ==
- Religion in Singapore
