= Mormonism and Nicene Christianity =

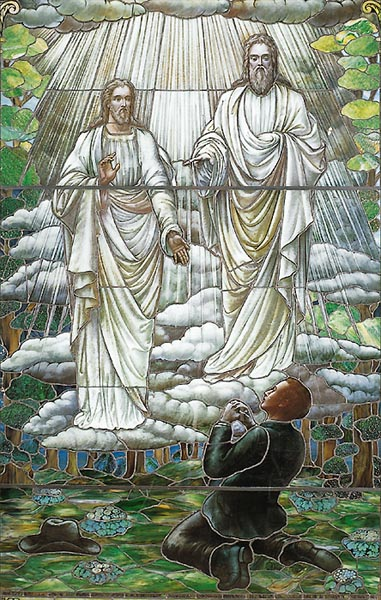
Depiction of God the Father and Jesus Christ as two distinct beings appearing to Joseph Smith, Jr. during his "First Vision", reflecting Mormonism's non-trinitarian theology.

Mormonism and Nicene Christianity (often called mainstream Christianity) have a complex theological, historical, and sociological relationship. Latter-day Saints express their doctrines using biblical terminology. They have similar views about the nature of Jesus's atonement, bodily resurrection, and Second Coming as mainstream Christians. Nevertheless, most Latter-day Saints do not accept the doctrine of the Trinity as codified in the Nicene Creed of 325 and the Nicene-Constantinopolitan Creed of 381. Although Latter-day Saints consider the Protestant Bible to be holy scripture, they do not believe in biblical inerrancy. They have also adopted additional scriptures that they believe to have been divinely revealed to Joseph Smith, including the Book of Mormon, the Doctrine and Covenants, and the Pearl of Great Price. Latter-day Saints practice baptism, confirmations and celebrate the sacrament of the Lord's Supper, but they also participate in other religious sacraments.

Focusing on differences, some Christians consider Mormonism non-Christian; others, focusing on similarities, consider it to be a Christian denomination. Opinions differ among scholars of religion on whether to categorize Mormonism as a separate branch of Christianity or as a "fourth Abrahamic religion" (alongside Judaism, Christianity, and Islam). Latter-day Saints do not accept non-Mormon baptism and most non-Mormon Christians do not accept Mormon baptism. Latter-day Saints regularly proselytize individuals within the Christian tradition, and some traditional Christians, especially evangelicals, proselytize Latter-day Saints. Some view Mormonism as a form of Christianity, but distinct enough from traditional Christianity so as to form a new religious tradition, much as Christianity is more than just a sect of Judaism.

The early Mormonism that originated with Joseph Smith in the 1820s shared strong similarities with some elements of 19th-century American Protestantism. Latter-day Saints believe that God, through Smith and his successors, restored various doctrines and practices that were lost from the original Christianity taught by Jesus. For example, Smith, as a result of his "First Vision", primarily rejected the Nicene doctrine of the Trinity and instead taught that God the Father, his son Jesus, and the Holy Ghost are three distinct "personages". While the largest Mormon denomination, The Church of Jesus Christ of Latter-day Saints (LDS Church), acknowledges its differences with mainstream Christianity, it also focuses on its commonalities, such as its focus on faith in Jesus, following the teachings of Jesus, the miracle of the atonement, and many other doctrines.

== Doctrinal comparison ==
While historians recognize the roots of Mormonism in American Protestantism and the Second Great Awakening of the 1820s and 1830s, Mormonism has also been identified as "a radical departure from traditional" (i.e., mainline) Protestant Christianity and a "profoundly primitivist tradition." Nevertheless, Mormonism falls within the scope of the Evangelical Protestantism of the Second Great Awakening in the United States (1800–1840). The conception of God in early Mormonism was very similar to the conception of the Christian God held within Protestant Christianity, although early Latter-day Saints had already begun developing their own distinct doctrine.

=== Early Joseph Smith era ===
Mormonism arose in the 1820s during a period of radical reform and experimentation within American Protestantism, and Mormonism is integrally connected to the burned-over district, a hotbed of American new religious movements of the time. As a form of Christian primitivism, the new faith was one among several contemporary religious movements that claimed to restore Christianity to its condition at the time of the Twelve Apostles.

==== The Book of Mormon ====
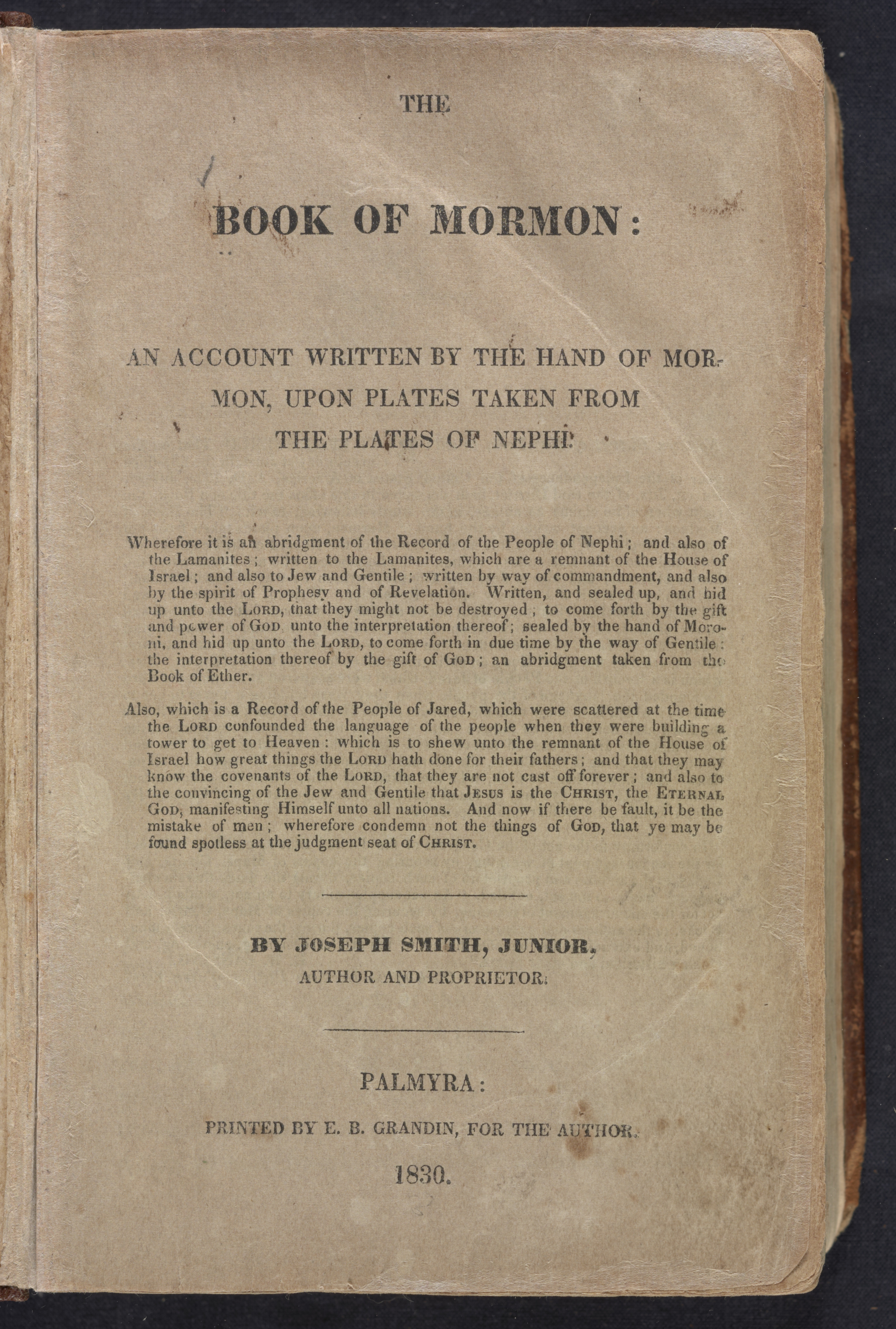
Cover page of The Book of Mormon from an original 1830 edition, by Joseph Smith (Image from the U.S. Library of Congress Rare Book and Special Collections Division.)

The Book of Mormon (1830), which codifies the earliest Mormon doctrine, was intended, in part, to settle ongoing doctrinal disputes among contemporary Christian denominations and to create a single shared theology. Joseph Smith believed in the Bible and shared the Protestant tradition that the Bible (excluding the biblical apocrypha) was initially revealed by God to humanity and had contained the "fulness of the gospel." Nevertheless, Smith believed the Bible of his era had degenerated from its original form. Smith blamed the Catholic Church for the loss of biblical books and for introducing corruptions and obfuscations in the biblical text. Smith said that the Book of Mormon revealed "plain and precious things that had been taken away" from the Bible. Smith also completed an unpublished revision of the Bible in 1833, which he said corrected many of these errors and added inspired commentary. Smith endowed the Book of Mormon with status equal to the Bible.

==== Nature of God ====
The faith's earliest theology, as reflected in the Book of Mormon and contemporaneous writings by Joseph Smith, was an unsophisticated version of Trinitarianism or Monarchianism. According to Kurt Widmer, "early Latter-day Saints were reacting against a heavily intellectualized and theologized Trinitarian concept of God", and the nature of God was not at first of central importance to Smith.

In 1834, Smith and his associate Sidney Rigdon developed the Lectures on Faith that they later incorporated into the Doctrine and Covenants (1835). These lectures described "two personages" in the heavens: the Father, "a personage of spirit, glory, and power," and the Son, "a personage of tabernacle" who "received the fulness of the glory of the Father—possessing the same mind with the Father, which mind is the Holy Spirit." This has sometimes been described as a form of Binitarianism.

==== Other points of doctrine ====
Early Mormon soteriology, although not following a preexisting tradition, was generally Arminian in tendency. Early Mormonism agreed with Methodists and the Disciples of Christ in rejecting Calvinistic doctrines in favor of Christian perfection and free will (called agency). Also, while the Book of Mormon affirmed the doctrine of original sin, it also agrees with other Arminian denominations that children are incapable of sin and in a state of grace.

Like other Christian primitivists, Smith rejected the authority of normative Christianity's interpretation of the Bible—though he also maintained (as did the Shakers) that interpretation of the Bible should be guided by new and continuing revelation. Initially, the authority of Smith's faith was based on correct doctrine and his own claim of prophethood. Then, during the early 1830s, Smith added to this authority apostolic succession, represented by angelic apostles and prophets who Smith said had ordained him.

=== Latter Joseph Smith era ===
From the mid-1830s to his death in 1844, Smith continued introducing ideas and practices that differed significantly from traditional Protestantism. First, Smith pressed Christian perfection beyond Protestant orthodoxy. He followed non-Protestant Christians in rejecting the doctrine of justification by faith alone and moved toward universalism by introducing a hierarchy of three glorious heavens, in which even the wicked had a place. In the late 1830s, Smith introduced baptism for the dead by proxy as a means for "unredeemed souls" to accept salvation in the afterlife, and he also taught that the ordinance of marriage was required to reach the highest level of salvation. Smith also introduced a second anointing ritual, after which a participant was guaranteed virtually unconditional salvation. This has been seen as an attempt to retain the Calvinistic ideas of assured salvation.

In his later years, Smith also differed from traditional Protestantism in his views on the nature of God and humanity. Eventually, Smith reduced the difference between God and man to one degree: Both God and man are coeternal and uncreated, teaching that humans could progress to an exalted state in which they became coequal with a material, plural God— himself a glorified man existing within time. Smith taught that both God the Father and Jesus were distinct beings with physical bodies, and that the Holy Spirit was a personage of Spirit. Because God had once been a man who had risen to a high position in Heaven, humans, too, could progress to godhood. Such teaching implied a vast hierarchy of gods who would rule kingdoms of inferior intelligence and so forth in an eternal hierarchy. Unlike the god of traditional Christianity, the god envisioned by Smith did not create the eternal spirits of humanity—he only organized them. He provided them with a plan to follow in his footsteps. God was God not because he was an ex nihilo creator, but because he had the greatest intelligence.

=== Pioneer Mormonism ===
After Smith's death, his successor Brigham Young and others built upon Smith's late teachings and introduced more significant doctrinal innovations. The resulting religious tradition defined the Mormonism of the Mormon pioneer era in the 19th century. An important part of this pioneer Mormonism is the Adam–God doctrine, which became the most prominent (but not exclusive) theology of 19th-century Mormonism. Young taught that God the Father was Adam, a mortal man resurrected and exalted to godhood. Proponents of this doctrine believed that "Father Adam", the subordinate member of a three-god council, created the earth. Adam was, in this schema, both the common ancestor and the father of all spirits born on the earth. After ascending again to his heavenly throne, Adam returned to physically father Jesus by Mary.

Some elements of Mormonism from the pioneer era, including polygamy and the Adam–God doctrine, were renounced around the turn of the 20th century by the LDS Church. However, these elements have been retained within the small branch of Mormonism known as Mormon fundamentalism.

=== Modern LDS Church orthodoxy ===
Near the turn of the 20th century, there was a movement to codify LDS theology with official statements of Church leaders—which served to quash speculative ideas that persisted as sub rosa concepts among some Latter-day Saints. This coincided with an effort to stop new plural marriages—mostly forbidden in 1890 and completely forbidden after 1904. Prominent Latter-day Saints such as Joseph F. Smith, John A. Widstoe, and James E. Talmage formulated the outlines of Mormon orthodoxy with publications that significantly narrowed the realm of acceptable speculative Mormon theology.

==== Nature of God and humanity ====
In traditional Christianity, as expressed in the Athanasian Creed, God is conceived both as a unity and a Trinity: God the Father, God the Son and God the Holy Spirit are three hypostases of one uncreated substance—one God, omnipotent, co-equal and co-eternal. Though modern Latter-day Saints share with traditional Christianity a belief that the object of their worship comprises three distinct persons, Mormon theology disagrees with the idea that the three persons are the same substance and the same God.

Latter-day Saints are constrained by the language of the Book of Mormon to regard the Father, Son, and Holy Spirit as "one" but consider this a social unity rather than ontological. Latter-day Saints, since the time of Joseph Smith, have regarded God as plural. They regard God the Father as the biblical god Elohim, and they believe that the Son, a distinct being, is both Jesus and the biblical God Jehovah. The two of them, together with the Holy Spirit, are believed to form a heavenly council that Latter-day Saints call the "Godhead." They are "one" in the sense of being lovingly united in purpose or will, a view sometimes called social trinitarianism. Unlike traditional Christians, modern Latter-day Saints generally regard the Son as subordinate to the Father.

Latter-day Saints believe that Heavenly Father and Mother are the parents to all spirits.

While Latter-day Saints might agree with the statement that the Father and the Son are "uncreated", their understanding of "creation" differs from that of traditional Christianity. Latter-day Saints do not believe, as do traditional Christians, that God created the universe ex nihilo (from nothing). Rather, to Latter-day Saints, the act of creation is to organize or reorganize pre-existing matter or intelligence. Traditional Christians consider God to be a "necessary being", meaning that he cannot not exist, while all other creations are "contingent beings". In Mormonism, by contrast, God created the universe and everything in it from existing matter.

The Mormon sense of "eternal" differs from traditional Christians, who believe God's eternal nature exists outside of space and time. Very few in the LDS Church situate God outside of space and time. However, Mormon scripture states that "time is measured only unto man." They believe that the Father, Son, and Holy Spirit are co-eternal, and they believe that all of humanity is co-eternal with the Father in the sense that the underlying spark of all intelligence has always existed (in space and time) and never was created.

Latter-day Saints believe that God is scrutable through revelation, and anthropomorphic, in that he has a physical body of flesh and bone. Latter-day Saints believe in traditional Christian notions that God is omnipotent and omniscient, and also believe that "[e]ven God's omnipotence must conform to the attributes of truth and wisdom and justice and mercy".

==== Salvation ====
Although the LDS Church has never officially adopted a doctrine of soteriology, most Latter-day Saints accept the doctrine of salvation formulated by B. H. Roberts, John A. Widstoe and James E. Talmage in the early 20th century. In contrast to early Latter-day Saints, modern Latter-day Saints generally reject the idea of original sin. The Fall of Man is viewed not as a curse but as part of God's Plan of Salvation.

Latter-day Saints believe they must not only have faith and repent but also be baptized (by immersion and by an authorised priesthood holder within the Church) and bring forth good works. Latter-day Saints consider their weekly Eucharist (the Sacrament) as a means of renewing their baptismal covenant and being repeatedly cleansed from sin. Although the grace of Jesus plays a role in salvation, each Mormon must "work out his own salvation" through Jesus Christ. Latter-day Saints believe that people not baptized during their lifetime may accept salvation in the afterlife through the Mormon practice of baptism for the dead. Although the Book of Mormon rejected the doctrine of universal reconciliation, Smith taught that damnation was a temporary state (for all but the Sons of Perdition) from which the wicked would ultimately escape after they had paid for their sins, to be resurrected into one of the two lesser kingdoms of glory.

Mormonism takes an extended view of Christian perfection, asserting that through the grace of Jesus, Latter-day Saints may become perfectly sanctified and thereby literally become gods or achieve a state known as exaltation. To achieve exaltation, Latter-day Saints must remain obedient to the teachings of Jesus, receive all the ordinances (or sacraments), which includes baptism, confirmation, receiving the Melchizedek priesthood (for males), the temple endowment, and being sealed to a spouse. Smith also introduced a second anointing ritual, whose participants, upon continued obedience, were sealed to exaltation, but this was not an essential ordinance.

==== Role of the church ====
Like Catholicism and Orthodoxy, Mormonism assigns considerable authority to church tradition and ecclesiastical leadership. Latter-day Saints emphasize the authority of an institutional church, which in all Mormon denominations derives from the Church of Christ established by Joseph Smith in 1830. Latter-day Saints believe this church to be the "only true and living church". Below Jesus as the head of the church is a single man chosen as the "Prophet" who holds the position of President of the Church. The Prophet has been compared to the Pope in Catholicism because both, within their respective faiths, are regarded as the leading authority.

Latter-day Saints also believe in apostolic succession. However, Latter-day Saints believe the Catholic line of succession is invalid because of a Great Apostasy that occurred soon after the era of the apostles. The line of succession was restored through Joseph Smith when biblical prophets and apostles appeared to him and ordained him through the laying on of hands with lost priesthood authority. Thus, Latter-day Saints believe that non-Mormon clergy has no heavenly authority and that sacraments performed by clergy of other faiths are of no effect in the eyes of God. Latter-day Saints reject the Protestant doctrine of the "priesthood of all believers", but they consider all confirmed Latter-day Saints to have the "Gift of the Holy Ghost" (also conveyed by the laying on of hands), which entitles believers to spiritual gifts but to no ecclesiastical authority.

=== Mormon neo-orthodoxy ===
Some claim that in the late-20th century, a conservative movement within the LDS Church (called "Mormon neo-orthodoxy" on the analogy of an earlier Protestant neo-orthodoxy) emphasized the Book of Mormon over later revelations and embraced original sin, an absolute, eternal, and unchanging God, a pessimistic assessment of human nature, and a doctrine of salvation by grace rather than by works.

Despite the book's importance to early Mormonism, early Latter-day Saints rarely quoted from the Book of Mormon in their speeches and writings. Joseph Smith's later teachings and writings focused on the Bible, including his own revision and commentary of the Authorized King James Version. The book was not regularly cited in Mormon conferences until the 1980s. Within the LDS Church, a movement to re-emphasize the Jesus-based elements of Mormonism in the 1980s included a rediscovery of the Book of Mormon. In 1982, the church subtitled the book "Another Testament of Jesus Christ" to emphasize that Jesus was a central focus of the book and that the book is intended to be a complement to the Bible.

Although Mormon neo-orthodox scholars say they have faced "resistance" from Mormon orthodoxy, some perceive the direction of the movement to be consistent with a broader trend among the LDS hierarchy to present Mormonism in terms more acceptable to mainline Christianity. Critics argue that because Mormonism is not based on an authoritative systematic theology, and much of Mormon scripture was written when Mormonism was "essentially trinitarian", Mormon leaders and apologists have been able to deny that at least some of 20th-century orthodox Mormonism represents official Mormon doctrine. It is also claimed that LDS Church publications and a few Mormon scholars have increasingly used the language of Nicene Christianity to describe the nature of God.

The existence and implications of the movement continue to be debated. Theologian Richard Mouw asserts that Latter-day Saints have downplayed some of its more "heretical" doctrines to obtain a more effective dialogue with other Christians. Terryl Givens, a Mormon theologian, has rejected such claims, asserting instead that many Mormon "heresies" eventually become more accepted by much of Christianity. He consequently contends that "Christian consensus is fluid and, in some cases, has lagged behind the Mormon model."

== Christian views about Latter-day Saints ==
In the past, most mainstream Christian denominations rejected Mormonism outright, frequently calling it a cult and characterizing it as "non-Christian". According to Jan Shipps, during the 1950s the attitude of mainstream Christians towards Mormonism changed from "vilification" to "veneration", with emphasis on positive Mormon traits such as "family orientation, clean-cut optimism, honesty and pleasant aggressiveness".

Richard Abanes attributes an "increasing lack of delineation between (Mormonism and mainstream Christianity)" to three primary causes:

1. the willingness of some Mormon leaders to be less than candid about more controversial aspects of LDS history and theology,
2. a trend among some Mormon scholars to make LDS belief sound more mainstream, and
3. an evolution of Mormon thought toward doctrinal positions nearer those of evangelicals.

Richard Bushman asserts that, for many people, Mormonism "conjures up an assortment of contradictory images". One set of images suggests that Latter-day Saints are "happy, uncomplicated, kindly and innocent—if perhaps naive". In contrast to this set of images, Bushman describes a set of associations that focuses on "a powerful religious hierarchy controlling the church from the top". This perspective views Latter-day Saints as "secretive, clannish and perhaps dangerous", often labeling the movement as a "cult rather than a church".

Mormon apologist Stephen E. Robinson argued that Latter-day Saints are labeled heretics "for opinions and practices that are freely tolerated in other mainstream denominations".

Mormonism has a particularly rocky relationship with American evangelical Christianity and the Catholic Church. The Catholic Church declared Mormonism to be "non-Christian". Richard Mouw, President of Fuller Theological Seminary, an evangelical school in Pasadena, California, stated in an opinion piece for CNN, "[t]hose of us who have made the effort to engage Latter-day Saints in friendly and sustained give-and-take conversations have come to see them as good citizens whose life of faith often exhibits qualities that are worthy of the Christian label, even as we continue to engage in friendly arguments with them about crucial theological issues." William Saletan has been more blunt about this, stating "[w]hy don't we challenge anti-Mormonism? Because it's the prejudice of our age." Joe Scarborough has drawn analogies between the Pharisees in the New Testament and prominent evangelical religious leader Robert Jeffress calling Mormonism a cult.

=== Non-recognition of Mormon rites ===
==== LDS perspective ====
Latter Day Saint history comes from the position that other churches were the product of the apostasy, as referenced in the Bible. Latter-day Saints view other Christian churches as teaching some truth, doing good works, and acknowledge their strong faith in Christ. However, Latter-day Saints also maintain that all other churches lack the divine authority to perform the ordinances of the gospel because of the Great Apostasy. The LDS Church and most other Latter Day Saint factions do not accept the baptisms of other Christian denominations as valid.

==== Traditional perspective ====
The Catholic, Orthodox, and Protestant branches of Christianity reject Mormon claims of additional scriptures, and of the prophetic office of Joseph Smith and other Mormon leaders; they disagree with Mormon charges that they have committed apostasy. Doctrines such as the beliefs about the existence of prophets in early American civilizations, which are unique to Mormon theology and not found in the teachings of other Christian churches are also causes of disagreement. Nonetheless, many Christian denominations treat Latter-day Saints with respect, while not minimizing the differences in belief.

In 2001, the Vatican's Congregation of the Doctrine of the Faith declared that LDS baptisms are invalid, and therefore null. Because of differences in Mormon and Catholic beliefs concerning the Trinity, the Catholic Church stated that Mormon baptism was not the baptism that Christ instituted. In comparison, the Catholic Church does not require rebaptism for converts to Catholicism from most Protestant or Orthodox churches. The Catholic Bishop of Salt Lake City, George Hugh Niederauer, stated that this ruling "should not be understood as either judging or measuring a spiritual relationship between Jesus Christ and the LDS Church".

The Presbyterian Church USA, the largest Presbyterian body in the United States, publishes a brochure describing the LDS Church as follows:

The Church of Jesus Christ of Latter-day Saints, like the Presbyterian Church (U.S.A.), declares allegiance to Jesus. Latter-day Saints and Presbyterians share use of the Bible as scripture, and members of both churches use common theological terms. Nevertheless, Mormonism is a new and emerging religious tradition distinct from the historic apostolic tradition of the Christian Church, of which Presbyterians are a part. ... It is the practice of the Presbyterian Church (U.S.A.) to receive on profession of faith those coming directly from a Mormon background and to administer baptism. ... Presbyterian relationships with Latter-day Saints have changed throughout the twentieth century. By God's grace they may change further.

The Evangelical Lutheran Church in America, the largest Lutheran body in the US, notes that Lutherans have been among those Christians who do not re-baptize other baptized Christians; however, it publishes the following statement on the recognition of Mormon baptisms:

Although Mormons may use water—and lots of it—and while they may say "Father, Son, and Holy Spirit", their teaching about the nature of God is substantially different from that of orthodox, creedal Christianity. Because the Mormon understanding of the Word of God is not the same as the Christian understanding, it is correct to say that Christian Baptism has not taken place.

In its 2000 General Conference, the United Methodist Church decided not to recognize Latter-day Saint baptisms, stating:

The Church of Jesus Christ of Latter-day Saints, by self-definition, does not fit within the bounds of the historic, apostolic tradition of Christian faith. This conclusion is supported by the fact that the LDS Church itself, while calling itself Christian, explicitly professes a distinction and separateness from the ecumenical community and is intentional about clarifying significant differences in doctrine. As United Methodists we agree with their assessment that the LDS Church is not a part of the historic, apostolic tradition of the Christian faith.

The Episcopal Church (USA), part of the 80-million-member Anglican Communion, does not have an official position on the validity of Mormon baptism; however, most traditional clergy would not accept Mormon baptism and require the baptism of Latter-day Saints entering into the Episcopal Church. Retired bishop Carolyn Tanner Irish of the Episcopal Diocese of Utah was baptized into the LDS Church at the age of 8; her baptism was deemed valid upon her entering into the Episcopal Church in 1977, where she was confirmed by bishop of Washington, Rev. John T. Walker. As with the United Methodist Church, the Episcopal Church does not recognize Latter-day Saints as historic Apostolic Christians, but rather as a new and unique religious movement that is an offshoot of Christianity.

=== Proselytizing of Latter-day Saints by evangelical Christians ===
Many other Christian churches also seek to teach or convert Latter-day Saints when the opportunity arises. Some evangelical Christian leaders often encourage their followers to follow the admonition of Paul and witness to others using gentleness and respect. Like their Mormon counterparts, those from the evangelical Christian religions assert that these proselytizing efforts arise out of love and genuine concern for others and not a desire to cause contention. Consequently, though the feelings may be strong, there is often a feeling of mutual appreciation and respect that accompanies missionary efforts on both sides (though this is not always the case). Some evangelical Christian denominations have ministries focused on Latter-day Saints, just as they also have ministries toward Jews, Native Americans, or other demographic groups. For example, the 1998 convention of the Southern Baptist Convention held in Salt Lake City had the stated aim to "bring Christianity to the Latter-day Saints".

There are also many independent evangelical ministries and organizations focused on Latter-day Saints.

=== Polls and attitudes ===
A 2016 Pew Poll showed that only 51% of the general public in the United States believed that Latter-day Saints were Christians while another 32% said they were not, which was in stark contrast with the 97% of Latter-day Saints who considered themselves Christians. Additionally, when asked to describe in one word to best represent Mormonism, Latter-day Saints typically replied "Christian", "Christ-Centered" or "Jesus", while most non-Latter-day Saints replied with "Cult".

Similar polls have concluded that over two-thirds of the general public view Latter-day Saints as members of the larger Christian community, including many independent evangelical ministries and prominent evangelical leaders. However, in an October 2010 poll conducted by LifeWay Research, three out of four American Protestant pastors did not believe that Latter-day Saints were Christians.

== Mormon engagement with broader Christianity ==
In the 1960s, the LDS Church formed the Church Information Service with the goal of being ready to respond to media inquiries and generate positive media coverage. The organization kept a photo file to provide photos to the media for such events as temple dedications. It also would work to get stories covering Family Home Evening, the church's welfare plan and the church's youth activities in various publications.

As part of the church's efforts to re-position its image, the church began to moderate its earlier anti-Catholic rhetoric. In Bruce R. McConkie's 1958 edition of Mormon Doctrine, he had stated his opinion that the Catholic Church was part of "the church of the devil" and "the great and abominable church" because it was among organizations that misled people away from following God's laws. In his 1966 edition of the same book, the specific reference to the Catholic Church was removed.

In 1973, the LDS Church recast its missionary lessons, making them more family-friendly and focused on building on common Christian ideals. The new lessons, named "A Uniform System for Teaching Families", de-emphasized the Great Apostasy, which previously held a prominent position just after the story of the First Vision. After a further revision in the early 1980s, the lessons dealt with the apostasy even less conspicuously by moving its discussion from the first lesson to later lessons. The lessons also became more family-friendly, including a flip chart with pictures, in part to encourage the participation of children.

In 1995, the church announced a new logo design that emphasized the words "JESUS CHRIST" in large capital letters. According to Bruce L. Olsen, director of public affairs for the church, "The logo re-emphasizes the official name of the church and the central position of the Savior in its theology. It stresses our allegiance to the Lord, Jesus Christ."

In 2001, the church sent out a press release encouraging reporters to use the full name of the church at the beginning of news articles, with following references to the "Church of Jesus Christ". The release discouraged the use of the term "Mormon Church".

=== Downplaying of differences ===
Riess and Tickle assert that, starting in the late twentieth century, Latter-day Saints have focused their attention on Jesus Christ more than at any other time since the inception of their faith. Some critics of the LDS Church have accused church leaders of attempting to disingenuously portray the church as "just another Christian denomination" when, in fact, there are significant differences. Riess and Tickle argue that these critics are failing to grasp that this recent emphasis on Jesus Christ is part of a genuine theological evolution that concurrently involves a renewed interest in the Book of Mormon.

Ross Anderson asserts that, "(i)n public, LDS spokesmen downplay their Church's distinctive doctrines."

Patricia Limerick suggests that future historians may conclude that, in the last four decades of the 20th, the general authorities of the LDS Church "undertook to standardize Mormon thought and practice". According to Limerick, this campaign of standardization has led to a retreat from the distinctive elements of Mormonism and an accentuation of the church's similarity to conventional Christianity.

According to Claudia Bushman, "[t]he renewed emphasis on scripture study, especially the Book of Mormon, led the Church away from speculative theology. The freewheeling General Conference addresses of earlier years, elaborating unique LDS doctrines, were gradually replaced with a basic Christian message downplaying denominational differences."

Recent church presidents have tended to downplay those doctrines that served to distinguish Mormonism from mainline churches. Richard Abanes asserts that President Gordon B. Hinckley "on numerous occasions demonstrated his willingness to seriously downplay any issues that might be construed as controversial".

In 2001, Hinckley stated that message of the LDS Church was "Christ-centered. [Christ is] our leader. He's our head. His name is the name of our church."

When speaking about other faiths, modern LDS leaders have adopted a policy of avoiding the use of critical and judgmental language in official church publications, and encouraged members of the church to be respectful of the beliefs of others as they witness in their personal lives. When speaking about other faiths, church magazines are often complimentary and focus on providing factual information rather than on sensationalizing or otherwise seeking to undermine the creeds and practices of others.

Several presidents of the LDS Church over the years have emphasized the need for Latter-day Saints to recognize the good contributions those of other faiths make to the world.

=== Cooperation with other Christian denominations ===
Ron Rhodes asserts that, "The Mormon church has in recent years sought to downplay its exclusivism as the 'restored' church. Indeed, the Mormon church has increasingly become involved with the Interfaith movement, joining with various Christian denominations in various charities."

Traditional Christian denominations and the LDS Church share work in providing welfare or humanitarian aid. In recent years, the LDS Church has opened its broadcasting facilities (Bonneville International) to other Christian groups, and has participated in the VISN Religious Interfaith Cable Television Network.

=== Dialogue with other Christian denominations ===
There have been independent activities among individuals from both traditions who attempt to discuss openly about issues of faith. In November 2004, Fuller Theological Seminary President Richard Mouw and Ravi Zacharias, a well known evangelical Christian philosophical apologist, addressed a congregation of Latter-day Saints and evangelicals gathered in the Salt Lake Tabernacle for an event sponsored by Standing Together Ministries that was well received despite the differences they acknowledged between Mormonism and evangelical perspectives.

In the 1950s, President David O. McKay met with Bishop Duane G. Hunt, of the Diocese of Salt Lake City, several times in secret, at Holy Cross Hospital in Salt Lake City, to avoid fears of scandalizing members of their respective churches. Their meetings consisted of discussions about community issues and tensions between the two groups in Utah.

In 2019, while in Rome to dedicate the Rome Italy Temple, President Russell M. Nelson met with Pope Francis. Nelson is the first Latter-day Saint prophet to meet with a Catholic pope. Nelson said that he and Francis spoke about the "importance of religious liberty, the importance of the family, our mutual concern for the youth of the church, for the secularization of the world, and the need for people to come to God, and worship him, pray to him and have the stability that faith in Jesus Christ will bring in their lives."

=== Proselytization of other Christian denominations ===
Latter-day Saints proselytize to all people, including members of other Christian churches, holding to the belief that God told Joseph Smith "that those professors [of religion] were all corrupt; that: 'they draw near to me with their lips, but their hearts are far from me, they teach for doctrines the commandments of men, having a form of godliness, but they deny the power thereof.'" Because ministering to those of other Christian faiths can be a sensitive task when feelings on both sides are strong, leaders of the LDS Church have counseled members to be sensitive, to exercise caution, and to avoid contentions in their preaching. Despite the criticisms of other creeds, a tone of respect has consistently been encouraged by Mormon leaders. For example, Wilford Woodruff, an early president of the church and a contemporary of Joseph Smith taught:

When you go into a neighborhood to preach the Gospel, never attempt to tear down a man's house, so to speak, before you build him a better one; never, in fact, attack any one's religion, wherever you go. Be willing to let every man enjoy his own religion. It is his right to do that. If he does not accept your testimony with regard to the Gospel of Christ, that is his affair, and not yours. Do not spend your time in pulling down other sects and parties. We haven't time to do that. It is never right to do that.

While the LDS Church has been clear about its disagreements with many of the theologies and practices of other religions and seeks actively to convert all people to its own teachings, it has also always adopted a policy of toleration for others and defended the rights of all people to worship God freely. Article 11 of the church's Articles of Faith written by Joseph Smith states, "We claim the privilege of worshiping Almighty God according to the dictates of our own conscience, and allow all men the same privilege, let them worship how, where, or what they may." Smith spoke often of the need for Latter-day Saints to be civil and courteous in their treatment of others, particularly those who were not of their faith, and to be willing to defend the right of anyone to religious freedom. He said:

If we would secure and cultivate the love of others, we must love others, even our enemies as well as friends ... I possess the principle of love. All I can offer the world is a good heart and a good hand. The Saints can testify whether I am willing to lay down my life for my brethren. If it has been demonstrated that I have been willing to die for a "Mormon", I am bold to declare before Heaven that I am just as ready to die in defending the rights of a Presbyterian, a Baptist, or a good man of any other denomination. ... It is a love of liberty which inspires my soul.

Because Mormon missionaries proselytize to all, including other Christians, some Christian organizations have published tracts, brochures and books designed to counter these missionary efforts.

Conciliar Press, a department of the Antiochian Orthodox Christian Archdiocese of North America, has published a brochure designed to inform Orthodox Christians of the proselytizing efforts of what it describes as "cultists" (Latter-day Saints and Jehovah's Witnesses).

In 2006, the Catholic bishops in Slovakia urged all Catholics in the country not to sign a petition allowing the LDS Church to be legally recognized in that country.

== See also ==
- Christian countercult movement
- Criticism of the Church of Jesus Christ of Latter-day Saints
- Judaism and Mormonism
- Mormon apologetics
- Mormonism and Freemasonry
- Mormonism and Islam
- Moroni (Book of Mormon prophet)
- Catholic-Protestant relations
