= Columbia South Carolina Temple =

Temple of the LDS Church

- Interactive map of Columbia South Carolina Temple
- Number: 62
- Dedication: October 16, 1999, by Gordon B. Hinckley
- Site: 3.6 acres (1.5 ha)
- Floor area: 10,700 ft^{2} (990 m^{2})
- Height: 71 ft (22 m)
- Official website • News & images

Church chronology
← Bismarck North Dakota Temple	Columbia South Carolina Temple	→ Detroit Michigan Temple

Additional information
- Announced: September 11, 1998, by Gordon B. Hinckley
- Groundbreaking: December 5, 1998, by Gordon T. Watts
- Open house: September 30 – October 9, 1999
- Current president: Timothy B. Guffey
- Designed by: Mike Watson
- Location: Hopkins, South Carolina, United States
- Coordinates: 33°57′34.69679″N 80°53′38.33159″W
- Exterior finish: Imperial Danby White variegated marble quarried from Vermont
- Design: Classic modern, single-spire design
- Baptistries: 1
- Ordinance rooms: 2 (two-stage progressive)
- Sealing rooms: 2

The Columbia South Carolina Temple is the 62nd operating temple of the Church of Jesus Christ of Latter-day Saints and the first constructed in South Carolina. Located in Hopkins, a suburb southeast of Columbia, the temple serves approximately 40,000 members across South Carolina and parts of Georgia, North Carolina, and Tennessee. After being announced on September 11, 1998, by the church's First Presidency, its groundbreaking occurred on December 5, 1998, with Gordon T. Watts of the Seventy presiding. After construction was completed, nearly 20,000 people toured the temple during a public open house held from September 30 to October 9, 1999. Church president Gordon B. Hinckley dedicated the temple on October 16, 1999, in six sessions.

The temple's exterior has Imperial Danby white marble quarried from Vermont, and its grounds are landscaped with native flora, including loblolly pine, oak, crape myrtle, holly, mums, and dogwood trees. The 10,700-square-foot building includes two instruction rooms, two sealing rooms, and a baptistry. It also has a single spire with a gold-plated angel statue of the angel Moroni on its top.

In 2020, like all the church's others, the temple was closed temporarily in response to the COVID-19 pandemic.

== History ==
The Columbia South Carolina Temple was announced by the First Presidency on September 11, 1998. The temple is on a 3.6-acre (1.5 ha) property located at 2905 Trotter Road in Hopkins, a suburb of Columbia, South Carolina. A single-story structure of approximately 10,700 square feet was planned.

The groundbreaking ceremony took place on December 5, 1998, marking the commencement of construction. This ceremony was presided over by Gordon T. Watts of the Seventy and attended by more than 3,500 local church members and community leaders.

Following completion of construction, a public open house was held from September 30 to October 9, 1999. During the open house, approximately 20,000 people visited the temple.

The Columbia South Carolina Temple was dedicated on October 16-17, 1999, by Gordon B. Hinckley. The dedication was conducted in six sessions over two days, with four sessions on Saturday and two on Sunday.

== Design and architecture ==
The Columbia South Carolina Temple uses a classic modern, single-spire design. The temple’s exterior uses Imperial Danby white variegated marble, quarried from Vermont. It has a traditional single spire topped by a gold-plated angel Moroni statue, a common symbol on Latter-day Saint temples representing the restoration of the gospel.

The temple is on a 3.6-acre plot southeast of Columbia, South Carolina. The landscaping includes a blend of native and ornamental plantings such as crape myrtle, large holly, dogwood, and mums.

It is 10,700 square feet and includes two ordinance rooms, two sealing rooms, and a baptistry.

Renovations between September 4, 2023 and March 5, 2024 included remodeling the waiting room to create a separate break room for temple workers, reconfiguring the temple presidency offices, updating the baptistry laundry room, and enhancing the temple worker locker rooms. Mechanical upgrades were also implemented, including the installation of new heating and air conditioning systems. Laundry facilities were enlarged, and a new hallway was constructed to provide access to ordinance worker spaces with dressing rooms and a break room.

== Cultural and community impact ==
Deputy Chief of Staff Michael LeFever attended the open house on behalf of Governor James Hodges, who was occupied with Hurricane Floyd recovery efforts. Hodges sent a personal letter commending church members for their efforts in establishing the temple.

Rabbi Philip Silverstein was one of the guests from the VIP tours, who said “You are the only Church that cares about the spirit of Elijah”. Along with a tour from the head of the Radio Gold station from Ghana.

== Temple presidents ==
The church's temples are directed by a temple president and matron, each typically serving for a term of three years. The president and matron oversee the administration of temple operations and provide guidance and training for both temple patrons and staff.

Serving from 1999 to 2002, David V. Yarn was the first president, with Catherine J. Yarn as matron. As of 2023, J. Vaun McArthur is the president, with Jackie McArthur serving as matron.

== Admittance ==
On September 30, 1999, the church announced the public open house that was held from September 30 to October 9, 1999 (excluding Sundays). The temple was dedicated by Gordon B. Hinckley October 16-17, 1999, in six sessions.

Like all the church's temples, it is not used for Sunday worship services. To members of the church, temples are regarded as sacred houses of the Lord. Once dedicated, only church members with a current temple recommend can enter for worship.

== Gallery ==
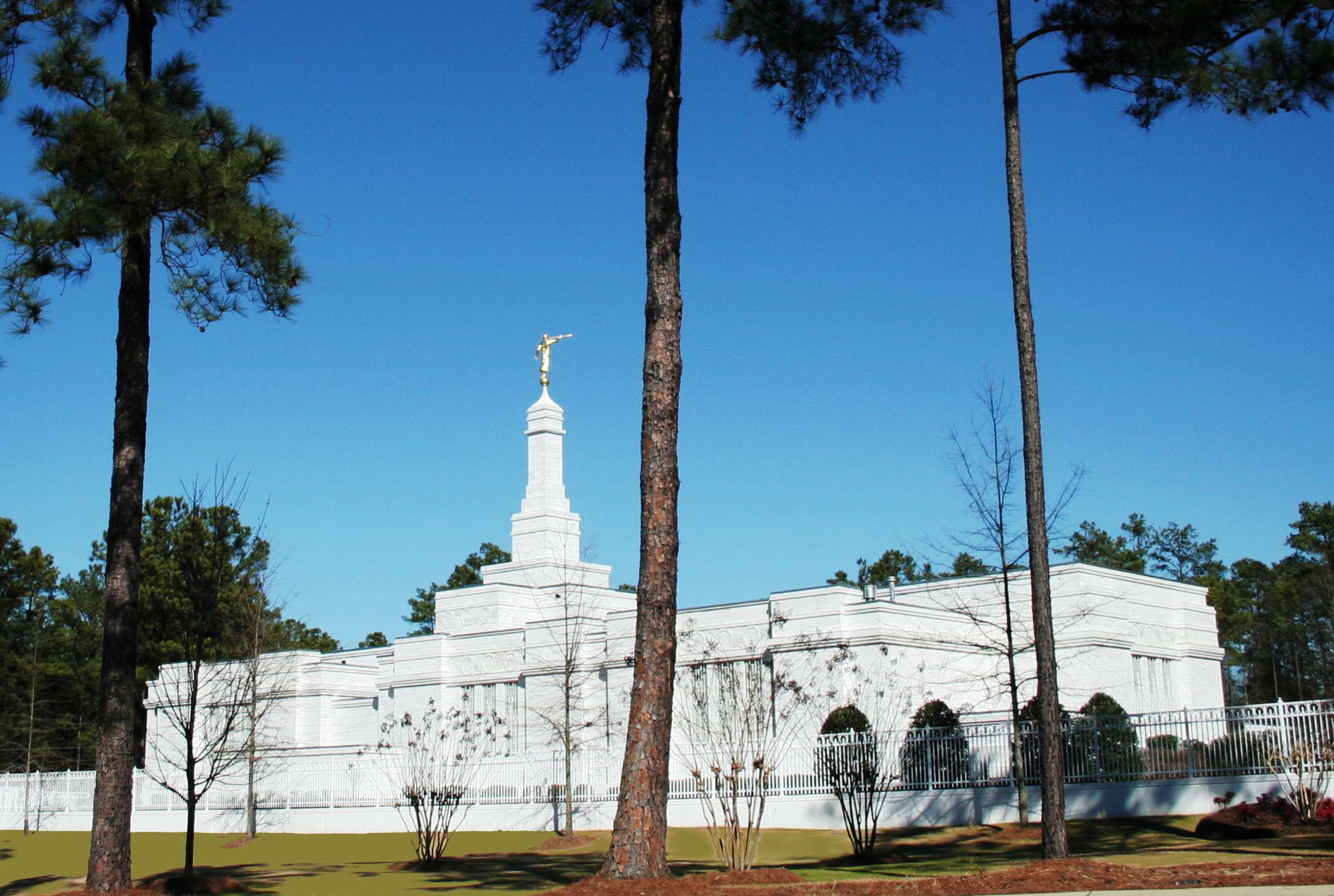
Temple, exterior

Temple, 2018

== See also ==
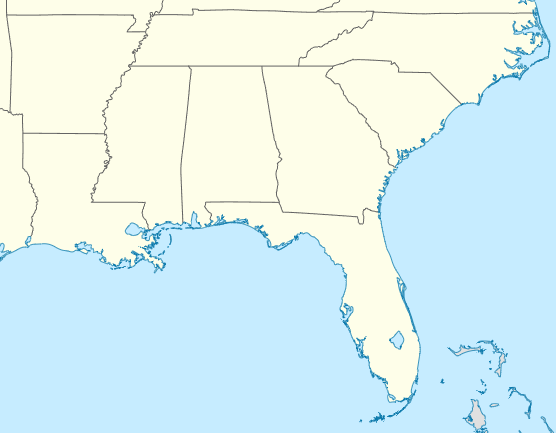
Temples in the Southeastern United States
- = Operating
- = Under construction
- = Announced
- = Temporarily Closed
- Comparison of temples of The Church of Jesus Christ of Latter-day Saints
- List of temples of The Church of Jesus Christ of Latter-day Saints
- List of temples of The Church of Jesus Christ of Latter-day Saints by geographic region
- Temple architecture (Latter-day Saints)
- The Church of Jesus Christ of Latter-day Saints in South Carolina

== Additional reading ==
- Franklin-Moore, Linda (December 12, 1998), "Groundbreaking held in South Carolina", Church News
- Franklin-Moore, Linda (October 2, 1999), "South Carolina temple opens for tours", Church News
- "Columbia South Carolina Temple: 'Many have yearned for this day'", Church News, October 23, 1999
- Lloyd, R. Scott (October 23, 1999), "Cover Story: New temple in a 'place of history'", Church News
