= Milo Andrus =

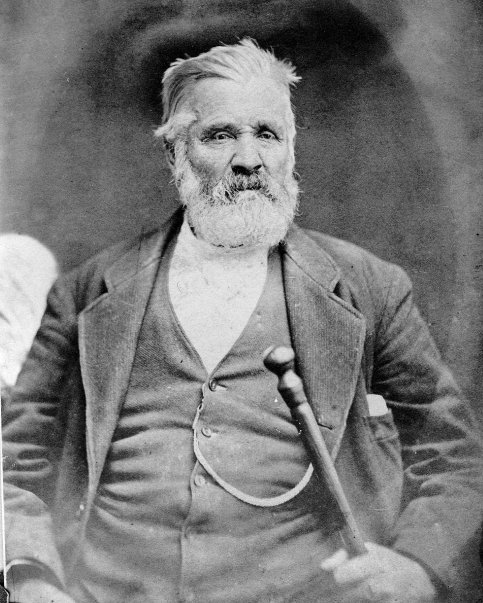
- Milo Andrus; 1890
- Born: March 6, 1814; Wilmington, New York
- Died: June 19, 1893 (aged 79)
- Occupation: Early leader in the Church of Jesus Christ of Latter-day Saints.

Milo Andrus (March 6, 1814 – June 19, 1893) was one of earliest leaders in the Church of Jesus Christ of Latter-day Saints.

== Biography ==
Andrus was born in Wilmington, New York, to Ruluf Andress and Azuba Smith. He joined the Church of Jesus Christ of Latter-day Saints in 1832 in Florence, Ohio. He was one of the members of Zion's Camp. He helped build the Kirtland, Nauvoo, Salt Lake, and Saint George temples. He served as a missionary for the Church of Jesus Christ in England in the early 1840s. He led three wagon trains of pioneers from the Midwest to the Salt Lake Valley (1850, 1855, and 1861). He was a Bishop (Church of Jesus Christ) in Nauvoo, a Stake President in St. Louis, a member of the Quorum of the Seventy, and was serving as a Patriarch at his death.

In 1854, Andrus recommended that a new outfitting site for emigrants going to Utah be situated four miles west of the soon-to-be-town of Atchison, Kansas. Cholera at previous outfitting sites necessitated this new location. It was called Mormon Grove and was near the Missouri River and Atchison. Atchison needed laborers to build, and the emigrants needed work to earn money to outfit themselves for the overland trip to Utah—so this was a good place for an outfitting site. Milo Andrus oversaw the site in 1855. One hundred-sixty acres were obtained and a sod fence was built around it. Thirty to forty acres were planted so that the incoming emigrants would have food. The planted acreage was called the Perpetual Emigration Farm and soon Mormon Grove became a tent city. That year 2,041 people and 337 wagons left for Utah with Andrus leading one of the wagon trains. While in St. Louis, he preached many sermons. Among those who joined the church due to his preaching was Heinrich Eyring, who would later become a long-serving president of the Indian Territory Mission in Oklahoma, and who was the grandfather of the chemist Henry Eyring.

Andrus was a major in the Nauvoo Legion during the Utah War and was a chaplain of the Utah State Legislature. He built many roads in Utah and Southern Idaho.

Like many early Latter-day Saints, Andrus was a polygamist; he had eleven wives and fifty-seven children.
