= The Man with 80 Wives =

- Country of origin: United Kingdom
- Original language: English

Original release
- Network: Channel 4
- Release: 19 July 2006

The Man With 80 Wives is a British documentary that aired on Channel 4 on 19 July 2006. It featured journalist Sanjiv Bhattacharya, trying to find the whereabouts of the Fundamentalist Church of Jesus Christ of Latter-Day Saints leader, Warren Jeffs.
