= Omni (Book of Mormon record keeper) =

Book of Mormon prophet

According to the Book of Mormon, Omni (/ˈɒmnaɪ/) is the first writer of several authors of the Book of Omni, and the son of Jarom. It is believed that he was born in 390 BC. Omni wrote the first three verses of the Book of Omni before passing the responsibility of keeping the Book of Mormon record to his son, Amaron. His writings are shown below:

1. Behold, it came to pass that I, Omni, being commanded by my father, Jarom, that I should write somewhat upon these plates, to preserve our genealogy—
2. Wherefore, in my days, I would that ye should know that I fought much with the sword to preserve my people, the Nephites, from falling into the hands of their enemies, the Lamanites. But behold, I of myself am a wicked man, and I have not kept the statutes and the commandments of the Lord as I ought to have done.
3. And it came to pass that two hundred and seventy and six years had passed away, and we had many seasons of peace; and we had many seasons of serious war and bloodshed. Yea, and in fine, two hundred and eighty and two years had passed away, and I had kept these plates according to the commandments of my fathers; and I conferred them upon my son Amaron. And I make an end.

== Family ==
Jacob
Enos
Jarom
Omni
Amaron	Chemish
Abinadom
Amaleki

Preceded by Jarom	Nephite record keeper of the small plates Sometime before 323 BC – 317 BC	Succeeded by Amaron
