= Zenock =

Book of Mormon prophet

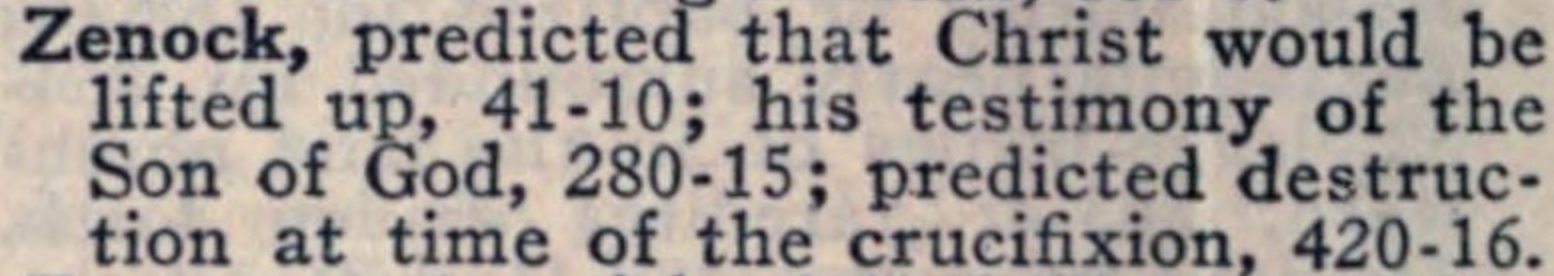
- From the index of the 1920 edition of the Book of Mormon
- First appearance: 1 Nephi 19:10
- Last appearance: 3 Nephi 10:16
- Alias: Zenoch
- Death: Stoning

In the Book of Mormon, Zenock (/ˈziːnək/) is a prophet who predates the events of the book's main plot and whose prophecies and statements are recorded upon brass plates possessed by the Nephites. Nephite prophets quote or paraphrase Zenock several times in the course of the narrative.

In the earliest manuscripts of the Book of Mormon, the intended spelling of Zenock was Zenoch, resembling the biblical Enoch. Oliver Cowdery, who transcribed part of the Book of Mormon, misspelled the name when he copied the text to a printer's manuscript, and that spelling has carried over to almost all published editions of the Book of Mormon.

== Background ==
Joseph Smith, founder of the Latter Day Saint movement, claimed that he translated an ancient (Note: Like Smith, most adherents of the Latter Day Saint movement believe that the Book of Mormon is of ancient origin and describes actual historical people and events.) record on metal plates via miraculous power given by God; Smith dictated to friends who wrote his words down in an intermittent process from 1829 to 1830. The resulting text was published in 1830 as the Book of Mormon, and it is the primary religious text of the Latter Day Saint movement.

In the book's narrative, God tells a man named Lehi, along with his family, to leave Jerusalem to avoid the Babylonian captivity. The family goes to the Americas where they establish a society and live as what Terryl Givens calls "pre-Christian Christians" which eventually splits into two peoples, Nephites and Lamanites. The majority of the book is framed as the retrospective work of its narrators, including Nephi and Mormon, who self-reflexively describe their own creation of the text as a record etched onto metal plates. The plates of the framing narrative are modeled on brass plates that Lehi's family bring with them from Jerusalem. The Book of Mormon describes the brass plates as containing "a record of the Jews", "the law", and scriptures.

== Synopsis ==
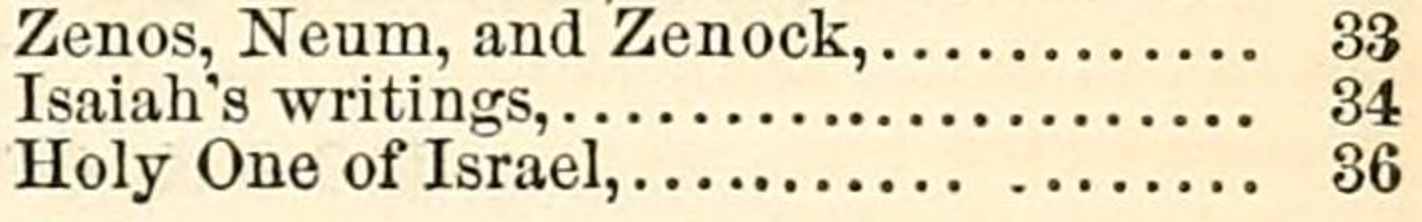
Zenock in the table of contents

Zenock is described as a prophet who lived in the Old World some time after the "days of Abraham". Nephi quotes Zenock, along with Zenos, while enscribing the small plates of Nephi.

The Book of Mormon narrates that Zenock taught that Jesus would be the Son of God, and would die as part of the Christian atonement. Zenock is described as having taught that God was merciful to people because of this. Zenock's prophecies are vaguer than the other Christological prophecies set during the Book of Mormon's main plot, such as those made by Lehi and Nephi. Because of Zenock's teachings, the people he taught persecuted him, banished him, and stoned him to death.

== Textual history ==
The name Zenock does not appear in the Bible. In almost all published editions of the Book of Mormon, the name of this figure is spelled Zenock. However, the earliest spelling of Zenock's name in Book of Mormon manuscripts was Zenoch rather than Zenock. When Joseph Smith dictated the original manuscript of the Book of Mormon for Alma 33:15, Oliver Cowdery (who was scribing for Smith at the time) wrote down Zenock. However, he immediately crossed out Zenock and replaced it with Zenoch, likely prompted by Smith. Spelled Zenoch, the name resembles the biblical name Enoch. However, when Cowdery copied the text into the printer's manuscript, he replaced Zenoch with Zenock. The name was spelled Zenock in the 1830 first edition of the Book of Mormon, and the spelling persisted across subsequent editions, including the current edition published by the Church of Jesus Christ of Latter-day Saints (LDS Church). Religious studies scholar Grant Hardy speculates that additional content about Zenock could have existed in "the lost 116 pages", a portion of the original manuscript of the Book of Mormon which Smith and his cohorts lost and never reproduced.

== Interpretation ==
The Book of Mormon narrator Nephi quotes Zenock along with other nonbiblical and biblical prophets as part of a transition of topic and tone in the record he describes himself keeping. The first portion of Nephi's narration pertains to the history and experiences of his family (1 Nephi 1–18). Nephi introduces Zenock and others in 1 Nephi 19–2 Nephi 5 while writing more about spiritual topics. These citations produce what Frederick W. Axelgard calls an "intense prophetic aspect" of the writing, and after citing Zenock and others, Nephi narrates having a spiritual experience. Nephi citing biblical and nonbiblical prophets provides a bridge between the event- and narrative- focused beginning of his record and the more spiritual and prophetic latter part.

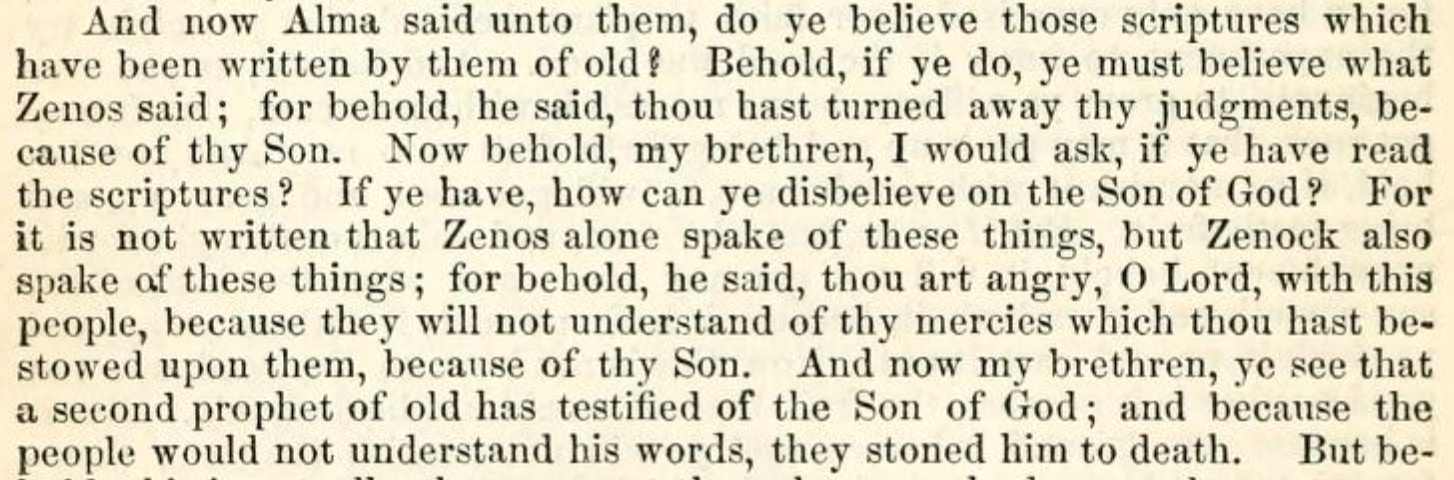
Alma citing Zenock in the 1858 edition of the Book of Mormon published by Jas. O. Wright & Co. Corresponds to Alma 33:12–18 in the LDS edition.

A Book of Mormon prophet named Alma cites Zenock during his ministry in the city of Zoram. While teaching a group of economically poor Zoramites, Alma brings up Zenock and how he was misunderstood and made an outcast. The account of Zenock being an oppressed prophet suggests sympathy with the poor Zoramites amid the injustices they face. By quoting Zenock, Alma sets up his companion Amulek's central message calling for the Zoramites to maintain faith in Christ despite their limited circumstances. Citing Zenock also serves a rhetorical purpose against the wealthy Zoramites opposed to Alma. Alma quotes Zenock saying, "Thou art angry, O Lord, with this people, because they will not understand thy mercies which thou hast bestowed upon them because of thy Son". Zenock's reference to people who refused to understand his own messianic prophecies serves as Alma's indirect reference to his audience's rejection of Jesus as described in Alma's message.

While narrating a divine cataclysm that affects the Nephites, Mormon refers to Zenock and affirms that the events confirmed Zenock's prophecies. As narrator, Mormon presents Zenock's prophecy and its fulfilment within the narrative as proof that religious faith is reasonable.

== Reception ==
Most adherents of the Latter Day Saint movement believe that the Book of Mormon is an ancient text and describes actual historical people and events. Orson Pratt, a member of the Quorum of the Twelve Apostles and contemporary of Smith, expressed his belief that more prophecies from Zenock were contained in additional ancient plates hidden in the hill Cumorah to someday be recovered and revealed by what he believed would be the will of God. Some Latter-day Saint apologists, such as Hugh Nibley, have argued an ancient setting for the Book of Mormon is plausible by speculating ancient identities of figures described in the Book of Mormon. Nibley associated Zenock with the Teacher of Righteousness mentioned in the Dead Sea Scrolls. A roundtable discussion about the Dead Sea Scrolls, held by BYU professors, noted that this notion circulated among Latter-day Saints, but called it a "false rumor" and stated that the scrolls do not mention Zenock.

Christopher Marc Nemelka said that in the late-1980s and early-to-mid-1990s, the deceased Joseph Smith appeared to him and gave him the gold plates of the Book of Mormon from which he said he translated what he called the Book of Lehi. In Nemelka's text, Lehi and Zenock are contemporaries. When Zenock confronts the religious establishment with an accusation of corruption, Lehi believes Zenock's message and rescues him from danger, after which Lehi becomes a target of the Book of Mormon figure Laban. Embaye Melekin, an Eritrean baptized into the LDS Church in 2006, considers Zenock evidence that the Book of Mormon was anciently set not in the Americas but in the Horn of Africa. In Eritrea, which is in the Horn of Africa, it is common to preface names with a z, and Melekin believed that Zenock was the name Enoch prefaced with a z. However, neither of these views has found acceptance among the denominations of the Latter Day Saint movement.

== Bibliography ==
- Alexander, Thomas G.; Bitton, Davis (2019). Historical Dictionary of the Latter-day Saints (4th ed.). Rowman & Littlefield. ISBN 9781538120712.
- Axelgard, Frederick W. (Fall 1986). "1 And 2 Nephi: An Inspiring Whole". BYU Studies. 26 (4): 53–65. JSTOR 43042245.
- Benson, RoseAnn; McConkie, Joseph Fielding (2011). "'A Prophet... Like unto Thee'". Religious Educator. 12 (3): 109–127.
- Benson, Sherrie Mills (2005). "The Zoramite Separation: A Sociological Perspective". Journal of Book of Mormon Studies. 14: 75–85, 129–130.
- Brady, Shon; Hopkin (2013). "The Zoramites and Costly Apparel: Symbolism and Irony". Journal of Book of Mormon Studies. 22 (1): 40–53. JSTOR 10.5406/jbookmormotheres.22.1.0040. S2CID 43872094.
- Bushman, Richard Lyman (2005). Joseph Smith: Rough Stone Rolling. Alfred A. Knopf. ISBN 978-1-4000-4270-8.
- Bushman, Richard Lyman (2020). "Nephi's Project: The Gold Plates as Book History". In Mackay, Michael Hubbard; Ashurst-McGee, Mark; Hauglid, Brian M. (eds.). Producing Ancient Scripture: Joseph Smith's Translation Projects in the Development of Mormon Christianity. University of Utah Press. ISBN 9781607817390.
- Clark, John L. (2002). "Painting Out the Messiah: The Theologies of Dissidents". Journal of Book of Mormon Studies. 11 (1): 16–27. ISSN 1065-9366. JSTOR 10.5406/jbookmormstud.11.1.0016. S2CID 164715330.
- Coe, Michael (January 1973). "Mormons and Archaeology: An Outside View". Dialogue: A Journal of Mormon Thought. 8 (2): 40–48. doi:10.2307/45224400. JSTOR 45224400.
- Davis, William L. (2020). Visions in a Seer Stone: Joseph Smith and the Making of the Book of Mormon. University of North Carolina Press. ISBN 9781469655673.
- Duffy, John-Charles (October 2008). "Mapping Book of Mormon Historicity Debates Part I: A Guide for the Overwhelmed". Sunstone. pp. 36–62.
- Dunstan, Adam; Hawvermale, Erica (2022). "The Anthropology of Mormonism: An Emerging Field" (PDF). Journal of the Mormon Social Science Association. 1: 177–207. doi:10.54587/JMSSA.0107.
- Givens, Terryl (2002). By the Hand of Mormon: The American Scripture that Launched a New World Religion. Oxford University Press. ISBN 978-0-19-516888-4.
- Hardy, Grant (2009). "Introduction". In Skousen, Royal (ed.). The Book of Mormon: The Earliest Text. Yale University Press. pp. vii–xxviii. ISBN 978-0-300-14218-1.
- Hardy, Grant (2010). Understanding the Book of Mormon: A Reader's Guide. Oxford University Press. ISBN 9780199745449.
- Hardy, Heather (Fall 2011). "Alma's Experiment in Faith: A Broader Context". Dialogue: A Journal of Mormon Thought. 44 (3): 67–91. doi:10.5406/dialjmormthou.44.3.0067. S2CID 171511633.
- Holzapfel, Richard Neitzel; Parry, Donald W.; Pike, Dana M.; Seely, David Rolph (2008). "The Dead Sea Scrolls: A Roundtable Discussion Celebrating the Sixtieth Anniversary of Their Discovery, Part 2". Religious Educator. 9 (2): 83–97.
- Jackson, Kent P. (1992). "Zenock". Encyclopedia of Mormonism. Macmillan. p. 1623.
- Maffly-Kipp, Laurie (2008). "Introduction". The Book of Mormon. Penguin Classics. Penguin. pp. vi–xxxii. ISBN 978-0-14-310553-4.
- Millet, Robert L. (1989). "The Influence of the Brass Plates on the Teachings of Nephi". The Book of Mormon: Second Nephi, the Doctrinal Structure. Religious Studies Center. pp. 207–225. ISBN 0-8849-4699-1.
- Nibley, Hugh (1986). Welch, John W.; Gillum, Gary P.; Norton, Don E. (eds.). Old Testament and Related Studies. Collected Works of Hugh Nibley. Deseret Book and FARMS. ISBN 0875790321. LCCN 85027544. OCLC 12908841.
- Packer, Cameron J. (2004). "Cumorah's Cave". Journal of Book of Mormon Studies. 13 (1–2): 55. JSTOR 10.5406/jbookmormstud.13.1-2.0050. S2CID 193606120.
- Shields, Steven L. (2009). "Revelation in the Latter Day Saint Movement: Prophets, Seers, and Revelators in the Modern Era". The John Whitmer Historical Association Journal. 29: 140–156. ISSN 0739-7852. JSTOR 43200348.
- Shields, Steven L. (Spring–Summer 2019). "Embaye Melekin and the Book of Mormon as an African Bible". John Whitmer Historical Association Journal. 39 (1): 133–143. JSTOR 26741620.
- Shipps, Jan (1985). Mormonism: The Story of a New Religious Tradition. University of Illinois Press. ISBN 0-252-01159-7.
- Skousen, Royal, ed. (2009). The Book of Mormon: The Earliest Text. Yale University Press. ISBN 978-0-300-14218-1.
- Skousen, Royal (2012). "Some Textual Changes for a Scholarly Study of the Book of Mormon". BYU Studies Quarterly. 51 (4): 99–117. JSTOR 43042376.
- Skousen, Royal (2014). Analysis of Textual Variants of the Book of Mormon. Part One, 1 Nephi 1–2 Nephi 10. The Critical Text of the Book of Mormon. Vol. 4. FARMS and Brigham Young University. p. 409.
- Vogel, Dan (1986). Indian Origins and the Book of Mormon. Signature Books.
