= The Church of Jesus Christ of Latter-day Saints in South Carolina =

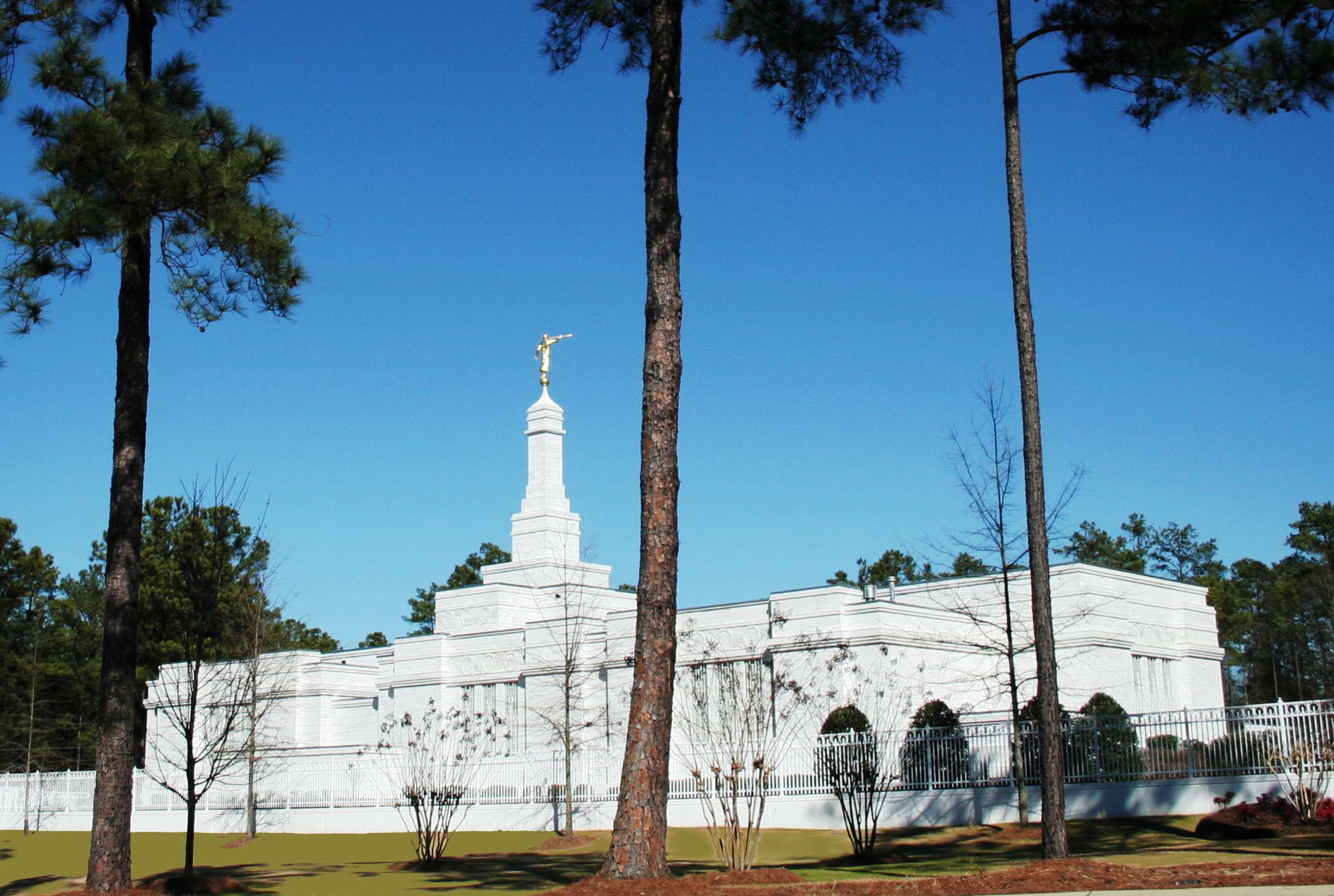
- The Columbia South Carolina Temple
- Area: US Southeast
- Members: 46,753 (2025)
- Stakes: 11
- Wards: 71
- Branches: 18
- Total Congregations: 89
- Missions: 2
- Temples: 1 operating 1 announced 2 total
- FamilySearch Centers: 23

The Church of Jesus Christ of Latter-day Saints in South Carolina refers to the Church of Jesus Christ of Latter-day Saints (LDS Church) and its members in South Carolina. The first small branch was established in 1882. It has since grown to more than 46,000 members in 89 congregations.

Official church membership as a percentage of general population was 0.83% in 2014. According to the 2014 Pew Forum on Religion & Public Life survey, less than 1% of South Carolinans self-identify themselves most closely with the Church of Jesus Christ of Latter-day Saints. The LDS Church is the 11th largest denomination in South Carolina.

== History ==
The first LDS member in South Carolina is believed to be Emmanual Masters Murphy, who was baptized in Tennessee in 1836. When Elder Lysander M. Davis arrived in South Carolina in 1839 (nine years after the Church was organized in New York), he found the Murphys had people prepared for baptism. Seven of them were baptized.

Opposition arose and Davis was briefly jailed. Murphy had reportedly spoken with Church President Joseph Smith in the late 1830s, and was told to warn South Carolinians of the destruction soon to hit their state, "the wars that will shortly come to pass, beginning at the rebellion of South Carolina, which will eventually terminate in the death and misery of many souls ... the Southern states will call on other nations, even the nation of Great Britain..." This warning saw reality in 1861, when the Confederates attacked Fort Sumter, and the Civil War commenced.

=== Catawba tribe ===
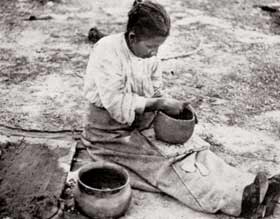
A Catawba potter

The South Carolina Conference was organized on March 31, 1882, with its first president as Elder Willard C. Burton of the Southern States Mission. The Kings Mountain Baptist Church had several families converted on March 12, 1882. Some of the earliest branches were established at King's Mountains beginning March 3, 1882, and among the Catawba Indian community beginning July 31, 1885. Conference headquarters were established at the plantation of John Shaw Black, a man who remained unbaptized to provide refuge for the Church, and a veteran of the Palmetto Sharpshooters. Many converts, including Indians, moved onto his plantation to escape persecution. The Catawbas also shielded missionaries from persecutions. Two families were noted in Missionary journals as being home base, James and Elizabeth W Patterson's home protected them on the occasions of the mobs hunting them. Evan and Lucy Marsh Watts were the host family when Elder C E Robinson died, and they were again helping when the two Elders were injured, Elder W C Cragun and F A Franughton. Most of the Catawbas joined the Church and remained faithful in South Carolina.

One of the more known LDS members of the Catawba tribe was Samuel Taylor Blue (Chief Blue). Blue was baptized in 1897. A few years later he served as branch president of the branch of the LDS Church on the Catawba Reservation. In the early 20th century he would often help missionaries escape mobs. In 1950 Blue traveled to Salt Lake City and gave a talk at General Conference on April 9.

Another Catawba, the first Lamanite Patriarch, William F. Canty, came from five families who moved west with the Migration in 1887. His father John Alonzo Canty was the first Branch President of the Gaffney area, and James Patterson, his grandfather, was the first Branch President of the Catawba Branch. William (Buck) Canty spoke at the BYU Indian school graduation many times in the 1970s and toured with the Lamanite Generation in 1978.

=== Church growth ===
Membership in South Carolina
Year	Members
1900	1,200
1930	3,343
1974	10,755
1980	17,012
1990	23,731
1999	27,399
2009	35,968
2019	41,358
2025	46,753
Source: Windall J. Ashton; Jim M. Wall, Deseret News, various years, Church Almanac State Information: South Carolina

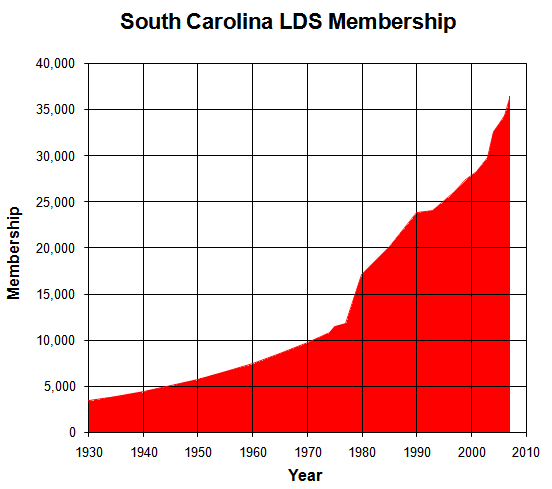
South Carolina LDS membership history

Progress and persecution continued in the 1890s. Mobs often gathered to persecute missionaries. In 1897, mobs burned one of South Carolina's first Latter-day Saint meetinghouses in an area called by locals Centerville near the small town of Ridgeway South Carolina. It was rebuilt and burned again in 1899.

Branches organized included Society Hill, Columbia, Charleston, and Fairfield. However, as converts migrated to the West, branches dwindled, and some were reorganized later with new converts. The South Carolina conference included six branches (four with meetinghouses) and 10 Sunday Schools.

On November 20–21, 2004, President Hinckley spoke to nearly 12,000 Church members in Columbia, S.C., with proceedings carried to 11 meetinghouses in 11 other stakes in South Carolina and Georgia.

=== Humanitarian efforts ===
The LDS Church in South Carolina has been involved in a number of humanitarian services. These include disaster relief, aid to the needy and sick, and other services. Some of the more significant relief efforts given by the church or its members in South Carolina are mentioned in this section.

The Church has provided relief to many natural disasters, including Hurricane Hugo, Hurricane Andrew, flooding from Tropical Storm Alberto in Georgia, Hurricane Opal, and Florida's Hurricane Jeanne.

Following Hurricane Katrina in 2005, several thousand Latter-day Saint volunteers from South Carolina and other areas, went to Louisiana and Mississippi. Many of them took time out of their jobs or came down on the weekends to help.

In 1996, the LDS Church authorized $100,000 and service to help rebuild 28 of the predominantly black churches across the South (including in South Carolina) that had burned in the previous 18 months. These funds were divided according to need.

In 1996, the LDS Church donated 41,000 pounds of food to the Crisis Ministries Center in the Charleston area.

== Stakes ==
South Carolina's first stake was created in Columbia on October 19, 1947. It included the entire state, with wards in Columbia, Greenville, Charleston, Gaffney, Hartsville, Ridgeway, and Spartanburg. Its branches included Augusta (Georgia), Sumter, Society Hill, Winnsboro, and Darlington.

The South Carolina West Stake (later known as Greenville South Carolina East Stake), was organized in 1963. In 1968, the South Carolina East Stake was organized, and later became known as the Florence South Carolina Stake (now Myrtle Beach South Carolina Stake). The Charleston Stake was organized in 1972. As of July 2026, the following stakes were located in South Carolina:

Stake	Organized	Mission
Aiken South Carolina Stake	February 17, 2019	South Carolina Columbia
Charleston South Carolina	August 20, 1972	South Carolina Charleston
Columbia South Carolina	October 19, 1947	South Carolina Columbia
Fort Mill South Carolina	August 26, 2018	North Carolina Charlotte
Greenville South Carolina	November 19, 1972	South Carolina Columbia
Hartsville South Carolina Stake	October 22, 2023	South Carolina Columbia
Hilton Head South Carolina Stake	February 24, 2019	South Carolina Charleston
Myrtle Beach South Carolina	February 5, 1978	South Carolina Charleston
Simpsonville South Carolina	November 16, 2003	South Carolina Columbia
Spartanburg South Carolina	August 24, 2025	South Carolina Columbia
West Columbia South Carolina	February 3, 2002	South Carolina Columbia

- Charleston South Carolina Stake - Originally named Charleston Stake when organized in 1972.
- Columbia South Carolina Stake - Originally named South Carolina Stake (S.C., Georgia)
- Florence South Carolina Stake - Originally named South Carolina East (South Carolina) when it was organized on April 21, 1968. The name was then changed to the Columbia South Carolina East Stake. It was finally reorganized and named the Florence South Carolina on February 5, 1978.
- Fort Mill South Carolina - Stake was created from congregations in the Charlotte North Carolina South and Gastonia North Carolina Stakes. Was created by Elder Vern P. Stanfill, General Authority Seventy, and Elder Matthew S. Harding, an Area Seventy in August 2018. First stake President being Blake D. Smith. Stake formed on August 26, 2018.
- Greenville South Carolina - Originally named Greenville Stake when it was organized in 1972.
- Greenville South Carolina East - Originally named South Carolina West (S.C, N.C.) when it was organized on January 37, 1963. It was then reorganized and named the Greenville South Carolina East Stake on November 16, 2003.

== Missions ==
South Carolina was originally part of the Southern States Mission when it was opened in 1876. In June 1971, the Southern States Mission was divided and renamed the Georgia-South Carolina Mission. On June 20, 1974, it was renamed the Georgia Atlanta Mission in accordance to the new church naming policy for missions. On July 1, 1975, the South Carolina Columbia Mission was organized.

In June 2024 the South Carolina Charleston Mission was created from a division of existing missions.

== Temples ==
Temples in South Carolina
- = Operating
- = Under construction
- = Announced
- = Temporarily Closed

On 16 October 1999 the Columbia South Carolina Temple was dedicated by President Gordon B. Hinckley. On 6 April 2025, Church President Russell M. Nelson announced the Greenville South Carolina Temple

62. Columbia South Carolina Temple; Official website; News & images	
Location: Announced: Groundbreaking: Dedicated: Size: Style:	Hopkins, South Carolina, United States; September 11, 1998 by Gordon B. Hinckley; December 5, 1998 by Gordon T. Watts; October 16, 1999 by Gordon B. Hinckley; 10,700 sq ft (990 m^{2}) on a 3.6-acre (1.5 ha) site Classic modern, single-spire design - designed by Mike Watson
378. Greenville South Carolina Temple (Site announced); Official website; News & images	
Location: Announced: Size:	Greenville, South Carolina; 6 April 2025 by Russell M. Nelson; 18,850 sq ft (1,751 m^{2}) on a 8.8-acre (3.6 ha) site

== See also ==
- The Church of Jesus Christ of Latter-day Saints membership statistics (United States)
- List of prophecies of Joseph Smith: Prophecies from 1831 to 1832 - prophecy of the Civil War
