= The Church of Jesus Christ of Latter-day Saints in Malaysia =

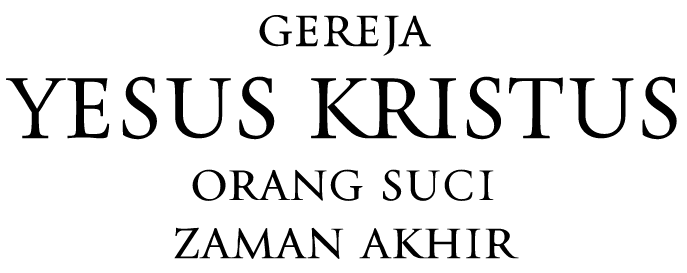
- (logo in Malay)

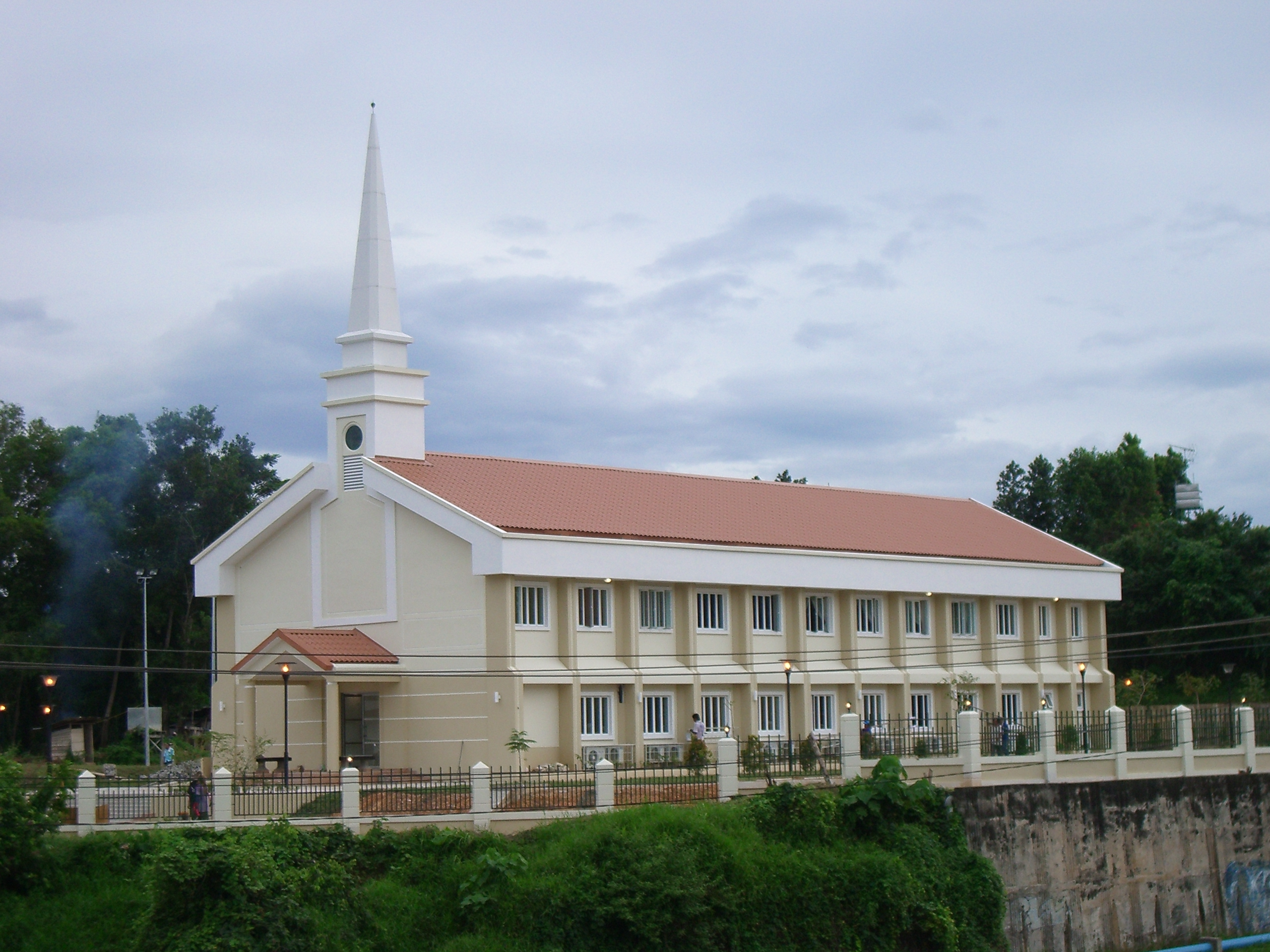
- A meetinghouse in Kota Kinabalu, Sabah.
- Area: Asia
- Members: 11,769 (2025)
- Districts: 5
- Branches: 24
- FamilySearch Centers: 10

The Church of Jesus Christ of Latter-day Saints in Malaysia (Malay: Gereja Yesus Kristus Orang Suci Zaman Akhir) refers to the Church of Jesus Christ of Latter-day Saints (LDS Church) and its members in Malaysia. In 2019 membership was nine times what it was in 1999 and number of congregations more than doubled during the same time period.

== History ==
Membership in Malaysia
Year	Membership
1977	66
1979	60
1989*	300
1999	1,141
2009	6,404
2019	10,845
2025	11,655
*Membership was published as an estimated or rounded number.

The LDS Church has had a presence in Malaysia for less than 40 years.

When the Singapore Mission of the church was established in 1974, Malaysia was within the boundaries of the mission. Mormon missionaries were rotated in and out of the country on 30-day tourist visas to comply with Malaysian law.

After the government granted the LDS Church recognition status in 1977, Elder and Sister Werner Kiepe were sent as senior missionaries to Malaysia. They helped acquire the first property owned by the church in Malaysia in the suburb of Kuala Lumpur. Church membership was small with many members being Americans, Australians temporarily working in the country; there were also some Chinese members living in the country.

A milestone was reached when two native Malaysian men were called in 1981 to serve as missionaries in the Singapore Mission. In the same year, a district was organised in Malaysia. In 1986, the seminary and institute program was established in the country. In 1990, King Syed Putra Jamallulail, the Raja of Perlis, was honoured during a visit at the church's Polynesian Cultural Center in Laie, Hawaii.

In 1995, Joseph B. Wirthlin of the Quorum of the Twelve Apostles visited Malaysia and dedicated the country for "the preaching the gospel". Convert baptisms have doubled in 1998 over those in 1997.

Ground was broken for the first meetinghouse in East Malaysia at Kota Kinabalu on 16 April 2003. Though it was the first groundbreaking of a meetinghouse in Malaysia, it was the second meetinghouse dedicated in the country.

On 2 August 2003, the Malaysia district holds its women's conference. Latter-day Saint Charities, the humanitarian arm of the Church, assisted 15 Malaysian communities with providing a reliable supply of clean drinking water.

== Districts ==
District Centers in Malaysia
Orange = District
Purple = meetinghouse not part of stake or district

As of May 2025, the Church of Jesus Christ of Latter-day Saints has 5 districts in Malaysia:

District	Organized
Kota Kinabalu Malaysia District	4 May 1997
Kuala Lumpur Malaysia District	2 Apr 1980
Kuching Malaysia District	11 Mar 2003
Miri Malaysia District	15 Jun 2008
Sibu Malaysia District	29 Nov 2009

All congregations in a district is considered a branch regardless of size and participation. The Singapore Dispersed Members Unit serves individuals and families not in proximity to a church meetinghouse.

== Missions ==
Malaysia is within the boundaries of the church's Singapore Mission. In July 2022, the headquarters of the Singapore mission were rotated to Kuala Lumpur.

== Temples ==
Malaysia was part of the Hong Kong China Temple district until the completion of the Bangkok Thailand Temple in 2023. A temple in Singapore was announced to be constructed on April 4, 2021. Temple ground was broken on June 28th, 2025 in Singapore.

== See also ==
- Christianity in Malaysia
