= Stephen E. Robinson =

American Mormon religious scholar

Stephen Edward Robinson (May 23, 1947 – June 17, 2018) was a religious scholar and apologist, who was a member of the Church of Jesus Christ of Latter-day Saints (LDS Church).

== Biography ==
Stephen E. Robinson was born and raised in Southern California (La Crescenta/La Canada) and served a two-year mission for the LDS Church in the Northern States Mission (Illinois, Iowa, and Wisconsin). In 1972, he married Janet Bowen (B.A., B.S., CPA), and they have six children. He was a member of the faculty at Brigham Young University (BYU) since 1986, and he was appointed chairman of the Department of Ancient Scripture there in 1990. Robinson received a B.A. in English and Philosophy from the BYU Honors Program in 1971, graduating with "High Honors with Distinction." He received a Ph.D. in Biblical Studies and Classics from Duke University in 1978, and was tenured at Lycoming College in 1984, after teaching religion there, at Hampden–Sydney College, at UNC-Chapel Hill, and Duke. Robinson also served as chairman of the Scholars Program, of the Religion Department, and of the Faculty Senate at Lycoming. He was published in scholarly venues such as the Society of Biblical Literature, Revue de Qumran, the Coptic Encyclopedia, Journal for the Study of Judaism, and the Anchor Bible Dictionary. Robinson also has several popular books, Are Mormons Christians?, Believing Christ (the "Best Book" Award-winner at ILDS Booksellers for 1995), Following Christ (the "Best Book" at ILDSB for 1996), and How Wide the Divide? (a "Best Book" Award-winner at Christianity Today in 1997). He received numerous awards for his research, teaching, and writing. Robinson retired in 2012 and received emeritus status at BYU.

Besides his professional work in Biblical Studies, Robinson is also widely known for his ecumenical dialogue with non-Mormon scholars. He was the first practicing Latter-day Saint to be tenured in Religion at a non-Mormon institution (Lycoming College). Robinson and Craig Blomberg, an Evangelical New Testament scholar at the Denver Seminary, co-authored an important book on LDS/Evangelical relations entitled How Wide the Divide? (1997), which in turn led to an ongoing series of friendly and objective exchanges between LDS and traditional Christian scholars.

Robinson died June 17, 2018.

== Controversy ==
In LDS circles, Robinson is generally considered to be orthodox and to have a reliable grasp of LDS doctrine. He came to the center of a conflict between the Foundation for Ancient Research and Mormon Studies (FARMS) and Salt Lake City publisher Signature Books, through his critical review of the writing of Dan Vogel, by describing it as being patterned after the teachings of Korihor, an atheist orator in the Book of Mormon (Alma 30). According to Daniel C. Peterson, then editor of the FARMS Review, FARMS tried to quiet down the counter-attack by Signature Books by emphasizing that Robinson's review was directed at the methodology of the writings and not the beliefs or character of the authors reviewed.

== Bibliography ==
Books

- Robinson, Stephen E. (1982) [1978], The Testament of Adam: an Examination of the Syriac and Greek Traditions, Dissertation series, Society of Biblical Literature (SBL), no. 52, Chico, CA: Scholars Press, ISBN 0891303987, OCLC 6087515
- —— (1991), Are Mormons Christians?, Salt Lake City: Bookcraft, ISBN 088494784X, OCLC 23823658
- —— (1992), Believing Christ: The Parable of the Bicycle and Other Good News, Salt Lake City, Utah: Deseret Book, ISBN 0875796346, OCLC 26053779
- —— (1995), Following Christ: The Parable of the Divers and More Good News, Salt Lake City: Deseret Book, ISBN 1573450596, OCLC 32746801
- Blomberg, Craig; Robinson, Stephen E. (1997), How Wide the Divide?: A Mormon & an Evangelical in Conversation, Downers Grove, IL: InterVarsity Press, ISBN 0830819916, OCLC 36059991
- Robinson, Stephen E.; Garrett, H. Dean (2000–2005), A Commentary on the Doctrine and Covenants, (4 volumes), Salt Lake City: Deseret Book, ISBN 1573457841, OCLC 44391467
- —— (2004), You are Priceless: the parable of the bicycle, Salt Lake City: Shadow Mountain, ISBN 1590383613, OCLC 54988628

Other writings

- Robinson, Stephen E. (1991), "The Word of God: Essays on Mormon Scripture (by Dan Vogel, A review of)", FARMS Review, 3 (1), Provo, Utah: Maxwell Institute: 312–318, doi:10.2307/44792683, JSTOR 44792683, S2CID 54906601
- —— (April 1992), "Believing Christ", Ensign, LDS Church: 5
- —— (1992), "Doctrine: LDS Doctrine Compared With Other Christian Doctrines", in Ludlow, Daniel H (ed.), Encyclopedia of Mormonism, New York: Macmillan Publishing, ISBN 0-02-879602-0, OCLC 24502140
- —— (1998), "Nephi's "Great and Abominable Church"", Journal of Book of Mormon Studies, 7 (1), Provo, Utah: Maxwell Institute: 32–39, 70, doi:10.2307/44759917, JSTOR 44759917, S2CID 191701954
- —— (2003), "Early Christianity and 1 Nephi 13-14", A Book of Mormon treasury: Gospel insights from general authorities and religious educators, Salt Lake City: Religious Studies Center, Brigham Young University; Deseret Book, pp. 112–127
