= Hong Kong China Temple =

LDS Church temple in Hong Kong China, China

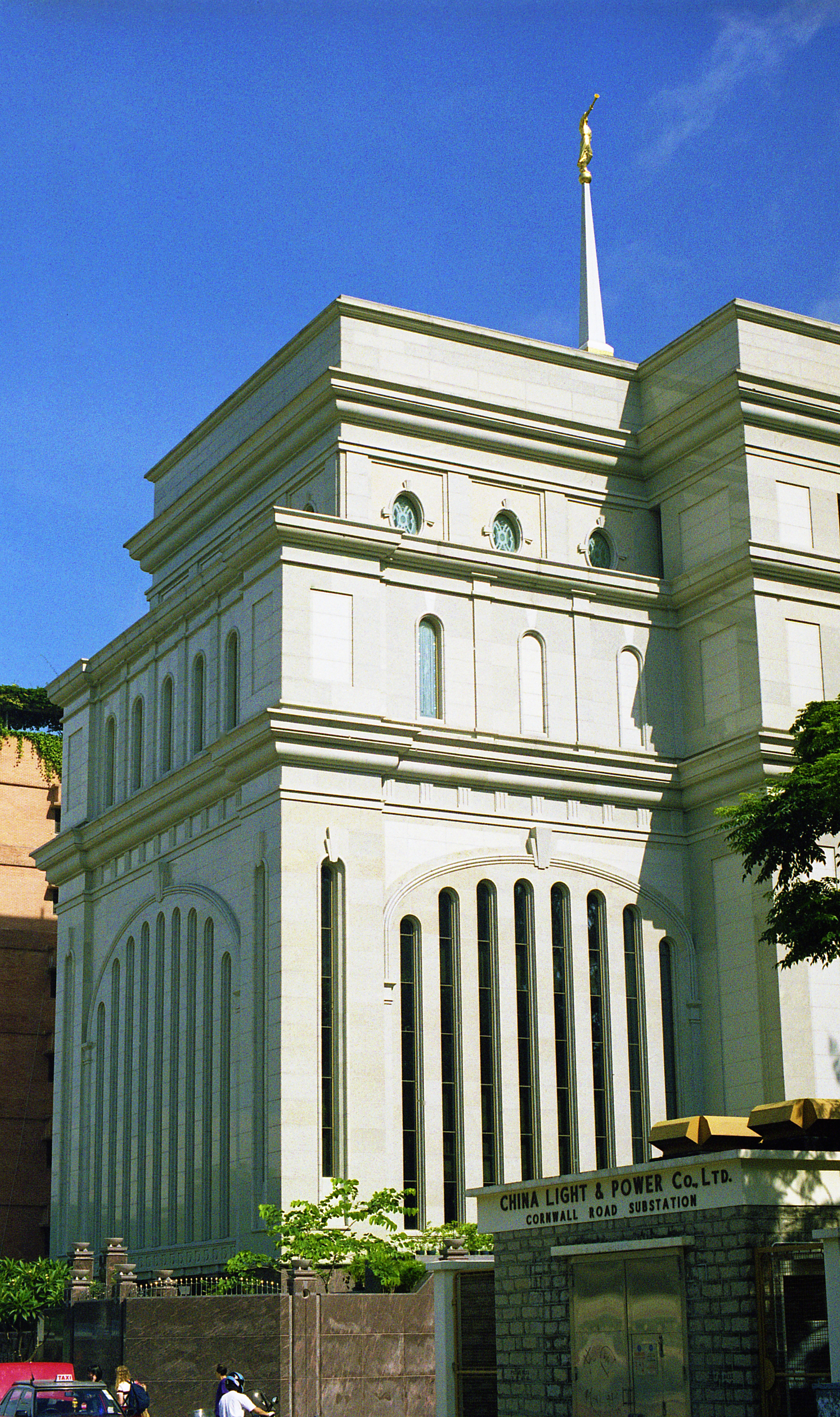
- Interactive map of Hong Kong China Temple
- Number: 48
- Dedication: 26 May 1996, by Gordon B. Hinckley
- Site: 0.31 acres (0.13 ha)
- Floor area: 51,921 ft^{2} (4,823.6 m^{2})
- Height: 135 ft (41 m)
- Official website • News & images

Church chronology
← Bountiful Utah Temple	Hong Kong China Temple	→ Mount Timpanogos Utah Temple

Additional information
- Announced: 3 October 1992, by Ezra Taft Benson
- Groundbreaking: 22 January 1994, by John K. Carmack
- Open house: 7–21 May 1996; 23–29 May 2022
- Rededicated: 19 June 2022, by Gerrit W. Gong
- Current president: Chi Yin Lo
- Designed by: Liang Peddle Thorpe Architects
- Location: Kowloon Tong, Hong Kong, China
- Coordinates: 22°20′25″N 114°10′38″E
- Exterior finish: Polished granite
- Design: Hong Kong colonial, single-spire design
- Baptistries: 1
- Ordinance rooms: 2 (stationary)
- Sealing rooms: 2
- Clothing rental: Yes

The Hong Kong China Temple (Chinese: 中國香港聖殿), formerly the Hong Kong Temple (Chinese: 香港聖殿), is the 48th operating temple of the Church of Jesus Christ of Latter-day Saints (LDS Church). The intent to build the temple was announced on October 3, 1992, by Gordon B. Hinckley, first counselor in the First Presidency, during general conference. Located in the Kowloon Tong neighborhood, the temple serves church members from parts of India, Pakistan, Thailand, Sri Lanka, Singapore, Mongolia, Hong Kong, Malaysia, Cambodia, and Indonesia.

== History ==
=== Background ===
The groundwork for the Hong Kong China Temple was laid decades before its construction. In 1853, the LDS Church sent its first missionaries to Hong Kong—Hosea Stout, James Lewis, and Chapman Duncan. However, internal turmoil in China made their efforts challenging, causing them to return home after only a few weeks. In 1921, David O. McKay, of the Quorum of the Twelve Apostles, dedicated China for missionary work during a prayer in Beijing's Forbidden City. Missionary work in Hong Kong officially began on July 14, 1949, with a prayer by apostle Matthew Cowley, who was joined by Henry Aki and mission president Hilton A. Robertson. By 1951, about 30 people attended weekly meetings, growing to 1,700 members by 1960 and 10,000 by 1975. Efforts included a translation of the Book of Mormon, completed in Chinese in 1965.

=== Planning and construction ===
In 1992, Gordon B. Hinckley announced plans to build a temple in the territory. Finding a site on which to build, however, proved difficult, especially given the high cost of real estate in the area. Finally, it was decided that the temple would be built on the site of the existing mission home and chapel, becoming a multipurpose facility, with the temple on its upper floors. Groundbreaking occurred on January 22, 1994, presided over by John K. Carmack of the Seventy.

Because of the land shortage in the territory, the temple had to be 'built up' instead of 'spreading out' to build. This scarcity of space contributed to the unique design of the Hong Kong Temple. The six-story building is designed to house not only the temple, but also a chapel, mission offices, and living quarters for the temple president and several missionaries.

=== Temple dedication ===
Construction proceeded over the next four years. After completion, a public open house was held from May 7 to May 21, 1996, welcoming over 13,000 visitors, including 25 interfaith leaders and 500 VIP guests. On May 26–27, 1996, the temple was dedicated in seven sessions by Hinckley, who was then the church president. He was joined by his first counselor, Thomas S. Monson, with Neal A. Maxwell and Joseph B. Wirthlin of the Quorum of the Twelve Apostles, as well as the presidency of the church's Asia Area: Kwok Yuen Tai, John H. Groberg, and Rulon G. Craven. Over 5,000 members participated, with many traveling from Taiwan, Thailand, Singapore, and mainland China. Returned missionaries and former mission presidents were also among the attendees.

Hinckley and Monson alternated conducting the sessions and offering the dedicatory prayer. Hinckley noted the church's remarkable growth in the region, from owning little property in Asia to reaching "full maturity" with the temple's dedication. At the time, Hong Kong was home to 20,000 church members in five stakes.

=== Renovation ===
On January 29, 2019, the LDS Church announced the temple would close on July 8, 2019, for renovations. Updates included structural reinforcement, changes to the exterior design, and significant interior reconfigurations. The spire and angel Moroni statue were permanently removed, replaced by a smaller tower reflecting an understated yet culturally harmonious aesthetic. Following renovation, the temple was rededicated by Gerrit W. Gong, the church's first ethnically Chinese apostle, on June 19, 2022.

== Design and architecture ==
The Hong Kong China Temple is on a 0.3-acre site, with a total area of 21,744 square feet (2,020.1 m^{2}). It is located at the heart of the Asia continent, in the Kowloon Tong neighborhood of Hong Kong.

The temple's exterior is polished granite, inspired by Hong Kong's colonial architecture, featuring Giallo Ornamental and Sunset Gold stone sourced from Xiamen, China. Its vertical columns of art glass and ornamental walls reflect traditional Chinese elements. A water feature and meticulously curated gardens enhance the serene atmosphere of the grounds.

The temple's interior includes a baptistry, celestial room, two instruction rooms, and two sealing rooms. The design has traditional Chinese motifs, including the thunder pattern symbolizing life-giving rain. Decorative stencils inspired by ancient Chinese ceramics adorn various rooms, while Yulan magnolia art glass symbolizes purity and is featured prominently in the celestial room. The temple's multipurpose design also includes a chapel, classrooms, offices, and other facilities spread across its various floors.

Custom-designed furniture incorporates fretwork and asymmetrical wood grain patterns reminiscent of Chinese craftsmanship. Lighting fixtures echo the shape of traditional Chinese lanterns, with hexagonal chandeliers and crystal prisms evoking classic designs.

The design and decor emphasize themes of peace and eternity, symbolizing harmony between cultural heritage and spiritual purpose. Gordon B. Hinckley described the temple as a "sanctuary of peace amid the rush and roar" of Hong Kong's bustling metropolis.

== Cultural and community impact ==
The Hong Kong China Temple serves as a spiritual hub for church members in Asia, particularly for Filipino domestic workers who often work six days a week. To accommodate them, the temple uniquely opens quarterly on Sundays. The temple open house generated interfaith dialogue and unity, hosting over 500 VIP guests from various religious traditions. At its original dedication, over 5,000 members attended, with participants traveling from Taiwan, Singapore, Thailand, and mainland China.

== Temple presidents ==
The church's temples are directed by a temple president and matron, each serving for a term of three years. The president and matron oversee the administration of temple operations and provide guidance and training for both temple patrons and staff. As of 2024, Simon-Yue-Sang Chan is the president, with Isabel Kit-Fong Chow Chan serving as matron.

== Temple admittance ==
Like all the church's temples, it is not used for Sunday worship services. To members of the church, temples are regarded as sacred houses of the Lord. Once dedicated, only church members with a current temple recommend can enter for worship. Non-members were able to tour the temple during its open house events.

== See also ==
- Comparison of temples of The Church of Jesus Christ of Latter-day Saints
- List of temples of The Church of Jesus Christ of Latter-day Saints
- List of temples of The Church of Jesus Christ of Latter-day Saints by geographic region
- Temple architecture (Latter-day Saints)
- The Church of Jesus Christ of Latter-day Saints in Hong Kong
