= Standard works =

Scriptural canon of the LDS Church

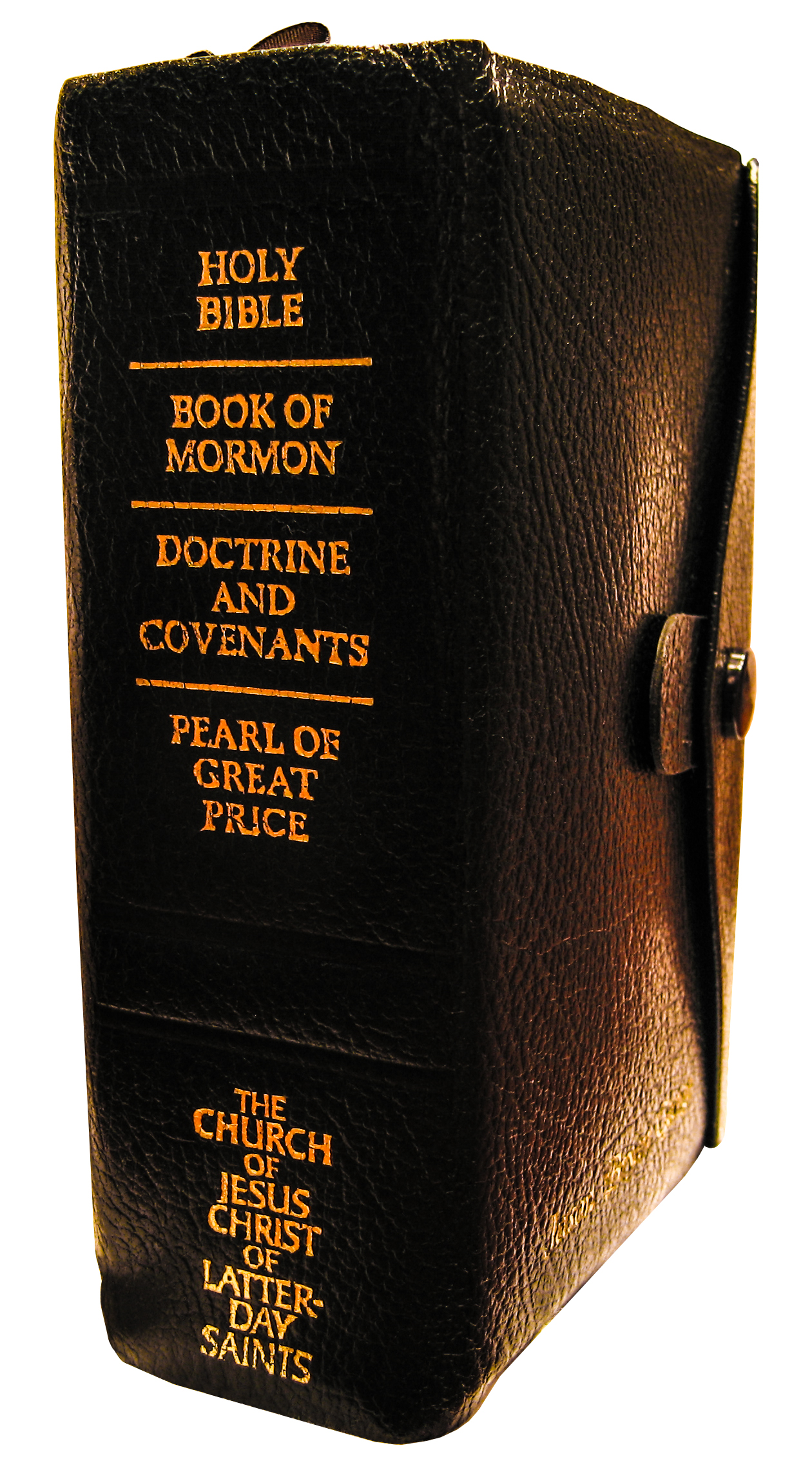
Quadruple combination format of the Standard Works: the Bible, Book of Mormon, Doctrine and Covenants, and Pearl of Great Price. The LDS Church regards approved versions of these works in any language to be just as authentic as the originals.

The Standard Works of the Church of Jesus Christ of Latter-day Saints (LDS Church, the largest in the Latter Day Saint movement) are the four books that currently constitute its open scriptural canon. The four books of the standard works are:

- The Authorized King James Version (KJV) as the official scriptural text of the Bible (other versions of the Bible are used in non-English-speaking countries)
- The Book of Mormon, subtitled since 1981 "Another Testament of Jesus Christ"
- The Doctrine and Covenants (D&C)
- The Pearl of Great Price (containing the Book of Moses, the Book of Abraham, Joseph Smith–Matthew, Joseph Smith–History, and the Articles of Faith)

The Standard Works are printed and distributed by the LDS Church both in a single binding called a quadruple combination and as a set of two books, with the Bible in one binding, and the other three books in a second binding called a triple combination. Current editions of the Standard Works include a number of non-canonical study aids, including a Bible dictionary, photographs, maps and gazetteer, topical guide, index, footnotes, cross references, and excerpts from the Joseph Smith Translation of the Bible.

The scriptural canon is "open" due to the Latter-day Saint belief in continuous revelation. Additions can be made to the scriptural canon with the "common consent" of the church's membership. Other branches of the Latter Day Saint movement reject some of the Standard Works or add other scriptures, such as the Book of the Law of the Lord and The Word of the Lord Brought to Mankind by an Angel.

== Differences in canonicity across sects ==
Canons of various Latter Day Saint denominations reject some of the Standard Works canonized by the LDS Church or have included additional works. For instance, the Bickertonite sect does not consider the Pearl of Great Price or D&C to be scriptural. Rather, they believe that the New Testament scriptures contain a true description of the church as established by Jesus Christ, and that both the King James Version of the Bible and the Book of Mormon are the inspired word of God. Some Latter Day Saint denominations accept earlier versions of the Standard Works or work to develop corrected translations. Others have purportedly received additional revelations.

The Community of Christ points to Jesus Christ as the living Word of God, and it affirms the Bible, along with the Book of Mormon, as well as its own regularly appended version of D&C as scripture for the church. While it publishes a version of the Joseph Smith Translation of the Bible—which includes material from the Book of Moses—Community of Christ also accepts the use of other English translations of the Bible, such as the standard King James Version and the New Revised Standard Version.

Like the Bickertonites, the Church of Christ (Temple Lot) rejects the D&C and the Pearl of Great Price, as well as the Joseph Smith Translation of the Bible, preferring to use only the King James Bible and the Book of Mormon as doctrinal standards. The Book of Commandments is accepted as being superior to the D&Cs as a compendium of Smith's early revelations but is not accorded the same status as the Bible or the Book of Mormon.

The Word of the Lord and The Word of the Lord Brought to Mankind by an Angel are two related books considered to be scriptural by Fettingite factions that separated from the Temple Lot church. Both books contain revelations said to be given to former Church of Christ (Temple Lot) apostle Otto Fetting by an angelic being who said he was John the Baptist. The latter title (120 messages) contains the entirety of the former's material (30 message) with additional revelations (90 messages) said to be given to William A. Draves by this same being, after Fetting's death. Neither are accepted by the larger Temple Lot body of believers.

The Church of Jesus Christ of Latter Day Saints (Strangite) considers the Bible (when correctly translated), the Book of Mormon, and editions of the D&C published prior to Joseph Smith's death (which contained the Lectures on Faith) to be inspired scripture. They also hold the Joseph Smith Translation of the Bible to be inspired, but do not believe modern publications of the text are accurate. Other portions of the Pearl of Great Price, however, are not considered to be scriptural—though are not necessarily fully rejected either. The Book of Jasher was consistently used by both Joseph Smith and James Strang, but as with other Latter Day Saint denominations and sects, there is no official stance on its authenticity, and it is not considered canonical. This sect likewise holds as scriptural several prophecies, visions, revelations, and translations printed by James Strang, and published in the Revelations of James J. Strang.

An additional work, called The Book of the Law of the Lord, is also accepted as inspired scripture by the Strangites. They likewise hold as scriptural several prophecies, visions, revelations, and translations printed by James Strang, and published in the Revelations of James J. Strang. Among other things, this text contains his purported "Letter of Appointment" from Joseph Smith and his translation of the Voree plates.

The Church of Jesus Christ (Cutlerite) accepts the following as scripture: the Inspired Version of the Bible (including the Book of Moses and Joseph Smith–Matthew), the Book of Mormon, and the 1844 edition of the D&C (including the Lectures on Faith). However, the revelation on tithing (section 107 in the 1844 edition; 119 in modern LDS Church editions) is emphatically rejected by members of this church, as it is not believed to be given by Joseph Smith. The Book of Abraham is rejected as scripture, as are the other portions of the Pearl of Great Price that do not appear in the Inspired Version of the Bible.

Many Latter Day Saint denominations have also either adopted the Articles of Faith or at least view them as a statement of basic theology. (They are considered scriptural by the LDS Church and are included in the Pearl of Great Price.) At times, the Articles of Faith have been adapted to fit the respective belief systems of various faith communities.

== Process of addition or alteration ==
The D&C teaches that "all things must be done in order, and by common consent in the church". This applies to adding new scripture. LDS Church president Harold B. Lee taught "The only one authorized to bring forth any new doctrine is the President of the Church, who, when he does, will declare it as revelation from God, and it will be so accepted by the Council of the Twelve and sustained by the body of the Church." There are several instances of this happening in the LDS Church:

- June 9, 1830: First conference of the church, The Articles and Covenants of the Church of Christ, now known as D&C 20. If the Bible and Book of Mormon were not sustained on April 6 then they were by default when the Articles and Covenants were sustained. (see D&C 20:8-11)
- August 17, 1835: Select revelations from Joseph Smith were unanimously accepted as scripture. These were later printed in the D&C.
- October 10, 1880: The Pearl of Great Price was unanimously accepted as scripture. Also at that time, other revelations in the Doctrine and Covenants – which had not been accepted as scripture in 1835 because they were received after that date – were unanimously accepted as scripture.
- October 6, 1890: Official Declaration 1 was accepted unanimously as scripture. It later began to be published in the Doctrine and Covenants.
- April 3, 1976: Two visions (one received by Joseph Smith and the other by Joseph F. Smith) were accepted as scripture and added to the Pearl of Great Price. (The two visions were later moved to the D&C as sections 137 and 138.)
- September 30, 1978: Official Declaration 2 was accepted unanimously as scripture. It immediately was added to the Doctrine and Covenants.

When a doctrine undergoes this procedure, the LDS Church treats it as the word of God, and it is used as a standard to compare other doctrines. Lee taught:

It is not to be thought that every word spoken by the General Authorities is inspired, or that they are moved upon by the Holy Ghost in everything they speak and write. Now you keep that in mind. I don't care what his position is, if he writes something or speaks something that goes beyond anything that you can find in the standard works, unless that one be the prophet, seer, and revelator—please note that one exception—you may immediately say, "Well, that is his own idea!" And if he says something that contradicts what is found in the standard works (I think that is why we call them "standard"—it is the standard measure of all that men teach), you may know by that same token that it is false; regardless of the position of the man who says it.

== The Bible ==
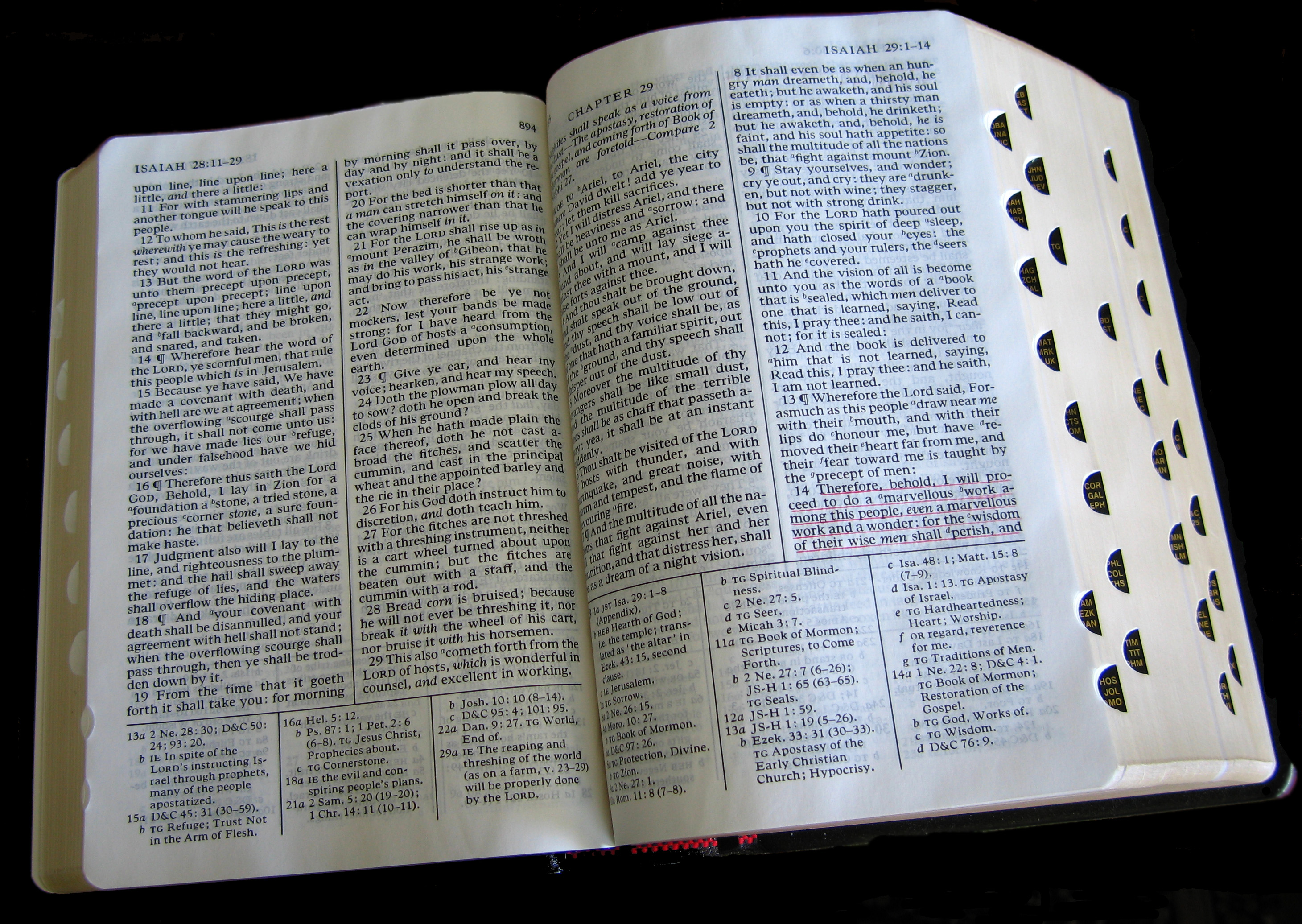
Quadruple combination format of the Standard Works opened to the Book of Isaiah. Note the cross references between Biblical and Latter-day Saint scripture in the footnotes.

English-speaking Latter-day Saints typically study a custom edition of the KJV, which includes custom chapter headings, footnotes referencing books in the Standard Works, and select passages from the Joseph Smith Translation of the Bible.

Though the KJV was always commonly used, it was officially adopted in the 1950s when J. Reuben Clark, of the church's First Presidency, argued extensively that newer translations, such as Revised Standard Version (RSV) of 1952, were of lower quality and less compatible with LDS Church tradition. After publishing its own KJV edition in 1979, the First Presidency announced in 1992 that the KJV was the church's official English Bible, stating: "[w]hile other Bible versions may be easier to read than the King James Version, in doctrinal matters latter-day revelation supports the King James Version in preference to other English translations." In 2010, this statement was written into the church's Handbook, which directs official church policy and programs. In January 2026, this policy was updated to reflect a recognition of the utility of modern translations. "Generally, members use a Church-preferred or Church-published edition of the Bible in Church classes and meetings. This helps maintain clarity in discussions and consistent understanding of doctrine. Other Bible translations may also be used."

A Spanish version, with a similar format and using a slightly revised version of the 1909 Reina-Valera translation, was published in 2009. Latter-day Saints in other non-English speaking areas may use other versions of the Bible.

Though the Bible is part of the LDS Church's canon and members believe it to be the word of God, they believe that errors, omissions, and mistranslations are present in even the earliest known Biblical manuscripts. They state that the errors in the Bible have led to incorrect interpretations of certain passages. Thus, as Joseph Smith explained, the church believes the Bible to be the word of God "as far as it is translated correctly". The LDS Church teaches that "[t]he most reliable way to measure the accuracy of any biblical passage is not by comparing different texts, but by comparison with the Book of Mormon and modern-day revelations".

The manuscripts of the Joseph Smith Translation of the Bible state that "the Songs of Solomon are not inspired scripture," and therefore it is not included in the LDS Church's canon and is rarely studied by its members. However, it is still printed in every version of the KJV published by the church.

=== The Apocrypha ===
Although the Apocrypha was part of the 1611 edition of the KJV, the LDS Church does not currently use the Apocrypha as part of its canon. Joseph Smith taught that while the contemporary edition of the Apocrypha was not to be relied on for doctrine, it was potentially useful when read with a spirit of discernment.

=== Joseph Smith Translation of the Bible ===
Joseph Smith translated selected verses of the Bible, working by subject. His complete work is known as the Joseph Smith Translation of the Bible, or the Inspired Version. Although this selected translation is not generally quoted by church members, the English Bible issued by the church and commonly used by Latter-day Saints contains cross-references to the Joseph Smith Translation (JST), as well as an appendix containing longer excerpts from it. Excerpts that were too long to include in the Bible appendix are included in the Pearl of Great Price as the Book of Moses (for Genesis 1:1-6:13) and Joseph Smith-Matthew (for Matthew 23:39-24:51 and Mark 13).

== The Book of Mormon ==
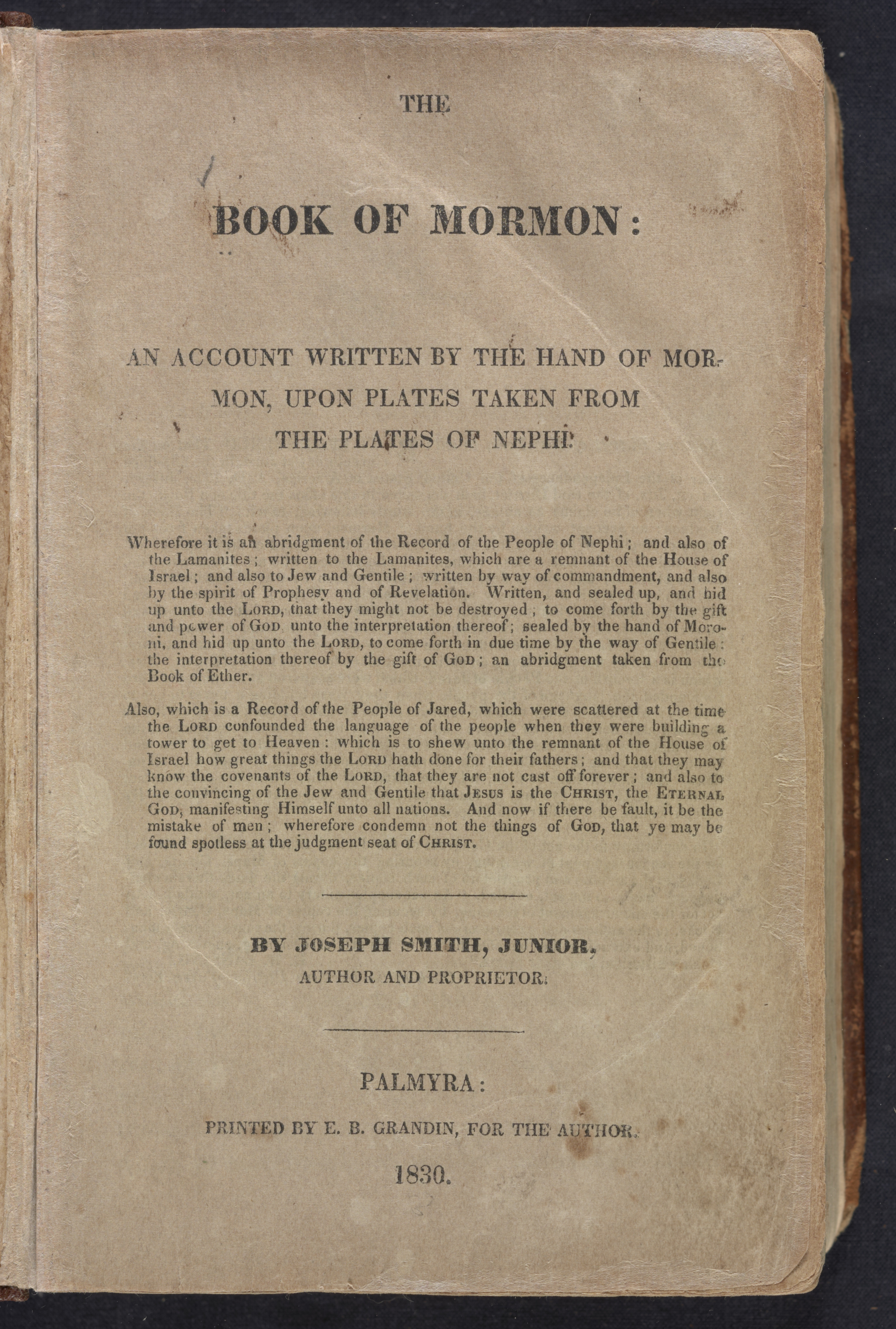
Cover page of the Book of Mormon from an original 1830 edition, by Joseph Smith (Image from the U.S. Library of Congress Rare Book and Special Collections Division)

LDS Church members, and others in the Latter Day Saint movement, consider the Book of Mormon a volume of holy scripture comparable to the Bible. It contains a record of God's dealings with the prophets and ancient inhabitants of the Americas. The introduction to the book asserts that it "contains, as does the Bible, the fullness of the everlasting gospel. The book was written by many ancient prophets by the spirit of prophecy and revelation. Their words, written on gold plates, were quoted and abridged by a prophet-historian named Mormon."

Segments of the Book of Mormon provide an account of the culture, religious teachings, and civilizations of some of the groups who immigrated to the New World. One came from Jerusalem in 600 B.C., and afterward separated into two nations, identified in the book as the Nephites and the Lamanites. Some years after their arrival, the Nephites met with a similar group, the Mulekites who left the Middle East during the same period. An older group arrived in America much earlier, when the Lord confounded the tongues at the Tower of Babel. This group is known as the Jaredites and their story is condensed in the Book of Ether. The crowning event recorded in the Book of Mormon is the personal ministry of Jesus Christ among Nephites soon after his resurrection. This account presents the doctrines of the gospel, outlines the plan of salvation, and offers men peace in this life and eternal salvation in the life to come. The latter segments of the Book of Mormon detail the destruction of these civilizations, as all were destroyed except the Lamanites. The book asserts that the Lamanites are among the ancestors of the Indigenous peoples of the Americas.

According to his record, Joseph Smith translated the Book of Mormon by gift and power of God through a set of interpreters, later referred to as the Urim and Thummim. Eleven witnesses signed testimonies of its authenticity, which are now included in the preface to the Book of Mormon. The Three Witnesses testified to have seen an angel present the golden plates and to have heard God bear witness to its truth. Eight others stated that Joseph Smith showed them the golden plates and that they handled and examined them.

== The Doctrine and Covenants ==
The LDS Church's D&C is a collection of revelations, policies, letters, and statements given to the modern church by past church presidents. This record contains points of church doctrine and direction on church government. The book has existed in numerous forms, with varying content, throughout the history of the church and has also been published in differing formats by the various Latter Day Saint denominations. When the church chooses to canonize new material, it is typically added to the D&C; the most recent changes were made in 1981.

== The Pearl of Great Price ==
The Pearl of Great Price is a selection of material produced by Joseph Smith and deals with many significant aspects of the faith and doctrine of the church. Many of these materials were initially published in church periodicals in the early days of the church.

The Pearl of Great Price contains five sections:

- Selections from the Book of Moses: portions of the Book of Genesis from the Joseph Smith Translation of the Bible.
- The Book of Abraham: a translation from papyri acquired by Smith in 1835, dealing with Abraham's journeys in Egypt. The work contains many distinctive Mormon doctrines such as exaltation.
- Joseph Smith–Matthew: portions of the Gospel of Matthew and Gospel of Mark from the Joseph Smith Translation of the Bible.
- Joseph Smith–History: a first-person narrative of Smith's life before the founding of the church. The material is taken from Documentary History of the Church and is based on a history written by Smith in 1838.
- The Articles of Faith: concise listing of thirteen fundamental doctrines of Mormonism composed by Smith in 1842.

== Table of canonicity ==
All denominations in the Latter Day Saint movement listed below use the same canon of the Book of Mormon. Other uses and content vary among their respective canons.

Books	The Church of Jesus Christ of Latter-day Saints (LDS Church)	Community of Christ (RLDS)	Church of Jesus Christ (Bickertonite)	Church of Christ (Temple Lot)	Church of Christ (Fettingite)	Church of Jesus Christ of Latter Day Saints (Strangite)	Church of Jesus Christ (Cutlerite)
Doctrine and Covenants
Book of Commandments	Yes	Yes	No	No	No	Yes	Yes
Moroni's visit to Joseph Smith	Yes	No	No	No	No	No	Yes
Conferral of Aaronic priesthood by John the Baptist	Yes	No	No	No	No	No	Yes
To Three Witnesses	Yes	Yes	No	No	No	No	Yes
To Parley P. Pratt and Ziba Peterson	Yes	Yes	No	No	No	No	Yes
Property division	Yes	Yes	No	No	No	No	Yes
Location of Zion at Jackson County, Missouri	Yes	Yes	No	No	No	No	Yes
Prayer of Joseph Smith; keys of the kingdom	Yes	Yes	No	No	No	No	Yes
To William E. McLellin	Yes	Yes	No	No	No	No	Yes
Testimony of the Book of Commandments	Yes	Yes	No	No	No	No	Yes
To Orson Hyde, Luke S. Johnson, Lyman E. Johnson, and William E. McLellin; bishops; parents	Yes	Yes	No	No	No	No	Yes
Assignments for John Whitmer	Yes	Yes	No	No	No	No	Yes
Stewardship; equality	Yes	Yes	No	No	No	No	Yes
Joseph Smith and Sidney Rigdon called to preach	Yes	Yes	No	No	No	No	Yes
Bishops	Yes	Yes	No	No	No	No	Yes
Joseph Smith Translation of the Bible	Yes	Yes	No	No	No	No	Yes
Explanation of 1 Corinthians 7:14; salvation of children	Yes	Yes	No	No	No	No	Yes
Missionary work; families of missionaries	Yes	Yes	No	No	No	No	Yes
Jesus Christ; resurrection; degrees of glory; origin of Satan	Yes	Yes	No	No	No	No	Yes
Explanation of certain verses in Revelation	Yes	No	No	No	No	No	Yes
United Order; equality	Yes	Yes	No	No	No	No	Yes
To Jared Carter	Yes	Yes	No	No	No	No	Yes
To Stephen Burnett and Eden Smith	Yes	Yes	No	No	No	No	Yes
To Jesse Gause; on 18 Mar 1833 its application was transferred to Frederick G. Williams	Yes	Yes	No	No	No	No	Yes
Obedience; United Order; equality	Yes	Yes	No	No	No	No	Yes
Husbands and fathers; widows and orphans	Yes	Yes	No	No	No	No	Yes
Priesthood	Yes	Yes	No	No	No	No	Yes
Letter from Joseph Smith to W. W. Phelps; United Order; One Mighty and Strong; equality	Yes	No	No	No	No	No	Yes
Parable of the Tares explained	Yes	Yes	No	No	No	No	Yes
Prophecy of war and calamity	Yes	No	No	No	No	No	Yes
The "olive leaf"; "Lord's message of peace"	Yes	Yes	No	No	No	No	Yes
A "Word of Wisdom"	Yes	Yes	No	No	No	No	Yes
Keys of the kingdom; First Presidency	Yes	Yes	No	No	No	No	Yes
The Apocrypha	Yes	Yes	No	No	No	No	Yes
To Frederick G. Williams	Yes	Yes	No	No	No	No	Yes
John's record of Christ; intelligence; innocence of children	Yes	Yes	No	No	No	No	Yes
To Hyrum Smith, Reynolds Cahoon, and Jared Carter; construction of various buildings commanded	Yes	Yes	No	No	No	No	Yes
Kirtland Temple to be built; purpose of temples	Yes	Yes	No	No	No	No	Yes
Division of property	Yes	Yes	No	No	No	No	Yes
Saints in Jackson County, Missouri; temple to be built in Jackson County	Yes	Yes	No	No	No	No	Yes
Promises and warnings; martyrs; when war is justified; forgiving enemies	Yes	Yes	No	No	No	No	Yes
To John Murdock	Yes	Yes	No	No	No	No	Yes
Joseph Smith and Sidney Rigdon to preach gospel; Rigdon to be Smith's spokesman; welfare of Orson Hyde and John Gould	Yes	Yes	No	No	No	No	Yes
Redemption of Zion; parables; United States and the U.S. Constitution; Saints to seek redress	Yes	Yes	No	No	No	No	Yes
Minutes for first high council meeting	Yes	Yes	No	No	No	No	Yes
Redemption of Zion; organization of Zion's Camp	Yes	Yes	No	No	No	No	Yes
United Order	Yes	Yes	No	No	No	No	Yes
Redemption of Zion; purpose of Kirtland Temple; peace	Yes	Yes	No	No	No	No	Yes
To Warren A. Cowdery; Second Coming	Yes	Yes	No	No	No	No	Yes
Priesthood; quorums	Yes	Yes	No	No	No	No	No
To Lyman Sherman	Yes	No	No	No	No	No	Yes
Dedicatory prayer for Kirtland Temple	Yes	No	No	No	No	No	Yes
Visitation of Jesus Christ to accept Kirtland Temple; conferral of priesthood keys; coming of Moses, Elias, and Elijah	Yes	No	No	No	No	No	Yes
temporal needs of the church	Yes	No	No	No	No	No	Yes
To Thomas B. Marsh; Quorum of the Twelve Apostles; First Presidency	Yes	Yes	No	No	No	No	Yes
Answers to questions on the Book of Isaiah	Yes	No	No	No	No	No	Yes
Concerning David W. Patten	Yes	No	No	No	No	No	Yes
Name of the church; stakes; temple to be built at Far West, Missouri	Yes	No	No	No	No	No	Yes
Adam-ondi-Ahman	Yes	No	No	No	No	No	Yes
Concerning William Marks, Newel K. Whitney, and Oliver Granger; property; sacrifice	Yes	No	No	No	No	No	Yes
Vacancies in the Quorum of the Twelve Apostles filled	Yes	No	No	No	No	No	Yes
Tithing	Yes	Yes	No	No	No	No	No
Council on the Disposition of the Tithes	Yes	No	No	No	No	No	Yes
Prayer and prophecies of Joseph Smith; why many are called but few chosen	Yes	No	No	No	No	No	Yes
Destiny of Joseph Smith	Yes	No	No	No	No	No	Yes
Letter to church; duty in relation to their persecutors	Yes	No	No	No	No	No	Yes
Nauvoo Temple and Nauvoo House to be built; baptism for the dead	Yes	Yes	No	No	No	No	Yes
Saints in Iowa	Yes	No	No	No	No	No	Yes
To Brigham Young	Yes	No	No	No	No	No	Yes
Letter to church; baptism for the dead	Yes	Yes	No	No	No	No	Yes
Letter to church; baptism for the dead	Yes	Yes	No	No	No	No	Yes
Distinguishing the nature of angels and disembodied spirits	Yes	No	No	No	No	No	Yes
Various items of instruction; corporeal nature of God and Jesus Christ; intelligence; seer stones	Yes	No	No	No	No	No	Yes
Various items of instruction; celestial marriage; eternal life	Yes	No	No	No	No	No	Yes
Plural marriage; celestial marriage; sealing power; exaltation	Yes	No	No	No	No	No	Yes
Original "Appendix"; Second Coming; missionary work	Yes	Yes	No	No	No	No	Yes
secular governments and laws in general	Yes	Yes	No	No	No	No	Yes
Martyrdom of Joseph Smith and Hyrum Smith	Yes	Yes	No	No	No	No	Yes
Organization of Mormon pioneer westward journey	Yes	No	No	No	No	No	Yes
Salvation for the dead; salvation of little children	Yes	No	No	No	No	No	Yes
Jesus Christ preached to spirits in prison; salvation for the dead	Yes	No	No	No	No	No	Yes
Cessation of plural marriage	Yes	No	No	No	No	No	Yes
1978 Revelation on Priesthood: cessation of priesthood restrictions based on race	Yes	No	No	No	No	No	Yes
God's words to Moses	Yes (Pearl of Great Price)	Yes	No	No	No	No	No
Prophecy of Enoch	Yes (Pearl of Great Price)	Yes	No	No	No	No	No
General meeting of the quorums of the church to consider the labors of the committee charged with organizing publication of the revelations into a book	No	Yes	No	No	No	No	No
Declaration on marriage; one spouse only	No	Yes	No	No	No	No	No
Tithing	No	Yes	No	No	No	No	No
Calling of William Marks	No	Yes	No	No	No	No	No
Priesthood ordination of other races	No	Yes	No	No	No	No	No
Changes in leadership positions	No	Yes	No	No	No	No	No
Foreign missions	No	Yes	No	No	No	No	No
Instructions to the elders	No	Yes	No	No	No	No	No
Branch and district presidents	No	Yes	No	No	No	No	No
Changes in leadership positions	No	Yes	No	No	No	No	No
Duties of quorums	No	Yes	No	No	No	No	No
Lamoni College; church publications; relations with the LDS Church; doctrinal tracts; interpretation of various scriptures; gospel boat; branch in Detroit	No	Yes	No	No	No	No	No
Changes in leadership positions	No	Yes	No	No	No	No	No
Patriarchs; foreign missions	No	Yes	No	No	No	No	No
Quorums	No	Yes	No	No	No	No	No
Sanitarium	No	Yes	No	No	No	No	No
Organization and colonization	No	Yes	No	No	No	No	No
Changes in leadership positions	No	Yes	No	No	No	No	No
Changes in leadership positions	No	Yes	No	No	No	No	No
Presiding Bishopric	No	Yes	No	No	No	No	No
Presiding Bishop	No	Yes	No	No	No	No	No
Missionary work	No	Yes	No	No	No	No	No
Changes in leadership positions	No	Yes	No	No	No	No	No
Changes in leadership positions	No	Yes	No	No	No	No	No
Changes in leadership positions; unity	No	Yes	No	No	No	No	No
Changes in leadership positions	No	Yes	No	No	No	No	No
Changes in leadership positions; work toward Zion	No	Yes	No	No	No	No	No
Changes in leadership positions	No	Yes	No	No	No	No	No
Changes in leadership positions; Zion	No	Yes	No	No	No	No	No
Changes in leadership positions; counsel	No	Yes	No	No	No	No	No
Commendation; urge to work	No	Yes	No	No	No	No	No
Changes in leadership positions; counsel	No	Yes	No	No	No	No	No
New President of the Church named	No	Yes	No	No	No	No	No
Changes in leadership positions	No	Yes	No	No	No	No	No
Changes in leadership positions; unity commended	No	Yes	No	No	No	No	No
Changes in leadership positions; stewardship	No	Yes	No	No	No	No	No
Changes in leadership positions; counsel	No	Yes	No	No	No	No	No
Changes in leadership positions; relationship between ministerial programs; prepare to build temple at Independence	No	Yes	No	No	No	No	No
Clarification of 149	No	Yes	No	No	No	No	No
Changes in leadership positions; counsel on culture; Independence Temple preparation; ecology	No	Yes	No	No	No	No	No
Changes in leadership positions; reconciliation	No	Yes	No	No	No	No	No
New precedent on presidential succession; presidential successor named; changes in leadership positions; reconciliation	No	Yes	No	No	No	No	No
New President of the Church; changes in leadership positions; counsel on outreach	No	Yes	No	No	No	No	No
Changes in leadership positions; counsel on outreach	No	Yes	No	No	No	No	No
Changes in leadership positions; counsel on witness	No	Yes	No	No	No	No	No
Purpose of Independence Temple; priesthood opened to women; changes in leadership positions	No	Yes	No	No	No	No	No
Changes in leadership positions; unity; humility	No	Yes	No	No	No	No	No
Changes in leadership positions; the spiritual life	No	Yes	No	No	No	No	No
Changes in leadership positions; trusting the Spirit; Independence Temple accepted	No	Yes	No	No	No	No	No
New President of the Church named	No	Yes	No	No	No	No	No
Proclaim peace; reach out; patience; embrace differences; respect tradition	No	Yes	No	No	No	No	No
Be a prophetic people; diversity; tithing	No	Yes	No	No	No	No	No
Strive for peace; missionary work; use and misuse of scripture; equality; generosity	No	Yes	No	No	No	No	No
Effects of baptism, confirmation, and sacrament of the Lord's Supper; cultural awareness and sensitivity; flexibility in number of quorums of seventy; accelerate evangelism	No	Yes	No	No	No	No	No
Expand community, promote peace, and end poverty; tithing; unity in diversity; act in accordance to beliefs	No	Yes	No	No	No	No	No
Pearl of Great Price
Book of Moses	Yes	Yes	No	No	No	Yes	Yes
Book of Abraham	Yes	No	No	No	No	No	No
Joseph Smith–Matthew	Yes	Yes	No	No	No	Yes	Yes
Joseph Smith–History	Yes	No	No	No	No	No	No
Articles of Faith	Yes	Inspired	No	No	No	Inspired	Inspired
Latter Day Saint movement other religious text
The Word of the Lord	No	No	No	No	Yes	No	No
The Word of the Lord Brought to Mankind by an Angel	No	No	No	No	Yes	No	No
Lectures on Faith	No	No	No	No	No	Yes	Yes
Book of Jasher	No	No	No	No	No	No - not considered canonical	No
The Book of the Law of the Lord	No	No	No	No	No	Yes	No
Letter of Appointment	No	No	No	No	No	Yes	No

== See also ==
- Book of Joseph, untranslated scripture from Joseph Smith Papyri
- Kinderhook plates, incomplete non-canonized translation made by Joseph Smith
- Lectures on Faith, decanonized in 1921
- List of non-canonical revelations in the Church of Jesus Christ of Latter-day Saints
