= Church of Christ (Assured Way) =

Latter Day Saint movement denomination

The Church of Christ with the Elijah Message – The Assured Way of the Lord, Inc.
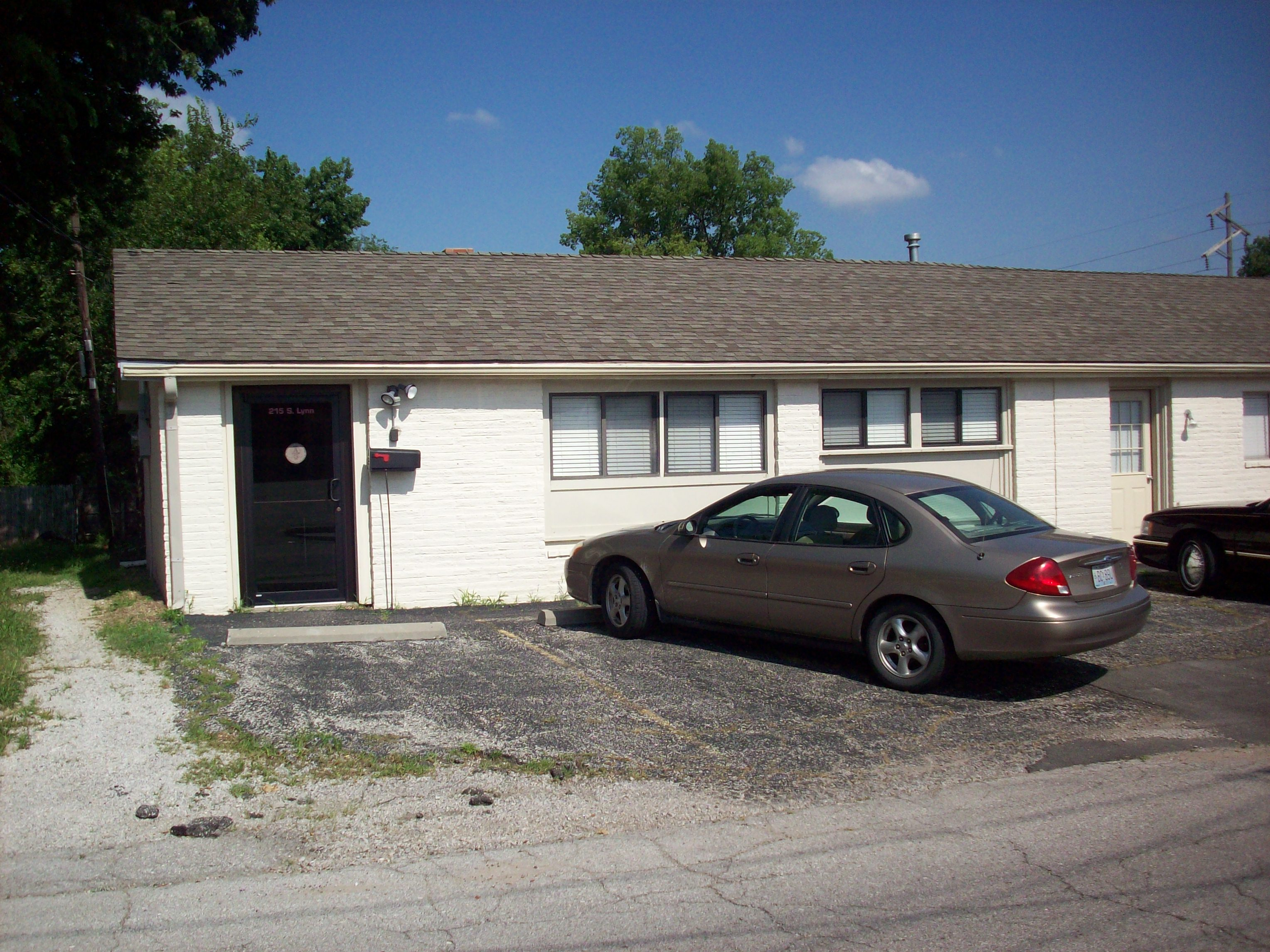
- Church of Christ meetinghouse and headquarters in Independence, Missouri
- Classification: Latter Day Saint movement
- Orientation: Latter Day Saints
- Polity: Church conference
- Moderator: None; all members of the Quorum of Twelve Apostles are equal
- Region: United States
- Founder: William Draves
- Origin: 2004
- Separated from: Church of Christ With the Elijah Message

The Church of Christ with the Elijah Message – The Assured Way of the Lord, Inc., informally called The Assured Way, is a denomination of the Latter Day Saint movement based in Independence, Missouri. Founded in the Democratic Republic of Congo in Africa by Apostle Bama wa Mobutu Gloire on August 20, 1994, and incorporated in the United States of America by Apostle Leonard H. Draves in 2004. The Assured Way church is one of four groups that trace their origin to the church founded by William Draves in 1943, after his split with Otto Fetting, who had founded the Church of Christ (also known as the "Fettingites"). Although all four churches have similar names and nearly identical doctrines, they are not in communion and maintain separate legal organizations. The Assured Way church was legally incorporated by Apostle Bama wa Mobutu Gloire in Africa in 1994. William Draves' son, Leonard Draves, legally incorporated the same church in the United States in 2004, six months after Leonard was removed from the ministry by other leaders of the Church of Christ with the Elijah Message, Inc. that was organized in 1994. Leonard Draves had previously founded the Church of Christ with the Elijah Message, Inc. in 1994, after breaking with the Church of Christ with the Elijah Message, Established Anew 1929.

== History ==
=== Otto Fetting ===
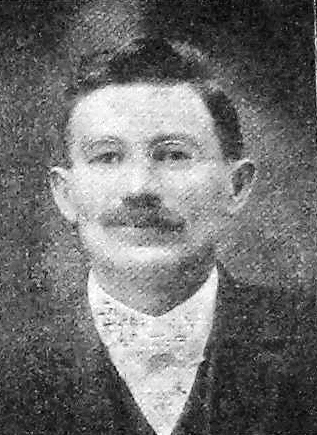
Otto Fetting in 1916

The Assured Way church has its origin in the Fettingite movement of the Hedrickite expression of the Latter Day Saint religion. Otto Fetting, an Apostle in the Temple Lot Church of Christ, during the early twentieth century, claimed to be receiving a series of messages from an unearthly "messenger" he identified as John the Baptist. While the first eleven of these missives were accepted by the Temple Lot organization, the twelfth was not, leading to Fetting's departure from the Temple Lot organization in 1929, and his founding of the Fettingite organization. The Temple Lot organization has since repudiated all of Fetting's messages, including the first eleven, which they had originally endorsed, at least tentatively.

=== William Draves ===
William A. Draves

Four years after Fetting's death, a Fettingite elder named William A. Draves from Nucla, Colorado claimed that the same messenger who had appeared to Fetting had begun to appear to him, as well. While the Fettingite organization was initially receptive to these new missives, it ultimately decided to reject them all, leading to a split in the church in 1943. Draves' adherents founded their own organization known as the Church of Christ with the Elijah Message, Established Anew 1929. Draves continued to claim revelations and recorded a total of 90 messages prior to his death in 1994. His adherents published these messages along with Fetting's in a book of scripture entitled The Word of the Lord Brought to Mankind by an Angel.

=== Founding of the Assured Way church ===
Prior to W.A. Draves's death in June 1994 the final three messages he had recorded reflected leadership disputes within The Church of Christ with the Elijah Message. These led to a division causing Apostles W.A. Draves, Leonard Draves and Mervyn Johnson to be blocked from church property by way of a restraining order. After a short legal battle, a failure to reconcile, and the death of W.A. Draves six of the twelve leading Apostles decided to reincorporate the Church under the name The Church of Christ with the Elijah Message, Inc. on August 1, 1994. The remaining five Apostles, including those who filed the above restraining order, retained the corporate name "The Church of Christ with the Elijah Message, Established Anew 1929" and all properties including the headquarters building at 608 Lacy Rd. Independence, Missouri.

In Africa Apostle Bama wa Mobutu Gloire the remnant of the group that was faithful members to William A Draves, founded and Established in the Democratic Republic of Congo in Africa, the Church of Christ with the Elijah Message the Assured Way of the Lord that they legally incorporated on August 20, 1994.

Less than a decade later in 2003, leaders in the new church organization removed Leonard Draves from ministry during a special apostles meeting. Draves responded by joining Apostle Bama wa Mobutu Gloire in Africa who Established the Church of Christ with the Elijah Message the Assured Way of the Lord on August 20, 1994, and organizing the same church in America an additional church known as the "Church of Christ with the Elijah Message (The Assured Way of the Lord)" in 2004. The parenthetical portion of the new name was added to give the new group a legal and separate distinction from the older Elijah Message churches.

The Assured Way church had six Apostles and four bishops serving in the United States as of 2010. A total of six "disciples" and three "vice bishops" each for the "East Africa Vineyard" and "West Africa Vineyard" had also been appointed. Where Apostle Leonard H Draves received Revelations from God to call Brother Apostle Bama wa Mobutu Gloire to be a member of the quorum of twelve Apostles in America and an Apostle of our Lord Jesus Christ to take care of the church in Africa and around the world.

The Church of Christ (Assured Way) was legally incorporated in the State of Missouri as "The Church of Christ With the Elijah Message, The Assured Way of the Lord, Inc.", in 2004. and in the Democratic Republic of Congo in Africa was incorporated by Apostle Bama wa Mobutu Gloire in 1994. Who extended the church in Kenya and other African Nations from 1986 when he was a young priest of only 16 years old in the church of Christ with the Elijah Message Established a new in 1929.

The Assured Way church publishes an official monthly periodical called The Greater Light.

== Doctrine ==
As with all Hedrickite organizations, the Church of Christ (Assured Way) beliefs are enumerated in the "Articles of Faith and Practice" first adopted by the Church of Christ (Temple Lot), and subsequently affirmed by the Church of Christ (Fettingite), the Church of Christ (Restored) and the Church of Christ with the Elijah Message. The articles accepted by the Fettingite, Elijah Message and Assured Way churches are all exactly identical, as the "messenger" commanded Fetting not to change them.

Beliefs shared in common between the Assured Way church and other Hedrickite organizations include:

- Belief in the King James Version Bible and the Book of Mormon (called the Record of the Nephites in the Assured Way church);
- Rejection of a First Presidency, high priests and the office of patriarch;
- Belief in a Quorum of Twelve Apostles as the highest earthly church authority, with all members being equal;
- Rejection of the Doctrine and Covenants and Pearl of Great Price;
- Belief in the construction of a temple on the Temple Lot in Independence, Missouri at some future time;
- Rejection of baptism for the Dead, polygamy and eternal marriage;
- Belief that while Joseph Smith, Jr. was indeed a true prophet of God, he made errors in judgment and teaching, and thus not everything he said or did is to be accepted as true doctrine or practice;
- Belief that revelation is not confined to holders of the priesthood, but may be given to any member of the church, male or female. However, only males may hold the priesthood.
- Belief that clergy and members should abstain from alcoholic beverages, tobacco and illegal drugs (there is no prohibition of coffee and tea).
- In common with other Fettingite churches, the Assured Way church believes in the revelations allegedly given to Otto Fetting and William Draves, also believing that when John the Baptist laid hands upon Fetting, he conferred what is referred to as "a greater authority" that had not previously been given, to "set in order" the scattered Latter Day Saint movement. This does not mean that the Assured Way church believes that the priesthood had been taken from the earth after Joseph Smith's time, but rather that the "messenger" (whom Fetting and Draves identified with John the Baptist) had come to bring order to the scattered Restoration Movement and give Fetting a special power and authority that Latter Day Saint leaders prior to him had lacked. The Church of Christ (Assured Way) believes that this authority continues within their organization today, which they regard as the sole legitimate church on earth.

Unlike some other Hedrickite churches (such as the Temple Lot church), the Assured Way church denies the idea of three beings in the Godhead, insisting that the Father, Son and Holy Ghost are all one person.

== See also ==
- Factional breakdown: Followers of Granville Hedrick

== Bibliography ==
- Jason R. Smith, “Scattering of the Hedrickites,” in Scattering of the Saints: Schism within Mormonism, ed. Newell G. Bringhurst and John C. Hamer (Independence, Missouri: John Whitmer Books, 2007), 224–246.
- Steven L. Shields, Divergent Paths of the Restoration, (Los Angeles, California: Restoration Research, 1990).
