= Shiloh (biblical figure) =

Figure mentioned in the Hebrew Bible

Shiloh (/ˈʃaɪloʊ/; Biblical Hebrew: שִׁילֹה, romanized: šīlō; Modern Hebrew: שילו, romanized: šīlōh) is a figure mentioned in the book of Genesis 49:10 of the Hebrew Bible as part of the benediction given by Jacob to his son Judah. Jacob states that "the sceptre will not depart from Judah... until Shiloh comes..."

== Versions and translations ==
The Latin Vulgate translates the word as "he ... that is to be sent" (Latin: donec veniate qui mittendum est), which would be the equivalent of the Hebrew shaluach (שלוח, 'messenger'), indicating a possible corruption of the text (on either side). The Peshitta has "the one to whom [it] belongs". Similarly, the Septuagint translates the word as "the things stored up for him".

Some English translations retain the word "Shiloh", either as a title ("until Shiloh come," King James Version) or as a place name ("as long as men come to Shiloh," JPS Tanakh). Other Christian translations render the whole phrase in English, yielding "until he comes to whom it belongs" (Revised Standard Version), "until tribute comes to him" (English Standard Version), or "until He whose right it is comes" (Holman Christian Standard Bible).

== Interpretation ==
"How goodly are your tents, O Jacob!" Balaam saw that the entrances of the Israelite tents: how goodly are the "tents" of Shiloh and the Temple, where the Israelites offer sacrifices to atone for their sins.

— Rebbe Nachman of Breslov, Rebbe Nachman's Torah: Numbers–Deuteronomy

The reference to sceptre and the Tribe of Judah has led many to view this verse as a Messianic prophecy. Genesis 49:9 (Note: Judah is a lion’s whelp; On prey, my son, have you grown. He crouches, lies down like a lion, Like a lioness—who dare rouse him? — Revised JPS Version) mentions the lion of Judah, which is recalled in the Latin Christian prayer "Exorcism Against Satan and the Apostate Angels" (a.k.a. the "Prayer to St. Michael"). Specifically, the exorcist calls upon the Lion of the Tribe of Judah—interpreted as Jesus by the Christian author of the prayer—while indicating that Jesus holds the scepter of King David—whom Christians believe is his ancestor—and the prophet Moses. The relevant part of the prayer reads:

Leo de tríbu Júda, rádix Dávid.
The Lion of the Tribe of Judah, the root of David has conquered.

According to Rashi, an important Jewish scholar and rabbi of the mid-11th and early 12th centuries CE, Shiloh is associated with both Moses and the Mashiakh. The Zohar, a foundational work of Jewish mysticism authored in the Middle Ages, notes that Shiloh (שילה) and MoSheH (משה) have an equal gematria:

According to another explanation, the words "no shrub of the field was yet in the earth" refer to the first Messiah, and the words "no herb of the field had yet sprung up" refer to the second Messiah. Why had they not shot forth? Because Moses was not there to serve the Shekinah—Moses, of whom it is written, "and there was no man to till the ground". This is also hinted at in the verse "the sceptre shall not depart from Judah nor the ruler's staff from between his feet", [with] "the sceptre" referring to the Messiah of the house of Judah, and "the staff" to the Messiah of the house of Joseph. "Until Shiloh cometh": this is Moses, the numerical value of the two names Shiloh and Moses being the same.

— Zohar § Bereshit 21:234

The above interpretation dates back at least to the Aramaic Targum Onkelos of the first century CE and was later widely understood by Christians to refer to the promised Messiah in most traditional Israelite beliefs and writings.

Among some Christians, "Shiloh" is seen as a reference to Jesus, whom they believe to have fulfilled the earlier prophecies of the Torah. The word Shiloh is not specifically mentioned in the New Testament, but some have connected it to the Pool of Siloam, referred to in a story of Jesus healing of the man born blind in the book of John. However, Genesis 49:10 became a major messianic text appealed to by the Church Fathers. The Christian messianic interpretation is found in the capitalisation of the pronoun "He" in the Holman Christian Standard Bible ("until He whose right it is comes").

Some Christian scholars note that Shiloh is not found as a personal name in the Old Testament (Hebrew Bible). Others interpret it as a place name, but they consider this less likely.

== Latter Day Saint movement ==
In the Church of Jesus Christ of Latter-day Saints and according Joseph Smith Jr. "Shiloh" is a name of the messiah Jesus Christ.

In one of the sacred books of the Church of Christ with the Elijah Message called The Word of the Lord or The Word of the Lord Brought to Mankind by an Angel God says that "Shiloh" is one of his names along with "Jehovah", "Jesus Christ" and others.

== Islamic interpretation ==
According to Muslims, Muhammad is identified as Shiloh, with a particular reference to Quran 3:81.

== See also ==
- Lion of the Tribe of Judah
- Joanna Southcott
