= Articles of Faith (Latter Day Saints) =

Statements of beliefs in the Latter Day Saint movement

Within the Latter Day Saint movement, the "Articles of Faith" is a statement of beliefs composed by Joseph Smith as part of an 1842 letter sent to "Long" John Wentworth, editor of the Chicago Democrat, and first published in the Latter Day Saint newspaper Times and Seasons. It is a concise listing of thirteen fundamental doctrines of Mormonism. Most Latter Day Saint denominations view the articles as an authoritative statement of basic theology. Some denominations, such as the Church of Jesus Christ of Latter-day Saints (LDS Church), have adopted the articles as scripture (see Pearl of Great Price). For some sects, the Articles of Faith are known collectively as "An Epitome of Faith and Doctrine".

== Wording ==
The full text is reproduced here. Later alterations to the text made by the LDS Church are indicated by strikethroughs and brackets.

=== Articles 1–4 ===
Articles one through four read as follows:

1. We believe in God, the Eternal Father, and in His Son, Jesus Christ, and in the Holy Ghost.
2. We believe that men will be punished for their own sins, and not for Adam's transgression.
3. We believe that through the Atonement of Christ, all mankind may be saved, by obedience to the laws and ordinances of the Gospel.
4. We believe that ~~these ordinances~~ (Note: Additions and replacements made in 1902) [the first principles and ordinances of the Gospel] are: ~~1st~~ [first], Faith in the Lord Jesus Christ; ~~2d~~ [second], Repentance; ~~3d~~ [third], Baptism by immersion for the remission of sins; ~~4th~~ [fourth], Laying on of hands for the gift of the Holy Ghost.

The first four articles state basic doctrines of the Latter Day Saint movement. The first is often understood to state the doctrine of the Godhead. The second specifically rejects the teaching of original sin. The third states belief in the atonement of Christ taking effect for potentially all individuals (as opposed to double predestination) conditional on following the laws and ordinances of the Gospel (as opposed to unconditional election). The fourth states the core principles and ordinances of faith, repentance, baptism and confirmation for the gift of the Holy Ghost.

=== Articles 5–6 ===
The fifth and sixth articles state beliefs regarding how the church should be organized; in particular, the requirement of ordination to the priesthood and prophetic governance through the use of priesthood keys to administer valid and licit ordinances (as opposed to a priesthood of all believers). The belief in a church polity including apostles, prophets and evangelists is also stated.

5. We believe that a man must be called of God[,] by ~~"~~prophecy, and by the laying on of hands~~"~~ by those who are in authority[,] to preach the Gospel and administer in the ordinances thereof.
6. We believe in the same organization that existed in the [P]rimitive [C]hurch, ~~viz:~~ [namely,] apostles, prophets, pastors, teachers, evangelists[,] ~~&c~~ [and so forth].

=== Articles 7–9 ===
Articles 7–9 state beliefs in sources of revelation: in gifts of the Spirit, in the Bible and Book of Mormon, and in continuing revelation:

7. We believe in the gift of tongues, prophecy, revelation, visions, healing, interpretation of tongues, ~~&c~~ and so forth.
8. We believe the Bible to be the word of God as far as it is translated correctly; we also believe the Book of Mormon to be the word of God.
9. We believe all that God has revealed, all that [H]e does now reveal, and we believe that He will yet reveal many great and important things pertaining to the Kingdom of God.

=== Articles 10–12 ===
Articles 10–12 state beliefs in the gathering of Israel, establishes ethics for religious freedom, and proper conduct for church members in society:

10. We believe in the literal gathering of Israel and in the restoration of the Ten Tribes[;] [t]hat Zion [(the New Jerusalem)] will be built upon ~~this~~ [the] [American] (Note: Added in 1851) continent[;] [t]hat Christ will reign personally upon the earth[;] and[,] that the earth will be renewed and receive its paradisiac[al] glory.
11. We claim the privilege of worshiping Almighty God according to the dictates of our [own] conscience, and allow all men the same privilege[,] let them worship how, where, or what they may.
12. We believe in being subject to kings, presidents, rulers, and magistrates, in obeying, honoring, and sustaining the law.

=== Article 13 ===
The thirteenth article states beliefs in how one should conduct oneself. The "admonition of Paul" referenced appears to be Philippians 4:8.

13. We believe in being honest, true, chaste, benevolent, virtuous, and in doing good to all men; indeed, we may say that we follow the admonition of Paul [—] ~~"~~[W]e believe all things[,] we hope all things,~~"~~ we have endured many things[,] and hope to be able to endure all things. If there is anything virtuous, lovely, or of good report or ~~praise worthy~~ [praiseworthy,] we seek after these things.

== Earlier Latter Day Saint creeds ==
The Articles of Faith are similar to, and may have been partially derived from, an earlier eight-article creed written by Oliver Cowdery:

1. We believe in God, and his Son Jesus Christ.
2. We believe that God, from the beginning, revealed himself to man; and that whenever he has had a people on earth, he always has revealed himself to them by the Holy Ghost, the ministering of angels, or his own voice. We do not believe that he ever had a church on earth without revealing himself to that church: consequently, there were apostles, prophets, evangelists, pastors, and teachers, in the same.
3. We believe that God is the same in all ages; and that it requires the same holiness, purity, and religion, to save a man now, as it did anciently; and that as HE is no respecter of persons, always has, and always will reveal himself to men when they call upon him.
4. We believe that God has revealed himself to men in this age, and commenced to raise up a church preparatory to his second advent, when he will come in the clouds of heaven with power and great glory.
5. We believe that the popular religious theories of the day are incorrect; that they are without parallel in the revelations of God, as sanctioned by him; and that however faithfully they may be adhered to, or however zealously and warmly they may be defended, they will never stand the strict scrutiny of the word of life.
6. We believe that all men are born free and equal; that no man, combination of men, or government of men, have power or authority to compel or force others to embrace any system of religion, or religious creed, or to use force or violence to prevent others from enjoying their own opinions, or practicing the same, so long as they do not molest or disturb others in theirs, in a manner to deprive them of their privileges as free citizens-or of worshiping [worshipping] God as they choose, and that any attempt to the contrary is an assumption unwarrantable in the revelations of heaven, and strikes at the root of civil liberty, and is a subvertion [subversion] of all equitable principles between man and man.
7. We believe that God has set his hand the second time to recover the remnant of his people, Israel; and that the time is near when he will bring them from the four winds, with songs of everlasting joy, and reinstate them upon their own lands which he gave their fathers by covenant.
8. And further: We believe in embracing good wherever it may be found; of proving all things, and holding fast that which is righteous.

Subsequent early creeds predating the Wentworth Letter included a five-article creed by Joseph Young, an eighteen-article creed by Parley P. Pratt, a nineteen-article creed by Orson Pratt and a sixteen-article creed by Orson Hyde.

== Other versions ==
A similar but altered version of the creed with fourteen articles was published by James H. Flanigan in April 1849 in England, and quoted in some other nineteenth-century sources. This inserted an additional article after the tenth ("We believe in the literal resurrection of the body, and that the dead in Christ will rise first, and that the rest of the dead live not again until the thousand years are expired."), and made various other changes, such as giving a longer list of gifts of the spirit in the seventh article, appending "the Lord's supper" to the list of ordinances in the fourth article, mentioning "all other good books" in the eighth article, and appending "looking forward to the 'recompense of reward.'" to the last article, amongst other changes. This version is sometimes mistaken as being the original.

A significantly longer, extended revision of the creed, which contains twenty-five articles and is known as the Articles of Faith and Practice, is used by the Church of Christ (Temple Lot), the Church of Christ (Fettingite), the Church of Christ with the Elijah Message and the Church of Christ with the Elijah Message (Assured Way). The Word of the Lord, regarded as scriptural by the Fettingites and by both Elijah Message groups, declares these articles to be inspired and forbids changing their wording. The version currently published by the Temple Lot group has a different version of Article 20 to the version used by the other groups, denouncing cohabitation and same-sex marriage in addition to plural marriage.

== See also ==
- George Goddard (Mormon)
- The Family: A Proclamation to the World

Pearl of Great Price
| Preceded by Joseph Smith–History | Pearl of Great Price | End |
