= Pauline Hancock =

American Mormon leader

- Born: Pauline Bailey; November 3, 1903
- Died: October 19, 1962 (aged 58)
- Known for: First woman to found and lead a denomination in the Latter Day Saint movement.
- Spouse: Silas R Hancock (1899–1959)
- Parent: John William Alexander Bailey (1877–1959)

Pauline Bailey Hancock (November 3, 1903 – October 19, 1962) was the founder of the Church of Christ (Hancock) in Independence, Missouri in 1946, and was the first woman to found and lead a denomination in the Latter Day Saint movement.

A former member of the Reorganized Church of Jesus Christ of Latter Day Saints and then later the Church of Christ (Temple Lot), Hancock was excommunicated from the Temple Lot church in 1935, due to differences between her view of the Godhead and theirs. She later claimed a vision of Jesus Christ, who told her to "go and teach," leading her to found her own church in 1946. She would lead this church until her death in 1962.

== Early life and Latter Day Saint heritage ==
Pauline Bailey was a member of the Reorganized Church of Jesus Christ of Latter Day Saints (now called the Community of Christ), whose father had been a minister of that denomination in Salt Lake City, Utah. She moved to Independence, Missouri in 1923 after marrying Silas Hancock. During the Supreme Directional Control controversy of the 1920s, she opposed President Frederick M. Smith's attempt to take "supreme directional control" over the RLDS church; she later transferred her membership to the Church of Christ (Temple Lot). In 1935, following the excommunication of her friend Apostle Samuel Wood of the Temple Lot church (who was expelled for believing in a modalistic view of the Godhead, a view Hancock supported), Hancock resigned from that organization.

== Seeing a vision ==
Hancock later claimed to have had a vision in which God told her to "go and teach others." Her account of this vision is as follows:

"I was reading in our living room, when all of a sudden I saw a marvelous vision. It seemed that I was taken to Jerusalem and I saw a man seated upon what looked like a stool. All around and about him, men were mocking, bowing and making fun of this individual.... I continued to watch as he was condemned to death and a crown of thorns was placed on his head.... I knew that there was nothing good in me except God had put it there.... I knew I had to have this Jesus or die.... I fell upon my knees and prayed to God through Jesus and His shed blood, to be forgiven of my sins.... When my prayer was finished, God baptized me with His own spirit and my soul was on fire with love towards God and mankind - I became a new creature....

God spoke to me then and said: 'Now go and teach all people what I have shown you - for I am the way.' I answered Him that I couldn't do that and He said, 'I will be with you.' I said, 'I am a woman and they won't receive me.' He said, 'I wasn't a woman and they didn't receive me - go teach and I'll be with you.'

Blessed by the name of God. Yes, He calls women. He called me".

== Founding a church ==
Hancock subsequently founded her own organization to propagate her teachings and visions, which included one of Jesus being crucified that led her to believe she had become "a new creature". Hancock's organization rejected the Doctrine and Covenants of their parent church, as well as the Pearl of Great Price used by the LDS Church, retaining only the King James Bible and the Book of Mormon. She adopted a modalistic view of God, insisting that the Father, Son and Holy Spirit were merely manifestation of the same, one God. The organization bought property in Independence and built a submerged sanctuary that became locally known as the "basement church" because most of it was underground.

Hancock exercised functions normally reserved solely to men during this time in Latter Day Saint history, such as performing baptisms and administering other ordinances, as well as preaching. She did not claim any formal title, but remained the undisputed leader of her church from its founding until the time of her death.

== Death and aftermath ==
Hancock died in 1962, still accepting the Book of Mormon as a valid work of scripture. However, following her death members of her church, including Jerald and Sandra Tanner, began to question the authenticity of the Book of Mormon, which led to Hancock's church rejecting it in 1973. Her church continued to function for a time strictly as a Protestant denomination, but later chose to dissolve itself in 1984, after which its members mostly joined with various Evangelical Protestant churches. Hancock's "basement church" was used by a Protestant church for a time, but was later sold to a local Restoration Branch, which constructed an above-ground sanctuary atop the old structure.

Her husband, Silas Hanock, was buried on June 27, 1959 in Warrensburg, Missouri. His exact date of death is unavailable.
