= Otto Fetting =

American Latter Day Saints pastor (1871–1933)

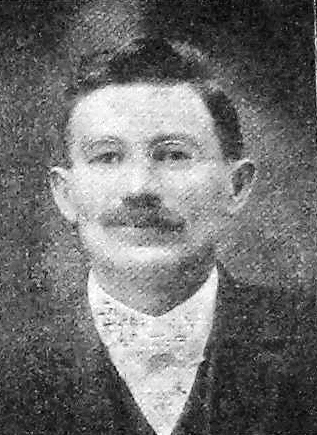

Founder of the Church of Christ (Fettingite)
- April 8, 1930 – January 30, 1933

Apostle in the Church of Christ (Temple Lot)
- 1926 – October 1929

Pastor and Evangelist in the RLDS Church
- 1899 – 1925

Personal details
- Born: November 20, 1871; Port Huron, Michigan
- Died: January 30, 1933 (aged 61); Goodells, Michigan, Michigan
- Spouse(s): Jennie M. Fetting
- Children: Roy Fetting

Otto Fetting (November 20, 1871 – January 30, 1933) was an American realtor and editor from Port Huron, Michigan who served first as a pastor and evangelist in the Reorganized Church of Jesus Christ of Latter Day Saints, and then later as an apostle in the Church of Christ (Temple Lot), commonly referred to as the "Hedrickites". Fetting claimed to have been visited by John the Baptist thirty or more times between February 4, 1927 and his death on January 30, 1933. Fetting was reportedly given instruction concerning the doctrine and practices of Hedrickites and other factions of Christianity, together with directives to begin construction of a temple on the Temple Lot, including its exact dimensions.

After initially accepting his first eleven revelations, a Hedrickite conference vote in early October 1929 rejected a key portion of Fetting's twelfth message, leading him to found the "Church of Jesus Christ" on April 8, 1930. This breakaway faction, later referred to as "Church of Christ", subsequently gave birth to additional rival factions after Fetting's death, which have still further subdivided. These "Fettingite" or "Dravesite" (named after W.A. Draves, a follower of Fetting) factions include: the Church of Christ "With the Elijah Message" Established Anew 1929; the Church of Christ (Restored); the Church of Christ (Assured Way); and the Church of Christ at Halley's Bluff.

== Early life ==
Otto Fetting was born in Casco, Michigan. Eventually making his home in nearby Port Huron, Michigan, he was baptised into the Reorganized Church of Jesus Christ of Latter Day Saints on February 9, 1891, and ordained to its priesthood in 1899.

Fetting married Jennette Maria "Jennie" Mills (1874–1969) on January 30, 1893 in Applegate, Michigan, with whom he had one son, Roy Earl Fetting (1896–1971).

In 1925, dismayed by the "Supreme Directional Control" controversy within the RLDS church, Fetting switched his allegiance to the Temple Lot organization. At the time, this did not require rebaptism or reordination, as each group accepted the priesthood and sacraments of the other. In the spring of 1926, he was among seven men ordained to be Apostles in the Church of Christ.

== Visitation by John the Baptist ==
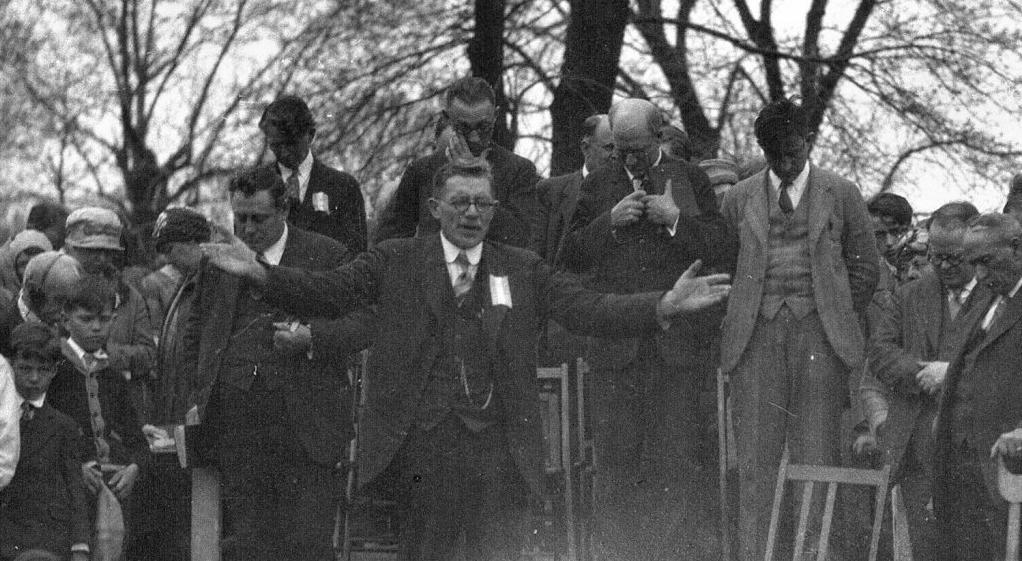
Otto Fetting on April 6, 1929 praying at a groundbreaking ceremony for a proposed Temple.

On February 4, 1927, Fetting claimed that he had been visited by John the Baptist, who delivered a message for him to give to the Hedrickite organization. This message commanded construction of the long-awaited Temple in Independence, Missouri, first foretold by Latter Day Saint founder Joseph Smith in 1831. The Temple Lot church had a long history of direction via revelation and angel visits, and thus was originally receptive to these alleged visits of the Biblical prophet, publishing Fetting's messages in their monthly periodical Zion's Advocate. They also began work on the temple with a groundbreaking ceremony held on April 6, 1929. According to Fetting, the Hedrickites were given seven years to complete the structure.

Fetting's "visitor" revealed various architectural details for the building, and specifically directed surveyors to move their markers ten feet to the east of where they had originally been placed. The angel also revealed the location of two of Joseph Smith's original marker stones, which Smith had buried ninety-eight years before to indicate the location for his planned temple. He also indicated that the "Articles of Faith and Practice" of the Temple Lot church were correct, and should not be changed from their original form. On other occasions, the messenger indicated particular men to be ordained within the organization, including to its Quorum of Twelve Apostles.

== The twelfth message ==
Although the Temple Lot organization had enthusiastically accepted the first eleven of Fetting's messages, this would not hold true for the twelfth. In verse four of this missive, John the Baptist states that all persons coming into the Church of Christ must be rebaptized, as "the Lord has rejected all creeds and factions of men". While this reflects the practice of the majority of Latter Day Saint denominations (including the Temple Lot church itself, today), it did not reflect the policy of the Temple Lot church at the time, which accepted members during this period from the Reorganized church, certain other Latter Day Saint organizations, and Joseph Smith's pre-1844 church on their original baptisms. This message equally declared Fetting to have been given the same "keys to the priesthood" that were given to Joseph Smith and Oliver Cowdery on May 15, 1829.

Controversy over the meaning and application of Fetting's twelfth message became so great that Fetting himself was "silenced" in October 1929 by the Temple Lot organization. Choosing to withdraw rather than continue under such a restriction, Fetting led approximately 1,400, or one-third, of the Church of Christ members (including some of its apostles) to found an organization of his own, which became known as the Church of Christ (Fettingite). Since the main Temple Lot organization retained possession of the Temple Lot and its meetinghouse, Fetting's organization met in members' homes for a considerable period prior to building their own worship facilities.

== Death and testimonial ==
Fetting would be visited a total of 30 times by his "messenger" prior to his death on January 30, 1933. To the end of his life, Fetting insisted upon the veracity of his heavenly visitor, and the truth of the messages he was given. He authored the following testimony in 1929:

TO WHOM IT MAY CONCERN:

I make this solemn declaration before God this day, God being my witness, and I expect some day to stand before the judgement bar to answer for this statement.

The manifestation and words of the visits of the Messenger are true. I have seen him from time to time. I heard his voice, I've seen his face, I saw the light, I felt his hand on my head and the slap on my shoulder. I was enwrapt in that wonderful Heavenly and Divine power, and the words I have given you are not my words, but the words God sent by John the Baptist.

I want to make this statement, so that everyone may know that this is true; it matters little what will become of me hereafter, but I cannot, nor will not, deny the things I have seen and heard from the Heavenly Messenger as long as I have my right mind, and God gives me life and His grace to endure here on Earth.

Others may make statements about me, but I want this to be understood that this statement is true. And I shall abide by the advice and instructions given by the Messenger regardless of what men may say.

Signed Otto Fetting

Independence, Missouri, October 9, 1929

Four other people claimed to have seen John the Baptist during his final visit to Fetting, and their testimony was notarized.

Fetting was buried in Zion Cemetery in Watertown, Michigan (now part of Sandusky).

== Division of the Fettingite organization ==
Four years after Fetting's death, a young Fettingite Elder named William A. Draves from Nucla, Colorado claimed that the same messenger who had appeared to Fetting had begun to appear to him, as well. While many of Fetting's followers accepted Draves and his messages, some did not, leading to a split in the Fettingite organization in 1939. Draves' adherents formed the Church of Christ with the Elijah Message, which claims to be the sole legitimate continuance of Fetting's original organization. Draves himself would receive a total of 90 messages prior to his death in 1994, all of which were combined with Fetting's into a book entitled The Word of the Lord Brought to Mankind by an Angel.

The Fettingites who rejected Draves' claims later split into two separate organizations, divided by the decision of the Church of Christ (Fettingite)—the remnant in Independence who rejected William Draves' claims—to introduce the Saturday Sabbath into their organization during the 1950s under Apostle S.T. Bronson. A group of congregations in Louisiana and Mississippi, under the leadership of A.C. DeWolf, rejected this change and formed the Church of Christ (Restored), which continues to observe Sunday as their day of worship.

Other than disagreeing as to the proper day for worship, the "Bronsonite" and "DeWolf" organizations remain virtually identical in doctrine and practice. Both of them accept Fetting's ministry and messages, but not Draves'. Each rejects the other, and considers itself the sole true continuation of Otto Fetting's church. Draves' organization, on the other hand, rejects both of these groups, accepting their founder's messages and those of Otto Fetting.

The Church of Christ at Halley's Bluff has no connection with any of these organizations, though it does accept Fetting's message (but not those of Draves).
