= Supreme directional control =

1920s Community of Christ leadership controversy

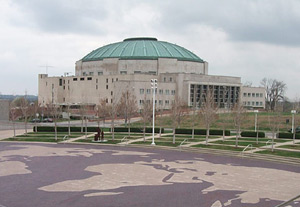
Community of Christ Auditorium adjacent to the Temple Lot in Independence, Missouri, one of the projects begun after the confirmation of Supreme Directional Control in 1925

The Supreme directional control controversy was a dispute among the leadership quorums of Community of Christ (then known as the Reorganized Church of Jesus Christ of Latter Day Saints), the Latter Day Saint movement's second largest denomination. It occurred during the 1920s and caused lasting repercussions. President Frederick M. Smith asserted that First Presidency decisions were binding on the church, preempting even General Conference votes. Some church leaders and hundreds of other members left Community of Christ for other Latter Day Saint churches, particularly the Church of Christ (Temple Lot). Although Dr. Smith was initially successful in asserting the First Presidency's authority over the Council of Twelve Apostles and Presiding Bishopric, the ensuing schism persisted, and the administrative changes were short-lived. By 1931, the church's debts and the onset of the Great Depression allowed the Bishopric to reassert its authority over church finances.

== Origin of the controversy ==
From its beginnings, the Latter Day Saint movement has been concerned with the idea of Zion, though the exact nature of this concept has varied from denomination to denomination and even from generation to generation. Frederick M. Smith, president of Community of Christ during the 1920s, wished to apply principles of the newly emerging fields of sociology and social welfare to his church's concept of Zion. Holder of a Ph.D. in psychology from Clark University, Smith was deeply interested in the Social Gospel movement, which endeavored to apply Christian ethics to problems including social justice, health care, and care for the poor, for the orphans, and the elderly. In broad terms, Smith felt the need to address these issues as part of the overall call to "build Zion", which had formed a cornerstone of the Latter Day Saint movement since its inception under Smith's grandfather, Joseph Smith Jr. In this way, Smith hoped to modernize his predecessor's vision of building a literal city of Zion in Independence, Missouri.

However, since many church members did not share Smith's modernistic vision of Zion, the RLDS leader faced the possibility that his dreams might be stymied through the opposition of other church authorities, or of the biennial General Conference. In contrast to the larger and better-known LDS church, Community of Christ had a longstanding tradition of dissention and debate within its organization based upon its interpretation of the concept of "common consent". In contrast to the Utah LDS membership, who tend to stress unquestioning conformity to the directives of church leadership, some RLDS laity and clergy held that even after adoption of a policy, members might continue to debate or even ignore its provisions if they felt it to be wrong. More authoritarian and blunt-spoken than his father, Joseph Smith III, Frederick Smith accepted the right of members to debate church policy prior to its formulation, but not afterwards.

== Core dispute ==
In April 1924, at a meeting of the Joint Council of Community of Christ leaders, composed of members of the First Presidency, Council of Twelve, and Presiding Bishopric, Frederick M. Smith presented a document, which became known as the "Supreme Directional Control document". In it Smith asserted that "there must be recognized grades of official prerogative and responsibility, with supreme directional control resting in the Presidency as the chief and first quorum of the church." Although Smith assured fellow leaders that "this control is presumed to be beneficent," he insisted that "effective administration is imperative, and organic solidarity is maintained only by effective discipline." Four apostles and the entire Presiding Bishopric disputed Smith's assertions and authored a critical "open letter", which was published in the June 1924 issue of the Saints' Herald, the official church magazine. These leaders asserted that the General Conference was the highest authority of the church, and furthermore insisted that the Presiding Bishopric—not the First Presidency—had full authority over church finances between conferences. The ongoing dispute spilled over from the presiding quorums into the membership, with some laity siding with President Smith, and others with the dissidents.

The crisis came to a head during the April 1925 General Conference. Smith's brother Israel A. Smith, a member of the Presiding Bishopric (who would later succeed his brother as church president), feared terrible consequences if President Smith forced a vote on his Supreme Directional Control document. In a letter to his brother dated April 5, Israel wrote: "If you, because of the mere force of numbers, drive out the strong belief and feelings of the opposition, you shall become responsible to that degree of falling away, the loss of faith, the division which may ensue." The document was debated for a full five days, April 7–11, and finally passed on a vote of 915 to 405, becoming General Conference Resolution (GCR) 849. In response, the Presiding Bishopric resigned, along with Apostle John Rushton; the conference also failed to sustain a second opposition apostle, Thomas W. Williams, ending his ministry in that office. On April 18, Smith issued a revelation (enshrined as Section 135 in the Community of Christ's Doctrine and Covenants) indicating divine approval of his course of action with regard to the Supreme Directional Control document and the resignation of the Bishopric.

The First Presidency's successful assertion of Supreme Directional Control allowed Frederick M. Smith to commence his Zionic endeavor. He began by increasing the church's administrative apparatus, expanding its social programs, and initiating a series of building programs. New projects included the Auditorium and a rebuilt Independence Sanitarium hospital. The church borrowed heavily to finance these programs, with its debt reaching $1.9 million by 1931 ($31.5 million in 2024 dollars). The concurrent onset of the Great Depression caused revenues from tithes and offerings to drop precipitously, which led the 1931 General Conference to pass a resolution returning control over all financial matters to the Presiding Bishopric, whose members became answerable solely to the Conference. This resolution, GCR 915, effectively reversed Supreme Directional Control. The Bishopric instituted a series of severe austerity measures, drastically cutting church staff and services, and the debt was finally retired in 1942.

== Schisms ==
After leaving the Council of Twelve in 1925 because of his opposition to Supreme Directional Control, Thomas W. Williams and other leaders formed a "Protest Movement", which later organized as a separate church known as the "Church of Jesus Christ (Thomas W. Williams)". Williams and his group issued a "Protest Document", charging that "this change from a theocratic democracy to an autocracy—a hierarchy with final and supreme directional control in the hands of one man strikes at the very heart of the principles of church government contained in our standard books...." The Protest Movement and its church organization dissolved within a decade, with many of its members joining the Church of Christ (Temple Lot) or other Latter Day Saint bodies.

Beginning in 1918, Community of Christ and the Church of Christ (Temple Lot) had entered into an "Agreement of Working Harmony". The agreement included mutual recognition of each church's priesthood, allowing members to transfer their membership from one church to the other without needing to be rebaptized, in contrast to the prevailing standard practice within the Restoration Movement (then and now). In April 1925, Daniel Macgregor, a vigorous opponent of Supreme Directional Control, transferred his membership from the Community of Christ to the Temple Lot church, where he was ultimately named an Apostle. Macgregor was followed by hundreds of other RLDS opponents of Supreme Directional Control. By the time of the Church of Christ (Temple Lot)'s October 1925 General Conference, its membership had grown from about 100 to about 500, mostly at the expense of Community of Christ. However, further membership losses dropped to a trickle with the passing of the controversy, and Community of Christ would not face a serious challenge to its leadership or membership figures until the emergence of a 1980s controversy over the ordination of women, which ultimately led to the formation of the Restoration Branches movement. Debate continued within the church during the following decades over the propriety of Smith's assertions concerning presidential authority, together with his vision of Zion as compared to that of his predecessors. Today, members of Community of Christ tend to subscribe to the social gospel advocated by Smith, while rejecting his authoritarian approach to church administration.

Supreme Directional Control is no longer advanced by the members of Community of Christ's First Presidency, although within the Restoration Branches movement many believe it is the reason that the First Presidency was able to change church doctrine so drastically.
