= Church of Christ (Fettingite) =

Latter Day Saint movement denomination

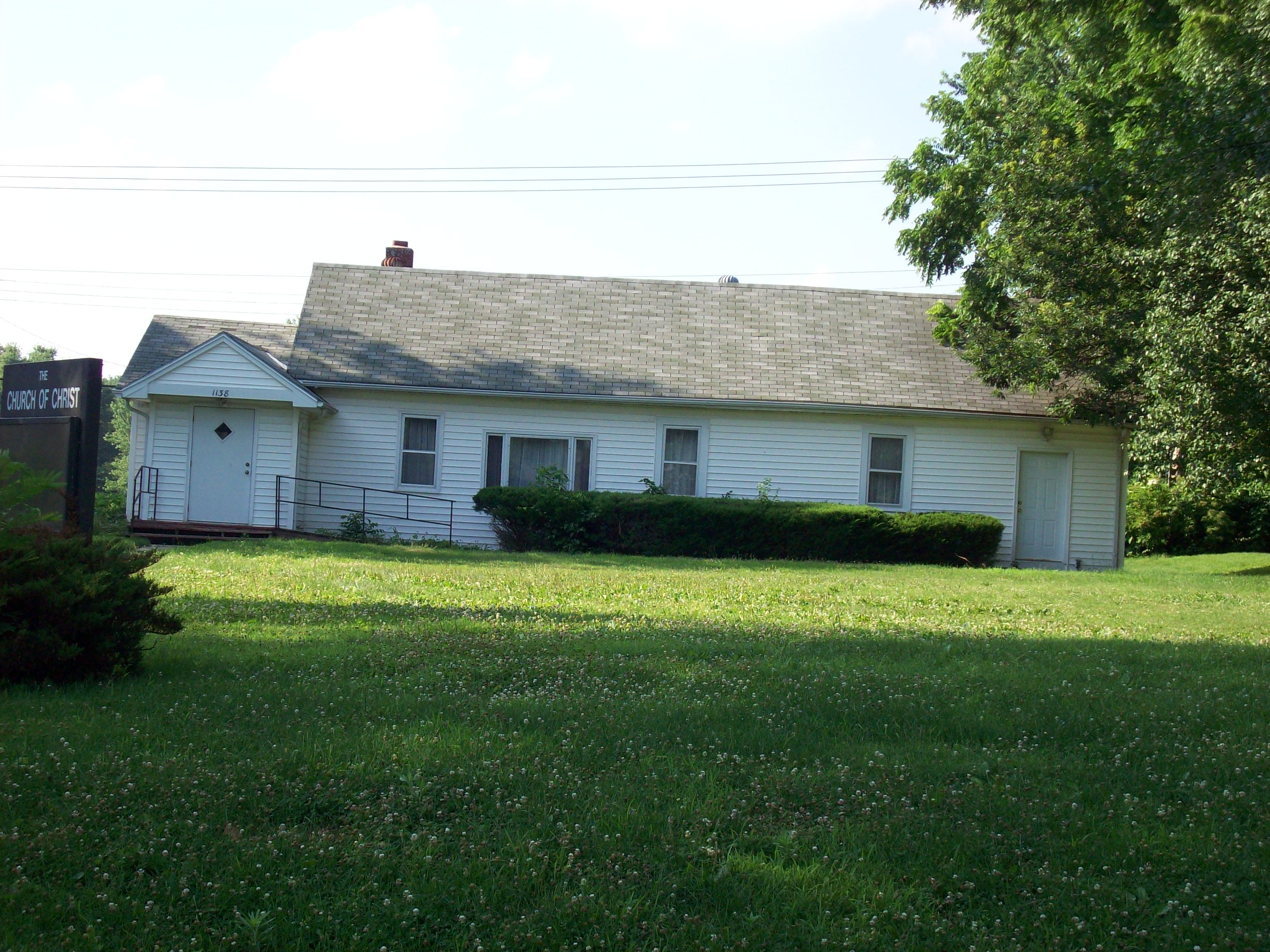
- Fettingite meetinghouse in Independence, Missouri
- Classification: Latter Day Saint movement
- Orientation: Latter Day Saints
- Polity: Church conference
- Moderator: None; all members of the Quorum of Twelve Apostles are equal
- Region: United States
- Founder: Otto Fetting
- Origin: 1929
- Separated from: Church of Christ (Temple Lot) (a.k.a. "Hedrickites")
- Separations: Church of Christ with the Elijah Message; Church of Christ

The Church of Christ, informally referred to as the Fettingites, is a denomination within the Latter Day Saint movement which split from the Church of Christ—informally known as "Hedrickites"— in late 1929. The faction was formally established on April 8, 1930, and an Associated Press report published in The New York Times and Los Angeles Times April 7, 1930, describes it as having been briefly named "The Church of Jesus Christ" and later, the "Church of Christ". It is informally referred to as the "Church of Christ (Fettingite)", after its founder, Otto Fetting, but this sect has never officially been named as such. Otto Fetting, an Apostle in the Church of Christ, was the alleged recipient of a series of messages delivered by John the Baptist concerning construction of a temple on the Temple Lot, along with other aspects of Hedrickite doctrine and practice. The rejection of his "Twelfth Message" by a majority vote of his fellow Apostles in October 1929 led to a split in the Temple Lot organization between those who rejected Fetting's messages and those who accepted them. The "Fettingites" subsequently established their own church organization.

While Fettingite doctrine and practices are virtually identical to those of the Church of Christ, a significant difference exists today in the acceptance of the messages' authenticity between Hedrickites and Fettingites. The Hedrickite leadership voted at their April, 1936 conference to formally reject Otto Fetting's claim of having heard from John the Baptist, but some laity in the Hedrickite sect have informally expressed interest or belief in his claims, to where about a half-dozen Hedrickites today believe Fetting received some or all of the revelations he claimed. After its founder's death in 1933, the Fettingite sect further divided into various factions, including The Church of Christ (Restored), the Church of Christ at Halley's Bluff, and the Church of Christ with the Elijah Message. As with the Church of Christ, each of these groups declares itself to be the "only true and living church upon the face of the whole earth."

== Otto Fetting ==
=== Entry into the Temple Lot church ===
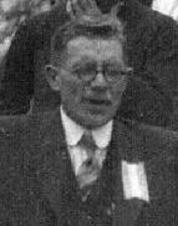
Otto Fetting on April 6, 1929 praying at a groundbreaking ceremony for a proposed Temple.

Otto Fetting was born on 20 November 1871 in Casco, St. Clair County, Michigan. Making his home in Port Huron, Michigan, he was baptised into the Reorganized Church of Jesus Christ of Latter Day Saints on February 9, 1891, and ordained a High Priest on February 15, 1899. In 1925, disgruntled by the Supreme Directional Control controversy within the RLDS church, Fetting switched his allegiance to the Temple Lot organization. At the time, this did not require rebaptism or reordination, as each group accepted the priesthood and sacraments of the other. In the spring of 1926, he was among seven men ordained to be Apostles in the Church of Christ.

=== Visitation by John the Baptist ===
On February 4, 1927, Otto Fetting claimed that he had been visited by a so-called "resurrected angel" clothed in 20th-century garb, who delivered a message for him to give to the Temple Lot organization. In a second alleged visitation one month later, the being identified himself as John the Baptist. The "angel"'s messages advised construction of the long-awaited Temple in Independence, Missouri, first foretold by Latter-Day Saint founder Joseph Smith in 1831 and 1832. The Temple Lot church had a long history of direction via revelation and angel visits and so was originally receptive to these alleged visits of the Biblical prophet, publishing Fetting's messages in their monthly periodical Zion's Advocate." They also began work on the temple with a groundbreaking ceremony held on 6 April 1929. According to Fetting, the Hedrickites were given seven years to complete the structure.

Fetting's "visitor" revealed various architectural details for the building and specifically directed surveyors to move their markers ten feet to the east of where they had originally been placed. The angel also revealed the location of two of Joseph Smith's original marker stones, which Smith had buried 98 years before to indicate the location for his planned temple. He also indicated that the "Articles of Faith and Practice" of the Temple Lot church were correct and should not be changed from their original form. In other occasions, the messenger indicated particular men to be ordained within the organization, including to its Quorum of Twelve Apostles.

=== The twelfth message ===
Although the Temple Lot organization had enthusiastically accepted the first eleven of Fetting's messages, this would not hold true for the twelfth. In verse four of this missive, John the Baptist states that all persons coming into the Church of Christ must be rebaptized, as "the Lord has rejected all creeds and factions of men". While this reflects the practice of the majority of Latter Day Saint denominations (including the Temple Lot church itself, today), it did not reflect the policy of the Temple Lot church at the time, which accepted members during this period from the Reorganized church, certain other Latter Day Saint organizations, and Joseph Smith's pre-1844 church on their original baptisms. This message equally declared Fetting to have been given the same "keys to the priesthood" that were given to Joseph Smith and Oliver Cowdery on May 15, 1829.

Controversy over the meaning and application of Fetting's twelfth message became so great that he was "silenced" in October 1929 by the leading quorum of the Temple Lot church. Fetting was censured for alleged "arrogant" behavior by demanding that the church comply with his twelfth message. Choosing to withdraw rather than continue under such a restriction, Fetting led approximately half of the Church of Christ members (including some of its apostles) to found an organization of his own, which became known as the Church of Christ (Fettingite). Since the Temple Lot organization retained possession of the Temple Lot and its meetinghouse, Fetting's organization met in members' homes for a considerable period prior to building their own worship facilities.

Fetting claimed to have been visited some thirty times by the "messenger" prior to his death on 30 January 1933.

== Subsequent history ==
=== William A. Draves ===
Four years after Fetting's death, a young Fettingite Elder named William A. Draves from Nucla, Colorado claimed that the same messenger who had appeared to Fetting had begun to appear to him as well, starting on October 4, 1937. While initially receptive to these new messages, the leadership of the existing Fettingite faction ultimately rejected all of them, leading to a split in 1943. Draves' adherents formed the Church of Christ with the Elijah Message, which claims to be the sole legitimate continuance of Fetting's original organization. Draves himself claimed a total of ninety messages prior to his death on June 28, 1994; these were combined with Fetting's into a book entitled The Word of the Lord Brought to Mankind by an Angel. The original Fettingite faction continues to publish its own compendium of Fetting's revelations, simply entitled The Word of the Lord, containing only Fetting's thirty messages. This latter group is colloquially known as the "Thirty-message church."

=== A.C. DeWolf and the Saturday Sabbath ===
While the main Fettingite organization in Missouri took some time to completely reject William Draves and his new "messages", branches of this church in Louisiana and Mississippi did not. Under the leadership of A.C. DeWolf, these Fettingites rejected Draves almost immediately, and formed their own church organization, the Church of Christ (Restored). This organization remained separated from the main Fettingite group even after the latter decided against Draves.

During the 1950s, some leaders of the Fettingite church began to advocate keeping the Saturday Sabbath in lieu of Sunday. In 1956, the Fettingite Quorum of Twelve, under Apostle S.T. Bronson, formally instituted this change. The Church of Christ (Restored) refused to sanction this change, and claims that the Church of Christ (Fettingite) is in error for introducing it.

Other than disagreeing as to the proper day for worship, the "Bronsonite" and "DeWolf" organizations remain virtually identical in doctrine and practice. Both of them accept Fetting's ministry and messages, but not Draves'. Each rejects the other, and considers itself the sole true continuation of Otto Fetting's church. Draves' organization, on the other hand, rejects both of these groups, accepting their founder's messages and those of Otto Fetting.

The "Bronsonite" faction of the Fettingite church is said to have about 2000 members, while the Church of Christ (Restored) has approximately 450.

== Doctrine and practices ==
Other than their acceptance of Fetting's thirty "messages", the beliefs and practices of the Fettingite organizations are virtually identical to those of their parent church, the Church of Christ. In common with the Temple Lot church, Fettingites reject the office of President of the Church, being led instead by their Quorum of Twelve Apostles, with all members of that body considered equal. Also, like their Temple Lot cousins, the Fettingites reject the Doctrine and Covenants and the Pearl of Great Price, as well as Joseph Smith's Inspired Version of the Bible, preferring to use only the King James Bible and the Book of Mormon as doctrinal standards. Baptism for the Dead, eternal marriage, polygamy and the eternal progression doctrine are all rejected. Fettingites still believe that a temple will be reared on the Temple Lot, but it will not be like any of the LDS or Community of Christ temples currently in use.

In verse 6 of his twelfth "message", Otto Fetting quoted John the Baptist as allegedly saying that Joseph Smith had indeed been a true prophet, but that he "sinned before God" due to "pride, and the love and praise of men". "Much of his work has been destroyed", wrote Fetting, "but he will be saved as by fire, and will be numbered with the prophets of old". Accordingly, Fettingites respect Joseph Smith as a prophet, but do not necessarily accept all of his teaching. In verse 1 of his first "message", Fetting's heavenly envoy commanded that the "Articles of Faith and Practice" of the Temple Lot organization (of which Fetting was then still an apostle) were to remain unchanged, "because the Lord inspired the men that wrote them".

The Fettingite faction currently headquartered in Independence, sometimes referred to as the "Bronsonite" group, is Sabbatarian. The Church of Christ (Restored), also called the "De Wolf" group, is found mostly in Louisiana and Mississippi and observes Sunday as its day of worship, as does the Elijah Message church.

== See also ==
- Factional breakdown: Followers of Granville Hedrick
