= Church of Christ With the Elijah Message =

Latter Day Saint movement denomination

The Church of Christ with the Elijah Message
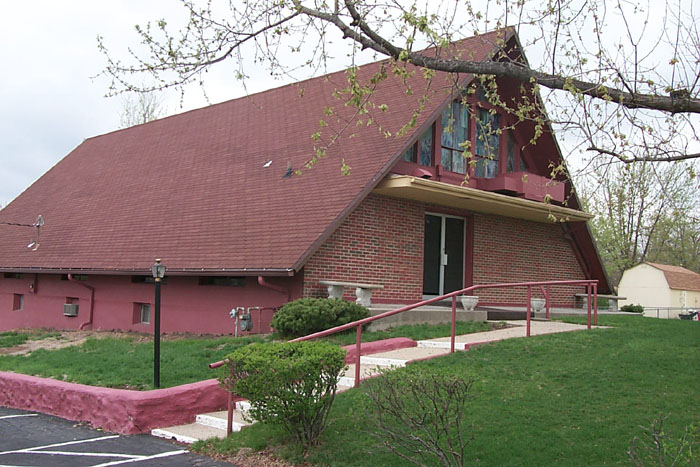
- Church of Christ "With the Elijah Message" meetinghouse in Independence, Missouri
- Classification: Restorationist
- Orientation: Latter Day Saint movement
- Polity: Church conference
- Moderator: None; all members of the Quorum of Twelve Apostles are equal
- Region: United States
- Founder: William Draves
- Origin: 1943
- Separated from: Church of Christ (Fettingite)
- Separations: Church of Christ with the Elijah Message - The Assured Way of the Lord, Inc.;
- Members: c. 12,500 worldwide as of 1987 (This is not accurate information, and the church has most likely suffered steep decline.~2000 members in USA)

The Church of Christ with the Elijah Message is the name of three related church groups and a denomination of the Latter Day Saint movement, headquartered in Independence, Missouri. It split from the Church of Christ (informally referred to as the "Fettingites") in 1943 in a dispute over claimed revelations given to its founder William A. Draves. Draves, an elder in the Fettingite group, claimed to be receiving messages from an angelic being who identified himself as John the Baptist—the same person who had allegedly appeared to Fettingite founder Otto Fetting, a former apostle of the Temple Lot Church of Christ. While many Fettingites accepted these new missives, some did not, leading Draves to form his own church. His adherents claim it to be the sole legitimate continuation of Fetting's organization, as well as that of the Temple Lot church. As of 1987, the church had approximately 12,500 adherents spread between Africa, Europe, Asia, Australia and the Americas.

== Origin of name ==
The church's name originates in the alleged visitations of John the Baptist to Otto Fetting and William Draves. In the Gospel of Matthew 11:14, Jesus Christ identifies John with the prophet Elijah in the Book of Malachi; hence the use of "Elijah Message". Malachi 4:5-6 says: "Behold, I will send you Elijah the prophet before the coming of the great and dreadful day of the Lord. And He shall turn the hearts of the fathers to the children, and the heart of the children to their fathers; lest I come and smite the land with a curse". Members believe that the purported visits of this "messenger" fulfill Malachi's prophecy, as well as others found in Revelation 14:6, Malachi 3:1, Deuteronomy 18:15-19, and Daniel 7:9-10.

== History ==
=== Otto Fetting ===
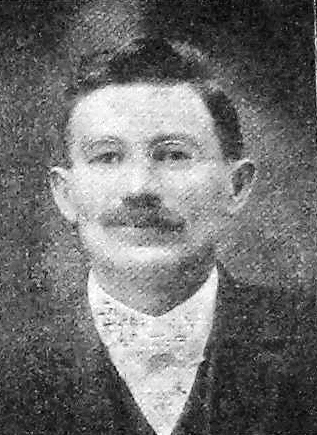
Otto Fetting in 1916

Otto Fetting was born on 20 November 1871 in Casco, St. Clair County, Michigan. Making his home in Port Huron, Michigan, he was baptised into the Reorganized Church of Jesus Christ of Latter Day Saints on February 9, 1891, and ordained to its priesthood in 1899. In 1925, dismayed by the "Supreme Directional Control" controversy within the RLDS church, Fetting switched his allegiance to the Temple Lot Church of Christ (also informally known as "Hedrickites"). At the time, this did not require rebaptism or reordination, as each group accepted the priesthood and sacraments of the other. In the spring of 1926, he was among seven men ordained to be Apostles in the Church of Christ.

On February 4 of 1927, Otto Fetting claimed that he had been visited by John the Baptist, who had delivered a message for him to relay to the Temple Lot organization. This missive directed the construction of the long-awaited Temple in Independence, Missouri, first foretold by Latter Day Saint founder Joseph Smith in 1831. The Temple Lot church had a long history of direction via revelation and angelic visits and thus was originally receptive to these alleged visits of the Biblical prophet, publishing Fetting's messages in their monthly periodical Zion's Advocate. They also began work on the temple with a groundbreaking ceremony held on 6 April 1929. According to Fetting, the Hedrickites were given seven years to complete the structure.

Fetting's messenger revealed various architectural details for the building and specifically directed surveyors to move their markers ten feet to the east of where they had originally been placed. The angel also revealed the location of two of Joseph Smith's original marker stones, which Smith had buried 98 years before to indicate the location for his planned temple. Another revelation indicated that the "Articles of Faith and Practice" of the Temple Lot church were correct, and should not be changed from their original form. On other occasions, the messenger indicated particular men to be ordained within the organization, including to its Quorum of Twelve Apostles.

=== Trouble on the Temple Lot ===
Although the Temple Lot organization had enthusiastically accepted the first eleven of Fetting's messages, this would not hold true for the twelfth. In verse four of this missive, John the Baptist states that all persons coming into the Church of Christ must be rebaptized, as "the Lord has rejected all creeds and factions of men". While this reflects the practice of the majority of Latter Day Saint denominations (including the Temple Lot church itself, today), it did not reflect the policy of the Temple Lot church at the time, which accepted members during this period from the Reorganized church, certain other Latter Day Saint organizations, and Joseph Smith's pre-1844 church on their original baptisms. This message equally declared Fetting to have been given the same "keys to the priesthood" that were given to Joseph Smith and Oliver Cowdery on May 15, 1829.

Controversy over the meaning and application of Fetting's twelfth message became so great that Fetting himself was "silenced" in October 1929 by the Temple Lot organization. Choosing to withdraw rather than continue under such a restriction, Fetting led approximately half of the Church of Christ members (including some of its apostles) to found a "Church of Christ" of his own, which became known as the Church of Christ (Fettingite). Since the main Temple Lot organization retained possession of the Temple Lot and its meetinghouse, Fetting's organization met in members' homes for a considerable period prior to building their own worship facilities.

Fetting would claim to be visited a total of 30 times by the messenger prior to his death on 30 January 1933.

=== William A. Draves ===
William A. Draves

Four years after Fetting's death, a young Fettingite elder named William A. Draves from Nucla, Colorado claimed that the same messenger who had appeared to Fetting had begun to appear to him, as well. While the Fettingite organization was initially receptive to these new missives, it ultimately decided to reject them all, leading to a split in the Fettingite organization in 1943. Draves' adherents formed the Church of Christ with the Elijah Message, which claims to be the sole legitimate continuance of Fetting's original organization. Draves himself announced a total of 90 messages prior to his death in 1994, which were combined with Fetting's into a book entitled The Word of the Lord Brought to Mankind by an Angel. Fetting's organization publishes its own compendium, simply entitled The Word of the Lord, which contains only Fetting's original 30 messages.

Prior to W.A. Draves's death in 1994 the final three messages he had recorded reflected leadership disputes within The Church of Christ with the Elijah Message. These led to a division causing Apostles W.A. Draves, Leonard Draves and Mervyn Johnson to be blocked from church property by way of a restraining order. After a short legal battle, a failure to reconcile, and the death of W.A. Draves, six of the twelve leading Apostles decided to reincorporate the Church under the name The Church of Christ with the Elijah Message, Inc. in August 1994. This new organization would go on to become the Church of Christ With the Elijah Message, The Assured Way of the Lord, Inc. The remaining five Apostles, including those who filed the above restraining order, retained the corporate name "The Church of Christ with the Elijah Message, Established Anew 1929" and all properties including the headquarters building at 608 Lacy Rd. Independence, Missouri.

== Doctrine and practices ==
Other than their acceptance of Fetting's 30 messages and the 90 offered by William Draves, the beliefs and practices of the Elijah Message organization are virtually identical to those of the Church of Christ (Temple Lot). In common with the Temple Lot church, the Elijah Message church rejects the office of President of the Church, being led instead by their Quorum of Twelve Apostles; all members of that quorum are considered equal.

Also, like their Temple Lot cousins, the church rejects the Doctrine and Covenants and the Pearl of Great Price, as well as Joseph Smith's Inspired Version of the Bible, preferring to use only the King James Bible and the Record of the Nephites (their name for the Book of Mormon) as standards. They also await an as-yet-unrevealed work of scripture which the Messenger was alleged to have shown to Draves in 1946. Baptism for the Dead, eternal marriage, polygamy and the eternal progression doctrine are all rejected. Members of the Church of Christ with the Elijah Message still believe that a temple will be reared on the Temple Lot, but it will not be like any of the LDS or Community of Christ temples currently in use.

In verse 6 of his twelfth message, Otto Fetting quoted John the Baptist as saying that Joseph Smith had indeed been a true prophet, but that he "sinned before God" due to "pride, and the love and praise of men". "Much of his work has been destroyed", wrote Fetting, "but he will be saved as by fire, and will be numbered with the prophets of old". Accordingly, the Elijah Message church respects Joseph Smith as a prophet but does not necessarily accept all of his teachings. In verse 1 of his first message, Fetting's heavenly envoy commanded that the "Articles of Faith and Practice" of the Temple Lot organization (of which Fetting was then still an apostle) were to remain unchanged, "because the Lord inspired the men that wrote them". Hence, these remain the same in the Elijah Message organization, as well as within all Fettingite sects.

== See also ==
- Factional breakdown: Followers of Granville Hedrick
