= The Word of the Lord =

Part of the scriptural canon of the LDS movement

The Word of the Lord refers to one of two books which are part of the scriptural canon for some denominations in the Latter Day Saint movement. The first book, simply entitled The Word of the Lord, is used by members of the Church of Christ (Fettingite), the Church of Christ at Halley's Bluff and the Church of Christ (Restored). The second, called The Word of the Lord Brought to Mankind by an Angel, is accepted only by the Church of Christ with the Elijah Message, and churches derived from it, such as the Church of Christ (Assured Way). Both of these texts contain revelations allegedly given to former Church of Christ (Temple Lot) Apostle Otto Fetting by an angelic being who claimed to be John the Baptist. The latter title also contains revelations purportedly given to William A. Draves by this same being, after Fetting's death.

== Background ==
=== Otto Fetting ===
The Word of the Lord originated in the claimed angelic visitations of John the Baptist to Otto Fetting, an Apostle in the Church of Christ (Temple Lot) who lived in Port Huron, Michigan. These visits commenced in February 1927, and ended with Fetting's death in January 1933. Directives were given to build the long-awaited temple in Independence, Missouri, together with instructions about its dimensions and Temple Lot doctrine and practices. While the first eleven of these messages were enthusiastically accepted by the Temple Lot organization, the twelfth message caused considerable controversy. Mandating rebaptism for those who had come into the Church of Christ from other Latter Day Saint denominations (contrary to Temple Lot practice at that time), this message was rejected by the leadership of that organization during a church conference October 6–7, 1929, and Fetting was "silenced". Unwilling to continue under such a restriction, Fetting left the Temple Lot church and founded his own organization, the Church of Christ (Fettingite). The Temple Lot organization retained possession of the Temple Lot and other church properties.

=== William Draves ===
Four years after Fetting's death in 1933, a young Fettingite elder named William Draves claimed that the "messenger" had come to him, with further revelations for the Fettingite organization. While many Fettingites accepted Draves' claims, some did not, and this led to a split in Fetting's church in 1939. Those who accepted Draves formed the Church of Christ With the Elijah Message, while those who rejected him remained in the original Fettingite organization; it subsequently split during the 1950s over the introduction of Seventh-day Sabbatarianism. This separation between Draves' organization and the Fettingite remnant continues, with each group proclaiming itself the true continuation of Fetting's work.

William Draves was ordained an apostle in his new organization, and continued to receive alleged visitations from John the Baptist until his death in 1994.

=== Testimonies about the Messenger ===
Otto Fetting emphasized the ability to physically feel the touch of this alleged angel, indicating in his 1929 testimonial that he "felt his hand on my head, and the slap on my shoulder". Draves, too, indicated that he could feel the visitor's touch on his shoulder, and felt him hold his hand. In addition to the testimonies of the two "scribes" (Fetting and Draves), the book contains an additional testimony of four witnesses who saw the angel during his final visit to Fetting in 1933. This latter testimony is signed and notarized.

In the preface to his first message, and in his 1940 personal testimony about the heavenly "messenger", William Draves wrote the following:

"The messenger wears a white robe, his hair is a tiny bit gold next to his skin and blended to whiteness like pure wool, white as snow. His eyes are like a flame and his feet like the brightness of fine brass, as if they were ablaze. His voice has the sound of one having authority. His countenance is as the brightness of the sun with its greatness in light, even brighter than light that shineth down on the earth. He is enveloped in light and immediately around him is very bright".

Because the messenger could be seen and touched, some in Draves' church have expressed a belief that the messages in the Word of the Lord are not revelations, since for a revelation (according to them), the author is unseen.

== The books ==
=== Overview ===
Both the Fettingite and Elijah Message editions of The World of the Lord are divided into sections of varying lengths, called "messages". In each message, John the Baptist speaks in the first person, claiming to fulfill prophecies given in Malachi 3:1 and Malachi 4:5-6, where "Elijah the prophet" is promised before the coming of the "great and dreadful day of the Lord". This latter verse is also referred to by Jesus Christ in Matthew 11:17, where the relationship between Elijah and John is clarified. The Messenger—as he is called by Fetting and Draves—also claims to be fulfilling Deuteronomy 18:15-19's prophecy of a prophet like Moses, and to be the angel "flying in the midst of heaven" mentioned in Revelation 14:6. He claims to be purifying the Levites in preparation for the Lord's return.

The Word of the Lord covers a wide array of topics, containing encouraging words, warnings of dark events (but also of a bright future, ultimately), appointments to church office, visions, and several prophecies. The early portion of the Word of the Lord (common to both editions) contains detailed descriptions of architecture for the temple which is to be built on the Temple Lot in Independence, Missouri. This temple is described in the Articles of Faith and Practice for the church, which quotes from the original prophecy on this subject made by Joseph Smith, Jr., founder of the Latter Day Saint movement.

=== Fettingite editions ===
Editions of The Word of the Lord utilized within those Fettingite organizations who rejected William Draves all contain only the thirty "messages" given to Otto Fetting. At least two of these organizations are extant today, and at least one still publishes an edition of this work.

=== Elijah Message edition ===
The Word of the Lord Brought to Mankind by an Angel is subtitled, "A warning to all people on the second coming of Jesus Christ, revelations on the building of the temple, and instructions to the Church of Christ: The Lord has spoken and revealed his purpose by the mouth of his servant John the Baptist".

The book is divided into 131 sections, on 3 levels, all with a view: the thirty messages originally given to Fetting, and ninety more allegedly given to William Draves. Some of its revelations include a description of the course and end of World War II written in 1939. Describing the end of the war, Draves writes: "I saw that Germany was no more; she had become divided, part of her going to America and part joining with the armies of the man at Rome. Great Britain was also broken up never again to be united as an empire." However, Draves prophesied that the war would last seven years, and although it ended as described here, it only lasted six. The "man at Rome" is a cryptic character.

Another message, first published in 1968, contains the prophecy: "The great powers, not of God's will, will find their failing and end. This will consummate in 1989." Church members believe this alludes to the end of the Cold War. This same message states that 'Armageddon' would begin in "the nineties" (1990s). Some believe this may refer to Iraq's invasion of Kuwait on August 2, 1990, and the ensuing chain of events.
