= Church of Christ (Temple Lot) =

Latter Day Saint movement denomination

- The Church of Christ, built in 1990
- Classification: Latter Day Saint movement
- Orientation: Latter Day Saints
- Theology: Trinitarian; Mormonism
- Polity: Quorum of the Twelve
- Moderator: None; all members of the Quorum of the Twelve are seen as equal
- Region: World
- Founder: Granville Hedrick, John E. Page and others
- Origin: April 6, 1830 (officially given); Winter, 1852 (establishment as separate organization)
- Separated from: Claims to be the sole legitimate continuation of the Church of Christ (Latter Day Saints)
- Separations: Church of Christ (Fettingite), Church of Christ (Hancock), others
- Congregations: 32
- Members: 7,310
- Official website: https://www.churchofchrist1830.org/

The Church of Christ, informally called Hedrickites and the Church of Christ (Temple Lot), is a denomination of the Latter Day Saint movement headquartered in Independence, Missouri, on a parcel of land known as the Temple Lot. The nickname for members of the church comes from the surname of Granville Hedrick, who was ordained as the church's leader in July 1863.

Unlike the Church of Jesus Christ of Latter-day Saints (LDS Church) and Community of Christ (the two largest Latter Day Saint denominations), the Temple Lot church rejects the office of prophet or president, being instead led by its Quorum of Twelve Apostles. The church also rejects the doctrines of baptism for the dead and celestial marriage promulgated by the Utah-based LDS Church, as well as the Doctrine and Covenants and Pearl of Great Price. While once avidly engaged in dialogue with other Latter Day Saint factions, the church no longer has any official contact with any other organization. The denomination is also notable for its sole ownership of the Temple Lot, which it has held for nearly 150 years. As of 2013, membership is 7,310 members in 12 countries. Most of the members live in the United States, but there are parishes in Canada, Mexico, Honduras, Nigeria, Kenya, Democratic Republic of the Congo, Malawi, Tanzania, India, Ethiopia, and the Philippines.

== History ==
=== Origins ===
The Temple Lot church shares its early history with the larger Latter-Day Saint denominations, including the LDS Church and the Community of Christ (formerly the RLDS Church). After the death of Joseph Smith, the Latter Day Saint movement's founder, on June 27, 1844, several leaders vied for control and established rival organizations. By the 1860s, five early Mormon branches found themselves unaffiliated with any larger group. Located in Bloomington, Illinois; Crow Creek, Illinois; Half Moon Prairie, Illinois; Eagle Creek, Illinois; and Vermillion, Indiana, these branches united under the leadership of Granville Hedrick in May 1863. On July 18, 1863, Hedrick was ordained as "President, Prophet, Seer and Revelator". Participating in Hedrick's ordination was John E. Page who had been an apostle under Smith. The Temple Lot church affirms a founding date of April 6, 1830, in Fayette, New York, and claims to be the sole legitimate continuance of Smith's original Church of Christ. Hedrick later distanced himself from the title of "President", as he ultimately came to believe that this was an unscriptural office.

At the time of its commencement in 1863, Hedrick retained the name of "The Church of Jesus Christ of Latter Day Saints" for his organization, reflecting his insistence that it was a continuation of Smith's church, which had adopted that name in 1838. This was soon shortened to "Church of Christ", however, as this had been the name under which Smith originally incorporated the church in 1830. Hedrick also wished to distinguish his church from the LDS Church in Utah. The parenthetical "(Temple Lot)", while not part of the legal name of the church, is usually appended to the name to distinguish the church from the many other Latter Day Saint and non–Latter Day Saint churches that use the name "Church of Christ".

=== Temple Lot ===
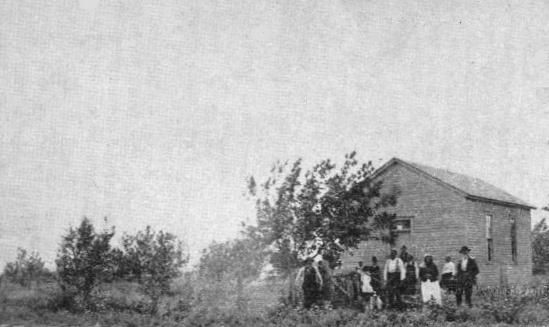
First Hedrickite meetinghouse on the Temple Lot

The church currently occupies a property in Independence, Missouri, known as the Temple Lot. This grassy, 2-acre (8,100 m^{2}) plot is considered by Latter-day Saints of nearly all persuasions to be the site designated by Joseph Smith for the temple of the New Jerusalem, a sacred city to be built preparatory to the Second Coming of Jesus Christ. The Hedrickites returned to Independence in 1867 to purchase the designated lot for this temple, and the church has been headquartered there ever since. In 1891, the church was sued by the RLDS Church for title to the Temple Lot. The RLDS Church won at trial, but this decision was reversed on appeal. In the 1930s, the Temple Lot church excavated the site in an attempt to build a temple, but their efforts stalled because of the Great Depression and internal disputes, and the excavation was filled in 1946. The lot was re-landscaped, and is today occupied only by the church's headquarters and a few trees in its northeast corner. No further plans to erect such an edifice have been announced.

=== Church burnings ===
In July 1898, William D. C. Pattison, a suspended member of the LDS Church from Boston, Massachusetts, was arrested and briefly detained after attempting to remove a fence placed around the Temple Lot. Early on September 5, 1898, he set fire to the tiny headquarters building, and then walked to the police station and turned himself in. After he testified in court appearances in November 1898, Pattison was found guilty but insane and sentenced to a stay in a mental institution. The building was reconstructed in 1905.

The 1990 building from the side

On January 1, 1990, Jordan Smith, a former member of the Church of Christ who had recently joined the LDS Church set fire to the unoccupied church building on the Temple Lot, claiming that his actions were part of a political protest and a prophecy that war was coming to America. The fire caused significant damage to the second story of the building, although the first floor containing church records and documents remained intact. On February 1, 1990, the remainder of the building was razed. Construction of a new headquarters building began in August 1990. The man was convicted by a jury of second-degree arson and breaking and entering on January 16, 1991.

=== Divisions ===
In 1929, the Temple Lot church split between adherents and opponents of a series of "messages" allegedly given by John the Baptist to Otto Fetting, an apostle of the church. While the first eleven of these missives were accepted by the Temple Lot membership, the twelfth was rejected, leading Fetting to withdraw with a portion of the membership and found The Church of Christ (Fettingite). The Temple Lot organization retained the church name and properties, including the Temple Lot.

Fetting's organization later divided after his death into three factions: the first followed the teachings of apostle S. T. Bronson and accepted a Saturday Sabbath; the second rejected Bronson's teachings while remaining faithful to Fetting's. The third faction was composed of adherents of William A. Draves, who claimed that the "Messenger" was appearing to him after Fetting's death. Draves's adherents would form the Church of Christ with the Elijah Message, which later gave birth to other sects.

Another sect breaking with the Temple Lot church was the Church of Christ (Hancock), founded in 1946 by Pauline Hancock, who had resigned from the Temple Lot church due to her disagreements with that organization over its teachings on the Godhead. This church initially accepted only the King James Bible and Book of Mormon as scripture, though it rejected the latter in 1973 and formally dissolved itself in 1984. Hancock was the first woman to found and lead a church in the Latter Day Saint movement.

Although all of these sects (with the exception of the last) have similar core beliefs— reflected in their use of the same "Articles of Faith and Practice"—none of them recognizes the others as legitimate.

== Doctrines ==
=== Church leadership ===
Although the Temple Lot church accepts the veracity of Joseph Smith as a prophet of God, it does not necessarily accept everything that Smith taught or claimed to be revelation. One distinct difference between it and other Latter Day Saint churches lies in its rejection of the office of President of the Church. Instead of a president–prophet, the Church of Christ is led by its Quorum of Twelve Apostles, with all members of that body being considered equal in precedence and authority. Members of the Temple Lot church believe that Smith was wrong to assume the office of church president, an office they deem to not have been provided for in either the Bible or the Book of Mormon, their two scriptural standards. Although Granville Hedrick was ordained to be president of his church in 1863, he later repudiated this ordination, even referring to Smith as a "fallen prophet".

Like the LDS Church, but unlike the Community of Christ, the Temple Lot church limits its priesthood offices to men.

=== Authority ===
The Church of Christ assumes its authority from Joseph Smith and Oliver Cowdery's account of May 15, 1829, when John the Baptist came to them and ordained them to the Priesthood of Aaron, "which holds the keys of the ministering of angels, and of the gospel of repentance, and of baptism by immersion for the remission of sins; and this shall never be taken again from the earth until the sons of Levi do offer again an offering unto the Lord in righteousness". John said that he came to them on behalf of the ancient apostles Peter, James, and John. In Smith's account, he and Cowdery were baptized and were given the keys of the Aaronic priesthood, which included the authority to baptize. The messenger told them that the priesthood they were ordained to did not hold the keys of conferring the gift of the Holy Ghost, but that that authority would be conferred upon them later. Smith and Cowdery reported that Peter, James, and John visited them later that same year and bestowed upon them the higher Melchizedek priesthood.

=== The only true church ===
The Church of Christ teaches that it is the only true church in the modern world. As published on the official church website: "There is no other authority to represent the Kingdom of God on the earth in modern times, nor had there been in the churches for 1260 years prior to 1830".

=== Scriptures ===
The Church of Christ rejects the Doctrine and Covenants and the Pearl of Great Price, as well as Joseph Smith's "Inspired Version" of the Bible, preferring to use only the King James Bible and the Book of Mormon as doctrinal standards. The Book of Commandments is accepted as being superior to the Doctrine and Covenants as a compendium of Smith's early revelations (due to changes effected in many Doctrine and Covenants sections that had earlier been printed in the Book of Commandments), but is not accorded the same status as the Bible or Book of Mormon. The Temple Lot church publishes its own edition of the Book of Mormon, identical in chaptering and versification to versions printed by the Community of Christ. "The Word of the Lord", used by the Fettingite and Elijah Message organizations, which broke off from the Temple Lot church, is rejected; however, the Temple Lot church maintains an openness to the idea that revelation might conceivably come to any member of the church at any time, whether male or female, ordained to the priesthood or not.

=== Other doctrinal distinctions ===
Baptism for the dead, celestial marriage, plural marriage, and exaltation doctrines are all rejected by the Temple Lot church. The offices of high priest and patriarch are also rejected as being "doctrinal innovations" not sanctioned in the Bible, Book of Mormon, or Book of Commandments.

=== Temples ===
Temple Lot church members still believe that a temple will be reared on the Temple Lot, but it will not be like any of the LDS Church or Community of Christ temples currently in use. Rather, it has been generally described by the Temple Lot organization as a place for Jesus to show himself and "endow his servants whom he chooses with power to preach the gospel in all the world to every kindred, tongue, and people, that the promise of God to Israel may be fulfilled". The church does not accept the legitimacy of the Community of Christ's Independence Temple, located across the street from the Temple Lot, nor of any of the over 200 temples constructed by the LDS Church.

=== David Whitmer ===
Doctrines of the Church of Christ are heavily influenced by the writings of David Whitmer, a leading figure of early Mormonism who was expelled from Smith's church in 1838. In 1887, Whitmer published a pamphlet deeply critical of Sidney Rigdon and Smith. This pamphlet, entitled "An Address to all Believers in Christ", is widely read and promoted among members of the Church of Christ today, and is on sale in the lobby of its headquarters building. In it, Whitmer repeatedly claims that Smith had "fallen"—or began to "fall"—from his divine calling almost as soon as the church was established in 1830, or perhaps even before then. Whitmer's reasoning includes his charge that Smith was to have "pretended to no other gift" except the translation of the Book of Mormon, and was never to be more than a "first elder" among "fellow elders" in the fledgling church.
