= Priesthood (Latter Day Saints) =

Authority in the Latter Day Saint movement

In the Latter Day Saint movement, priesthood is the power and authority of God given to humans, including the authority to perform ordinances and to perform as a leader in the church. A group of priesthood holders is referred to as a quorum.

Priesthood denotes elements of both power and authority. The priesthood includes the power Jesus gave the Twelve apostles to perform miracles such as the casting out of devils and the healing of the sick (Luke 9:1). Latter Day Saints believe that the biblical miracles performed by prophets and apostles were done by the power of the priesthood, including the miracles of Jesus, who holds all of the keys of the priesthood. The priesthood is formally known as the "Priesthood after the Order of the Son of God", but to avoid the frequent use of the name of a deity, it is referred to as the Melchizedek priesthood (Melchizedek being the high priest to whom Abraham paid tithes).

As an authority, the priesthood is the authority by which a bearer may perform ecclesiastical acts of service in the name of God. Latter Day Saints believe that acts (and in particular, ordinances performed by one with priesthood authority) are recognized by God and are binding in heaven, on earth, and in the afterlife. In addition, Latter Day Saints believe that the authority of the priesthood legitimizes leadership positions within the church. The Church of Jesus Christ of Latter-day Saints (LDS Church), the largest denomination in the movement, restricts its priesthood to men, as do most of the other Latter Day Saint denominations. An exception is the Community of Christ, the second-largest denomination of the movement, which began ordaining women to all its priesthood offices in 1984.

== Orders of priesthood ==
Latter Day Saint theology has recognized at least three orders of priesthood: the Aaronic priesthood, the Melchizedek priesthood, and the Patriarchal priesthood. Although these are different orders, they are, in reality, all subsumed under the priesthood held by Jesus (i.e., that is, the Melchizedek priesthood).

The Aaronic priesthood (also called the Levitical priesthood), is considered to be a lesser priesthood tracing its roots to Aaron, the brother of Moses, through John the Baptist. In Latter Day Saint theology, it derives from the original holy priesthood which Joseph Smith and Oliver Cowdery received on May 15, 1829, when they were ordained by an angel identifying himself as John the Baptist. In 1835, Smith and Cowdery clarified that this authority was the "Aaronic, or Levitical priesthood".

By early 1831, Latter Day Saint theology also recognized a higher order of priesthood, or the high priesthood. This high priesthood had been foreshadowed in the Book of Mormon, which referred to men holding the unique position of high priest in the church organization described in that book, holding the "high priesthood of the holy order of God" (Alma 4:20, Alma 13:8); however, the office of high priest was not implemented in early Mormonism until some days after Smith was joined in his ministry by Sidney Rigdon, a newly-converted Campbellite minister from Ohio, who merged his congregation with Smith's Church of Christ. Rigdon believed the teachings of the early Latter Day Saint missionaries who taught him, but thought the missionaries were lacking in heavenly power. In response to Rigdon's concern, the church's first high priests were ordained at a special conference held in June 1831.

By 1835, Latter Day Saints began referring to this high priesthood as the Melchizedek priesthood, or, the "Holy Priesthood, after the Order of the Son of God". This priesthood was so named, according to a revelation, because Melchizedek "was such a great high priest" and "out of respect or reverence to the name of the Supreme Being, to avoid the too frequent repetition of his name". This priesthood was thought to be the order of priesthood held by Jesus, and a distinction was made between the Aaronic and Melchizedek priesthoods, which derives in part from the Epistle to the Hebrews, whose author argues that Jesus arose "after the order of Melchizedec, and not ... after the order of Aaron" (Hebrews 7:11).

Although it was generally considered that there were only two orders of priesthood during most of Smith's life, about a year before his death, on August 27, 1843, he referred to a third order of priesthood, the Patriarchal priesthood. This one of the "3 grand orders of priesthood", Smith said, was second in greatness between the lower Aaronic and the higher Melchizedek. The priesthood included, according to Smith, the "keys to endowment—tokens, etc.", the ability to "walk with God", and the authority of the "order of prayer". Smith taught that this order of priesthood was passed from father to son, and held by Abraham and the biblical patriarchs. However, Smith provided little further information about this third order. Although Smith instituted an office of patriarch in the church, most modern Latter Day Saint denominations classify the Patriarchal priesthood as an office within the Melchizedek priesthood, rather than a separate order.

== Calling and ordination ==
According to Latter Day Saint doctrine, to exercise priesthood authority, a person must (1) be called by God, (2) be ordained or endowed with priesthood authority, and (3) receive the necessary priesthood keys, either through ordination to an office of the priesthood or through delegation or setting apart by someone who does hold the appropriate keys.

=== Calling to the priesthood ===
Latter Day Saints believe that as a prerequisite to receiving the priesthood, a person must be "called" to the priesthood. When a person is called, it is the person's opportunity or destiny to hold the priesthood. See Matthew 22:14 ("Many are called but few are chosen"). There is some disagreement among the various Latter Day Saint sects as to the manner by which a person may be called to the priesthood; however, there are at least four possibilities expressed in scripture used by the movement: (1) calling by prophecy, (2) calling through lineage, (3) calling by foreordination, or (4) calling through faith and good works. In addition, a person's calling through lineage or foreordination may be revealed by prophecy, and a person's faith and good works may identify him as one who was foreordained; thus, these categories are not mutually exclusive.

==== Calling by prophecy ====
Despite the existence in Latter Day Saint doctrine of other means by which a person could be called to the priesthood, the most common and standard means by which a person is said to have been called to the priesthood is "by prophecy". In his Wentworth letter, Smith stated, "We believe that a man must be called of God, by prophecy, and by the laying on of hands, by one who is in authority... to preach the Gospel and administer in the ordinances thereof." (See also Fifth Article of Faith.)

In the early church, many callings came as direct scriptural revelations by Smith. Since Smith's death, most Latter Day Saint denominations consider a person to have been called by prophecy when someone within the church hierarchy, who holds the priesthood, is inspired by the Holy Spirit to confer the priesthood.

==== Right to the priesthood through lineage ====
In some situations, Latter Day Saints believe that a person may also be called through their lineage, so that they have a legal right to a priesthood office by lineal succession. For example, a revelation given to Smith states, "And if they be literal descendants of Aaron, they have a legal right to the bishopric, if they are the firstborn among the sons of Aaron." In a revelation to Smith, he was promised his lineage would have the priesthood: "Therefore, thus saith the Lord unto you, with whom the priesthood hath continued through the lineage of your fathers—For ye are lawful heirs, according to the flesh, and have been hid from the world with Christ in God—Therefore your life and the priesthood have remained, and must needs remain through you and your lineage until the restoration of all things spoken by the mouths of all the holy prophets since the world began." In addition, Smith taught that the Patriarchal priesthood descended from father to son. One who has the right and calling to hold these positions through lineage must still be ordained by the church hierarchy before officiating in the office.

==== Calling by foreordination ====
Latter Day Saints also believe that a person may be called to the priesthood by foreordination. The Book of Mormon refers to priests that were "called and prepared from the foundation of the world according to the foreknowledge of God, on account of their exceeding faith and good works." (Alma 13:3). In the Book of Abraham, Abraham was said to be called to the priesthood in this way:

Now the Lord had shown unto me, Abraham, the intelligences that were organized before the world was; and among all these there were many of the noble and great ones; And God saw these souls that they were good, and he stood in the midst of them, and he said: These I will make my rulers; for he stood among those that were spirits, and he saw that they were good; and he said unto me: Abraham, thou art one of them; thou wast chosen before thou wast born.

It is generally believed that those who were foreordained to the priesthood earned this right by valiancy or nobility in the pre-mortal life. It is by prophecy that a person's foreordination is thought to be revealed. Latter Day Saints, however, do not believe in predestination, and therefore believe that foreordination is a destiny, but not an immutable destiny. A person can nullify their foreordination through sin.

==== Calling by faith and good works ====
Many Latter Day Saints believe that a person may be called to the priesthood through their faith and good works. This view is based primarily upon the Book of Mormon, which states that "it was by faith that they of old were called after the holy order of God". (Ether 12:10). Similarly, in the Book of Mormon's first detailed discussion concerning the calling and ordination of high priests, the scripture states, "And this is the manner after which they were ordained— ... they having chosen good, and exercising exceedingly great faith, are called with a holy calling .... And thus they have been called to this holy calling on account of their faith." (Alma 13:3-4). In a similar vein, the earliest sections of the Doctrine and Covenants contain statements such as "if ye have desires to serve God ye are called to the work" and "whosoever will thrust in his sickle and reap, the same is called of God".

=== The gift of the priesthood and ordination to a particular priesthood office ===
In addition to being called by God, Latter Day Saint theology holds that a person must be given priesthood authority by one who currently holds it. While calling represents a general call to receive priesthood authority, a person is not thought to actually possess the priesthood to which they have been called until it is formally conferred or endowed to that person through a sacred ceremony.

Latter Day Saints generally understand priesthood authority to be given in one of two ways: (1) as part of a priesthood ordination ceremony, or (2) through the endowment ceremony. After a person has received the priesthood, they may be ordained numerous times to various particular offices within the church. Receiving the priesthood is considered to be a saving ordinance.

==== Requirement of priesthood succession ====
Very early in his ministry, Joseph Smith began to advocate the position that the priesthood does not come directly from God through the Holy Spirit, as many Protestants believe, but through a line of apostolic succession. Thus, Latter Day Saints generally believe that the priesthood originates with Jesus and is passed down through a line of succession. Only one who holds the priesthood can pass it to another. Thus, in 1829, Smith and his associate stated that the Aaronic priesthood was given to him by John the Baptist, who was thought to have authority through the lineage of his father Zacharias, who was an Aaronic priest. Later, Smith also stated he had received the Melchizedek priesthood from the apostles Peter, James, and John, who were given their authority by Jesus.

==== Gift of the priesthood through an ordination ceremony ====
The most common and well-recognized manner through which a Latter Day Saint receives the priesthood is as part of a priesthood ordination ceremony. Typically, in an ordination ceremony, before a person is ordained for the first time to a particular office such as elder, deacon, teacher, or priest, the person performing the ceremony will lay their hands upon the recipient's head and in the name of Jesus Christ and by the authority of his priesthood confer upon the recipient the Aaronic or Melchizedek priesthood.

==== Gift of the priesthood through the endowment ceremony ====
While most Latter Day Saints recognize that the priesthood may be conferred as part of an ordination ceremony, some feminist Latter Day Saints view the endowment ceremony as an endowment of priesthood authority. In the washing and anointing portion of the endowment, men are washed and anointed (by men) "to become kings and priests", while women are washed and anointed (by women) "to become queens and priestesses". Later in the ceremony, both men and women are clothed in the "robes of the priesthood" and "prepared to officiate in the ordinances of" the Aaronic and Melchizedek priesthoods.

Thus, it has been suggested that the endowment ceremony was recognized as an endowment of priesthood authority to both men and women, although not an ordination to a specific priesthood office. This view was expressed in 1884 by Eliza R. Snow, president of the Relief Society, who stated:

Is it necessary for sisters to be set apart to officiate in the sacred ordinances of washing, anointing, and laying on of hands in administering to the sick? It certainly is not. Any and all sisters who honor their holy endowments, not only have right, but should feel it a duty, whenever called upon to administer to our sisters in these ordinances, which God has graciously committed to His daughters as well as to His sons; and we testify that when administered and received in faith and humility they are accompanied with almighty power.

A similar view was also expressed by LDS Church apostle James E. Talmage in 1912, who wrote:

It is a precept of the Church that women of the Church share the authority of the Priesthood with their husbands, actual or prospective; and therefore women ... taking the endowment ... are not ordained to specific rank in the Priesthood. Nevertheless there is no grade, rank, or phase of the temple endowment to which women are not eligible on an equality with men.

Female priesthood authority was closely associated with the Relief Society. Joseph F. Smith, an LDS Church apostle, argued that though women were not ordained as general authorities, elders, or high priests, they are admitted to an "ecclesiastical or priestly authority" through the Relief Society, which may include holding offices within the church through that organization.

==== Ordination to particular priesthood offices in the church through the laying on of hands ====
After a person has received the priesthood, they may be ordained numerous times to various particular offices within the church. This takes place by the laying on of hands. The ordination to a particular office, such as priest, teacher, or elder, represents a more specific call to perform a particular priesthood duty within the church, and a person may be ordained to numerous offices during their lifetime, depending on the needs of the church.

The specific ordination to preach or perform ordinances is made through the laying on of hands, a concept formulated early in Joseph Smith's ministry. He stated the principle as one of the church's articles of faith, that a calling to preach or perform rituals in the name of Christ was to be made through "prophecy and the laying on of hands by those who are in authority" (see Fifth Article of Faith in The Wentworth Letter). A Book of Mormon example of ordination by the laying on of hands is found in the Book of Alma, where Alma "ordained priests and elders, by laying on his hands according to the order of God, to preside and watch over the church". Modern-day priesthood holders ordained to the office of priest (or higher) can ordain other worthy members to priesthood offices up to their own.

=== Priesthood keys ===
Priesthood keys are conferred upon the presidents of priesthood quorums. A quorum is a group of priesthood holders who hold the same priesthood office. For a priesthood holder to exercise ecclesiastical power or authority, Latter Day Saints believe that a priesthood holder must have a specific set of keys or be authorized by one who holds those keys. Thus, even though a priesthood holder is called and ordained with general priesthood power, formally leading others in the church or to conduct specific rites may also require keys not held by all priesthood holders. The existence of keys makes possible a church hierarchy, in which particular priesthood holders specialize in a particular ecclesiastical function, organized in a top-down manner.

Priesthood keys are passed in much the same way as priesthood power in general, usually through the laying on of hands. The manner and rigor with which the concept of keys is applied varies from denomination to denomination within the Latter Day Saint movement.

In the LDS Church, the following declaration by Merrill J. Bateman, a general authority, explains how priesthood keys function:

"The priesthood is the power and authority of God delegated to man. Priesthood keys are the right to direct the use of that power. The President of the Church holds the keys necessary for governing the entire Church. His counselors in the First Presidency and the Quorum of the Twelve Apostles also hold the keys of the kingdom and operate under the President's direction. Stake presidents, bishops, and temple, mission, and quorum presidents are given keys to guide the Church in their jurisdictions. Their counselors do not hold keys."

== Priesthood offices and quorums ==
Within the priesthood, there are many offices, each of which represents a category of positions within the clerical hierarchy of the church. The number and nature of these offices have changed over time, and may differ between Latter Day Saint sects; however, by the death of Joseph Smith, these offices included at least the following:

- deacon
- teacher
- priest
- bishop and Presiding Bishop
- elder
- high priest
- seventy
- patriarch and Presiding Patriarch
- apostle

Ordination to an office does not necessarily mean ordination to a position of leadership. Priesthood holders are organized into quorums, which each have a president or presidents. Each quorum president holds priesthood keys. The president or presidents may or may not be given counselors to assist them.

== History of the priesthood in the Latter Day Saint tradition ==
Because Latter Day Saints believe that priesthood authority and keys may be granted only by one who holds that authority or keys, they believe it is important that a person trace their priesthood through a line of succession from a person in the Bible who was known to hold that authority or keys. Moreover, Latter Day Saints believe that the priesthood authority was absent from the earth during the Great Apostasy, and that priesthood had to be restored through Joseph Smith. Catholic and Orthodox Christians do not believe that such a complete apostasy ever took place when defending the validity of their priesthoods, and these churches do not recognize the priesthood exercised by Latter Day Saints.

Latter Day Saints believe that ancient prophets and apostles conferred the priesthood directly upon Smith and other early members of the movement.

=== Restoration of the Aaronic priesthood ===
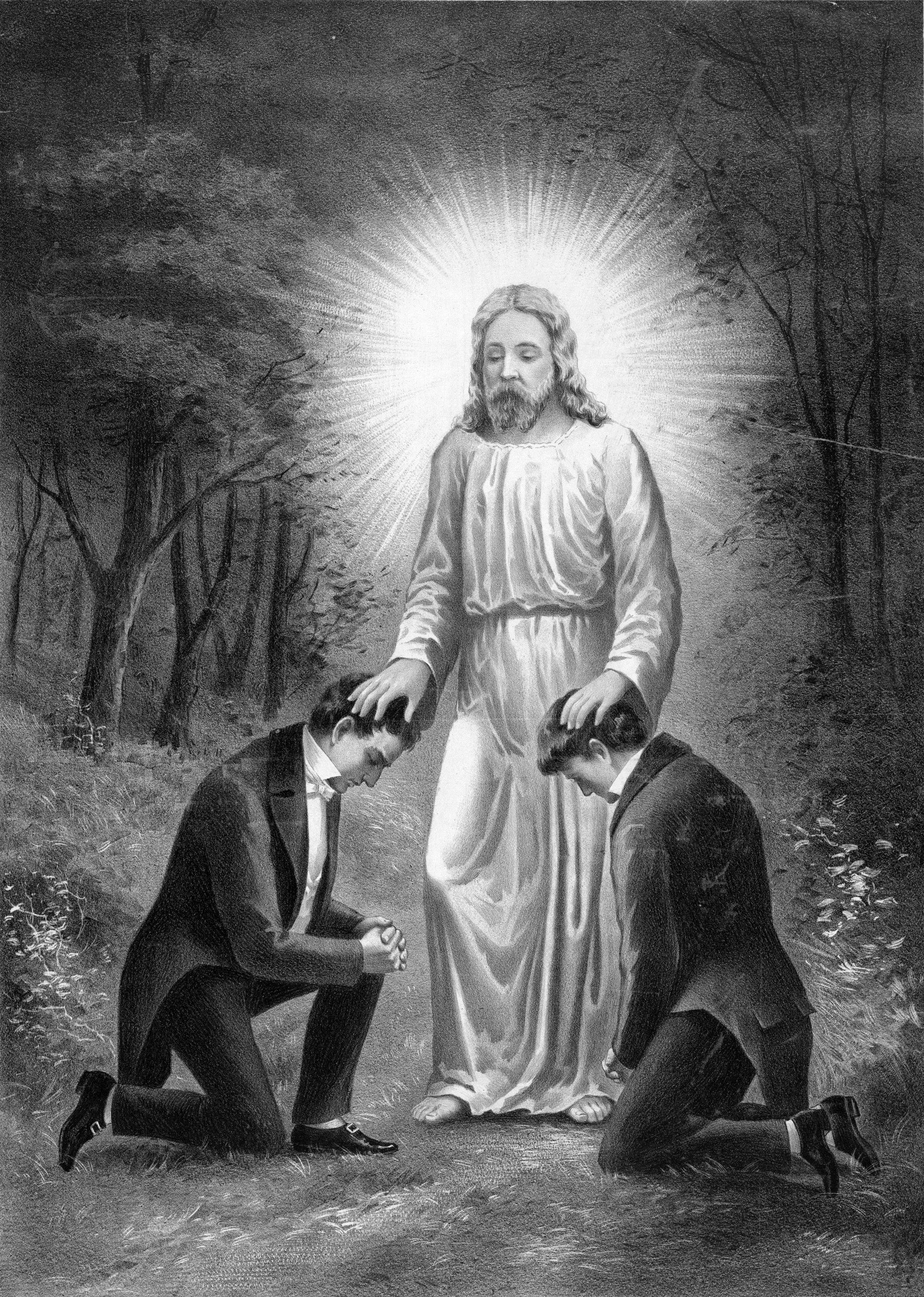
1898 depiction of the Restoration of the Aaronic Priesthood.

Church members initially viewed priesthood as a charismatic authority. By 1832, however, Smith indicated for the first time, in an unpublished history, that the priesthood had been received by the "ministering of Angels" In 1834, Oliver Cowdery provided the first public announcement that the priesthood had been conferred by "an angel of God... clothed with glory" on May 15, 1829. Cowdery and Smith later identified the angel as John the Baptist.

In 1838, Joseph Smith described the event as follows:

[W]e ... went into the woods to pray and inquire of the Lord respecting baptism for the remission of sins, that we found mentioned in the translation of the plates, The Book of Mormon. ... While we were thus employed, praying and calling upon the Lord, a messenger from heaven descended in a cloud of light, and having laid his hands upon us, he ordained us, saying:

Upon you my fellow servants, in the name of Messiah, I confer the Priesthood of Aaron, which holds the keys of the ministering of angels, and of the gospel of repentance, and of baptism by immersion for the remission of sins; and this shall never be taken again from the earth until the sons of Levi do offer again an offering unto the Lord in righteousness.

He said this Aaronic Priesthood had not the power of laying on hands for the gift of the Holy Ghost, but that this should be conferred on us hereafter; and he commanded us to go and be baptized, and gave us directions that I should baptize Oliver Cowdery, and that afterwards he should baptize me.

Accordingly we went and were baptized. ...

The messenger who visited us on this occasion and conferred this Priesthood upon us, said that his name was John, the same that is called John the Baptist in the New Testament, and that he acted under the direction of Peter, James and John, who held the keys of the Priesthood of Melchizedek, which Priesthood, he said, would in due time be conferred on us, and that I should be called the first Elder of the Church, and he (Oliver Cowdery) the second. ...

Immediately on our coming up out of the water after we had been baptized, we experienced great and glorious blessings from our Heavenly Father. No sooner had I baptized Oliver Cowdery, than the Holy Ghost fell upon him, and he stood up and prophesied many things which should shortly come to pass. And again, so soon as I had been baptized by him, I also had the spirit of prophecy, when, standing up, I prophesied concerning the rise of this Church, and many other things connected with the Church, and this generation of the children of men. We were filled with the Holy Ghost, and rejoiced in the God of our salvation.

=== Restoration of the Melchizedek priesthood ===
Unlike the restoration of the Aaronic priesthood, Smith never provided a date for the restoration of the Melchizedek priesthood, and never clearly indicated how this authority was conferred. Smith first specifically introduced the Melchizedek or high priesthood to the church in 1831. In his 1832 history, he referred to "a confirmation and reception of the high Priesthood after the holy order of the son of the living God power and ordinance from on high to preach the Gospel in the administration and demonstration of the spirit the Keys of the Kingdom of God conferred on him [Smith] and the continuation of the blessings of God to him".

Though specific details were lacking, by the turn of the 20th century, Latter Day Saint theologians were convinced that such a conferral had occurred prior to the organization of the Church of Christ on April 6, 1830. This was largely because the early church organization contained the office of elder, which by 1835 was considered an office of the Melchizedek priesthood. As evidence for such a pre-organization angelic conferral, writers referred to a revelation in which Smith said he heard "[t]he voice of Peter, James, and John in the wilderness between Harmony, Susquehanna county, and Colesville, Broome county, on the Susquehanna river, declaring themselves as possessing the keys of the kingdom, and of the dispensation of the fulness of times!" Thus, most Latter Day Saints believe that Smith and Cowdery were visited by the three angels and that they conferred the Melchizedek priesthood in the same way John the Baptist had conferred the Aaronic priesthood.

However, the official church history, supervised or written by Smith, states that "the authority of the Melchizedek priesthood was manifested and conferred for the first time upon several of the Elders" during a general conference of the church in early June 1831. When Smith's official history was first published in 1902, the compiler, B. H. Roberts, thought that this was a mistake, because it would not be consistent with the then-common Mormon belief that the priesthood had been conferred prior to the church's founding in 1830.

However, some recent Mormon historians accept Smith's history as correct and consistent with other historical records showing that other Mormons present at the conference dated the restoration of the Melchizedek priesthood to 1831. This conference had been a very significant event in the early church history, coming soon after the conversion of Sidney Rigdon, who believed that Mormon missionaries lacked the necessary power to adequately preach the gospel. Thus, in January 1831, Smith issued a revelation where he wrote that after Mormons relocated to Kirtland, Ohio, they would "be endowed with power from on high" and "sent forth". In a revelation given to an individual, Smith assured the man that "at the conference meeting he [would] be ordained unto power from on high". One of Smith's associates that was present at the conference expressed the view that this ordination "consisted [of] the endowment—it being a new order—and bestowed authority", and later that year, an early convert who had left the church claimed that many of the Saints "have been ordained to the High Priesthood, or the order of Melchizedek; and profess to be endowed with the same power as the ancient apostles were". In 1835, the historical record was muddled a bit when the first edition of the Doctrine and Covenants altered pre-1831 revelations to make a distinction between the Aaronic and Melchizedek priesthoods, and to classify the offices of elder and apostle as part of the latter.

=== Restoration of other Priesthood keys ===
In addition to the restoration of the Melchizedek priesthood (and the keys of the apostleship), additional priesthood keys were conferred on Joseph Smith and others. Smith dictated the following passage as a revelation following the dedication of the Kirtland Temple:

After this vision closed, the heavens were again opened unto us; and Moses appeared before us, and committed unto us the keys of the gathering of Israel from the four parts of the earth, and the leading of the ten tribes from the land of the north. After this, Elias appeared, and committed the dispensation of the gospel of Abraham, saying that in us and our seed all generations after us should be blessed. After this vision had closed, another great and glorious vision burst upon us; for Elijah the prophet, who was taken to heaven without tasting death, stood before us, and said: Behold, the time has fully come, which was spoken of by the mouth of Malachi—testifying that he [Elijah] should be sent, before the great and dreadful day of the Lord come—To turn the hearts of the fathers to the children, and the children to the fathers, lest the whole earth be smitten with a curse—Therefore, the keys of this dispensation are committed into your hands; and by this ye may know that the great and dreadful day of the Lord is near, even at the doors.

== Priesthood in the LDS Church ==
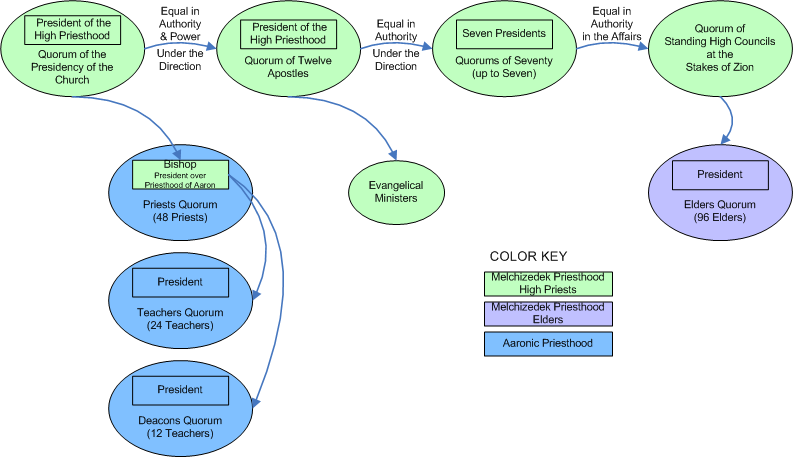
Visual of D&C Section 107.

In the LDS Church, the largest denomination of the Latter Day Saint movement, priesthood is recognized only in men and boys, who are ordained to offices in the priesthood as a matter of course once they reach the year in which they turn age 12, so long as they meet requirements of worthiness. There are no other requirements for ordination, although prior to 1978, the church did not ordain men or boys who were deemed to be of black African descent, based on the mid-19th century teachings of Brigham Young, which the church felt it could not abandon without a revelation from God. (See Black people and priesthood (LDS)). The doctrine was eliminated in 1978 and the church now allows all men to hold the priesthood, subject to worthiness.

Priesthood is structured as a vertical hierarchy with a clear chain of command. At each level in the hierarchy, the priesthood is organized by quorums, led by a presidency, which usually consists of a president and two counselors. The church recognizes the two major "orders" of priesthood, Aaronic and Melchizedek, the latter being limited to adult men who have held the Aaronic priesthood.

== Priesthood in the Community of Christ ==
The Community of Christ teaches that all Christians are called by their gifts and talents to the ministry, priesthood is seen as a particular expression of universal ministry to which all are called. Since 1984, the church has ordained both women and men to the priesthood. All offices are deemed equal in importance, but the duties and responsibilities of each differ.

For a person to be called to the priesthood for the first time, his or her calling is typically discerned by the pastor of the local congregation. These priesthood calls are approved after review by a Mission Center President and vote of a congregational conference. For certain calls, especially to higher offices of the priesthood, the discernment will come through other church officials and approval will be voted upon at a Mission Center Conference or World Conference. Once the call has been administratively processed it is presented to the individual called. If that individual accepts the call and is sustained by a conference vote, he or she will be ordained to that office.

== See also ==
- List of articles about Mormonism
- Priesthood blessing
