= Outline of the Doctrine and Covenants =

The following outline is an overview and topical guide for the Doctrine and Covenants.

The Doctrine and Covenants is a compilation of texts canonized as scripture by various denominations of the Latter Day Saint movement. Organized into sections in most editions, adherents regard many of the compiled texts as revelations given by the Christian God through a prophet.

== Background ==
- Latter Day Saint Movement
- Mormonism
- Revelation in Mormonism
- Standard works

== Sections and sources ==
- Account of John
- Book of Commandments
- Word of Wisdom
- "Lectures on Faith"
- Letter from Liberty Jail
- 1890 Manifesto
- 1978 Revelation on Priesthood

== People ==
The following people were involved in the Doctrine and Covenants:

- People who dictated, scribed, or wrote parts of the text
  - Joseph Smith
  - Oliver Cowdery
  - Sidney Rigdon
  - David Whitmer
  - John Whitmer
  - Orson Hyde
  - John Taylor
  - Brigham Young
  - Joseph Smith III
  - Wilford Woodruff
  - Joseph F. Smith
  - Frederick M Smith
  - Israel A. Smith
  - W. Wallace Smith
  - Spencer W. Kimball
  - Wallace B. Smith
  - W. Grant McMurray
  - Stephen M. Veazy
- People who are subjects of parts of the text
  - List of code names in the Doctrine and Covenants
  - Martin Harris
  - Hiram Page
  - Edward Partridge
  - Emma Smith
  - Frederick G. Williams
  - Thomas B. Marsh

== Topics ==
- Degrees of glory
- Marriage
  - Celestial marriage
  - Mormonism and polygamy
- Nature of the Godhead
- One Mighty and Strong
- Priesthood
  - Bishops
  - Ordination of women in Christianity
- Sacrament (LDS Church)
- School of the Prophets
- Second Coming
- Temples
  - Independence Temple
  - Temple (LDS Church)
- United Order
- Zion

== Denominations ==
The following denominations use or have used the Doctrine and Covenants:

- Church of Christ
- The Church of Jesus Christ of Latter-day Saints
- Community of Christ
- Church of Jesus Christ of Latter Day Saints (Strangite)
- Church of Christ (Temple Lot)
- Church of Jesus Christ (Cutlerite)
- Mormon fundamentalism
- Restoration branches of the RLDS
- Remnant Church of Jesus Christ of Latter Day Saints
- Remnant fellowships
