= Mahalaleel =

Mahalaleel may refer to:

- The name of an individual in the Generations of Adam, also called Mahalalel
- The name of a descendant of Perez, in the Book of Nehemiah
- A code name for Algernon Sidney Gilbert used in the Doctrine and Covenants - see List of code names in the Doctrine and Covenants
