= Mary Elizabeth Rollins Lightner =

Plural wife of Joseph Smith and Mormon pioneer

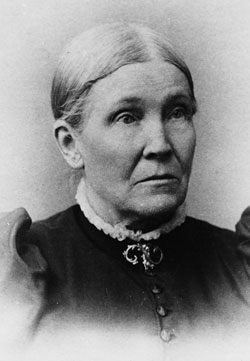
- Born: Mary Elizabeth Rollins; April 9, 1818; Lima, New York, U.S.
- Died: December 17, 1913 (aged 95); Minersville, Utah, U.S.
- Spouse(s): Adam Lightner; Joseph Smith; Brigham Young
- Children: 10
- Family: Algernon Sidney Gilbert (uncle)

Mary Elizabeth Rollins Lightner (April 9, 1818 – December 17, 1913) was a member of the Church of Jesus Christ of Latter-day Saints (LDS Church) and a Mormon pioneer. One of the plural wives of Joseph Smith and Brigham Young, Lightner is credited with rescuing papers that were later published as part of the Doctrine and Covenants from anti-Mormon mobs.

== Early life ==
Mary Elizabeth Rollins was born April 9, 1818, in Lima, New York, to John D. Rollins and Keziah Keturah Van Benthuysen. She was one of three children. Her father died in a shipwreck on Lake Ontario when she was a child. In 1828, she and her family moved to Kirtland, Ohio, to live with her uncle Algernon Sidney Gilbert. They lived there for two years.

During that time, they learned about the church established by Joseph Smith. She was baptized into the church in October 1830. She was lent a Book of Mormon by Isaac Morley for one night. She and her family stayed up late reading it, and she had memorized the first verse by morning. When she went to give the book back to Morley, he was impressed at how much she had read and he let her keep it until she finished. At the time she read the Book of Mormon, Mary was eleven years old. Shortly after she finished reading the Book of Mormon, Joseph Smith moved to Kirtland in February 1831. Smith was brought to her home and she received a blessing from him by the laying on of hands.

== Jackson County ==
In the fall of 1831, she and her family left Kirtland for Independence, Missouri. Here Mary experienced the interpretation of tongues. She interpreted several sermons from other languages. She started working for Peter Whitmer Sr. as a seamstress. She met Governor Lilburn Boggs while working for Whitmer. Boggs tried to convince Mary to leave the church and live with them, but she refused. She recorded that many people persecuted members of the church in Missouri. Mobs destroyed their houses and set fire to their crops. She witnessed the tarring and feathering of Edward Partridge.

=== Saving papers ===
Mary also witnessed the destruction of the printing press in Independence on July 20, 1833. She watched as a mob tore down the building housing it and threw pages of the Book of Commandments into the streets. She and her sister Caroline grabbed armfuls of the paper, despite the mob pursuing them. They hid in a cornfield until the mob passed. They turned over the papers to Sally Phelps, the wife of W. W. Phelps. Later, some of the pages were bound and given to Mary. They were later published as part of the Doctrine and Covenants.

Members of the church were forced to flee Independence to adjacent Clay County, Missouri, where Mary became a teacher. She taught for two years. Her mother remarried, and Mary lived with her uncle Gilbert until he died in 1834. During this time, she also witnessed the expedition of Zion's Camp, and was reunited with Joseph Smith again. Smith later commented to Mary that in 1834 he received a revelation to marry her as a plural wife. But because of physical separation and distance, he did not pursue the marriage.

== Far West ==
Mary Rollins was married to Adam Lightner on August 11, 1835. He was not a Latter Day Saint. They would go on to have ten children. They moved to Far West, Missouri, to open a store. The couple's first son, Miles Henry, was born in 1836. Towards the end of 1837, they moved to Milford, Missouri, just outside of Far West, to open another branch of the store. They faced persecution in Milford as well. She and her husband were requested to meet with a mob and their leader, a General Clark. They were told that Governor Boggs was going to destroy the city, but that he requested her family and another be safely evacuated first. Mary refused to leave everyone else behind. The next day, the mob took Joseph and Hyrum Smith but did not harm Far West.

Mary and her family went to Louisville, Kentucky, to visit Adam's brother, leaving their possessions in Far West. They rented a house there for six months. She was offered work as a seamstress, but refused because the pay was too low. She painted some pictures and sold them, and would go on to give many painting lessons to earn money.

== Nauvoo ==
Although her family struggled financially, the Lightners traveled through St. Louis, Missouri, on their way to rejoin the Latter Day Saints in Alton, Illinois, where Mary's brother James Henry was. On their trip, she taught painting lessons to a woman on board the boat. Mary continued giving painting lessons and found acceptable work as a seamstress when they moved to Farmington, Illinois, where they stayed for two years. They lost their money when their bank failed, and they went to live with Mary's stepfather, Mr. Burt.

While their family moved many times, Mary often found work as a seamstress and a painting teacher. Some of her students included Julia Murdock Smith and Sarah Ann Whitney. The Latter Day Saints left the area of Nauvoo, Illinois. Before leaving, Mary recounts that Joseph Smith came to her family and her brother's family and told them to be rebaptized. All were baptized except her husband, who was not a member. Adam said that he did not feel worthy. In February 1842, Mary was sealed to Joseph Smith as a plural wife. In 1843, she was accepted into the women's Relief Society of Nauvoo.

== Pontoosuc ==
Their family moved to Pontoosuc, Illinois. Joseph Smith was upset by this and told Mary that if they left the church, they would suffer hardships. Her son George died. Mary had her fourth child in May 1843. Shortly after, she became ill with "inflammation of the bowels". She stayed in bed, and woke up once to find everyone in her household lying on the floor as if they were dead. While she was in bed, lightning had struck the house. She and all members of the family eventually recovered.

Men from Pontoosuc sought to kill Joseph Smith in June 1844. They made Mary make a flag for their company. While she refused, they threatened her and she made the flag. This group was part of the mob that attacked Carthage Jail, which resulted in the death of Joseph Smith and his brother Hyrum. Mary's family was kept in Pontoosuc for three months and robbed of many of their possessions by these men. Mary became sick again, and doctors said that she would die shortly. She felt the urge to go to Nauvoo to get a blessing from Alpheus Cutler, who worked in the Nauvoo Temple. Her friends and family feared that the trip would kill her, but she insisted on going. She did make it to Nauvoo and received a blessing and felt better within two weeks.

Mary received her endowment in the Nauvoo Temple on January 30, 1845. While earning money to make the trip to the temple, she was sewing and got half of a needle stuck in her arm, which doctors couldn't remove in June 1847. Previously, in the fall of 1844, Brigham Young and Heber C. Kimball offered themselves as proxy husbands to widows of Joseph Smith. Mary accepted the offer from Young, and she and Young were sealed on May 22, 1845, in the temple.

== Living in the North ==
After having another son in February 1848, she took a job as a tailor. Her husband had a harder time finding work, and they were offered a job maintaining a hotel in St. Croix Falls, Wisconsin. There Adam and their baby became very sick. Mary's leg swelled and she almost had her leg amputated. She records that she prayed for God to spare her limb. While living there, a man stopped by her house and offered her a medicine that would supposedly heal anything. Uninterested, but in an attempt to get the man to leave, she, her husband and her aunt tasted the medicine. She even gave some to her children. Within moments, they all became ill and two of her children died. The man had given them poison. The man was caught by authorities, but Mary begged them not to hang him. They were going to put the man on trial, but he escaped and was never tried.

The family bought a 65-acre farm near Lake St. Croix, Minnesota. However, they faced many hardships and several of their horses died. They accepted a job keeping a three-story hotel in Willow River, Minnesota, and stayed for two years. Mary left to take care of her sister Caroline who was sick and lived in Farmington in 1853; her sister died five weeks later. Mary took some of Caroline's children home with her to raise them. The family later moved to Maine in 1854 and opened their own boarding house. They lost their property in the Civil War. After suffering so many losses, Mary convinced her husband that they should rejoin the Latter Day Saints.

== Traveling westward ==
After their hotel failed, they moved back to Missouri to Hannibal. After staying only a year, they returned to Minnesota where their tenth child, Adam, was born on October 28, 1862. they boarded the "Canada" headed for St. Louis on May 25, 1863 and began traveling westward. They were faced by threats from soldiers, Indians and plagues of sickness. They reached Omaha, Nebraska, and met up with other Latter Day Saints from England, South Africa, and Denmark. They traveled across the plains in a wagon company. They arrived in Salt Lake City, Utah on September 15, 1863.

== Minersville ==
The Lightners settled Minersville, Utah. In 1869, the Relief Society was organized there, and Mary was called to be its president. Mary's mother died in 1877, and Brigham Young died later that same year. After 1880, Adam was unable to find work. Mary wrote to church president John Taylor in September 1881, reporting that she needed financial assistance. In August 1884, Mary went to Salt Lake City to ask for help in person. Adam became ill and died on August 19, 1885. He never joined the church. He left Mary with over $100 in debt. Shortly after her husband's death, Mary's son was convicted of grand larceny. She worked hard to get her son Adam Jr. out of jail; he was released in June 1886. He died four years later.

Mary lived the rest of her life destitute. She may have suffered depression. She traveled occasionally to Salt Lake City. She relied on the church to receive money since she was one of Joseph Smith's widows. She did speak at meetings, sharing her life experiences about the early days of the church and her testimony. Mary spoke at the graduation ceremony at Brigham Young University on April 14, 1905. She was promised by Heber C. Kimball before his death that she would see Joseph Smith again during her lifetime. In 1905, she shared that she had been visited by Smith after his death. Mary Rollins Lightner died on December 17, 1913, in Minersville. At the time of her death, she was the last surviving plural wife of Smith.

== Marriage ==
Mary claimed that Smith had a private conversation with her in 1831, when she was only 12. He told her that she "was the first woman God commanded him to take as a plural wife." He approached her in 1834 again; however, she married Adam Lightner on August 11, 1835. She admitted later that she had had dreams of being Smith's wife. She reported that Smith told her that an angel threatened to take away his life unless he followed God's instruction to practice plural marriage. He also predicted that her husband would not join the church and, therefore, she needed to be sealed to a priesthood holder. Mary would not marry Smith until she had received a witness from God for herself. She prayed about the proposal, and reported that she saw an angel pass through her room. Smith then told her that certain events would take place in her life, and they did. Mary consented to be married to Smith, although the sealing did not cancel her marriage to Adam. She was the sixth of Smith's plural wives. They were sealed in February 1842 by Brigham Young. At the time, Mary was pregnant with her son George. Mary mentions that her husband was away at the time of her sealing to Smith, so Adam's consent or knowledge is unclear. Smith's first wife, Emma Smith, knew about the marriage. Mary later reported that she knew that Smith had other children by his plural wives. Mary signed an affidavit in 1902 to document her sealing to Smith.

After Joseph Smith's death in 1844, Mary was sealed to Brigham Young. The sealing was performed in the Nauvoo Temple on May 22, 1845. Mary recorded, "I was also sealed to Brigham Young as proxy for Joseph." When Mary lived in Minersville, she records that Young stopped by to visit. She wrote to him and updated him on how her family was doing throughout her life. Through correspondence letters between Mary and Eliza R. Snow, it appears that Mary knew and was friendly towards other plural wives of Young.
