= School of the Prophets =

In Latter Day Saint history, a group of early leaders

In the early Latter Day Saint movement, the School of the Prophets (School, also called the "school of the elders" or "school for the Prophets") was a select group of early leaders who began meeting on January 23, 1833 in Kirtland, Ohio under the direction of Joseph Smith for both theological and secular learning.

The school was opened with a 2-day ritual, which included the first recorded version of the controversial Second Anointing, the highest ordinance in the Latter-day Saint movement. In the ceremony, a towel-clad Joseph Smith washed the feet of all 12 men present, including Sidney Rigdon, Newel K. Whitney, Joseph Smith Sr. and Hyrum Smith. Joseph taught that after the ceremony they had all been "sealed up unto heaven."

== Etymology ==
The phrase "the School of the Prophets" has been identified as the naioth or "dwellings" in Ramah in 1 Samuel 19:18-24 where the fellowship or "school of the prophets" assembled to worship, pray, and ask God for wisdom. It was also applied to Harvard University in 1655 when the Reverend Thomas Shepard asked the United Colonies Commissioners to find "some way of comfortable maintenance for that School of the Prophets that now is" and suggested that each family in New England give one-quarter bushel of wheat to the college. It was more commonly applied in the 18th century to Yale University, and it was the title of a history of Yale from 1701 to 1740 by Richard Warch.

Historian Joseph F. Darowski has called attention to earlier Old Testament and Protestant precedents, stating that Harvard and Yale were both once commonly called schools of the prophets.

== History ==
=== Creation ===
A revelation in the Doctrine and Covenants (D&C) begins by commanding that a house be prepared for the Presidency of the School of the Prophets. (D&C 88:127-141) The School is to instruct all the officers of the church in all things expedient. This revelation goes on to describe how the meetings of the School are to begin—including a special salutation and the washing of the feet of all its members. Another D&C revelation (Section 90) reveals that the "keys" of the School have been given to the church presidency "That thereby they [the church] may be perfected in their ministry for the salvation of Zion, and of the nations of Israel, and of the Gentiles, as many as will believe. That through your administration they may receive the word, and through their administration, the word may go forth unto the ends of the earth, unto the Gentiles first, and then, behold, and lo, they shall turn unto the Jews. And then cometh the day when the arm of the Lord shall be revealed in power in convincing the nations, the heathen nations, the house of Joseph, of the gospel of their salvation."

The first meeting of the School was held on January 24, 1833, at the home-based store owned by Newel K. Whitney in Kirtland, Ohio. The school provided a setting for spiritual experiences and in-depth discussions of gospel principles, as preparation for those who would preach as missionaries. One such experience was the revelation now known as the Word of Wisdom. In April 1833 the school was disbanded as missionaries embarked.

=== Other early schools ===
In summer 1833, another branch of this school was created under the direction of Parley P. Pratt in Independence, Missouri, called the School in Zion. This school was praised in revelation (D&C 97:3), and met weekly with about 60 students in an outdoor setting. After the Mormons were expelled from Independence, the school was reconstituted in Kirtland in November 1834-35, as the School of the Elders. A series of seven lectures presented at the school were published as part of the Doctrine and Covenants in 1835 and later came to be known as the "Lectures on Faith." In 1836, the school was again called the School of the Prophets. Though the School went into recess, it is apparent Joseph Smith planned to revive it after the completion of the Kirtland Temple.

=== The Utah period ===
Following the 1844 succession crisis which ensued after Smith's death, Brigham Young led those who followed him in what is now the Church of Jesus Christ of Latter-day Saints (LDS Church) to Utah, where Young began several schools of the prophets during his tenure as church president, beginning in 1867 in Salt Lake City. Initially, it was a forum to discuss church issues among its leaders and selected priesthood holders, under the auspices of the University of Deseret. Later, branches were opened in the larger LDS Church communities under the direction of local priesthood leaders, with discussion expanding into religion, economics, and civic matters. Branches opened in Provo, Logan, Brigham City, Spanish Fork, Nephi, Ephraim, American Fork, and Ogden.

These confidential, invitation-only classes were closed in 1872 before a reorganized School of the Prophets was created in Salt Lake City for general authorities and other church leaders. This school worked toward creating economic cooperatives in the church, and when the United Order was incorporated in 1874, the school was dissolved.

Young's successor, John Taylor, also organized schools of the prophets in Salt Lake City and St. George in 1883, following the model of the original school in Missouri, but these were short-lived and probably dissolved in early 1884.

== Sources ==
- Backman, Milton V. Jr. (2005). "School of the Prophets and School of the Elders". In Susan Easton Black; Andrew C. Skinner (eds.). Joseph: Exploring the Life and Ministry of the Prophet. Salt Lake City: Deseret Book. pp. 165–75. ISBN 1-59038-471-7. OCLC 59817848.
- Patrick, John R. (1970). The School of the Prophets: Its Development and Influence in Utah Territory (M.A. thesis). Provo, UT: Department of History, Brigham Young University.
- Peterson, Orlen Curtis (1972). A History of the Schools and Educational Programs of The Church of Jesus Christ of Latter-Day Saints in Ohio and Missouri, 1831-1839 (M.A. thesis). Provo, UT: Department of Church History and Doctrine, Brigham Young University.
- Sorensen, Steven R. (1992), "Schools of the Prophets", in Ludlow, Daniel H (ed.), Encyclopedia of Mormonism, New York: Macmillan Publishing, pp. 1269–1270, ISBN 0-02-879602-0, OCLC 24502140
