= Gazelem =

Gazelem (/ɡəˈzeɪlɪm/;) is a person or object mentioned in the Book of Alma, within the Book of Mormon.

Alma the Younger makes a reference to Gazelem in his instructions to his son Helaman. It has been theorized that Gazelem was a Jaredite seer. Joseph Smith used Gazelam (sic) as one of his code names in the Doctrine and Covenants.

== In scripture ==
Alma 37:23 reads, "And the Lord said: I will prepare unto my servant Gazelem, a stone, which shall shine forth in darkness unto light, that I may discover unto my people who serve me, that I may discover unto them the works of their brethren, yea, their secret works, their works of darkness, and their wickedness and abominations."

== Interpretation ==
The punctuation seems to indicate that Gazelem is the name of the stone, not the servant, but this interpretation is not universal. The manuscript of the Book of Mormon which Joseph Smith presented to E. B. Grandin for printing did not have punctuation; Grandin added punctuation with Smith's permission. The index to the current LDS edition of the Book of Mormon defines Gazelem as "Name given to servant of God."

The identity of Gazelem is uncertain, but the most likely candidates are (the seer stones used by) Mosiah and Joseph Smith. The Jaredites are the people whose secret works Gazelem is to bring to light, and both Mosiah and Joseph Smith are supposed to have used seer stones to translate the Jaredite record.

If Gazelem is a prophet, contemporary to the early Nephites, who was given a Urim and Thummim, then there must have been two sets of interpreters among them. The other set of interpreters were the ones given to the Brother of Jared. They were later buried with the plates and used to translate the Book of Mormon (See Ether 3:23; D&C 17:1). Another possibility is that Gazelem is not a proper name but a title for a seer. Thirdly, the name may be a reference to Joseph Smith, who was referred to in the D&C as "Gazelam" when code names were used to conceal the identity of those referred to in the revelations.

The word Gazelem appears to have its roots in Gaz - a stone and Aleim, a name of God as a revelator or interposer in the affairs of men. If this suggestion be correct, its roots admirably agree with its apparent meaning-a seer. —George Reynolds, Dictionary of the Book of Mormon, p. 92.

This may well be a play on words. Is Gazelem the seer stone or the servant? It is difficult to tell from the passage and depends very much on the placement of a comma in the sentence. Perhaps it could refer to both. It is interesting to note that when Jesus called Simon Peter to the ministry he said: 'Thou art Simon the son of Jona: thou shalt be called Cephas, which is, by interpretation, a seer, or a stone' (JST, John 1:42). Though this name or title of Gazelem may be used in regard to any seer who utilizes seer stones, it seems in this instance to be a direct reference to Joseph Smith the Prophet or another. We must emphasize that the Prophet Joseph Smith had the tradition of writing names as in the case of the brother of Jared who reveals it in a blessing. —McConkie and Millet, Doctrinal Commentary on the Book of Mormon, vol. 3, p. 278.

== Code name ==
In early editions of the Doctrine and Covenants, Gazelam (sic) is one of the code names used for Joseph Smith, suggesting that he may have identified himself with Gazelem of the Book of Mormon.
