= Leman Copley =

American Mormon missionary

Leman Copley (March 25, 1781 – December 1862) was an early convert to The Church of Jesus Christ of Latter-day Saints. Born in Connecticut, Copley moved to Rutland County, Vermont, sometime before 1800 and was living in Thompson Township, Ohio, by 1820. Prior to his conversion to the Church of Christ, Copley was a Shaker.

Copley was born in Connecticut in 1781. His father’s name was Samuel Copley. He married a woman named Salley, with whom he had one son. While living in Pittsford, Vermont, he joined the United Society of Believers in Christ's Second Appearing (the Shakers) and moved to join others of the faith near Cleveland, Ohio.

He later joined the Church of Christ (predecessor to the Church of Jesus Christ of Latter-day Saints), but maintained his Shaker beliefs in some aspects. Prompted by Copley’s belief system, Joseph Smith, the founder of the Latter Day Saint movement, petitioned God for an explanation of the Shaker’s beliefs in the context of religious truth, resulting in section 49 of the Doctrine and Covenants. In March 1831, Copley was called by Smith through a revelation to preach the gospel to the Shakers along with Sidney Rigdon and Parley P. Pratt. The three read Doctrine and Covenants section 49 to the Shakers, but the group rejected it.

When the members of the branch of the Church of Christ from Colesville, New York came to settle in Ohio, Copley was persuaded to allow them to settle on his large farm of nearly 1000 acres. Then, when he and the church had a falling out, he forced them all to leave. Joseph Smith received a revelation to have the "Colesville Saints" go to Missouri, where God would reveal to Smith the location of the land of Zion. This was the beginning of the church's movement to Missouri and the dual centers of church activity (i.e. Kirtland, Ohio and Independence, Missouri). Copley was disfellowshipped in 1832 for refusing to keep his promise to help the Colesville Saints. Then, at Doctor Philastus Hurlbut's 1834 trial, Copley testified against Joseph Smith.

Copley was readmitted into full fellowship with the church in April 1836. He served another mission in March 1833, this time with Doctor Hurlbut. He did not travel west with the rest of the Mormon pioneers. Sometime before 1850, Copley moved to Madison, Ohio, where he died in May 1862.
