= Zion's Central Board of Trade =

In the Utah Territory in 1879, Zion's Central Board of Trade was established by John Taylor, the newly sustained President of the LDS Church, not long after the death of his predecessor Brigham Young. Young had attempted and failed to successfully institute the United Order a second time among the members of the church. President Taylor had seen the success of the Cache Valley Board of Trade and saw it as vehicle to prepare the people for voluntary economic unity.

== Purposes & Objectives ==
=== General Purposes ===
The long-run purpose of the association was "to prepare the way for a more completely cooperative society" among the Mormon settlements. Utah historian, Edward Tullidge, reported that the movement promised to overcome the perennial conflict between Capital and Labor through the creation of industrial cooperatives. This perspective was echoed by the editor of the Deseret News at the time, "Here is the grandest opportunity for the building up of a self-sustaining, industrial and powerful system of cooperative effort ever offered in the history of the world.... What is needed? Practical cooperation. Union of capital and labor, mutual interest between consumer and producer."

=== Specific Objectives ===
The Preamble of the Articles of Association of Zion's Central Board of Trade offers a long list of specific objectives for the association:

- To maintain a commercial exchange;
- to promote uniformity in the customs and usages of producers, manufacturers, and merchants;
- to inculcate principles of justice and equity in trade;
- to facilitate the speedy adjustment of business disputes;
- to arrange for transportation;
- to seek remunerative markets for home products; to foster capital and protect labor, uniting them as friends rather than dividing them as enemies;
- to encourage manufacturing;
- to aid in placing imported articles in the hands of consumers as cheaply as possible;
- to acquire and to disseminate valuable agricultural, manufacturing, commercial and economic information,
- to secure to its members the benefits of co-operation in the furtherance of their legitimate pursuits,
- to unite and harmonize the business relations of the Stake Boards of Trade, now and hereafter to be organized throughout the Territory, with those of the Central Association.

== Activities ==
=== Central Board of Trade ===
- On May 17, 1881, the Zion's Central Board of Trade held a convention in Salt Lake City, inviting representatives of the various Stake boards of trade, "for the purpose of arriving at a better understanding of what is needed to more thoroughly develop and assist our home industries; to establish them on a better and firmer footing, and to utilize the natural resources of the Territory." Nineteen industries were on the agenda led by the manufacture of iron and coke.
- Iron and Coke - As a direct result of the Board of Trade convention, a committee organized a company in 1881 for the manufacture of iron and coke. They raised 1 million dollars in capital for the Utah Iron Manufacturing Company. Their energies were dissipated for three years during a court battle over alleged claim-jumping by a wealthy non-Mormon. Afterwards, they reorganized the company with a new influx of capital from the LDS Church and were able to hire 20 men to move needed railway equipment from Nevada to southern Utah.
- Sugar - The Central Board put a great deal of energy in studying and experimenting with various sources of sugar. In the years following the anti-polygamy raids, the Utah Sugar Company was organized by several prominent leaders of the LDS Church and was the beneficiary of that preliminary work.
- Wagons & Agricultural Implements - Here the Board of Trade had its first long-term success. After noting various failed attempts to manufacture these items, the board committee opted to create a buyer's cooperative (similar to the modern consumer cooperative) for importing wagons and farm tools. They launched the Cooperative Wagon and Machine Company with $100,000 of capital in 1883. It later merged with another company and lasted 4 decades.

=== Stake Boards of Trade ===
LDS historian, Leonard Arrington, reported the following activities of the local boards of trade:

- Contract negotiations in behalf of local Mormon railroad workers.
- Established a centralized marketing agency for farm produce.
- Creating cooperatives for importing agricultural implements, wagons, buggies, etc.
- Setting of agencies to regulate hay and grain prices.
- Regulation of specific industries to prevent excessive price and product competition.
- Countering the "monopoly" and "discriminatory tactics" of the Union Pacific Railroad.

== Demise ==
"[T]he enforcement of the Edmunds Anti-polygamy Act in 1884 and thereafter destroyed Zion's Board of Trade. There is no alternative explanation. Board of Trade activities were not declining, but gaining momentum when 'the raid' started."
