= Book of Commandments =

Mormon scriptural text

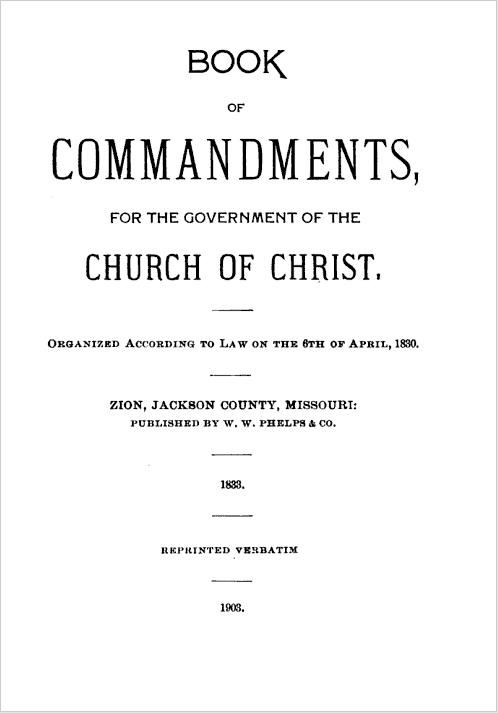
- Title page of a 1903 reprint

Information
- Religion: Latter Day Saint movement
- Period: 19th century
- Chapters: 65

Full text
- Book of Commandments at English Wikisource

The Book of Commandments is the earliest published book to contain the revelations of Joseph Smith Jr. Text published in the Book of Commandments is now considered scripture by the Church of Jesus Christ of Latter-day Saints (LDS Church) as part of the larger Doctrine and Covenants.

== History of the Book of Commandments ==
The Book of Commandments was planned as a compilation of Joseph Smith Jr.'s early prophecies. Smith, leader of the Latter Day Saint movement, gathered several of his revelations for a High Priests council in November 1831. The ten-man council voted to print 10,000 copies, but the actual number of prints was reduced to between three and five thousand.

W. W. Phelps, publisher of the book, ran a press in Independence, Missouri. A faithful Mormon, Phelps also edited an historically important Mormon periodical, The Evening and Morning Star from September 1831 to July 1833. Most revelations in the Book of Commandments had been previously published by Phelps in the Star.

On July 20, 1833 an anti-Mormon and pro-slavery mob destroyed the press. The mob, purportedly frightened of Mormon political power, was incensed by an editorial in Phelps's Evening and Morning Star perceived to be abolitionist. Breaking down the door, they razed Phelps's home and business. At that point, 65 revelations of the Book of Commandments, about two thirds the total, were already printed. Totaling 160 pages, most of the uncut and unbound sheets were destroyed in the ensuing fire. However, some neighbors including teenage sisters Caroline and Mary Elizabeth Rollins saved remnants of nearly 100 copies.

Fewer than 30 are known to exist today, including several incomplete versions. Further enhancing the book's scarcity, several copies of the Book of Commandments are held in permanent collections. For example, The Church of Jesus Christ of Latter-day Saints (LDS Church) and the Community of Christ have multiple copies, and the rare books divisions of the University of Utah Marriott Library, Brigham Young University Harold B. Lee Library, The Library of Congress, and the New York Public Library each own a copy. When sold on the open market, the book regularly fetches over $100,000. An incomplete copy changed hands for $200,000 in 2001, and a complete volume sold at auction for $391,000. Rare books dealer Ken Sanders claims a copy was sold privately in Utah for $500,000. In 2025, Ken Sanders reported a private sale that reached $3,000,000, placing it in the list of most expensive books ever sold.

== Content of the Book of Commandments ==
Many of the revelations in the Book of Commandments were also printed in the official church newspaper, Evening and Morning Star, with relatively superficial and typographical edits.

A much more ambitious revision was made in 1835, when all the revelations contained in the Book of Commandments were edited for inclusion in a larger text of Mormon scriptures called the Doctrine and Covenants. In addition to many superficial changes, this latter work contains significant redactions, deletions, and additions of new material to the older revelations, and the nature of these changes has been controversial, in part because these changes are not widely known by Mormon adherents, and in part because the changes have been used by secular Mormon scholars to support a hypothesis that Mormon theology developed gradually and underwent theological reversals and significant changes. Apologetic scholars tend to minimize the significance of these changes, or to read the two editions of scripture in a way that makes them roughly consistent.

For example, mention of the Christian biblical apostles Peter, James, and John imparting Joseph Smith Jr. with the Melchizedek priesthood is in section 27 of the Doctrine and Covenants, but the tale is omitted from the equivalent chapter in the Book of Commandments.

Secular Mormon scholars argue that these changes reflect the changing doctrines of Joseph Smith, but Mormon apologetic scholars are more likely to hold that the changes are elaborations or clarifications of previously revealed doctrine. For example, a passage often cited by Mormon critics states,

...and he has a gift to translate the book, and I have commanded him that he shall pretend to no other gift, for I will grant him no other gift.

— Book of Commandments 4:2

This passage refers to Joseph Smith in the third person. However, the re-numbered Doctrine and Covenants reads:

...and this is the first gift that I bestowed upon you; and I have commanded that you should pretend to no other gift until my purpose is fulfilled in this; for I will grant unto you no other gift until it is finished.

— Doctrine and Covenants 5:4

== Book of Commandments chapters and Doctrine and Covenants sections ==
Note that the units of the Book of Commandments are chapters, while the Doctrine and Covenants has sections. Chapters of the book correspond exactly to modern D&C sections except for the revisions discussed above.

Book of Commandments 1833 Chapter (out of 65)	D&C 1835 Section (of 102)	LDS D&C 1981 Section (of 138)	Notes
1	1	1	
2	30	3	
3	31	4	
4	32	5	D&C changes to "and I have commanded that you should pretend to no other gift until my purpose is fulfilled in this" as discussed above. Also, specific mention of three witnesses removed, perhaps because 8 more witnesses were allowed to view the Golden Plates.
5	8	6	
6	33	7	Concurrent with the Book of Mormon, this is the first translation project of a parchment Joseph Smith. It was the translation of a parchment that contained the Account of John the apostle. The 1835 and later D&C versions were expanded to include prophesies that Peter James and John would restore the priesthood.
7	34	8	Oliver Cowdery was told that he had the gift of "working with the sprout, behold it hath told you things. Behold there is no other power save God that can cause this thing of Nature<sic> to work in your hands." This refers to a divining rod. Wording was changed in later editions of the Doctrine and Covenants referring to Cowdery's rod as the "gift of Aaron".
8	35	9	
9	36	10	The term " Urim and Thummim" is introduced in the 1835 version, while absent in the 1833 version.
10	37	11	
11	38	12	
12	39	14	
13	40	15	
14	41	16	
15	43	18	
16	44	19	
17-21	45	23	These short chapters contained revelations of no more than 4 sentences each directed toward associates of Joseph Smith. They were combined into one D&C chapter.
22	46	21	
23	47	22	
24	2	20	The duties of Elders in the church and specifics of baptism elaborated in D&C.
25	9	24	
26	48	25	
27	49	26	
28	50	27	Additional material in D&C constitutes more than half of this section. D&C includes new passages about Joseph Smith being visited by Elijah, Elias (who is separate from Elijah in Mormonism), Peter, James, John, Archangel Michael (who is Adam in Mormonism), and others. This chapter has the most controversial difference between the Book of Commandments and the Doctrine and Covenants.
29	10	29	
30	51	28	
31-33	52	30	Short revelations to David Whitmer, Peter Whitmer Jr. and John Whitmer combined into one chapter. It concerns missionary work to the "Lamanites"
34	53	31	
35	55	33	
36	56	34	
37	11	35	
38	57	36	
39	58	37	
40	12	38	
41	59	39	
42	60	40	
43	61	41	
44	13	42	This chapter was combined with chapter 47 in D&C.
45	14	43	
46	62	44	
47	13	42	This chapter appended to chapter 44 to become one section of D&C.
48	15	45	
49	16	46	
50	63	47	
51	64	48	
52	65	49	
53	17	50	
54	66	52	Two sections of the 1835 D&C were inadvertently numbered 66. Thus there were actually 103 sections (although they only numbered to 102).
55	66	53	Two sections of the 1835 D&C were inadvertently numbered 66. Thus there were actually 103 sections (although they only numbered to 102).
56	67	54	
57	68	55	
58	69	56	
59	18	58	
60	19	59	
61	70	60	
62	71	61	
63	72	62	
64	20	63	
65	21	64	This chapter of the Book of Commandments incomplete when the press was destroyed.
