= List of code names in the Doctrine and Covenants =

The original 1835 edition of the Doctrine and Covenants, a book of LDS scripture, used code names for certain people and places. These names appear only in seven of the book's sections, mainly those dealing with the United Order (or United Firm). It is believed that their purpose was to avoid the use of these sections in lawsuits by opponents of the Church, since giving the real names might have provided evidence that the United Order was legally a company, with its members financially liable for each other and the whole Order.

The substituted names appear in sections 78, 82, 92, 96, 103, 104, and 105. The earliest is dated 1 March 1832, the last is dated 22 June 1834. All except 103 and 105 were printed in the 1835 edition, and all seven appear in the editions published from 1844 to 1869 with the pseudonyms alone printed. In the 1876 and 1921 LDS editions, the real names were published in parentheses following the code names, and the 1981 LDS edition printed only the real names. The Community of Christ edition still uses the code names, with a key to their identities suggested in the section headings.

== Code names for people ==
- Ahashdah: Newel K. Whitney
- Alam: Edward Partridge
- Baneemy: originally Lyman Wight, reinterpreted by Orson Pratt as "mine elders" in 1876, perhaps corrupt Hebrew for “my sons”; also claimed as a title by Charles B. Thompson
- Baurak Ale: Joseph Smith. Possibly Hebrew for barakh 'el (ברך אל) “blessed [of] El,” i.e., God.
- Enoch: Joseph Smith
- Gazelam: Joseph Smith (cf. Gazelem)
- Horah: John Whitmer
- Mahalaleel: Algernon Sidney Gilbert
- Mehemson: Martin Harris
- Olihah: Oliver Cowdery (see -ihah)
- Pelagoram: Sidney Rigdon
- Shalemanasseh: William Wines Phelps (cf. Shalmaneser, Manasseh)
- Shederlaomach: Frederick G. Williams (cf. Chedorlaomer, Shedolamak)
- Zombre: John Johnson

== Other code words ==
- Cainhannoch: New York (cf. Enoch son of Cain)
- Lane-shine-house: printing office
- Ozondah: mercantile store
- Shinehah: Kirtland, Ohio (a word for the sun used in the Book of Abraham see also -hah)
- Shinelah: print
- Shinelane: printing
- Shule: ashery
- Tahhanes: tannery (cf. Tahpanhes)
- United Firm: United Order
