= Lectures on Faith =

Religious text of the Latter-day Saint movement

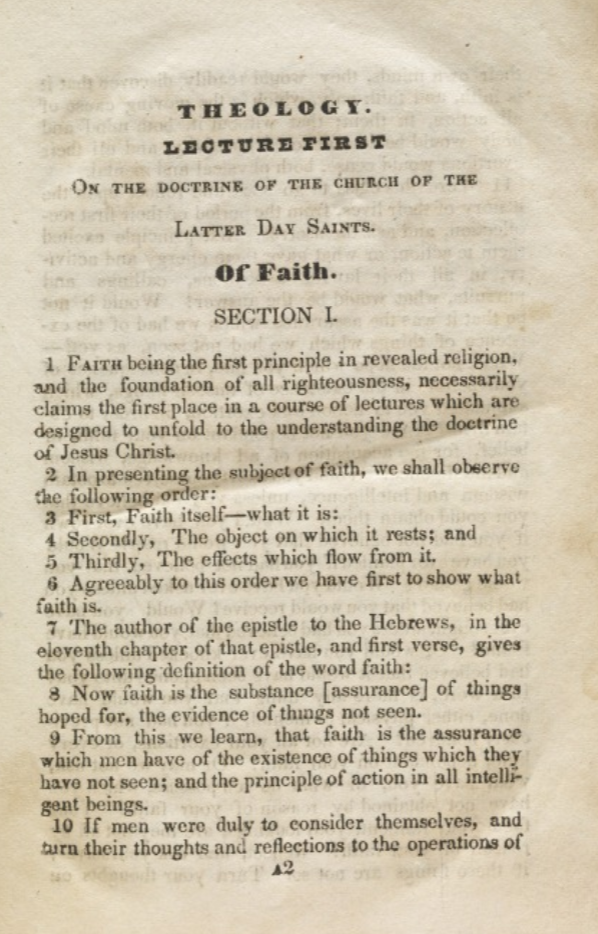
- First page, as published in the 1835 edition
- Book: Doctrine and Covenants
- Category: Doctrine

"Lectures on Faith" is a set of seven lectures on the doctrine and theology of the Church of Jesus Christ of Latter Day Saints, first published as the doctrine portion of the 1835 edition of the canonical Doctrine and Covenants (D&C), but later removed from that work by both major branches of the faith. The lectures were originally presented by Joseph Smith to a group of elders in a course known as the "School of the Prophets" in the early winter of 1834–35 in Kirtland, Ohio.

== Authorship ==
Although authorship of the lectures is uncertain, studies suggest that the actual wording was largely by Sidney Rigdon, with substantial involvement and approval by Smith and possibly others. Smith was involved, both in their authorship in November 1834 and in their later preparation for publication in January 1835.

The original title of each lecture was "Of Faith". It was not until 1876, in an edition of the D&C edited by Church Historian, Orson Pratt, of the Quorum of the Twelve Apostles of the Church of Jesus Christ of Latter-day Saints (LDS Church), that the title was given as "Lectures on Faith".

== Key lecture points ==
=== Lecture 1 ===
Faith gives rise to all human endeavors in both worldly and spiritual matters, and is a source of power, both in man and in God.

=== Lecture 2 ===
The human family's knowledge of God began with God's interaction with Adam before The Fall, which knowledge was retained after The Fall, and which knowledge has been transmitted via human testimony among Adam's descendants. Although people since Adam have had to rely on human testimony to learn about God, God can choose to reveal himself directly (as he did to Adam) to those who live a life of devout prayer and service to God.

=== Lecture 3 ===
In addition to a belief in God, a correct knowledge of God's character and attributes as revealed in scripture is necessary for the exercise of faith leading to life and salvation. Effective faith requires the following understanding of God's characteristics:

- That He was God before the world was created, and the same God that he was after the world was created;
- That God is merciful and gracious, slow to anger, abundant in goodness, and that He was so from everlasting, and will be so until everlasting;
- That God is unchanging;
- That He is a God of truth;
- That God is no respecter of persons;
- That God is love.

=== Lecture 4 ===
From scripture, one can learn that God possesses the following attributes: knowledge, faith (which is His power), justice, judgement, mercy, and truth. An explanation for why each attribute is necessary in order for mankind to be able to exercise productive faith is provided.

=== Lecture 5 ===
The Godhead, or the collective persons of the Father, the Son, and the Holy Spirit, is expounded upon:

1. The Godhead consists of the Father, Son and Holy Ghost (Lecture 5:1)
2. There are two "personages", the Father and the Son, that constitute the "supreme power over all things" (Lecture 5:2, Q&A section)
3. The Father is a "personage of spirit, glory, and power" (Lecture 5:2)
4. The Son is a "personage of tabernacle" (Lecture 5:2) who "possess[es] the same mind with the Father; which Mind is the Holy Spirit" (Lecture 5:2)
5. The Father, Son, and Holy Spirit constitute the "supreme power over all things" (Lecture 5:2)
6. "These three constitute the Godhead and are one: the Father and the Son possessing the same mind, the same wisdom, glory, power, and fullness;" (Lecture 5:2)
7. The Son is "filled with the fullness of the Mind of the Father, or in other words, the Spirit of the Father." (Lecture 5:2)

=== Lecture 6 ===
The knowledge that one's life is in accordance with God's will is necessary for obtaining eternal life. Any religion that does not require the sacrifice of all things, does not have the power to produce the faith necessary for life and salvation. Those who have not sacrificed all things will not be able to know that their lives are pleasing to God and will therefore not be able to have the faith to overcome the tribulations that stand in the way of becoming joint heirs with Christ in God's Kingdom.

=== Lecture 7 ===
By growing in faith, one draws nearer to God, and in the perfection of faith, one becomes like God. By faith, one obtains knowledge of God, through which knowledge one can receive all things pertaining to life and godliness.

== Status as part of the Latter Day Saint canon ==
The lectures were published in 1835 as the "Doctrine" portion of the volume entitled Doctrine and Covenants of the Church of the Latter Day Saints: Carefully Selected from the Revelations of God. The lectures were selected for that volume by a committee appointed on September 24, 1834, by a general assembly of the church to arrange the doctrines and revelations of the church into a single volume. That committee of Presiding Elders, consisting of Joseph Smith, Oliver Cowdery, Sidney Rigdon, and Frederick G. Williams, stated that the lectures were included "in consequence of their embracing the important doctrine of salvation," and that the lectures, together with the church-regulatory sections that followed, represent "our belief, and when we say this, humbly trust, the faith and principles of this society as a body." Accordingly, the church body accepted the committee's compilation on August 17, 1835, as "the doctrine and covenants of their faith, by a unanimous vote".

Some Latter Day Saint denominations have subsequently removed the lectures from the D&C. The lectures were removed from the Reorganized Church of Jesus Christ of Latter Day Saints version of the D&C in 1897, although that denomination began publishing the lectures in a separate volume in 1952. The LDS Church removed the lectures from the D&C in the 1921 edition, with an explanation that the lectures "were never presented to nor accepted by the Church as being otherwise than theological lectures or lessons". This is in contrast to the remaining pages of the original D&C, which are officially recognized by nearly all Latter Day Saint denominations as divine revelation given specifically to the church.

Mormon apologists give several reasons to explain why the Lectures were removed from the scriptural volumes of the LDS Church. According to church apostle Joseph Fielding Smith, the reasons were:

"(a) They were not received as revelations by the prophet Joseph Smith.
"(b) They are instructions relative to the general subject of faith. They are explanations of this principle but not doctrine.
"(c) They are not complete as to their teachings regarding the Godhead. More complete instructions on the point of doctrine are given in section 130 of the 1876 and all subsequent editions of the Doctrine and Covenants.
"(d) It was thought by James E. Talmage, chairman, and other members of the committee who were responsible for their omission that to avoid confusion and contention on this vital point of belief, it would be better not to have them bound in the same volume as the commandments or revelations which make up the Doctrine and Covenants."

Brigham Young University's Thomas G. Alexander has stated in a Sunstone article:

Revision [of the Doctrine and Covenants] continued through July and August 1921, and the Church printed the new edition in late 1921. The committee proposed to delete the 'Lectures on Faith' on the grounds that they were 'lessons prepared for use in the School of the Elders, conducted in Kirtland, Ohio, during the winter of 1834-35; but they were never presented to nor accepted by the Church as being otherwise than theological lectures or lessons.' How the committee came to this conclusion is uncertain. The general conference of the Church in April 1835 had accepted the entire volume, including the Lectures, not simply the portion entitled 'Covenants and Commandments,' as authoritative and binding upon Church members. What seems certain, however, is that the interpretive exegesis of 1916 based upon the reconstructed doctrine of the Godhead had superseded the Lectures.

Other commentators have theorized that the lectures represented official church doctrine in 1835, but that by 1897 or 1921, when the work was decanonized by the major Latter Day Saint denominations, the doctrine concerning the Godhead had changed, and the lectures were no longer generally consistent with accepted doctrines. For instance, in Lecture 5, paragraph 2, it defines the Father as a "personage of spirit, glory and power," whereas in section 130 of the D&C, verse 22 states that "the Father has a body of flesh and bones as tangible as man's." In addition, the Father and Son are said to possess the same mind, "which mind is the Holy Spirit" (Lecture 5, paragraph 2). The Holy Spirit is not a personage, as defined at the beginning of paragraph 2: "There are two personages who constitute the great, matchless, governing and supreme power over all things ... They are the Father and Son." This could cause confusion when compared with section 130 of the Doctrine and Covenants: "The Holy Ghost has not a body of flesh and bones, but is a personage of Spirit." Section 130 was added in the 1876 edition and hence co-existed with the Lectures on Faith.

In 1972, Bruce R. McConkie, then a member of the LDS Church's First Council of the Seventy, praised the lectures as follows:

"In my judgment, it is the most comprehensive, inspired utterance that now exists in the English language—that exists in one place defining, interpreting, expounding, announcing, and testifying what kind of being God is. It was written by the power of the Holy Ghost, by the spirit of inspiration. It is, in effect, eternal scripture; it is true."
