= Doctrine and Covenants =

Part of the scriptural canons of Latter Day Saint denominations

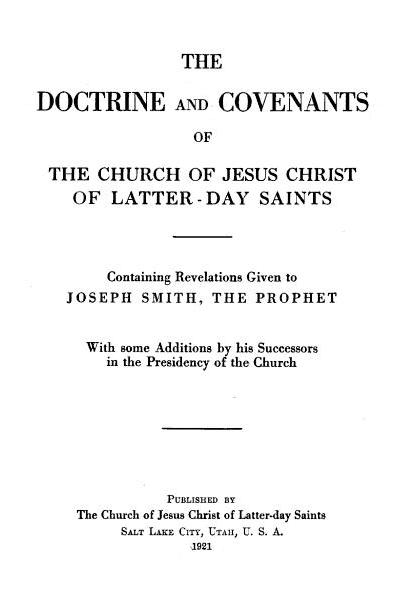

Information
- Religion: Latter Day Saint movement
- Language: English language
- Period: 1835–1978 LDS/2016 CoC
- Chapters: 138 LDS/165 CoC

The Doctrine and Covenants (sometimes abbreviated and cited as D&C or D. and C.) is a part of the open scriptural canon of several denominations of the Latter Day Saint movement. Originally published in 1835 as Doctrine and Covenants of the Church of the Latter Day Saints: Carefully Selected from the Revelations of God, editions of the book continue to be printed mainly by the Church of Jesus Christ of Latter-day Saints (LDS Church) and the Community of Christ (formerly the Reorganized Church of Jesus Christ of Latter Day Saints [RLDS Church]).

The book originally contained two parts: a sequence of lectures setting forth basic church doctrine, followed by a compilation of revelations, or "covenants" of the church: thus the name "Doctrine and Covenants". The "doctrine" portion of the book, however, has been removed by both the LDS Church and Community of Christ. The remaining portion of the book contains revelations on numerous topics, most of which were dictated by the movement's founder Joseph Smith, supplemented by materials periodically added by each denomination.

Controversy has existed between the two largest denominations of the Latter Day Saint movement over some sections added to the 1876 LDS edition, attributed to founder Smith. Whereas the LDS Church believes these sections to have been revelations to Smith, the RLDS Church traditionally disputed their authenticity.

== History ==
The Doctrine and Covenants was first published in 1835 as a later version of the Book of Commandments, which had been partially printed in 1833. This earlier book contained 65 early revelations to church leaders, notably Joseph Smith and Oliver Cowdery. Before many copies of the book could be printed, the printing press and most of the printed copies were destroyed by a mob in Missouri.

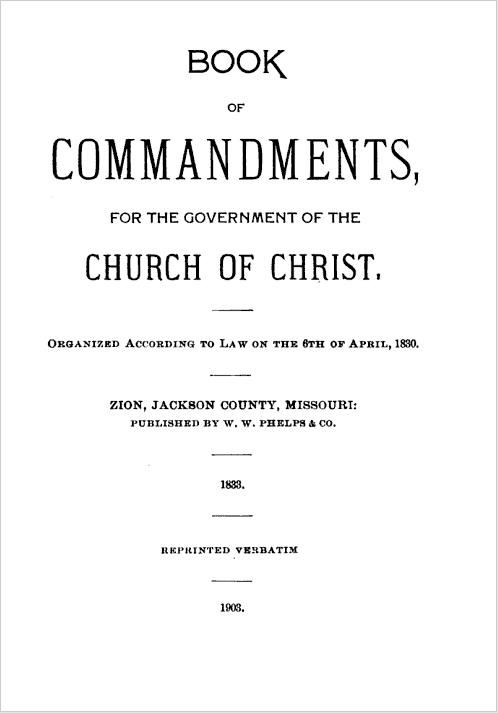
Title page of the 1903 reprint of the Book of Commandments.

On September 24, 1834, a committee was appointed by the general assembly of the church to organize a new volume containing the most significant revelations. This committee of Presiding Elders, consisting of Smith, Cowdery, Sidney Rigdon, and Frederick G. Williams, began to review and revise numerous revelations for inclusion in the new work. The committee eventually organized the book into two parts: a "Doctrine" part and a "Covenants" part.

The "Doctrine" part of the book consisted of a theological course now called the "Lectures on Faith". The lectures were a series of doctrinal courses used in the School of the Prophets which had recently been completed in Kirtland, Ohio. According to the committee, these lectures were included in the compilation "in consequence of their embracing the important doctrine of salvation." The "Covenants" part of the book, labeled "Covenants and Commandments of the Lord, to his servants of the church of the Latter Day Saints", contained a total of 103 revelations. These 103 revelations were said to "contain items or principles for the regulation of the church, as taken from the revelations which have been given since its organization, as well as from former ones." Each of the 103 revelations was assigned a "section number"; however, section 66 was mistakenly used twice. Thus, the sections of the original work were numbered only to 102.

On February 17, 1835, after the committee had selected the book's contents, the committee wrote that the resulting work represents "our belief, and when we say this, humbly trust, the faith and principles of this society as a body."

The book was first introduced to the church body in a general conference on August 17, 1835. Smith and Williams, two of the Presiding Elders on the committee, were absent, but Cowdery and Rigdon were present. The church membership at the time had not yet seen the Doctrine and Covenants manuscript as it had been compiled and revised solely by the committee; however, various church members who were familiar with the work "bore record" of the book's truth. At the end of the conference, the church "by a unanimous vote" agreed to accept the compilation as "the doctrine and covenants of their faith" and to make arrangements for its printing.

In 1835, the book was printed and published under the title Doctrine and Covenants of the Church of the Latter Day Saints: Carefully Selected from the Revelations of God.

A copy of the Doctrine and Covenants from NASA photographer M. Edward Thomas traveled to the moon and back in 1972 with astronaut John Young aboard Apollo 16.

== LDS Church editions ==
In the LDS Church, The Doctrine and Covenants of The Church of Jesus Christ of Latter-day Saints stands alongside the Bible, the Book of Mormon, and the Pearl of Great Price as scripture. Together the LDS Church's scriptures are referred to as the "standard works". The LDS Church's version of the Doctrine and Covenants is described by the church as "containing revelations given to Joseph Smith, the Prophet, with some additions by his successors in the Presidency of the Church."

=== Sections Included in LDS edition ===
The 138 sections and two official declarations in LDS Church's Doctrine and Covenants break down as follows:

- Sections 1–134, 137: From the presidency of Joseph Smith (1828–44)
- Sections 135–136: During the administration of the Quorum of the Twelve (1844–47)
- Official Declaration 1: From the presidency of Wilford Woodruff (1889–98)
- Section 138: From the presidency of Joseph F. Smith (1901–18)
- Official Declaration 2: From the presidency of Spencer W. Kimball (1973–85)

The following sections consist of letters, reports, statements, and other similar documents: 102, 123, 127–131, 134, 135, and Official Declarations 1 and 2.

=== 1844 Edition ===
In 1844, the church added eight sections not included in the 1835 edition. In the current edition, these added sections are numbered 103, 105, 112, 119, 124, 127, 128, and 135.

=== 1876 Edition ===
In 1876, a new LDS Church edition renumbered most of the sections in a roughly chronological order instead of the earlier topical order, and included 26 sections not included in previous editions, now numbered as sections 2, 13, 77, 85, 87, 108–111, 113–118, 120–123, 125, 126, 129–132, and 136. Previous editions had been divided into verses with the early versifications generally following the paragraph structure of the original text. It was with the 1876 edition that the currently used versification was first employed.

In 1876, section 101 from the 1835 edition (and subsequent printings) was removed. Section 101 was a "Statement on Marriage" as adopted by an 1835 conference of the church, and contained the following text:

Inasmuch as this Church of Christ has been reproached with the crime of fornication and polygamy, we declare that we believe that one man should have one wife, and one woman but one husband, except in the case of death, when either is at liberty to marry again.

This section was removed because it had been superseded by section 132 of the modern LDS edition, recorded in 1843, which contains a revelation received by Joseph Smith on eternal marriage and plural marriage, the origin of the principles of which the LDS Church traces to as early as 1831.

During the 1880s, five foreign editions contained two revelations to John Taylor that were received in 1882 and 1883; these revelations "set in order" the priesthood, gave more clarification about the roles of priesthood offices—especially the seventy—and required "men who ... preside over my priesthood" to live plural marriage in order to qualify to hold their church positions. Due to the LDS Church's change in attitude to polygamy in 1890, these sections were not included in future English editions of the Doctrine and Covenants.

=== 1921 Edition ===
In 1921, the LDS Church removed the "Lectures on Faith" portion of the book, with an explanation that the lectures "were never presented to nor accepted by the Church as being otherwise than theological lectures or lessons". The lectures contain theology concerning the Godhead and emphasize the importance of faith and works.

=== Latter-day Revelation ===
In 1930, a small volume edited by apostle James E. Talmage titled Latter-day Revelation: Selections from the Book of Doctrine and Covenants was published, which was a highly edited selective version of the Doctrine and Covenants printed in paragraph format rather than verses. Talmage wrote that the book's purpose was "to make the strictly doctrinal parts of the Doctrine and Covenants of easy access and reduce its bulk" by including only "the sections comprising scriptures of general and enduring value". Ninety-five of the sections of the Doctrine and Covenants were completely omitted—most notably section 132 on plural and celestial marriage—along with parts of 21 others. Twenty complete sections were retained along with parts of 21 others. Fundamentalist Mormons were offended, particularly at the exclusion of section 132, and accused the church of "changing the scriptures." As a result, church president Heber J. Grant ordered the withdrawal of the book from sale with the remaining copies shredded in order to "avoid further conflict with the fundamentalists".

Sections included in Talmage's Latter-day Revelation
| Section | Complete or Omissions? | Description |
|---|---|---|
| Section 1 | Complete | The Voice of the Lord to all People |
| Section 2 | Complete | Predicted Advent of Elijah the Prophet |
| Section 4 | Complete | Qualifications for the Ministry |
| Section 7 | Complete | Desire of John the Apostle Granted |
| Section 13 | Complete | Restoration of the Aaronic Priesthood |
| Section 18 | Omissions | Calling of the Twelve Directed |
| Section 19 | Omissions | Christ Victorious and Omnipotent |
| Section 20 | Omissions | Fundamental Principles and Ordinances |
| Section 22 | Complete | A New and Everlasting Covenant |
| Section 27 | Complete | Sacramental Emblems and the Future Communion |
| Section 29 | Complete | Tribulation and Judgment |
| Section 38 | Complete | Diligence Enjoined |
| Section 42 | Omissions | Law and Order in the Church |
| Section 43 | Omissions | In Preparation for the Lord's Coming |
| Section 45 | Omissions | As the Lord Spake So He Speaks |
| Section 46 | Complete | Gifts of the Spirit |
| Section 50 | Omissions | Discernment of Spirits |
| Section 56 | Omissions | Woes and Blessings |
| Section 58 | Omissions | Commandment and Obedience |
| Section 59 | Complete | Commendation and Further Promise |
| Section 63 | Omissions | Calamities to Befall the Wicked |
| Section 64 | Omissions | Forgiveness and Sacrifice Required |
| Section 65 | Complete | Kingdom of God and Kingdom of Heaven |
| Section 68 | Omissions | To Elders and Parents Especially |
| Section 76 | Complete | Perdition and Graded Kingdoms of Glory |
| Section 84 | Omissions | On Priesthood |
| Section 87 | Complete | Prophecy on War |
| Section 88 | Omissions | The Olive Leaf |
| Section 89 | Complete | The Word of Wisdom |
| Section 98 | Omissions | Divine and Secular Law |
| Section 101 | Omissions | Encouragement and Assurance |
| Section 107 | Complete | Orders and Offices of the Priesthood |
| Section 110 | Complete | A Glorious Theophany Followed By Visitations of Ancient Prophets |
| Section 119 | Complete | The Law of the Tithe |
| Section 121 | Omissions | Many Called but Few Chosen |
| Section 124 | Omissions | Commandment to Build a House of the Lord |
| Section 130 | Omissions | An Irrevocable Law. The Holy Trinity |
| Section 131 | Omissions | Matter and Spirit |
| Section 133 | Complete | Imminence of the Lord's Coming |
| Section 134 | Complete | Church and State |

=== 1981 Edition ===
Sections 137 and 138 were added to the LDS Church's 1981 edition of the Doctrine and Covenants. These were accounts of two visions, one from Joseph Smith in 1837 and the other from his nephew, Joseph F. Smith, in 1918. The revelations were earlier accepted as scripture when added to the Pearl of Great Price in April 1976. No new revelatory sections have been added since 1981.

The LDS Church's 1981 edition contains two "Official Declarations" at the book's conclusion. The 1890 Official Declaration 1 ended the church-authorized practice of plural marriage, and the 1978 Official Declaration 2 announces the opening of priesthood ordination to all worthy male members without regard to race or color. The two Official Declarations are not revelations, but they serve as the formal announcements that a revelation was received. In neither case is the revelation included in the Doctrine and Covenants. The text of Official Declaration 1 has been included in every LDS Church printing of the Doctrine and Covenants since 1908.

Until 1981, editions of the book used code names for certain people and places in those sections that dealt with the United Order. The 1981 LDS edition replaced these with the real names, relegating the code names to footnotes. The Community of Christ edition still uses the code names.

=== 2013 Edition and 2025 adjustments ===
A new edition was released in 2013, which is the edition currently in use by the church. Changes included adjustments and corrections to the book's introduction and seventy-eight section introductions. The changes reflect the modern scholarship that came from The Joseph Smith Papers.

In 2025, additional adjustments were made to the headings of twenty-five sections. These changes likewise came because of additional scholarship from the Joseph Smith Papers project.

== Community of Christ editions ==
Officials of the Community of Christ (formerly known as the Reorganized Church of Jesus Christ of Latter Day Saints [RLDS Church]) first published an edition of the Doctrine and Covenants in 1864, based on the previous 1844 edition. A general conference of the church in 1878 approved a resolution that declared that the revelations of the Prophet-President Joseph Smith III had equal standing to those previously included in the work. Since that time, the church has continued to add sections to its edition of the Doctrine and Covenants, containing the revelations of succeeding Prophet-Presidents. The most recent addition was formally authorized on April 14, 2010, after being presented to the church for informal consideration on January 17, 2010. The numbers of the sections and versification differ from the edition published by the LDS Church and both modern editions differ from the original 1835 edition numeration.

=== Sections added to the Community of Christ edition ===
The 167 sections of the Community of Christ's Doctrine and Covenants break down as follows:

- Sections 1–113 (includes 108A): From the presidency of Joseph Smith (1828–44)
- Sections 114–131: From the presidency of Joseph Smith III (1860–1914)
- Sections 132–138: From the presidency of Frederick M. Smith (1914–46)
- Sections 139–144: From the presidency of Israel A. Smith (1946–58)
- Sections 145–152 (includes 149A): From the presidency of W. Wallace Smith (1958–78)
- Sections 153–160: From the presidency of Wallace B. Smith (1978–96)
- Sections 161–162: From the presidency of W. Grant McMurray (1996–2004)
- Sections 163–165: From the presidency of Stephen M. Veazey (2005–2025)

The following sections are not revelations, but letters, reports, statements, and other similar documents: 99, 108A, 109–113, and 123.

Based on the above, the number of revelations (accounting for sections that are not revelations) presented by each Community of Christ president, are as follows:

- Joseph Smith: 107
- Joseph Smith III: 17
- Frederick M. Smith: 7
- Israel A. Smith: 6
- W. Wallace Smith: 9
- Wallace B. Smith: 8
- W. Grant McMurray: 2
- Stephen M. Veazey: 3
- Stassi D. Cramm: 0

=== Portions removed from the Community of Christ edition ===
The Community of Christ removed the "Lectures on Faith" in 1897. The 1970 World Conference concluded that several sections that had been added between the 1835 and 1844 editions—mainly dealing with the subjects of temple worship and baptism for the dead—had been published without proper approval of a church conference. As a result, the World Conference removed sections 107, 109, 110, 113, and 123 to a historical appendix, which also includes documents that were never published as sections. Of these, only section 107 was a revelation. The World Conference of 1990 subsequently removed the entire appendix from the Doctrine and Covenants. Section 108A contained the minutes of a business meeting, which, because of its historical nature, was moved to the Introduction in the 1970s. After 1990, the Introduction was updated, and what was section 108A was removed entirely.

==== Developments in 2023 and 2024 ====
A proposal to decanonize section 116 and move it to historical records was debated at the 2023 World Conference, which voted to refer the issue to the First Presidency. Section 116 had been received by Joseph Smith III in 1865, shortly after the conclusion of the American Civil War, and stipulates that men of all ethnic backgrounds should be ordained (contrast the LDS Church policy at the time forbidding Black ordination), but hedges this with caution against taking a "hasty" or indiscriminate attitude in ordination of men of the "Negro race", noting that many of the existing priesthood holders had failed to adequately fulfill their responsibilities. After consulting with Black priesthood members, the First Presidency decided to retain it, so as not to appear to be sanitising the church's history.

The Diversity and Inclusion team and the Church History and Sacred Story team were opposed to removing the section, arguing that it represented an important historical step towards inclusivity. The Church History and Sacred Story team, moreover, opined that the removal of sections 107, 109, 110, 113, and 123 had been a "mistake" based on "naive misunderstandings" of scripture and revelation, arguing that many other scriptural texts contain sexist, racist and violent language as a result of the backgrounds and biases of the writers, and that responsible interpretation of scripture needs to take this into account when seeking to discern God's will.

The outcome of the process was a rewritten section preface, giving better historical context and stipulating the overarching interpretation "to ordain people of all ethnicities while emphasizing careful discernment of calling, commitment and timing (compare to 156:9d)", and a minor re-versification, making the closing sentence ("Be ye content, I the Lord have spoken it.") a separate verse (D&C 116:5) to more accurately reflect the paragraph breaks in the earliest manuscripts of the section, and clarify that it applies to the section as a whole, rather than specifically to the caution against "hasty" ordination.

=== Doctrinal developments in the Community of Christ edition ===
The ongoing additions to the Community of Christ edition provide a record of the leadership changes and doctrinal developments within the denomination. When W. Grant McMurray became Prophet-President, he declared that instruction specific to leadership changes would no longer be included, so that the focus of the work could be more doctrinal in nature, and less administrative. The record of these leadership changes are still maintained in the form of published "letters of counsel." Prophet-President Stephen M. Veazey has conformed to this pattern. Although these letters are not formally published in the Doctrine and Covenants, they are still deemed to be inspired, and are dealt with in the same manner that revelations are (that is, they must be deliberated and approved by the voting members of a World Conference).

A modern revelation that resulted in some "disaffection" and "led to intense conflict in scattered areas of the RLDS Church" is contained in the Community of Christ version's section 156, presented by Prophet–President Wallace B. Smith and added in 1984, which called for the ordination of women to the priesthood and set out the primary purpose of temples to be "the pursuit of peace". A resulting schism over the legitimacy of these change led to the formation of the Restoration Branches movement, the Restoration Church of Jesus Christ of Latter Day Saints and the Remnant Church of Jesus Christ of Latter Day Saints.

While some of the prose in the new revelations seems designed to guide the denomination on matters of church governance and doctrine, others are seen as inspirational. One such example can be cited from section 161, presented as counsel to the church by W. Grant McMurray in 1996: "Become a people of the Temple—those who see violence but proclaim peace, who feel conflict yet extend the hand of reconciliation, who encounter broken spirits and find pathways for healing."

== Editions used by other denominations ==
The Church of Jesus Christ of Latter Day Saints (Strangite) uses the 1846 edition that was published in Nauvoo, Illinois; this version is virtually identical to the 1844 edition. Most recently a facsimile reprint was produced for the church at Voree, Wisconsin by Richard Drew in 1993.

The Church of Christ (Temple Lot) contends that the thousands of changes made to the original revelations as published in the Book of Commandments (including the change of the church's name) are not doctrinal and result from Joseph Smith's fall from his original calling. As a result, the Church of Christ (Temple Lot) prefers to use reprints of the Book of Commandments text.

The Church of Jesus Christ (Cutlerite) accepts the 1844 edition of the Doctrine and Covenants, including the Lectures on Faith, which it insists are as much inspired as the revelations themselves.

The Restoration Branches generally use the older RLDS Church Doctrine and Covenants, typically sections 1–144.

The Remnant Church of Jesus Christ of Latter Day Saints uses the older RLDS Church version of the Doctrine and Covenants up to section 144, and also 19 new revelations from their previous president, Frederick Niels Larsen.

"Remnant" movement, a spiritual movement in schism with the LDS Church, published an online "Restoration" edition of the Doctrine and Covenants in 2017. It includes any sections authored by Joseph Smith. It also: includes a new version of D&C 54, as revised by Denver Snuffer; excludes the Kirtland Temple visitation by Elijah and other angelic beings in D&C 110; excludes portions based on fragmentary teachings by Smith in D&C 129; includes Smith's Lectures on Faith; and includes a new appendix titled, "A Prophet’s Prerogative," by Jeff Savage.

== Chart comparison of editions ==
The following chart compares the current editions of the Doctrine and Covenants used by the LDS Church (LDS ed.) and Community of Christ (CofC ed.) with the 1833 Book of Commandments (BofC), the 1835 edition published in Kirtland, and the 1844 edition published in Nauvoo. Unless otherwise specified, the document is styled a "revelation" of the person delivering it.

| LDS ed. | CofC ed. | BofC (1833) | Kirtland ed. (1835) | Nauvoo ed. (1844) | Date | Delivered by | Description |
|---|---|---|---|---|---|---|---|
| 1 | 1 | 1 | 1 | 1 | 1 Nov 1831 | Joseph Smith | Lord's "Preface" |
| 2 | – | – | – | – | 21 Sep 1823 | Joseph Smith (angelic visitation) | Moroni's visit to Joseph Smith |
| 3 | 2 | 2 | 30 | 30 | Jul 1828 | Joseph Smith | lost 116 pages |
| 4 | 4 | 3 | 31 | 31 | Feb 1829 | Joseph Smith | To Joseph Smith, Sr. |
| 5 | 5 | 4 | 32 | 32 | Mar 1829 | Joseph Smith | To Martin Harris; golden plates |
| 6 | 6 | 5 | 8 | 8 | Apr 1829 | Joseph Smith and Oliver Cowdery | To Oliver Cowdery |
| 7 | 7 | 6 | 33 | 33 | Apr 1829 | Joseph Smith and Oliver Cowdery | To Joseph Smith, Oliver Cowdery; the Account of John |
| 8 | 8 | 7 | 34 | 34 | Apr 1829 | Joseph Smith | To Oliver Cowdery; Book of Mormon translation |
| 9 | 9 | 8 | 35 | 35 | Apr 1829 | Joseph Smith | To Oliver Cowdery; Book of Mormon translation |
| 10 | 3 | 9 | 36 | 36 | Apr 1829 (suspected; possibly earlier) | Joseph Smith | lost 116 pages |
| 11 | 10 | 10 | 37 | 37 | May 1829 | Joseph Smith | To Hyrum Smith |
| 12 | 11 | 11 | 38 | 38 | May 1829 | Joseph Smith | To Joseph Knight, Sr. |
| 13 | – | – | – | – | 15 May 1829 | Joseph Smith and Oliver Cowdery (angelic visitation) | Conferral of Aaronic priesthood by John the Baptist |
| 14 | 12 | 12 | 39 | 39 | Jun 1829 | Joseph Smith | To David Whitmer |
| 15 | 13 | 13 | 40 | 40 | Jun 1829 | Joseph Smith | To John Whitmer |
| 16 | 14 | 14 | 41 | 41 | Jun 1829 | Joseph Smith | To Peter Whitmer, Jr. |
| 17 | 15 | – | 42 | 42 | Jun 1829 | Joseph Smith | To Three Witnesses |
| 18 | 16 | 15 | 43 | 43 | Jun 1829 | Joseph Smith, Oliver Cowdery, and David Whitmer | selection of Twelve Apostles |
| 19 | 18 | 16 | 44 | 44 | Summer 1829 | Joseph Smith | To Martin Harris |
| 20 | 17 | 24 | 2 | 2 | Summer 1829 (received); 6 Apr 1830 (recorded and finalized) | Joseph Smith | Church organization and government |
| 21 | 19 | 22 | 46 | 46 | 6 Apr 1830 | Joseph Smith | Joseph Smith's calling |
| 22 | 20 | 23 | 47 | 47 | 16 Apr 1830 | Joseph Smith | baptism |
| 23 | 21 | 17–21 | 45 | 45 | Apr 1830 | Joseph Smith | To Oliver Cowdery, Hyrum Smith, Samuel H. Smith, Joseph Smith, Sr., Joseph Knight, Sr. |
| 24 | 23 | 25 | 9 | 9 | Jul 1830 | Joseph Smith and Oliver Cowdery | Callings of Joseph Smith and Oliver Cowdery |
| 25 | 24 | 26 | 48 | 48 | Jul 1830 | Joseph Smith | To Emma Smith; compilation of a church hymnal |
| 26 | 25 | 27 | 49 | 49 | Jul 1830 | Joseph Smith, Oliver Cowdery, and John Whitmer | Common consent |
| 27 | 26 | 28 | 50 | 50 | Aug 1830 | Joseph Smith | Sacrament and priesthood ordinations |
| 28 | 27 | 30 | 51 | 51 | Sep 1830 | Joseph Smith | To Oliver Cowdery; Joseph Smith to receive revelations until another appointed |
| 29 | 28 | 29 | 10 | 10 | Sep 1830 | Joseph Smith | To six elders; Second Coming; origin of Satan; redemption of children |
| 30 | 29 | 31–33 | 52 | 52 | Sep 1830 | Joseph Smith | To David Whitmer, Peter Whitmer, Jr., John Whitmer |
| 31 | 30 | 34 | 53 | 53 | Sep 1830 | Joseph Smith | To Thomas B. Marsh |
| 32 | 31 | – | 54 | 54 | Oct 1830 | Joseph Smith | To Parley P. Pratt and Ziba Peterson |
| 33 | 32 | 35 | 55 | 55 | Oct 1830 | Joseph Smith | To Ezra Thayre and Northrop Sweet |
| 34 | 33 | 36 | 56 | 56 | 4 Nov 1830 | Joseph Smith | To Orson Pratt |
| 35 | 34 | 37 | 11 | 11 | 7 Dec 1830 | Joseph Smith and Sidney Rigdon | Callings Joseph Smith and Sidney Rigdon; signs and miracles; the elect |
| 36 | 35 | 38 | 57 | 57 | 9 Dec 1830 | Joseph Smith | To Edward Partridge |
| 37 | 37 | 39 | 58 | 58 | Dec 1830 | Joseph Smith and Sidney Rigdon | Saints to gather in Ohio |
| 38 | 38 | 40 | 12 | 12 | 2 Jan 1831 | Joseph Smith | equality; wars |
| 39 | 39 | 41 | 59 | 59 | 5 Jan 1831 | Joseph Smith | To James Covel |
| 40 | 40 | 42 | 60 | 60 | 6 Jan 1831 | Joseph Smith and Sidney Rigdon | Concerning James Covel |
| 41 | 41 | 43 | 61 | 61 | 4 Feb 1831 | Joseph Smith | To the church; Edward Partridge called as bishop |
| 42 | 42 | 44, 47 | 13 | 13 | 9, 23 Feb 1831 | Joseph Smith | "The Laws of the Church of Christ"; explanation of the United Order |
| 43 | 43 | 45 | 14 | 14 | Feb 1831 | Joseph Smith | Role of President of the Church; missionary work; forces of nature |
| 44 | 44 | 46 | 62 | 62 | Feb 1831 (latter part) | Joseph Smith and Sidney Rigdon | Church conference called |
| 45 | 45 | 48 | 15 | 15 | 7 Mar 1831 | Joseph Smith | Matthew chapter 24 explained; missionary work; Christ as advocate |
| 46 | 46 | 49 | 16 | 16 | 8 Mar 1831 | Joseph Smith | Sacrament meeting, gifts of the Spirit |
| 47 | 47 | 50 | 63 | 63 | 8 Mar 1831 | Joseph Smith | John Whitmer to keep history of church |
| 48 | 48 | 51 | 64 | 64 | 10 Mar 1831 | Joseph Smith | Purchase of lands |
| 49 | 49 | 52 | 65 | 65 | 7 May 1831 | Joseph Smith | To Joseph Smith, Sidney Rigdon, Parley P. Pratt, and Leman Copley; Shaker beliefs |
| 50 | 50 | 53 | 17 | 17 | 9 May 1831 | Joseph Smith | Recognizing the Spirit |
| 51 | 51 | – | 23 | 23 | 20 May 1831 | Joseph Smith | Property division |
| 52 | 52 | 54 | 66 | 66 | 6 Jun 1831 | Joseph Smith | Sending elders to Missouri |
| 53 | 53 | 55 | 66 (Note: This section was mistakenly numbered LXVI, the same as the previous section. This numbering error was corrected in the Nauvoo edition, thus changing the number of all subsequent sections.) | 67 | 8 Jun 1831 | Joseph Smith | To Algernon Sidney Gilbert |
| 54 | 54 | 56 | 67 | 68 | 10 Jun 1831 | Joseph Smith | To Newel Knight |
| 55 | 55 | 57 | 68 | 69 | 14 Jun 1831 | Joseph Smith | To W. W. Phelps |
| 56 | 56 | 58 | 69 | 70 | 15 Jun 1831 | Joseph Smith | The rebellious; the rich and the poor |
| 57 | 57 | – | 27 | 27 | 20 Jul 1831 | Joseph Smith | Location of Zion at Jackson County, Missouri |
| 58 | 58 | 59 | 18 | 18 | 1 Aug 1831 | Joseph Smith | Tribulations; gather to Zion |
| 59 | 59 | 60 | 19 | 19 | 7 Aug 1831 | Joseph Smith | The sabbath; reward for the righteous |
| 60 | 60 | 61 | 70 | 71 | 8 Aug 1831 | Joseph Smith | Elders to travel to Cincinnati, Ohio; missionary work |
| 61 | 61 | 62 | 71 | 72 | 12 Aug 1831 | Joseph Smith | "Destruction upon the waters" |
| 62 | 62 | 63 | 72 | 73 | 13 Aug 1831 | Joseph Smith | Missionary work |
| 63 | 63 | 64 | 20 | 20 | 30 Aug 1831 | Joseph Smith | Signs; mysteries; impending war and woe; gather to Zion; authority to use Lord's name |
| 64 | 64 | 65 (Note: Incomplete; due to the loss of printed pages, all copies of the Book of Commandments end in the middle of this revelation.) | 21 | 21 | 11 Sep 1831 | Joseph Smith | Forgiveness; financial debt; tithing; Zion to flourish |
| 65 | 65 | – | 24 | 24 | 30 Oct 1831 | Joseph Smith (prayer) | Prayer of Joseph Smith; keys of the kingdom |
| 66 | 66 | – | 74 | 75 | 29 Oct 1831 | Joseph Smith | To William E. McLellin |
| 67 | 67 | – | 25 | 25 | early Nov 1831 | Joseph Smith | Testimony of the Book of Commandments |
| 68 | 68 | – | 22 | 22 | 1 Nov 1831 | Joseph Smith | To Orson Hyde, Luke S. Johnson, Lyman E. Johnson, and William E. McLellin; bishops; parents |
| 69 | 69 | – | 28 | 28 | 11 Nov 1831 | Joseph Smith | Assignments for John Whitmer |
| 70 | 70 | – | 26 | 26 | 12 Nov 1831 | Joseph Smith | Stewardship; equality |
| 71 | 71 | – | 90 | 91 | 1 Dec 1831 | Joseph Smith and Sidney Rigdon | Joseph Smith and Sidney Rigdon called to preach |
| 72 | 72 | – | 89 | 90 | 4 Dec 1831 | Joseph Smith | Bishops |
| 73 | 73 | – | 29 | 29 | 10 Jan 1832 | Joseph Smith and Sidney Rigdon | Joseph Smith Translation of the Bible |
| 74 | 74 | – | 73 | 74 | 1830 (month unknown) | Joseph Smith | Explanation of 1 Corinthians 7:14; salvation of children |
| 75 | 75 | – | 87 | 88 | 25 Jan 1832 | Joseph Smith | Missionary work; families of missionaries |
| 76 | 76 | – | 91 | 92 | 16 Feb 1832 | Joseph Smith and Sidney Rigdon (vision) | Jesus Christ; resurrection; degrees of glory; origin of Satan; called "The Vision" |
| 77 (Note: Included in the first (1851) edition of the LDS Church’s Pearl of Great Price, as "A key to the revelations of St. John". Moved to the Doctrine and Covenants in 1876.) | – | – | – | – | Mar 1832 | Joseph Smith | Explanation of certain verses in Revelation |
| 78 | 77 | – | 75 | 76 | 1 Mar 1832 | Joseph Smith | United Order; equality |
| 79 | 78 | – | 76 | 77 | 12 Mar 1832 | Joseph Smith | To Jared Carter |
| 80 | 79 | – | 77 | 78 | 7 Mar 1832 | Joseph Smith | To Stephen Burnett and Eden Smith |
| 81 | 80 | – | 79 | 80 | 15 Mar 1832 | Joseph Smith | To Jesse Gause; on 18 Mar 1833 its application was transferred to Frederick G. Williams |
| 82 | 81 | – | 86 | 87 | 26 Apr 1832 | Joseph Smith | Obedience; United Order; equality |
| 83 | 82 | – | 88 | 89 | 30 Apr 1832 | Joseph Smith | Husbands and fathers; widows and orphans |
| 84 (Note: The words "wo unto" in verse 42 do not appear in the Community of Christ edition, nor in the original 1835 edition.) | 83 | – | 4 | 4 | 22–23 Sep 1832 | Joseph Smith | Priesthood |
| 85 | – | – | – | – | 27 Nov 1832 | Joseph Smith (letter) | Letter from Joseph Smith to W. W. Phelps; United Order; One Mighty and Strong; equality |
| 86 | 84 | – | 6 | 6 | 6 Dec 1832 | Joseph Smith | Parable of the Tares explained |
| 87 (Note: Included in the first (1851) edition of the LDS Church’s Pearl of Great Price, as "A revelation and prophecy by the prophet, seer, and revelator, Joseph Smith". Moved to the Doctrine and Covenants in 1876.) | – | – | – | – | 25 Dec 1832 | Joseph Smith | Prophecy of war and calamity |
| 88 | 85 | – | 7 | 7 | 27–28 Dec 1832; 3 Jan 1833 | Joseph Smith | The "olive leaf"; "Lord's message of peace" |
| 89 | 86 | – | 80 | 81 | 27 Feb 1833 | Joseph Smith | A "Word of wisdom" |
| 90 | 87 | – | 84 | 85 | 8 Mar 1833 | Joseph Smith | Keys of the kingdom; First Presidency |
| 91 | 88 | – | 92 | 93 | 9 Mar 1833 | Joseph Smith | The Apocrypha |
| 92 | 89 | – | 93 | 94 | 15 Mar 1833 | Joseph Smith | To Frederick G. Williams |
| 93 | 90 | – | 82 | 83 | 6 May 1833 | Joseph Smith | John's record of Christ; intelligence; innocence of children |
| 94 | 91 | – | 83 | 84 | 2 Aug 1833 | Joseph Smith | To Hyrum Smith, Reynolds Cahoon, and Jared Carter; construction of various buildings commanded |
| 95 | 92 | – | 95 | 96 | 1 Jun 1833 | Joseph Smith | Kirtland Temple to be built; purpose of temples |
| 96 | 93 | – | 96 | 97 | 4 Jun 1833 | Joseph Smith | Division of property |
| 97 | 94 | – | 81 | 82 | 2 Aug 1833 | Joseph Smith | Saints in Jackson County, Missouri; temple to be built in Jackson County |
| 98 | 95 | – | 85 | 86 | 6 Aug 1833 | Joseph Smith | Promises and warnings; martyrs; when war is justified; forgiving enemies |
| 99 | 96 | – | 78 | 79 | 29 Aug 1832 (Note: Some older LDS and RLDS editions mistakenly date this revelation to August 1833.) | Joseph Smith | To John Murdock |
| 100 | 97 | – | 94 | 95 | 12 Oct 1833 | Joseph Smith and Sidney Rigdon | Joseph Smith and Sidney Rigdon to preach gospel; Rigdon to be Smith's spokesman; welfare of Orson Hyde and John Gould |
| 101 | 98 | – | 97 | 98 | 16–17 Dec 1833 | Joseph Smith | Redemption of Zion; parables; United States and the U.S. Constitution; Saints to seek redress |
| 102 | 99 | – | 5 | 5 | 17 Feb 1834 | Oliver Cowdery and Orson Hyde (minutes of meeting) | Minutes for first high council meeting |
| 103 | 100 | – | – | 101 | 24 Feb 1834 | Joseph Smith | Redemption of Zion; organization of Zion's Camp |
| 104 | 101 | – | 98 | 99 | 23 Apr 1834 | Joseph Smith | United Order |
| 105 | 102 | – | – | 102 | 22 Jun 1834 | Joseph Smith | Redemption of Zion; purpose of Kirtland Temple; peace |
| 106 | 103 | – | 99 | 100 | 25 Nov 1834 | Joseph Smith | To Warren A. Cowdery; Second Coming |
| 107 | 104 | – | 3 | 3 | Apr 1835 (completed); some portions received 11 Nov 1831 | Joseph Smith | Priesthood; quorums |
| 108 | – | – | – | – | 26 Dec 1835 | Joseph Smith | To Lyman Sherman |
| 109 | – | – | – | – | 27 Mar 1836 | Joseph Smith (prayer) | Dedicatory prayer for Kirtland Temple |
| 110 | – | – | – | – | 3 Apr 1836 | Joseph Smith and Oliver Cowdery (vision and angelic visitations) | Visitation of Jesus Christ to accept Kirtland Temple; conferral of priesthood keys; coming of Moses, Elias, and Elijah |
| 111 | – | – | – | – | 6 Aug 1836 | Joseph Smith | temporal needs of the church |
| 112 | 105 | – | – | 104 | 23 Jul 1837 | Joseph Smith | To Thomas B. Marsh; Quorum of the Twelve Apostles; First Presidency |
| 113 | – | – | – | – | Mar 1838 | Joseph Smith (answers to questions) | Answers to questions on the Book of Isaiah |
| 114 | – | – | – | – | 11 Apr 1838 | Joseph Smith | Concerning David W. Patten |
| 115 | – | – | – | – | 26 Apr 1838 | Joseph Smith | Name of the church; stakes; temple to be built at Far West, Missouri |
| 116 | – | – | – | – | 19 May 1838 | Joseph Smith | Adam-ondi-Ahman |
| 117 | – | – | – | – | 8 Jul 1838 | Joseph Smith | Concerning William Marks, Newel K. Whitney, and Oliver Granger; property; sacrifice |
| 118 | – | – | – | – | 8 Jul 1838 | Joseph Smith | Vacancies in the Quorum of the Twelve Apostles filled |
| 119 | 106 | – | – | 107 | 8 Jul 1838 | Joseph Smith | Tithing |
| 120 | – | – | – | – | 8 Jul 1838 | Joseph Smith | Council on the Disposition of the Tithes |
| 121 | – | – | – | – | 20 Mar 1839 | Joseph Smith (prayer and prophecies) | Prayer and prophecies of Joseph Smith; why many are called but few chosen |
| 122 | – | – | – | – | 20 Mar 1839 | Joseph Smith | Destiny of Joseph Smith |
| 123 | – | – | – | – | 20 Mar 1839 | Joseph Smith (letter) | Letter to church; duty in relation to their persecutors |
| 124 | 107 (Note: Placed in the Appendix at the 1970 World Conference; the Appendix was removed completely by the 1990 World Conference.) | – | – | 103 | 19 Jan 1841 | Joseph Smith | Nauvoo Temple and Nauvoo House to be built; baptism for the dead |
| 125 | – | – | – | – | Mar 1841 | Joseph Smith | Saints in Iowa |
| 126 | – | – | – | – | 9 Jul 1841 | Joseph Smith | To Brigham Young |
| 127 | 109 | – | – | 105 | 1 Sep 1842 | Joseph Smith (letter) | Letter to church; baptism for the dead |
| 128 | 110 | – | – | 106 | 6 Sep 1842 | Joseph Smith (letter) | Letter to church; baptism for the dead |
| 129 | – | – | – | – | 9 Feb 1843 | Joseph Smith (instructions) | Distinguishing the nature of angels and disembodied spirits |
| 130 | – | – | – | – | 2 Apr 1843 | Joseph Smith (instruction) | Various items of instruction; corporeal nature of God and Jesus Christ; intelligence; seer stones |
| 131 | – | – | – | – | 16–17 May 1843 | Joseph Smith (instruction) | Various items of instruction; celestial marriage; eternal life |
| 132 | – | – | – | – | 12 Jul 1843 | Joseph Smith | Plural marriage; celestial marriage; sealing power; exaltation—see 1843 polygamy revelation |
| 133 | 108 | – | 100 | 108 | 3 Nov 1831 | Joseph Smith | Original "Appendix"; Second Coming; missionary work |
| 134 | 112 | – | 102 | 110 | 17 Aug 1835 | Church (declaration) | secular governments and laws in general |
| 135 | 113 | – | – | 111 | 27 Jun 1844 | John Taylor (eulogy) | Martyrdom of Joseph Smith and Hyrum Smith |
| 136 | – | – | – | – | 14 Jan 1847 | Brigham Young | Organization of Mormon pioneer westward journey |
| 137 (Note: Originally added to the LDS Church’s Pearl of Great Price in 1976, as "Vision of the Celestial Kingdom". Moved to the Doctrine and Covenants in 1979.) | – | – | – | – | 21 Jan 1836 | Joseph Smith (vision) | Salvation for the dead; salvation of little children |
| 138 (Note: Originally added to the LDS Church’s Pearl of Great Price in 1976, as "Vision of the Redemption of the Dead". Moved to the Doctrine and Covenants in 1979.) | – | – | – | – | 3 Oct 1918 | Joseph F. Smith (vision) | Jesus Christ's preaching to spirits in prison; salvation for the dead |
| OD 1 | – | – | – | – | 24 Sep 1890 | Wilford Woodruff (declaration) | Cessation of plural marriage |
| OD 2 | – | – | – | – | 8 Jun 1978 | Spencer W. Kimball, N. Eldon Tanner, Marion G. Romney (declaration) | 1978 Revelation on Priesthood: cessation of priesthood restrictions based on race |
| – (Note: Included in the LDS Pearl of Great Price as Moses chapter 1 although, due to basis on slightly different manuscript versions, there are numerous minor wording differences throughout. One example: Behold, this is my work to my glory, to the immortality and eternal life of man. — Pearl of Great Price, 1851 edition For behold, this is my work and my glory—to bring to pass the immortality and eternal life of man. — Pearl of Great Price, 1913 edition […] for this is my work and my glory, to bring to pass the immortality, and eternal life of man. — RLDS Doctrine and Covenants, 1922 edition) | 22 (Note: Approved by the 1970 World Conference.) | – | – | – | Jun 1830 | Joseph Smith | God's words to Moses (article) |
| – (Note: Included in the LDS Pearl of Great Price as Moses chapter 7.) | 36 (Note: Approved by the 1970 World Conference; Genesis 7:1–78 in the Inspired Version of the Bible.) | – | – | – | Dec 1830 | Joseph Smith | Prophecy of Enoch (article) |
| – | 108A | – | 103 | – | 17 Aug 1835 | Thomas Burdick, Warren Parrish, and Sylvester Smith (minutes of meeting) | General meeting of the quorums of the church to consider the labors of the committee charged with organizing publication of the revelations into a book |
| – | 111 | – | 101 | 109 | 17 Aug 1835 | Church (declaration) | Declaration on marriage; one spouse only |
| – | 114 | – | – | – | 7 Oct 1861 | Joseph Smith III (letter) | Tithing |
| – | 115 | – | – | – | Mar 1863 | Joseph Smith III | Calling of William Marks |
| – | 116 | – | – | – | 4 May 1865 | Joseph Smith III | Priesthood ordination of other races |
| – | 117 | – | – | – | 10 Apr 1873 | Joseph Smith III | Changes in leadership positions |
| – | 118 | – | – | – | 28 Sep 1882 | Joseph Smith III | Foreign missions |
| – | 119 | – | – | – | 11 Apr 1887 | Joseph Smith III | Instructions to the elders |
| – | 120 | – | – | – | 8 Apr 1890 | Joseph Smith III | Branch and district presidents |
| – | 121 | – | – | – | 11 Apr 1885 | Joseph Smith III | Changes in leadership positions |
| – | 122 | – | – | – | 15 Apr 1894 | Joseph Smith III | Duties of quorums |
| – | 123 | – | – | – | 20 Apr 1894 | Joint council of the First Presidency, Council of Twelve Apostles, and Presiding Bishopric (report) | Lamoni College; use of ancient and modern church history; church publications; opposing the LDS Church; doctrinal tracts; interpretation of various scriptures; gospel boat for the Society Islands; segregated branch in Detroit |
| – | 124 | – | – | – | Apr 1894 | Joseph Smith III | Changes in leadership positions |
| – | 125 | – | – | – | 15 Apr 1901 | Joseph Smith III | Patriarchs; foreign missions |
| – | 126 | – | – | – | 16 Apr 1902 | Joseph Smith III (vision) | Quorums |
| – | 127 | – | – | – | 14 Apr 1906 | Joseph Smith III | Sanitarium |
| – | 128 | – | – | – | 18 Apr 1909 | Joseph Smith III | Organization and colonization |
| – | 129 | – | – | – | 18 Apr 1909 | Joseph Smith III | Changes in leadership positions |
| – | 130 | – | – | – | 14 Apr 1913 | Joseph Smith III | Changes in leadership positions |
| – | 131 | – | – | – | 14 Apr 1914 | Joseph Smith III | Presiding Bishopric |
| – | 132 | – | – | – | 5 Apr 1916 | Frederick M. Smith | Presiding Bishop |
| – | 133 | – | – | – | 7 Apr 1920 | Frederick M. Smith | Missionary work |
| – | 134 | – | – | – | 2 Oct 1922 | Frederick M. Smith | Changes in leadership positions |
| – | 135 | – | – | – | 18 Apr 1925 | Frederick M. Smith | Changes in leadership positions |
| – | 136 | – | – | – | 14 Apr 1932 | Frederick M. Smith | Changes in leadership positions; unity |
| – | 137 | – | – | – | 7 Apr 1938 | Frederick M. Smith | Changes in leadership positions |
| – | 138 | – | – | – | 10 Apr 1940 | Frederick M. Smith | Changes in leadership positions; work toward Zion |
| – | 139 | – | – | – | 9 Apr 1946 | Israel A. Smith | Changes in leadership positions |
| – | 140 | – | – | – | 7 Apr 1947 | Israel A. Smith | Changes in leadership positions; Zion |
| – | 141 | – | – | – | 2 Oct 1948 | Israel A. Smith | Changes in leadership positions; counsel |
| – | 142 | – | – | – | 2 Apr 1950 | Israel A. Smith | Commendation; urge to work |
| – | 143 | – | – | – | 7 Apr 1954 | Israel A. Smith | Changes in leadership positions; counsel |
| – | 144 | – | – | – | 7 Apr 1954 | Israel A. Smith (letter) | New President of the Church named |
| – | 145 | – | – | – | 8 Oct 1958 | W. Wallace Smith | Changes in leadership positions |
| – | 146 | – | – | – | 2 Apr 1960 | W. Wallace Smith | Changes in leadership positions; unity commended |
| – | 147 | – | – | – | 11 Mar 1964 | W. Wallace Smith | Changes in leadership positions; stewardship |
| – | 148 | – | – | – | 18 Apr 1966 | W. Wallace Smith | Changes in leadership positions; counsel |
| – | 149 | – | – | – | 1 Apr 1968 | W. Wallace Smith | Changes in leadership positions; relationship between ministerial programs; prepare to build temple at Independence |
| – | 149A | – | – | – | 5 Apr 1968 | W. Wallace Smith | Clarification of 149 |
| – | 150 | – | – | – | 14 Apr 1972 | W. Wallace Smith | Changes in leadership positions; counsel on culture; Independence Temple preparation; ecology |
| – | 151 | – | – | – | 1 Apr 1974 | W. Wallace Smith | Changes in leadership positions; reconciliation |
| – | 152 | – | – | – | 29 Mar 1976 | W. Wallace Smith | New precedent on presidential succession; presidential successor named; changes in leadership positions; reconciliation |
| – | 153 | – | – | – | 6 Apr 1978 | Wallace B. Smith | New President of the Church; changes in leadership positions; counsel on outreach |
| – | 154 | – | – | – | 8 Apr 1980 | Wallace B. Smith | Changes in leadership positions; counsel on outreach |
| – | 155 | – | – | – | 29 Mar 1982 | Wallace B. Smith | Changes in leadership positions; counsel on witness |
| – | 156 | – | – | – | 3 Apr 1984 | Wallace B. Smith | Purpose of Independence Temple; priesthood opened to women; changes in leadership positions |
| – | 157 | – | – | – | 12 Apr 1988 | Wallace B. Smith | Changes in leadership positions; unity; humility |
| – | 158 | – | – | – | 5 Apr 1992 | Wallace B. Smith | Changes in leadership positions; the spiritual life |
| – | 159 | – | – | – | 10 Apr 1994 | Wallace B. Smith | Changes in leadership positions; trusting the Spirit; Independence Temple accepted |
| – | 160 | – | – | – | 14 Apr 1996 | Wallace B. Smith | New President of the Church named |
| – | 161 | – | – | – | 4 Apr 2000 | W. Grant McMurray | Proclaim peace; reach out; patience; embrace differences; respect tradition |
| – | 162 | – | – | – | 29 Mar 2004 | W. Grant McMurray | Be a prophetic people; diversity; tithing |
| – | 163 | – | – | – | 29 Mar 2007 | Stephen M. Veazey | Strive for peace; missionary work; use and misuse of scripture; equality; generosity |
| – | 164 | – | – | – | 17 Jan 2010 | Stephen M. Veazey | Effects of baptism, confirmation, and sacrament of the Lord's Supper; cultural awareness and sensitivity; flexibility in number of quorums of seventy; accelerate evangelism |
| – | 165 | – | – | – | 5 Apr 2016 | Stephen M. Veazey | Expand community, promote peace, and end poverty; tithing; unity in diversity; act in accordance to beliefs |

== See also ==
- Outline of the Doctrine and Covenants
- List of non-canonical revelations in The Church of Jesus Christ of Latter-day Saints
- Proclamations of the First Presidency and the Quorum of the Twelve Apostles
- Urim and Thummim (Latter Day Saints)

== Bibliography ==
- The Doctrine and Covenants of The Church of Jesus Christ of Latter-day Saints Containing Revelations Given to Joseph Smith, the Prophet, with Some Additions by his Successors in the Presidency of the Church, Intellectual Reserve: Salt Lake City, UT, 1981.
- Book of Doctrine and Covenants: Carefully Selected from the Revelations of God and Given in the Order of their Dates, Herald Publishing House: Independence, MO, 2000.
- Joseph Smith, The Doctrine and Covenants of the Church of Jesus Christ of Latter Day Saints: Carefully Selected from the Revelations of God, photo enlarged and reprinted from the 1846 Nauvoo edition by Richard Drew, Burlington (Voree), Wisconsin, 1993, for the Church of Jesus Christ of Latter Day Saints (Strangite).
- Peter Judd, Journey in Trust: A Study Resource for D&C 161, Herald House, 2004. ISBN 0-8309-1122-7
- Book of Commandments: Herald Heritage Reprint, Herald House, 1833 (reprint). ISBN 0-8309-0066-7
- F. Henry Edwards, The Edwards Commentary on the Doctrine & Covenants, Herald House, 1986. ISBN 0-8309-0187-6
- Woodford, Robert J. (1992), "Doctrine and Covenants Editions", in Ludlow, Daniel H (ed.), Encyclopedia of Mormonism, New York: Macmillan Publishing, pp. 425–427, ISBN 0-02-879602-0, OCLC 24502140
