= Account of John =

Scripture given by Joseph Smith

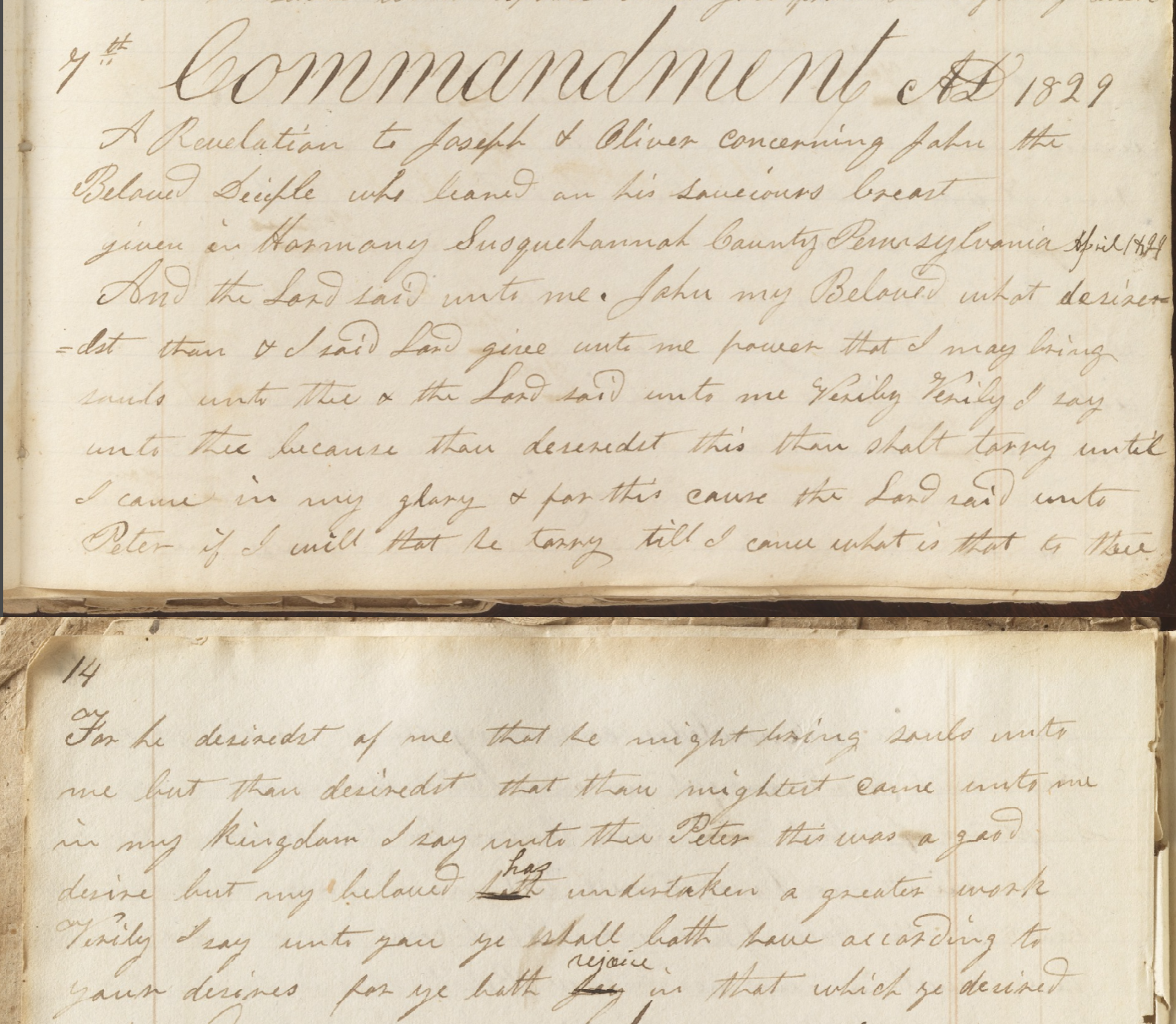
Earliest extant copy of the translation of the parchment of John, copied by John Whitmer c. March 1831

The Account of John or Parchment of John is a sacred text of the Latter Day Saint movement, which, according to Latter Day Saint theology, contains a teaching that Jesus gave to his apostles John and Peter, which John wrote down and then hid. Joseph Smith then saw the parchment in vision in April 1829 using his seer stone, and was then able to translate it.

The translation of the parchment of John was one of Smith's earliest written revelations, and along with the Book of Mormon was the earliest of Smith's translation projects. It has been canonized by both the Church of Jesus Christ of Latter-day Saints and Community of Christ in their respective editions of the Doctrine and Covenants.

In the 1835 publication of the translation, the text was significantly expanded. The reasons for the expansion were never explained, leading to broad speculation, ranging from Smith receiving a second revelation on the subject, to Smith or others anachronistically inserting elements to support recent theological developments.

== Background ==
The Gospel of John contains an enigmatic section where Jesus alludes that an anonymous beloved disciple would perhaps live till the second coming. The meaning and identity of this disciple, as well as the authorship of the account has been debated for thousands of years. It was generally believed since around the late second century that the author of the Gospel of John and beloved disciple were both John the son of Zebedee, and this was the consensus in Joseph Smith's time. The current scholarly consensus posits that the book was written by an anonymous author within the Johannine community in the late first century.

The meaning of Jesus' phrase "If I will that he tarry till I come, what is that to thee?" has similarly been broadly interpreted and debated. The scholar Adam Clarke wrote in 1825, "For nearly eighteen hundred years, the greatest men in the world have been puzzled with this passage. It would appear intolerable in me to attempt to decide where so many eminent doctors have disagreed, and do still disagree."

== History ==
In April 1829, Oliver Cowdery had begun to assist as a scribe to Joseph Smith while they were translating the Book of Mormon. During this time, a disagreement arose about whether or not the Apostle John had died or whether he was still alive. The part of the Book of Mormon being translated and the events leading up to the disagreement are unknown. However, Frank Judd and Terry Szink suggest that based on the traditional April 7 date of the revelation, that Alma 45:18–19 is a good candidate. In this location of the Book of Mormon narrative, a prophet named Alma leaves the land and is never heard from again, leaving his death ambiguous. Another proposed candidate section is 3 Nephi 28, which discusses Three Nephites who in the narrative desire of a resurrected Jesus to tarry till Jesus' second coming, which is granted to them, which Jesus noting that it was the same desire that John had. Judd and Szink point out that if 3 Nephi 28 were the catalyst, then the traditionally accepted date of the Account of John revelation should be re-examined, as it is unlikely that Smith would have reached that point in the translation by April 7.

Smith and Cowdery decided to resolve the matter by seeking a revelation from God through the Urim and Thummim. It is not clear whether the Urim and Thummim referred to were the Nephite spectacles buried with the Gold Plates or seer stone Smith had been using to translate the Book of Mormon. The response was a firsthand narrative by John, with the resurrected Christ informing him that he would tarry until the second coming to bring souls to salvation.

== Expansion ==
The text of the revelation was in flux till 1835, with minor grammatical changes and a significant expansion in 1835.

In 1832, Smith organized what came to be known as the First Presidency, composed of a president and two counselors. Smith taught in 1834 that the apostle Peter was the president of the ancient church and was assisted by two counselors, presumed to be James and John. Additionally, in 1834 Oliver Cowdery announced to the church that Peter, James and John had visited Smith and himself and given them the Melchizedek priesthood, which included the keys of church administration. References to Peter, James, and John did not appear in any early revelation but were added to various sections of the Doctrine and Covenants for the 1835 edition including the account of John.

The expansion also draws phrases from Psalm 104:4 and Hebrews 1:7,14, synthesizing the terms "flaming fires," "ministering", and "heirs of salvation".

Textual Development of the Account of John
1831 Book of Commandments and Revelations	1833 Book of Commandments	1835 Doctrine and Covenants
And the Lord said unto me. John my Beloved what desiredst thou & I said Lord give unto me power that I may bring souls unto thee & the Lord said unto me Veriley Verily I say unto thee because thou desiredst this thou shalt tarry until I come in my glory	1 AND the Lord said unto me, John my beloved, what desirest thou? and I said Lord, give unto me power that I may bring souls unto thee.— And the Lord said unto me: Verily, verily I say unto thee, because thou desiredst this, thou shalt tarry till I come in my glory:	1 And the Lord said unto me, John, my beloved, what desirest thou? For if ye shall ask, what you will, it shall be granted unto you. And I said unto him, Lord, give unto me power over death, that I may live and bring souls unto thee. And the Lord said unto me, Verily, verily, I say unto thee, because thou desiredst this thou shalt tarry until I come in my glory, and shall prophesy before nations, kindreds, tongues and people.
& for this cause the Lord said unto Peter if I will that he tarry till I come what is that to thee For he desiredst of me that he might bring souls unto me but thou desiredst that thou mightest come unto me in my kingdom I say unto thee Peter this was a good desire but my beloved hath undertaken a greater work	2 And for this cause, the Lord said unto Peter:— If I will that he tarry till I come, what is that to thee? for he desiredst of me that he might bring souls unto me: but thou desiredst that thou might speedily come unto me in my kingdom: I say unto thee, Peter, this was a good desire, but my beloved has undertaken a greater work.	2 And for this cause the Lord said unto Peter, If I will that he tarry till I come, what is that to thee? For he desiredst of me that he might bring souls unto me; but thou desiredst that thou might speedily come unto me in my kingdom. I say unto thee, Peter, this was a good desire, but my beloved has desired that he might do more, or a greater work, yet among men than what he has before done; yea, he has undertaken a greater work; therefore, I will make him as flaming fire and a ministering angel: he shall minister for those who shall be heirs of salvation who dwell on the earth; and I will make thee to minister for him and for thy brother James: and unto you three I will give this power and the keys of this ministry until I come.
Verily I say unto you ye shall both have according to your desires for ye both Joy in that which ye desired	3 Verily I say unto you, ye shall both have according to your desires, for ye both joy in that which ye have desired.	3 Verily I say unto you, ye shall both have according to your desires, for ye both joy in that which ye have desired.

== Reception by Latter Day Saints ==
John's tarrying, as described in the Account of John, resonated strongly in the early church.

Just a month after the reception of the vision, Smith dictated a section in the Book of Mormon discussing the Three Nephites, disciples of Jesus who "desired the thing which John, my beloved, who was with me in my ministry, before that I was lifted up by the Jews, desired of me." They were then granted to live "while the world shall stand." Smith began preaching in public venues that "John the Revelator was then among the ten tribes of Israel who had been led away by Salmaneser King of Israel, to prepare them for their return, from their Long dispersion, to again possess the land of their fathers."

Joseph Smith Sr., the Church's patriarch, gave hundreds of blessings to Latter-day Saints. A recurring theme was a promise similar to John's, that the individual would tarry until Jesus returned in glory. For example, apostle Orson Pratt was told that he would "tarry till the Savior comes," and Calvin Beebe was blessed, "Thou hast asked thy God to let thee tarry till the Son of Man comes: and if thou art faithful, and keep all the commandments of the Lord thou shalt have thy desire."

For Latter Day Saints, the translation incidentally answers the question of authorship of the Johannine works—something that has been debated since at least the 2nd century.

Steven C. Harper suggests that the parchment of John was a source for the Gospel of John.

Writing in Ensign magazine, Larry E. Dahl of Brigham Young University interprets the canonised account of John as an excerpt from a longer record, suggesting that the full hidden account of John would have included a first-hand account of the transfiguration of Jesus.
