= Algernon Sidney Gilbert =

Merchant and High Priest of the Latter Day Saints Church

- Born: December 28, 1789; New Haven, Connecticut
- Died: June 29, 1834 (aged 44); Clay County, Missouri
- Occupation: Merchant
- Known for: Partnering with Newel K. Whitney at the N. K. Whitney & Co. store in Kirtland, Ohio
- Spouse: Elizabeth Van Benthusen
- Children: 1

Algernon Sidney Gilbert (December 28, 1789 – June 29, 1834) was a merchant best known for his involvement with Latter-day Saint history and his partnership with Newel K. Whitney in Kirtland, Ohio. He is mentioned in seven sections of The Church of Jesus Christ of Latter-day Saints Doctrine and Covenants. He was ordained as a high priest in the state of Missouri and served as a missionary in the United States.

== Personal life ==
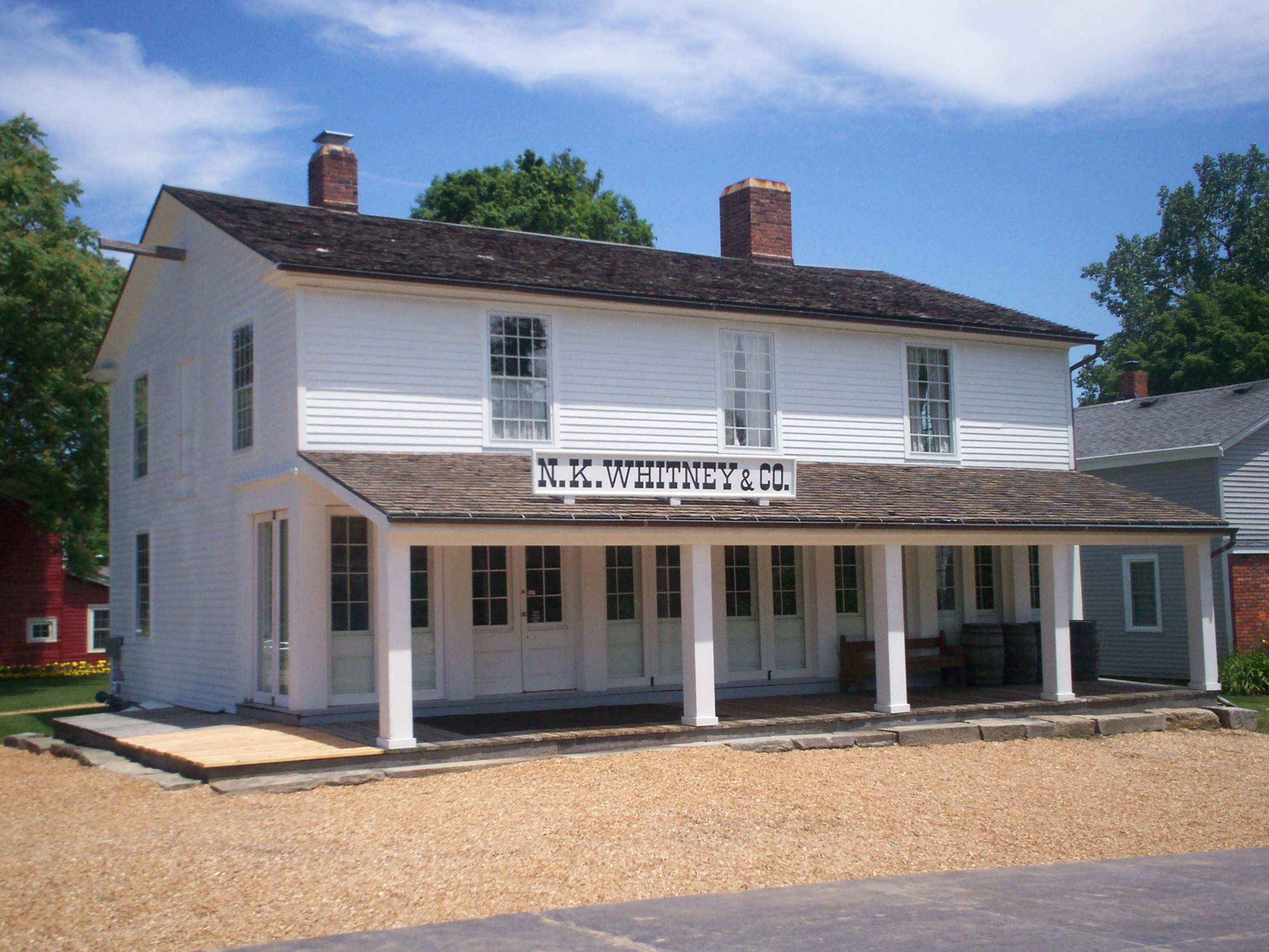
The N. K. Whitney & Co. store in Kirtland, Ohio.

Gilbert was born on December 28, 1789, at New Haven, Connecticut, to Eli Gilbert and Lydia Hemingway. He married Elizabeth Van Benthusen, September 30, 1823, in Chagrin (later Willoughby), Ohio. The two had one son.

Gilbert moved to Mentor, Ohio, which was very close to Kirtland, around 1819, and took out a large loan, which he struggled to pay off until 1826. He moved to Kirtland in 1826 and was a partner with Newel K. Whitney in the N. K. Whitney & Co. store by 1827. In 1831 he moved to Independence, Missouri, opened a store there, and was appointed bishop's agent.

== Latter-day Saint ==
Gilbert was baptized into the Church of Christ in the spring of 1831 and church founder Joseph Smith ordained him an elder on June 6, 1831. He was ordained a high priest by Smith on April 26, 1832, in Kirtland and appointed one of seven high priests in the presiding high council in Missouri. He served as a missionary in the eastern United States from June to December 1832.

Gilbert was appointed to start a store in Missouri in 1831, where Whitney and Company purchased land at a central intersection. Whitney probably sent money to help support the store. Open conflict with earlier settlers in Jackson County, Missouri, ensued after members began moving there, driven by religious and cultural differences. Vigilantes in the public and private sector used force to drive individual Latter-day Saints from Jackson to nearby counties within Missouri; eventually, Latter-day Saints were given until the end of November 6, 1833, to leave the county en masse. Gilbert condemned church leaders in a letter in 1832; the church leaders promised Gilbert that God would bless him with prosperity if he was faithful. A mob came to Independence, Missouri, in July 1833 and destroyed many things. Gilbert sold what he could before leaving Missouri.

On November 4, 1833, Gilbert was arrested and imprisoned for seven days at Independence and was among the Latter-day Saints driven from Jackson into Clay County, Missouri, later that month. He died of cholera in Clay County on June 29, 1834.

== See also ==
- 1838 Mormon War: Background
- History of the Latter Day Saint Movement in Missouri
- Zion (Latter Day Saints)
