= United Order =

19th-century collectivist program in the Latter Day Saint movement

In the Latter Day Saint movement, the United Order (also called the United Order of Enoch) was one of several 19th-century church collectivist programs. Early versions of the Order beginning in 1831 attempted to fully implement the law of consecration, a form of Christian communism or communalism, modeled after the Community of goods of the early church of Jerusalem which had "all things in common". These early versions ended after a few years. Later versions within Mormonism, primarily in the Utah Territory, implemented less-ambitious cooperative programs, many of which were very successful. The Order's full name invoked the city of Enoch, described in Latter Day Saint scripture as having such a virtuous and pure-hearted people that God had taken it to heaven.

The United Order established egalitarian communities designed to achieve income equality, eliminate poverty, and increase group self-sufficiency. The movement had much in common with other communalist utopian societies formed in the United States and Europe during the Second Great Awakening, which sought to govern aspects of people's lives through precepts of faith and community organization. The Latter Day Saint United Order was more family- and property-oriented than the utopian experiments at Brook Farm and the Oneida Community. Membership in the United Order was voluntary. Participants would deed (consecrate) all their property to the United Order, which would in turn deed back an "inheritance" (or "stewardship") which allowed members to control the property; private property was not eradicated but was rather a fundamental principle of this system. At the end of each year, any excess that the family produced from their stewardship was voluntarily given back to the Order. The Order in each community was operated by the local bishop.

The United Order is not practiced within mainstream Mormonism today; however, a number of groups of Mormon fundamentalists, such as the Apostolic United Brethren and Fundamentalist Church of Jesus Christ of Latter-Day Saints (FLDS Church), have revived the practice. The United Order was also practiced by the liberal Mormon sect called the United Order Family of Christ and the Cutlerite sect the Church of Jesus Christ.

== Under Joseph Smith ==
Joseph Smith learned of a group of about 50 people known as "the family" living on Isaac Morley's farm near Kirtland, Ohio, who had established a cooperative venture based on statements in the Book of Acts. Members of "The Morley family" were originally followers of Sidney Rigdon, a minister associated with the Restoration Movement who later converted to Mormonism. Many of these communalists also joined the new church and several, including Isaac Morley, served in leadership positions. Levi Hancock records an early event wherein a "family member" stole his pocket watch and sold it, claiming it was "all in the family."

Smith was troubled because of the number of members joining the church in poverty in Kirtland, Ohio. Revenue was needed for the church to publish books and tracts. At this time, Smith and Rigdon were both in economic distress. Smith and his wife Emma lived on the Morley farm for a period of time.

On February 4, 1831, Smith said he had received a revelation calling Edward Partridge to be the first bishop of the church. Five days later, on February 9, 1831, Smith described a second revelation detailing the law of consecration.

Smith said he had received a revelation directing the Latter Day Saints to impart of their land and money to the church. Partridge assigned the incoming saints from New York lots according to another revelation. Smith directed Colesville immigrants to settle in Thompson, Ohio, a few miles east of Kirtland, on a farm owned by Leman Copley. Saints from Seneca County were assigned to the Morley farm.

Partridge attempted to implement the United Order in Thompson; however, disagreements broke out and he was unsuccessful. Shortly after, Smith announced a revelation directing Newel Knight to lead the saints on the Copley farm to settle in Missouri.

Originally, the United Order was intended to be "an everlasting order for the benefit of my church, and for the salvation of men until I come". In practice, however, the Order was relatively short-lived during Smith's life.

== Under Brigham Young ==
From 1855 to 1858, members of the Church of Jesus Christ of Latter-day Saints (LDS Church) once again considered living under the United Order. During this period, under the leadership of Brigham Young, church members were instructed to prepare deeds of consecration, but these deeds were never acted upon perhaps due to the community disruption caused by the Utah War.

It was not until 1874 that Young initiated the United Order of Enoch, beginning in St. George, Utah, on February 9, 1874. There were a number of differences between the United Order of Enoch and United Order communities established years earlier by Joseph Smith. Under Young's leadership, producers would generally deed their property to the Order, and all members of the Order would share the cooperative's net income, often divided into shares based on the amount of property originally contributed. Sometimes, the members of the Order would receive wages for their work on the communal property.

The cooperative plan was used in at least 200 Mormon communities, most of them in rural areas outlying the central Mormon settlements near the Great Salt Lake. Most of the communities held out for only two or three years before returning to a more standard economic system.

One of the last United Order corporations established the new community of Bunkerville, Nevada, in 1877. In 1880, the Bunkerville cooperative dissolved under pressure from limited water and a lack of individual dedication and initiative.

Like the United Order established by Smith, Young's experiment with the United Order was short-lived. By the time of Young's death in 1877, most of his United Orders had failed. By the end of the 19th century, the Orders were essentially extinct. Historian Andrew Karl Larson pointed out that the failure of these ventures are rooted in the frailties of human nature:

The habits of an acquisitive society were too strongly forged to be broken without the utmost devotion and selflessness to the cause, and rugged individualism triumphed over the abortive attempt at communal ownership and communal living here.

Some leaders and members of the Church of Jesus Christ of Latter-day Saints believe that the United Order will be reestablished some time in the future. Many leaders have taught that the church's present system of welfare and humanitarian aid is a predecessor or stepping stone to the renewed practice of the United Order in the future.

=== Kanab ===
Many United Order communities were set up amongst Mormon towns beginning in 1874. One in particular was the United Order of Kanab, which was a settlement initiated by Brigham Young. Kanab was established in 1870. That year, John R. Young and the local bishop, Levi Stewart, began colonizing this area and twelve families followed to begin this endeavor. There was confusion as to who was the leader of this society. LDS Church authorities appointed the bishop and only they could revoke his status. But many wanted to elect John R. Young as president because he was related to LDS Church president Brigham Young. This conflict of power lasted until January 5, 1875, when Levi Stewart became the president. Eventually, Stewart resigned from his position and L. John Nuttall of Provo took his place.

Other families followed that were either unhappy in their own lives or were from other failing colonies. By 1874, there were 81 families and about 17% of the men that lived in this community practiced polygamy. The households were simple in structure and were usually two to three bedrooms. There were about three children per mother in every household and polygamous wives lived in the same home as well. Large families in all Mormon communities were regarded as a spiritual practice and the child to woman ratio in Kanab reflected that.

The main source of income for the community was raising livestock. Most of their wealth was in livestock, vehicles, and shares of stock in corporate enterprises. The land and the improvements made up the remainder of their wealth. This particular United Order was wealthy, but within the society, there were major gaps. Everyone owned property, but some pieces of land were better than others. Eventually, Brigham Young ordered the community to diminish the financial gap that set them apart from the other communities.

Many suffered hardships while living on the frontier and tended to move frequently, around the same area to escape the harsh conditions and seek greater opportunities. It also made it easy to migrate since most of the wealth people had was movable. The number of families moving three or more times was below 50. Only 23 families moved four times or more and 13 moved five times or more.

By 1880, the United Order at Kanab had greatly decreased. Only 32 families remained of the original 81 families that came within the first year of its establishment. Many eventually migrated to Arizona, Nevada, New Mexico, and Mexico. The young men tended to leave home before they were married and started families of their own.

=== 'The Firm' (Farmington) ===
The longest known surviving Order in the Church was that of the Ezra T. Clark Family, referred to internally as 'The Firm'. With the permission and blessing of Brigham Young, Clark established the order within his own family at Farmington which lasted from the 1870s until it was dissolved on July 24, 1901, months before the patriarch's death. Originally, Clark was chosen as treasurer of the Farmington, Utah Order, but an astute businessman, intimately acquainted with the difficulties of this and other Orders, Clark withdrew, believing he could establish an Order successfully with his own family comprising 14 sons and four daughters from his two wives. 'The Firm', whose primary business activity was farming to produce feed, proved successful in imbuing all the spiritual principals for which they were devised, in addition to being a commercial success by all measures. The Davis County Bank, mercantile, (Farmington Commercial & Manufacturing Co., known as the FC&M) and several stately homes in the Clark Lane National Historical District are all in use today and stand as a testament to The Firm's efficacy.

== Property ==
Private property was not abolished and sharing of goods was voluntary under the United Order. Members of the church who chose to participate in the United Order voluntarily deeded their properties to the church, which would then give all or a portion of it back to the original property owner as a stewardship. The "residue," or property which was over and above what the owner and his family required for themselves, was used by the church to provide to the less fortunate, who would be required to pay it back either monetarily or by labor. The private property owner was not forced to participate in the Order nor was his property forcefully confiscated. Private property owners were free to join or leave the orders and were in control of their stewardship. J. Reuben Clark, a member of the First Presidency, explained:

The fundamental principle of this system was the private ownership of property. Each man owned his portion, or inheritance, or stewardship, with an absolute title, which he could alienate, or hypothecate, or otherwise treat as his own. The church did not own all of the property, and the life under the United Order was not a communal life. ... The United Order is an individualistic system, not a communal system.

Lorenzo Snow, a president of the Church of Jesus Christ of Latter-day Saints, also highlighted the United Order's preservation of individual free will:

In things that pertain to celestial glory there can be no forced operations. We must do according as the spirit of the Lord operates upon our understandings and feelings. We cannot be crowded into matters, however great might be the blessing attending such procedure. We cannot be forced into living a celestial law; we must do this ourselves, of our own free will. And whatever we do in regard to the principle of the United Order, we must do it because we desire to do it.

== Relation to Marxist communism ==
This United Order was an attempt to eradicate poverty and promote a sense of unity and brotherhood within Latter Day Saint communities. The LDS Church's view is that the doctrine and the various attempts at practicing it should not be seen as part of the 19th-century utopian movement in the United States, and is distinct from both Marxist communism and capitalism.

Leaders of the Church of Jesus Christ of Latter-day Saints in the 20th century sought to make a clear distinction between Marxist communism and the law of consecration as practiced by the United Order, teaching that the practices differed as related to the topics of free will, private property, and deity. The law of consecration and the United Order can be compared to the shared economic arrangement presented in the New Testament as practiced by 1st-century Christians in Jerusalem. In the 20th century, leaders of the Church of Jesus Christ of Latter-day Saints, including David O. McKay, Harold B. Lee, Ezra Taft Benson, Marion G. Romney, and J. Reuben Clark, claimed that communism is a "counterfeit" version of the law of consecration. In 1942, the church issued the following statement:

Communism and all other similar isms bear no relationship whatever to the United Order. They are merely the clumsy counterfeits which Satan always devises of the Gospel plan ... The United Order leaves every man free to choose his own religion as his conscience directs. Communism destroys man's God-given free agency; the United Order glorifies it. Latter-day Saints cannot be true to their faith and lend aid, encouragement, or sympathy to any of these false philosophies.

Nevertheless, communal unity and equality are central tenets of the Latter Day Saint doctrine of Zion as described in Moses 7:18, "And the Lord called his people Zion, because they were of one heart and one mind, and dwelt in righteousness; and there was no poor among them."

== See also ==
- Bishop's storehouse
- Catholic social teaching
- Christian anarchism
- Christian communism
- Communalism (political philosophy)
- Communitarianism
- History of the Latter Day Saint movement
- Mormonism and the national debate over socialism and communism
- Mutualism (economic theory)
- Religious communism
- Tithe
- Zion's Central Board of Trade
- Zion's Co-operative Mercantile Institution
