= Zion (Latter Day Saints) =

Kingdom of God in Mormon theology

Within the Latter Day Saint movement, Zion is often used to connote an association of the righteous. This association would practice a form of communitarian economics, called the United Order, which were meant to ensure that all members maintained an acceptable quality of life, class distinctions were minimized, and group unity achieved.

While Zion has often been linked with theocracy, the concept of Zion did not theoretically require such a governmental system. In this way, Zion must be distinguished from the ideal political system called theodemocracy, which Latter Day Saints believed would be adopted upon Christ's Second Coming. However, "Zion" maintains several possible meanings within the Latter Day Saint lexicon.

Latter Day Saints also believe in the construction of a New Jerusalem on the American continent, which is also referred to as Zion. Latter Day Saints believe the New Jerusalem will be built in Jackson County, Missouri by a remnant of the house of Joseph, assisted by repentant Gentiles.

== Latter Day Saint usage of "Zion" ==
Depending on context, "Zion" can have multiple meanings in the Latter Day Saint movement. Examples include:

1. Zion retains its Biblical meaning and refers to Jerusalem. (See Zion)
2. Zion is the name of a physical city founded by the prophet Enoch, also known as the City of Enoch.
3. Zion refers to the New Jerusalem, a physical, Millennial city expected to be located in Independence, Jackson County, Missouri.
4. Zion metaphorically refers to any group of people that are unified and "pure in heart". The City of Enoch is one example of "a Zion people", and the people described in Fourth Nephi is another. For Zion to be fully realized, the society must be willing to live the law of consecration based on mutual feelings of charity, which is the pure love of Christ.
5. Zion is the central physical location to which Latter Day Saints have gathered. The term has been applied to: Kirtland, Ohio; Jackson County, Missouri; Nauvoo, Illinois; and the Salt Lake Valley.
6. Zion National Park includes Zion Canyon, which was named by LDS settlers in the 1850s and designated as a national park in 1919.
7. Zion is also, according to Joseph Smith, the entirety of the Americas. Smith stated that "the whole of America is Zion itself from north to south".
8. Zion is a metaphor for a unified society of Latter Day Saints, metaphorically gathered as members of the Church of Christ. In this sense any stake of the church may be referred to as a "stake of Zion".

== Discussion ==
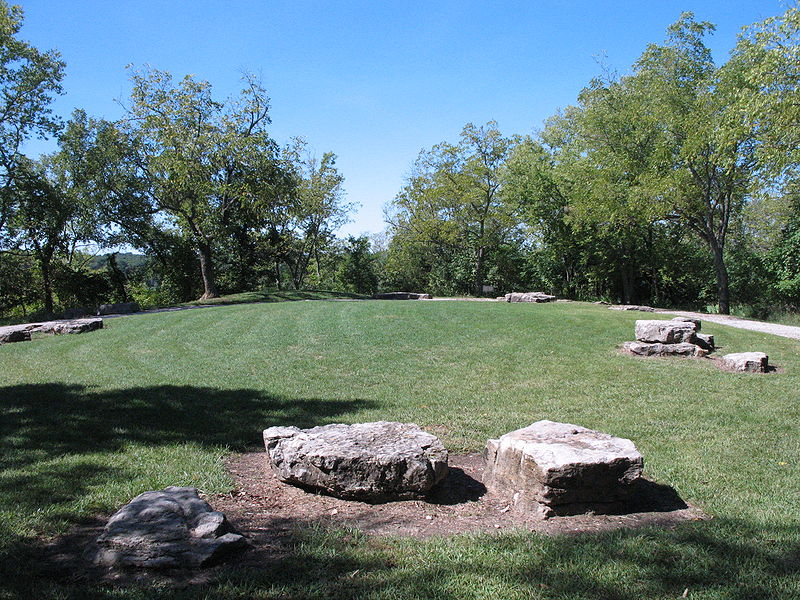
Tower Hill at Adam-ondi-Ahman, Missouri USA

In one interpretation, Zion refers to a specific location to which members of the millennial church are to be gathered together to live. Stipulated by what is believed by the Latter-day Saints to be the revelation of Joseph Smith (D&C 57:1–5, LDS Church ed.), this is said to be located in Jackson County, Missouri, and its county seat, Independence. The Latter Day Saints were expelled from Jackson County in 1833. The region of Kansas City Metropolitan Area remains important today in the doctrine of the Church of Jesus Christ of Latter-day Saints (LDS Church) and Community of Christ, as well as many smaller branches and offshoots of the Latter Day Saint movement, who view it as having a crucial role to play in their Christian Millennialist theology.

In its broadest sense, Zion is regarded by Latter Day Saints as an association of the "pure in heart". Central to Zion's philosophical underpinnings was a sense of community cohesiveness and unity, a concept which seemed to be unraveling in the world of Jacksonian Democracy. Smith taught that the people of Zion would have all things in common (see United Order), and would not allow others in their community to suffer because of the principles of love, unselfishness, and work for the common good which would be imbued in the individuals capable of maintaining such a society. Zion therefore stands in contrast to proverbial Babylon, where wickedness, disunity, and poverty prevail.

The word "Zion" appears 53 times in the Book of Mormon, a key part of the Latter Day Saint canon, and 268 times in the LDS Church's version of the Doctrine and Covenants, a part of its canon consisting of what members believe to be modern-day revelation and written down by Smith mostly in the 19th century. Following the disappointments and strife which took place in Missouri during initial attempts to establish a "City of the Saints" in the region, the concept of Zion evolved to encompass a less geographically specific idea similar to the orthodox Christian concept of the "ekklesia" (See Ecclesia (Church)) or community of believers regardless of location. This concept is hinted at in such scriptural passages as the following: "Therefore, verily, thus saith the Lord, let Zion rejoice, for this is Zion—THE PURE IN HEART; therefore, let Zion rejoice, while all the wicked shall mourn."

Esoterically considered, "Zion" as used in this context is a dualistic term connoting a sanctified group of people living according to the commandments and ordinances as revealed to them. Latter Day Saints use the name to signify a group of God's followers, or any location pertaining to where they live. As well as signifying a group and place it is also applied to more than one situation and may be fulfilled at more than one time. Thus, "Zion" has several related but not necessarily synonymous applications. These applications make reference to the following: 1) The Jerusalem of Judah; 2) The New Jerusalem in America; and 3) The Lord's people and their gathering places around the world.

Exoterically (mundanely) considered, a gathering place in the modern Latter Day Saint organizational context refers to wards (basic congregational units), stakes (groups of several wards), and homes or communities where believers are striving to live what is referred to as "the fulness of the gospel" in righteousness. It is a worldwide movement in which the faithful work towards becoming a pure people, willing to serve God. The community of such faithful church members are referred to metonymically as "the pure in heart" in their scriptures.

The ancient people of Enoch sum it up by saying "the Lord called his people Zion, because they were of one heart and one mind, and dwelt in righteousness; and there was no poor among them".

In the Mormon fundamentalism movement, a more literal interpretation of Zion as a specific geographical location is held to more strongly and a more stringent emphasis is placed upon individual and community lifestyle requirements that are considered, to be necessary prerequisites to establishing such a community. These requirements are often referred to as "the fulness of the gospel" and as "ordinances", specific commandments which have long set this movement apart from mainstream Christianity. The two most frequently noted requirements are the United Order (a form of agrarian communalism) and plural marriage, both of which are de-emphasized in the mainstream LDS Church and, in the case of plural marriage, expressly prohibited and denounced.

A modern-day proponent of the Mormon fundamentalist movement, Ogden Kraut, summarized the fundamentalist/dissident position on "Zion" as follows:

The Saints failed to live the higher laws in the center stake of Zion in Missouri so they were expelled. During the four years at Nauvoo, there was not even an attempt to live the United Order, for example, so they were again driven out. They became like the children of Israel in the desert with only the hope of keeping Zion's laws. But here in the valleys of the Rocky Mountains we have done worse than in Missouri and Illinois. For a few years after the pioneers arrived, an attempt was made to live the United Order and plural marriage, but both leaders and members failed to continue those important laws. Thus, the Church has gone astray from keeping all the laws of Zion, and the redemption of Zion is seldom even mentioned.

== History ==
Joseph Smith wrote of Zion even before the organization of the Latter Day Saint church. In April 1829, he dictated a revelation which urged him and his scribe, Oliver Cowdery, to "seek to bring forth and establish the cause of Zion." The attempt to reach that goal became a driving force in early Latter Day Saint history, and remains a powerful influence among Latter Day Saints today.

In March 1830, the Book of Mormon was published. The Book of Mormon prophet Ether taught that a remnant of the house of Joseph would build a holy city in the Americas. Afterwards, there would be a New Jerusalem that would come down from heaven where the remnant would live. Latter Day Saints believe that this refers to the City of Enoch, and that it will return to the earth from heaven at the Second Coming. Later in the Book of Mormon timeline, Jesus visited the Nephites in the Americas and taught that they were a remnant of the house of Joseph. After they were brought to the knowledge of the Lord, they would be given the Americas as their inheritance. Repentant Gentiles will assist them in building the New Jerusalem. Early Latter Day Saints interpreted these scriptures to mean that there would be a sudden and dramatic conversion of the American Indians to Mormonism. They viewed themselves as repentant Gentiles that would assist the American Indians in building the New Jerusalem, They warned Americans who did not repent would be destroyed by the American Indians to make way for the New Jerusalem, based on a scripture in the Book of Mormon that warns the Gentiles to repent, "lest a remnant of the seed of Jacob shall go forth among you as a lion, and tear you in pieces, and there is none to deliver."

In January 1831, Parley P. Pratt took these teachings to the Lenape, a mission which many Mormons expected to be very successful and dominated Latter Day Saint thought in Kirtland. Pratt taught the Delaware Indians that they were descendants of the Book of Mormon people, and that according to the Book of Mormon, they would recover their ancestral lands. However, by February 1831, the mission was cut short when the missionaries didn't have the correct permits.

Also around this time, the Book of Moses started being published in the church newspapers Evening and Morning Star and Times and Seasons, which would later be canonized in the Pearl of Great Price. According to the narrative, Enoch, the son of Jared, founds a city for the righteous descendants of Adam, except for the descendants of Cain, who were black and had no place among them. This city became so righteous and pure that it was translated (taken) from the presence of the earth and brought into the presence of God, leaving behind on earth only Methuselah and his family (including Noah) to repopulate the earth with righteous people. It was described as populated by an organization of people who are common owners of the property and none being richer or poorer.

After Pratt's unsuccessful mission, the concept of the New Jerusalem started being reinterpreted and integrated with the teaching of Zion. Instead of being built by the Native Americans, the New Jerusalem was to be built by white Latter Day Saints. Instead of seeing themselves as repentant Gentiles, they began seeing themselves as also being a remnant of the house of Joseph, through Ephraim. Instead of building New Jerusalem together with the Native Americans, they began seeing it as two different places, with Zion being built upon the hills and the Lamanites in the wilderness.

On July 20, 1831, Smith stated that he had received a revelation that designated a physical location for the Saints to start to build Zion, which he taught would be the future New Jerusalem. The revelation designated Missouri as the "land which I have appointed and consecrated for the gathering of the saints." The revelation further stated, "Behold, the place which is now called Independence is the center place; and the spot for the temple is lying westward ..." Smith later envisioned the temple as being the starting point for the creation of a New Jerusalem: "Verily this is the word of the Lord, that the city New Jerusalem shall be built by the gathering of the saints, beginning at this place, even the place of the temple, which temple shall be reared in this generation." While Latter Day Saints were anxious to gather to Missouri, Smith said he received another revelation to stay in Kirtland for five years, during which time the wicked would not be destroyed.

Teachings about Zion, the New Jerusalem and the accompanying destruction of unrepentant Gentiles to build the New Jerusalem added to the existing conflict between Latter Day Saints and their non-Latter Day Saint neighbors. This made it difficult for the Latter Day Saints to build Zion. By July 1833, Smith said he received an additional revelation stating that Zion was the pure in heart. The Latter Day Saints no longer viewed the building of Zion as imminent. A revelation in December 1833 through Smith states the belief that the Latter Day Saints were unable to establish Zion in "consequence of their transgressions". The revelation says that among the Saints there were "jarrings, and contentions, and envyings, and strifes, and lustful and covetous desires among them; therefore by these things they polluted their inheritances." Instead, Joseph Smith began teaching that "The whole of North and South America is Zion, the mountain of the Lord's house is in the center of North and South America.". The Latter Day Saints were finally driven from Missouri in 1838 as a consequence of the Mormon War and Governor Lilburn Boggs' Extermination Order.

On March 1, 1842, Smith wrote 13 statements of belief which would later be adopted as the faith's articles of faith. He wrote that "Zion will be built on the American continent." For the rest of the century, Latter Day Saints were encouraged to gather to Zion by gathering to the centers of the church population in different places in America, such as Nauvoo, Illinois and Utah. However, in the twentieth century, Zion began to be reinterpreted as a spiritual gathering where one changed their heart rather than their home. After this time, the concept of Zion as a specific piece of geography (Jackson County, Missouri) began to lose its importance. Zion also became a euphemism for wherever the Saints were gathered. "In Missouri and Illinois, Zion had been a city; in Utah, it was a landscape of villages; in the urban diaspora, it was the ward with its extensive programs."

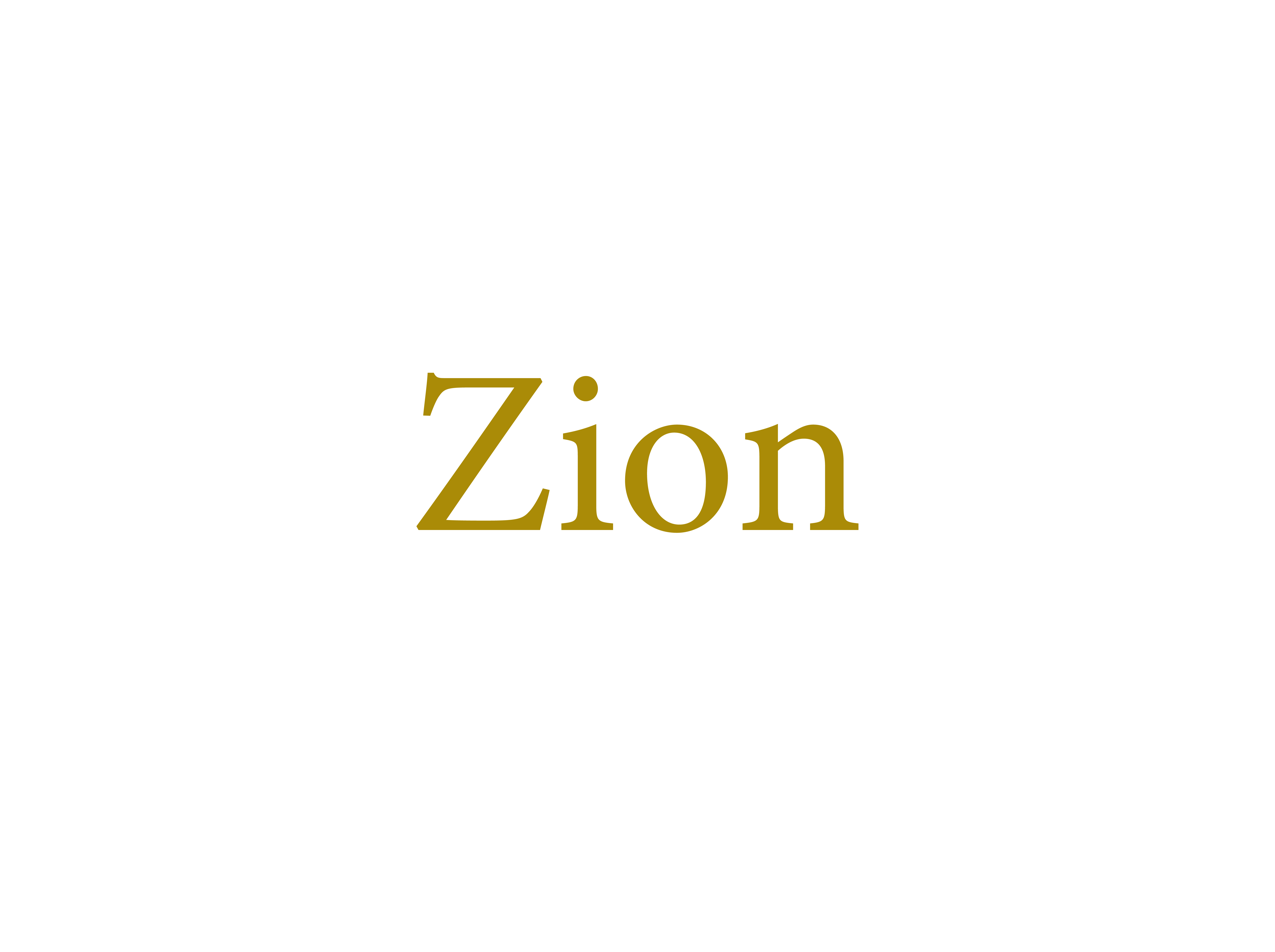
Reconstruction of the flag raised in 1855

However, Latter Day Saints still held on to the idea of building a Zion in Jackson County, Missouri, particularly a temple for the New Jerusalem. President Lorenzo Snow taught that "there are many here now under the sound of my voice, probably a majority who will have to go back to Jackson county and assist in building the temple.". The responsibility of building the New Jerusalem temple continued to belong to Ephraim, and not the Lamanites. Bruce R. McConkie taught: "An occasional whiff of nonsense goes around the Church acclaiming that the Lamanites will build the temple in the New Jerusalem and that Ephraim and others will come to their assistance. This illusion is born of an inordinate love for Father Lehi's children and of a desire to see them all become now as Samuel the Lamanite once was. The Book of Mormon passages upon which it is thought to rest have reference not to the Lamanites but to the whole house of Israel. The temple in Jackson County will be built by Ephraim, meaning the Church as it is now constituted."

In the 1970s, the Church of Jesus Christ of Latter-day Saints modified the 10th Article of Faith to read "Zion (the New Jerusalem) will be built on the American continent," a clarification that was now needed with multiple understandings of the term Zion.

=== Plat of Zion ===
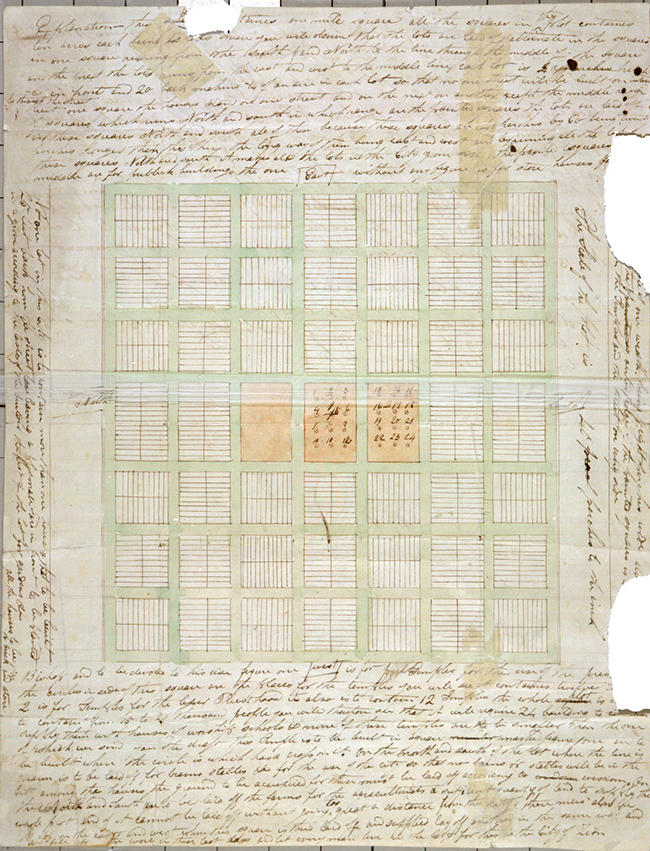
This one page Plat written in June 1833 by Joseph Smith defines a comprehensive multiple city plan.

A comprehensive plat was devised by Smith in 1833, describing the planned city as an organized grid system of blocks and streets, with blocks house lots that alternated in direction by columns of blocks between north-south streets. Designed around Latter Day Saint principles of agrarianism order and community, the plan called for 24 temples at the city's center, reflecting the central role played by the church in the community. The temples were to be used for education, administration, cultural events and worship. The plan called for a city of 15,000 to 20,000 people living in a 1-square-mile (2.6 km^{2}) city with agricultural land to be reserved on all sides of the city, enough to supply the city "without going too great of a distance". The plan did not allow a city to become too large; once a city had reached the 20,000 limit it was envisaged that other cities would be built: "When this square is thus laid off and supplied, lay off another in the same way, and so fill up the world." While never utilized, the plat ultimately served as a blueprint for subsequent Mormon settlements in the Mormon Corridor.

== Contemporary application ==
Today, Latter Day Saints are counseled by their leaders to build up the cause of Zion, and prepare themselves to be worthy of such a society. They look to the City of Enoch as an ideal to follow. Enoch's exclusion of teaching black people was used to justify the racial exclusion policy before 1978. Once this system is applied to the modern day Zion, it will be referred to as the United Order or the Order of Enoch. The modern-day Zion comes after the Zion of Enoch and the Zion at Jerusalem.

Latter Day Saints believe that, at the Second Coming, Zion the City of Enoch will return to the earth from heaven, a belief based on the part of the Scripture that stated this return and that "its inhabitants shall join with the New Jerusalem, which shall then be established." It is taught that the Zion of America will be reunited with the Zion of Enoch but, that first, it must equal to the stature of Enoch's Zion in order to be worthy to join with it.

== See also ==
- Council of Fifty
- Gathering (LDS Church)
- Kingdom of God
- Kingdom of God: Latter-day Saints
- Native American people and Mormonism
- Second Coming (LDS Church)
- Stirling Agricultural Village, Alberta, Canada
- Zion's Camp
