= LDS Visitors Center, Independence, Missouri =

Church of Jesus Christ of Latter-Day Saints building

Coordinates: 39.089802°N 94.426747°W

LDS Visitors Center
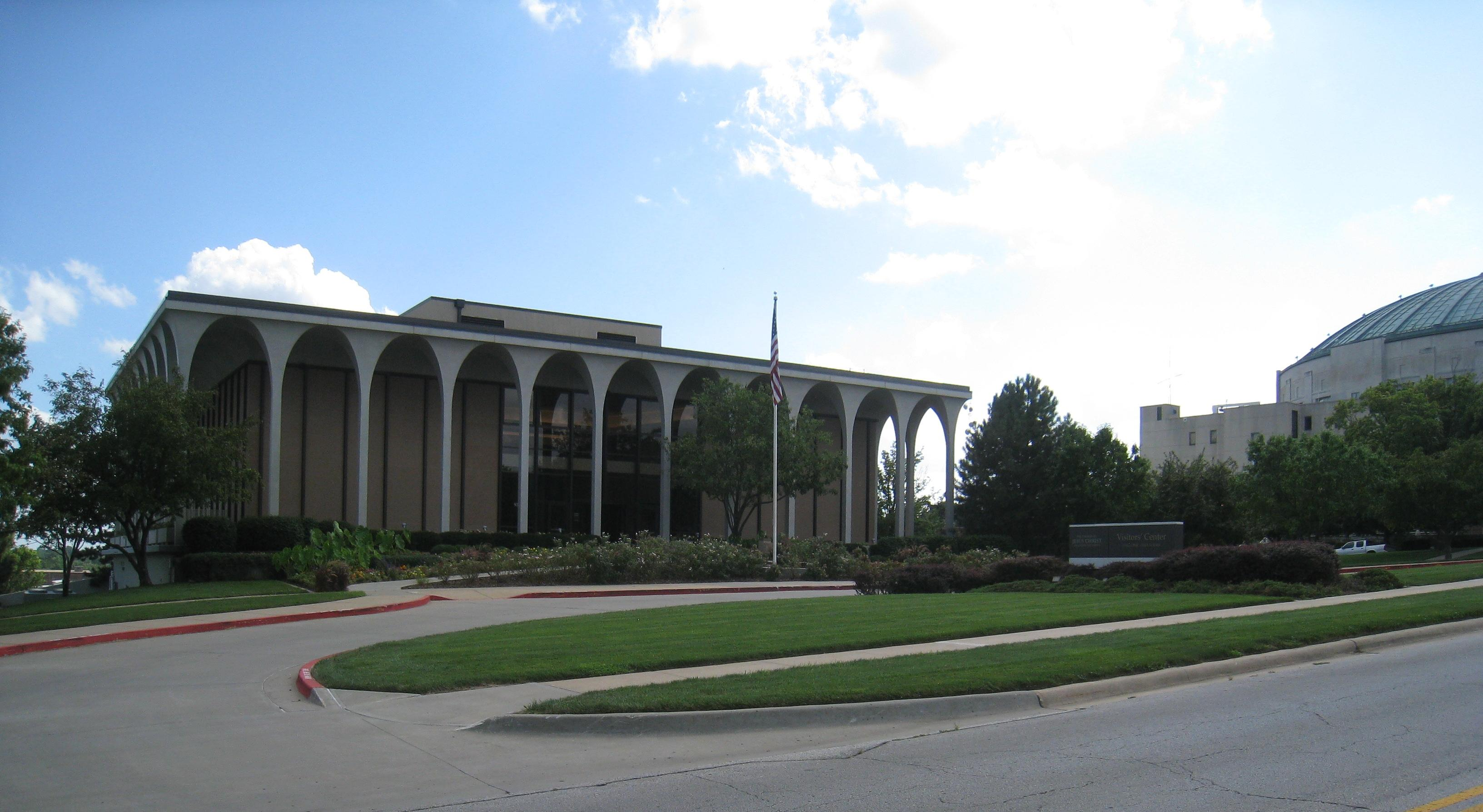
- The Church of Jesus Christ of Latter-Day Saints Visitors Center in central Independence, Missouri, located south across the street from the Independence Temple, and shown east across the street from the Community of Christ Auditorium, which is just visible to the right.
- Interactive map of the LDS Visitors Center area

General information
- Inaugurated: May 31, 1971
- Owner: The Church of Jesus Christ of Latter-day Saints

The Independence Visitors' Center (dedicated on May 31, 1971) is a visitors' center owned and operated by the Church of Jesus Christ of Latter-day Saints (LDS Church) in Independence, Missouri. The center is situated on the Greater Temple Lot dedicated and purchased by Joseph Smith and his associates in 1831, only a few yards from the Church of Christ (Temple Lot)'s headquarters and the Community of Christ temple.

== History ==
The property upon which the visitors' center stands was first purchased on December 19, 1831, by Edward Partridge, acting on behalf of Smith. It was repurchased by the LDS Church, which had become the largest of several different Latter Day Saint denominations, on April 14, 1904. The purchase was completed by James G. Duffin, who was president of the church's Central States Mission, acting on behalf of the First Presidency.

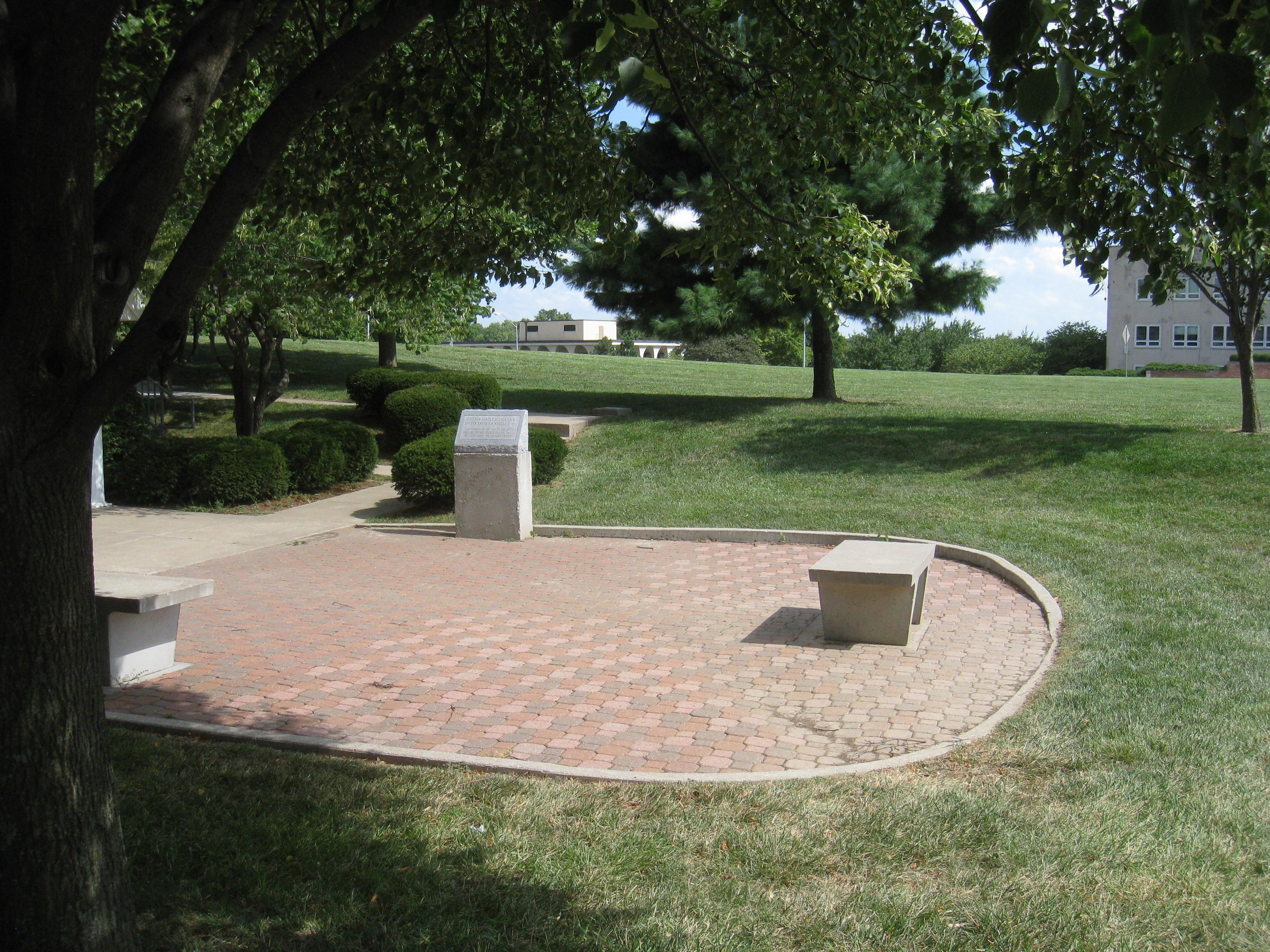
View southward from the Community of Christ's Stone Church (Independence, Missouri), of that portion of the "Temple Lot" owned by the Temple Lot church. This view shows the roof of the LDS Visitors' Center, and its proximity to the elevated portion of the, Temple Lot.

A few months later, the Kansas City Times published a rumor (but corrected itself the next day) that the so-called "Utah Mormons" had secretly purchased the entire Greater Temple Lot, including that portion owned by the Church of Christ (Temple Lot), which had been the subject of a lawsuit in the 1890s between the Temple Lot church and the Reorganized Church of Jesus Christ of Latter Day Saints (RLDS Church). The portion owned by the Temple Lot church was the highest-altitude 2.5 acres (10,000 m^{2}) portion of the 63.5 acres (257,000 m^{2}) originally purchased by Partridge in December 1831, and had been repurchased by Granville Hedrick, founder of the Temple Lot church, between 1867 and 1877. Both pieces of real estate are often confused, because since 1867 both the 2.5-acre (10,000 m^{2}) area and the larger 63.5-acre (257,000 m^{2}) area have been described in newspaper and other media reports as the "Mormon Temple Lot." A January 2009 online article by Community of Christ researcher John C. Hamer entitled "The Temple Lot: Visions and Realities" helps clear up the confusion.

The visitors' center opened in 1971, the same year as another particularly notable LDS visitors' center in Nauvoo, Illinois. Its style of presenting LDS Church beliefs and doctrines in a modern audio-visual and interactive format was the brainchild of Bernard P. Brockbank, a church general authority, who had overseen implementation of the same style at the 1964 New York World's Fair.

=== Pageants ===
During the last few decades of the 20th century, the church produced an outdoor summertime pageant adjacent to the visitors center. The pageant first premiered in June 1975 and was titled Missouri, Mormons and Miracles. The performance featured 300 persons and was produced by the church's Independence and Kansas City stakes. The story sought to provide answers as to where we came from, why we are here, and where we go after death, using Latter-day Saint theology. Each year the script evolved and the performance was renamed Families Are Forever in 1979, then Families Can Be Forever in 1982.

In June 1985, a new pageant premiered called Independence, 1833, which was renamed A Frontier Story, 1833 two years later. This pageant's main storyline included two 19th-century women—one a Latter-day Saint settler recently arrived in Missouri and the other a non-Mormon Missourian—who became friends in spite of their differences and during a turbulent period in the city's history. In 1997, the church announced the pageant would be cancelled that year and new presentation would follow in the future. However, no new pageant was ever performed.

== Theories on future use ==
The visitors' center is alleged to have been designed after the Parthenon, one of the world's most renowned temples. This has fueled speculation as to whether the visitors' center is a temple constructed on the Greater Temple Lot dedicated and purchased by Smith and his associates for that purpose in 1831. An October 1952 Kansas City Times essay written by a friend and admirer of RLDS Church Historian Heman C. Smith (1850–1919) published the rumor that the LDS Church intended to build a temple on the site today occupied by the center. In his 2004 book Images of New Jerusalem author Craig S. Campbell examines the rumor, but is skeptical that the building may be "converted someday" into a temple.
