= Temple Lot Case =

United States legal case

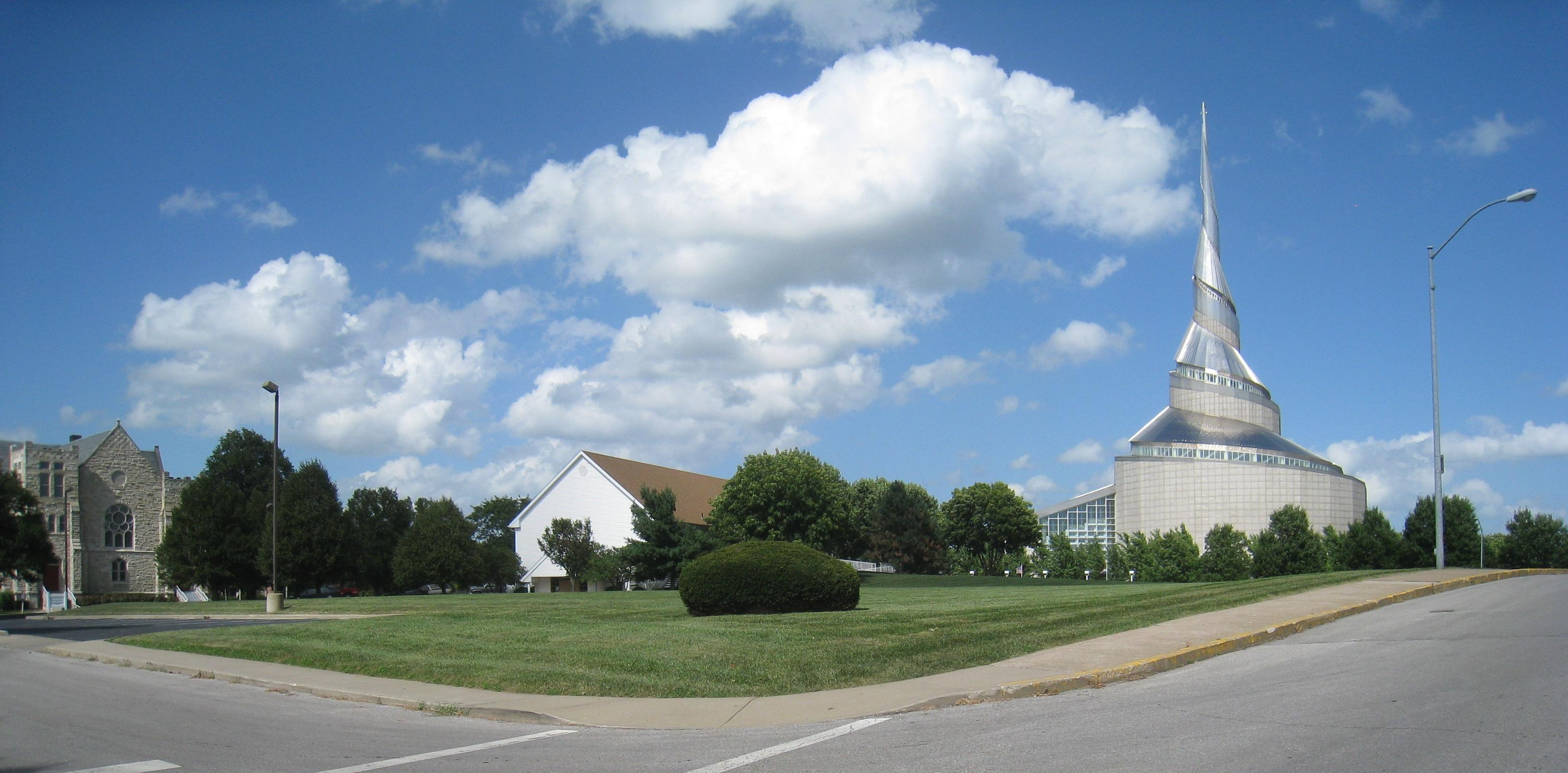
View east-northeastward of the "Hedrickite" Temple Lot today. The 2.5-acre "block" shown is the highest-elevation part of a 63.5-acre piece of real estate which has variously been referred to (also) as the "Temple Lot" or "Mormon Temple Lot" or "Temple Parcel" or "Temple Block" or "Temple Property" or "Greater Temple Lot", purchased by Edward Partridge on December 19, 1831. The portion shown in this photograph was re-purchased on behalf of trustee Granville Hedrick between 1867 and 1877.

The Temple Lot Case (also known as the Temple Lot Suit and formally known as The Reorganized Church of Jesus Christ of Latter Day Saints, complainant, v. the Church of Christ at Independence, Missouri) was a United States legal case in the 1890s which addressed legal ownership of the Temple Lot, a significant parcel of land in the Latter Day Saint movement. In the case, the Reorganized Church of Jesus Christ of Latter Day Saints (RLDS Church, now Community of Christ) claimed legal title of the land and asked the court to order the Church of Christ (Temple Lot) to cease its occupation of the property. The RLDS Church won the case at trial, but the decision was reversed on appeal.

== Pre-trial ownership of Temple Lot ==
The Temple Lot is a small parcel of land in Independence, Missouri. In the early 1830s, the lot was designated by Joseph Smith as the site for a proposed temple for a prophesied city of "Zion" or "New Jerusalem". In 1831, Latter Day Saint Bishop Edward Partridge purchased the Temple Lot from Jones H. Flournoy and Clara Flournoy on behalf of Smith's Latter Day Saint church. Partridge held the property in trust for the church.

The proposed temple was never built on the site and the Latter Day Saints were ultimately driven out of Missouri. After this, legal title to the property became a matter of dispute, with three separate theories of who inherited legal title to the property. The Church of Christ (Temple Lot) (the "Hedrickites") ultimately found themselves in possession of the most prominent 2.5-acre (10,000 m^{2}) portion of the 63.5 acres (257,000 m^{2}) Bishop Partridge had purchased in 1831. On April 7, 1884, a Hedrickite conference authorized construction of a "house of worship" on the property, and on April 6, 1887, a building committee was formed and authorized by conference vote to immediately begin construction of the building. At their October 6, 1889 conference, the Hedrickites noted completion of the small church building on the northeast corner of the property, but no building was constructed on the exact site believed to have been designated for the temple—the central part of the sparsely-wooded field.

== Pre-trial dispute ==
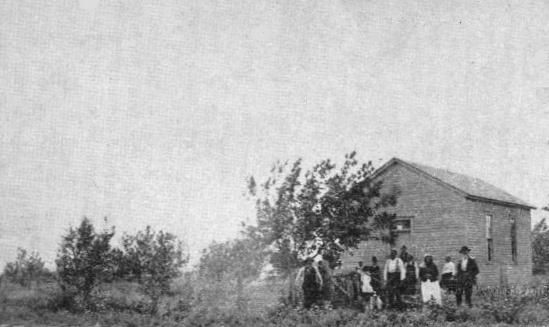
The first house of worship erected on the "Hedrickite" Temple Lot, begun in April 1887 and completed in 1888 or 1889. Construction of this building prompted the "Temple Lot Suit" 1891-1896.

Observing lumber and other building materials rapidly accumulating on the site, on June 11, 1887, the RLDS Church served written notice to the Church of Christ (Temple Lot) to "cease and desist" performing any construction on the disputed site. However, construction continued and media reports of the day indicate that a habitable structure was in place as early as that summer of 1887. On September 10, 1888, visiting elders from the Utah-based the Church of Jesus Christ of Latter-day Saints (LDS Church) were welcomed and invited to lecture in the building, which apparently was completed by that time.

== Trial ==
On August 6, 1891, the RLDS Church filed suit in the United States District Court for the Western District of Missouri claiming equitable title to the Temple Lot, which was under the control by the Temple Lot church. After Joseph Smith's death, the Latter Day Saint movement had splintered into a number of separate churches; Smith's son Joseph Smith III was the president of the RLDS Church and claimed that the RLDS Church was the rightful successor to the original Latter Day Saint church. The Temple Lot church originally claimed the property on the basis of legal title, but later in the case also argued that it was entitled to the land as the rightful successor of the original church. The Utah-based LDS Church also participated in the case, providing funds and legal advice to the Hedrickites.

Perhaps to bolster their legal claim to the property, a Hedrickite conference announced Sunday, April 9, 1893 that construction of a long-awaited Latter-day Saint Temple would begin on the disputed property. Evidently on advice of their attorney, however, the strategy was abandoned, and soon forgotten in the confusion of rumors. The Chicago Tribune reported:

MORMONS TO BUILD AT INDEPENDENCE.
A Temple Will Be Erected on a Site Selected by the Angels Years Ago.

Kansas City, MO., April 9 [Special]. In Independence, Mo., are two strong branches of the Mormon Church -- "the reorganized church," or followers of young Joseph Smith, and the "Hedrickites," or those who followed William [sic] Hedrick at the time Brigham Young took up the reins of government. The former faction is the stronger in numbers in this county, having 700 members in Independence. They fight the Brigham Young crowd on every hand. The "Hedrickites" on the contrary apparently favor the Utah faction and consequently are always fighting the Reorganized church. In the City of Independence a beautiful lot, over a block of the best ground, high up was selected years ago by angels, so they say, and Joseph Smith was told in a revelation in 1833 [sic] that the design of heaven was that the church come to Independence, get this particular lot, and make it their Zion. History tells how they went there even before the death of their prophet and how they left post haste shortly after with the mob close behind. This lot was taken possession of at that time and still remains unoccupied save by the meeting house of the Hedrick faction, who are holding it as the representatives of the true Mormon Church. Today it was decided by the trustees that a costly temple would be built there. The Utah Mormons are behind the move.

After days of hearings which commenced February 7, 1894, the trial court ruled in March 1894 that the RLDS Church was the rightful successor to the original Latter Day Saint church, and that as such it was entitled to ownership of the property. The court also held that the doctrine of laches did not apply since the Latter Day Saints had been driven out of Missouri and were therefore unable to assert their rights to the property.

== Appeal ==
The Church of Christ (Temple Lot) appealed the trial court's decision to the United States Court of Appeals for the Eighth Circuit. The appeals court disagreed with the trial court on the issue of laches, suggesting that the RLDS Church had unnecessarily delayed in asserting its rights over the property, and that in any case the legal title claims of the Hedrickites were probably superior to those of the RLDS Church. However, rather than reversing the decision of the trial court, the appeals court dismissed the case from the courts entirely, which meant that the controversy stood as though no case had ever been brought. In the result, the Hedrickites remained in possession of the Temple Lot by default.

The RLDS Church requested a second hearing by the Court of Appeals en banc but the motion was dismissed. The RLDS Church then sought to appeal the decision to the United States Supreme Court, but that court denied certiorari, which brought the case to a close.

== Reactions ==
Leaders of the RLDS Church widely interpreted the result of the case as a technical vindication of the church's claim as being the rightful successor to the original Latter Day Saint church. Joseph Smith III and his successor, Israel A. Smith, both argued that the RLDS Church had been denied title to the Temple Lot merely because of the doctrine of laches, and that the courts had confirmed that otherwise their title was superior. The Temple Lot church has consistently maintained that the case stands as the final validation of their right to possess the Temple Lot. The LDS Church, although it assisted the Hedrickites in the case, has not taken an official position on the outcome of the case.

== Impact ==
The case became an important source for documents related to Mormon plural marriage. To counteract RLDS claims to be the true successors to Joseph Smith Jr., the LDS Church assisted by having women give court testimony about their polygamist relationships with him.

== See also ==
- Kirtland Temple Suit
