= Temple Lot =

First Latter Day Saints temple location

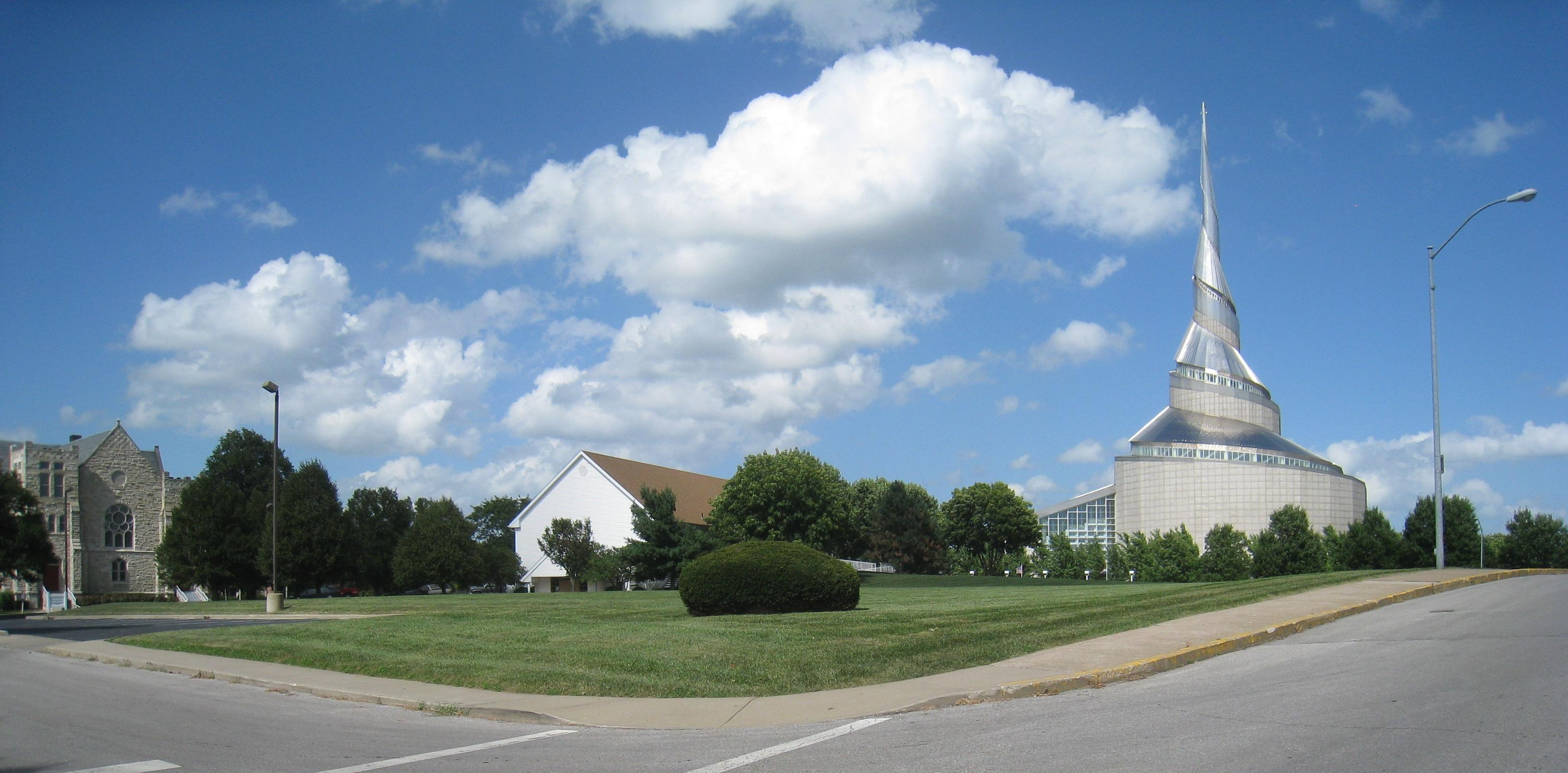
- The Temple Lot in Independence, Missouri, with Church of Christ (Temple Lot) headquarters in white frame building just to the left of center; Community of Christ temple and Stone Church to the right and far left, respectively (circa 2010).

Religion
- Affiliation: Church of Christ (Temple Lot), Community of Christ (formerly RLDS)
- Year consecrated: 1831 (195 years ago)

Location
- Location: 200 South River Boulevard, Independence, Missouri, U.S.
- Interactive map of Temple Lot
- Coordinates: 39.090678°N 94.427968°W

Architecture
- Groundbreaking: 1831 (195 years ago) (cornerstones laid by Joseph Smith)
- Completed: Never completed
- Site area: 63.27 acres (25.60 ha)

Website
- co-owned by churchofchrist1830.org, communityofchrist.org

The Temple Lot is a parcel of land located in Independence, Missouri, which is an important site in the history of the Latter Day Saint movement as the first location dedicated to the construction of a temple. The Temple Lot was also the subject of a lawsuit filed on August 6, 1891 between several of the factions with ties to the original church as founded on April 6, 1830.

The land, about 63-acre (25 ha) in total, was purchased on December 19, 1831, by Edward Partridge to be the center of the New Jerusalem or "City of Zion" after Joseph Smith said he received a revelation stating the site would be the gathering spot of the Latter Day Saints during the last days. Smith dedicated the area on August 3, 1831. Ownership of the property is largely split between two Latter Day Saint denominations: Church of Christ (Temple Lot) and the Community of Christ (formerly the Reorganized Church of Jesus Christ of Latter Day Saints, or RLDS)

The smaller 2.5-acre (1.0 ha) section of the Temple Lot is an open, grass-covered field occupied in its northeast corner by a few trees and the headquarters of the Church of Christ (Temple Lot), though adherents of this sect do not regard their headquarters as a temple. No other structures exist on this grassy field (with the exception of monuments, markers and signposts). The larger 61-acre (25 ha) portion of the property is owned mainly by the Community of Christ, and many prominent structures are located on this land or nearby, including United Nations Peace Plaza, the Community of Christ Auditorium, the Truman Railroad Depot, the LDS Visitors Center, the Community of Christ Temple, a stake center of the Church of Jesus Christ of Latter-day Saints (LDS Church), and the Six Nations Tree of Peace.

== Overview ==
The city of Independence, Missouri, became important to the Latter Day Saint movement starting in the autumn of 1830, only a few months after the religion was incorporated in the state of New York in April 1830. The movement's founder, Joseph Smith, said he received revelations designating this city as the "Center Place" of "Zion", and many early adherents apparently believed that the Garden of Eden had been located there—including later LDS Church leaders Brigham Young and Heber C. Kimball, who said he was told this by Smith. Alexander Majors, who was a sixteen-year-old resident of Independence in 1831, wrote in his memoirs:

Nothing of very great note occurred in the county of Jackson, after the cyclone of 1826, until the year 1830, when five Mormon elders made their appearance in the county and commenced preaching, stating to their audiences that they were chosen by the priesthood which had been organized by the prophet Joseph Smith...They selected a place near Independence, Jackson County, Mo., in the early part of the year 1831 which they named Temple Lot, a beautiful spot of ground on a high eminence. They there stuck down their Jacob's staff, as they called it, and said: "This spot is the center of the earth. This is the place where the Garden of Eden, in which Adam and Eve resided, was located, and we are sent here according to the directions of the angel that appeared to our prophet, Joseph Smith, and told him this is the spot of ground on which the New Jerusalem is to be built, and, when finished, Christ Jesus is to make his reappearance and dwell in this city of New Jerusalem with the saints for a thousand years, at the end of which time there will be a new deal with reference to the nations of the earth, and the final wind-up of the career of the human family."

Since Smith never issued an official revelation to the effect that Independence and the Temple Lot were the site of the Garden of Eden, Latter Day Saints (other than some adherents of the LDS Church) traditionally do not formally accept this claim as doctrine. While Smith later issued a revelation indicating a spot named Adam-ondi-Ahman (fifty miles to the north of Independence) as the place Adam and Eve went to after being expelled from the Garden, he never officially confirmed or denied the idea that Independence had been the location of Eden itself.

Although Smith had designated the Temple Lot site as the heart of his new City of Zion, the Latter Day Saints were expelled from Jackson County (late 1833) and later from Missouri (early 1839) before a temple could be constructed. Ownership of the property later became the subject of court challenges among some sects of the Latter Day Saint movement that arose from the succession crisis following Smith's assassination, most notably between the Church of Christ (Temple Lot) and the Reorganized Church of Jesus Christ of Latter Day Saints (RLDS Church). In 1891, the RLDS Church, presided over by Smith's son Joseph Smith III, sued in the United States District Court for the Western District of Missouri to take possession of the property. It won in that court, but lost in the United States Court of Appeals. The United States Supreme Court refused to review the case.

The Church of Christ (Temple Lot) building, seen in 2021 from the Temple Lot

The Temple Lot is owned by the small Church of Christ (Temple Lot), which acquired the land in 1867. This organization made a failed effort in 1929 to build a temple of its own on the property, which has been the only attempt to erect such a structure since the time of Joseph Smith. This body has its headquarters on the site, which has twice been damaged by arson attacks. The Temple Lot church has insisted since about 1976 (when final attempts at conciliation by the RLDS Church took place) that it will not cooperate with other Latter Day Saint or Christian denominations in building a temple, nor will it sell the Lot, regardless of any price that might conceivably be offered. Some members of other Latter Day Saint groups have described the Temple Lot church as "'squatters' on the location," but that organization steadfastly defends its right to possess the property as its physical and spiritual "custodian".

The Community of Christ (formerly the RLDS Church), the second-largest church within the modern Latter Day Saint movement, owns the bulk of the original 63-acre (25 ha) property around the Temple Lot, often referred to as the greater Temple Lot. This land had been purchased in the 1830s by Latter Day Saint bishop Edward Partridge to be the central common and sacred area according to the Plat of Zion. It maintains its world headquarters in this area, opening its Auditorium to the south of the Lot in 1958, while in 1994 it dedicated its Independence Temple just to the east.

The LDS Church operates an interpretive visitors' center one block east and south of the Temple Lot. It also maintains a stake center, LDS Social Services center, and mission headquarters on its portion of the greater Temple Lot.

== Early history ==
=== Site selection ===
Stone from the Southeast Corner of the Temple and a "witness marker" for the cornerstone on the northeast corner on exhibit in the Temple Lot museum. The witness marker has a "surveyor 4" (backward numeral "4") to differentiate it from a "9" The stone refers to being 40 feet (12 m) from the cornerstone.

In March 1831, Joseph Smith said he had a revelation which stated that a New Jerusalem was to be established in the United States. In June 1831, Smith said he had a second revelation that the New Jerusalem was to be established somewhere on the western border of Missouri, "on the borders by the Lamanites [Native Americans]". Independence is six miles (10 km) east of Kaw Point on the Missouri–Kansas border, which formed the north–south line west of which all tribes were to be removed in the Indian Removal Act of 1830.

On July 20, 1831, Smith presented another revelation on the subject, with more precise details:

"[T]he land of Missouri ... is the land which I have appointed and consecrated for the gathering of the saints: wherefore this is the land of promise, and the place for the city of Zion. ... Behold the place which is now called Independence is the center place, and the a spot for the temple is lying westward upon a lot which is not far from the court house: wherefore it is wisdom that the land should be purchased by the saints; and also every tract lying westward, even unto the line [the Missouri-Kansas border] running directly between Jew [Native Americans] and Gentile. And also every tract bordering by the prairies, inasmuch as my disciples are enabled to buy lands. Behold this is wisdom, that they may obtain it for an everlasting inheritance.

Smith's vision of acquiring every tract of land between Independence and the Kansas border would draw the ire of non–Latter Day Saint settlers throughout Jackson County, including downtown Kansas City.

On August 3, 1831, Smith, Cowdery, Sidney Rigdon, Peter Whitmer Jr., Frederick G. Williams, W. W. Phelps, Martin Harris, and Joseph Coe laid a stone as the northeast cornerstone of the anticipated temple. On December 19, 1831, Edward Partidge purchased 63 acres (250,000 m^{2}), including the Temple Lot. During the purchase, Smith was to reveal: "The temple shall be reared in this generation, for verily this generation shall not pass away until an house shalt be built unto the Lord and a cloud shall rest upon it." Because no temple at this location has ever been built, Smith's prediction that a temple would be reared "in this generation" has stirred debate.

=== Temple plans ===
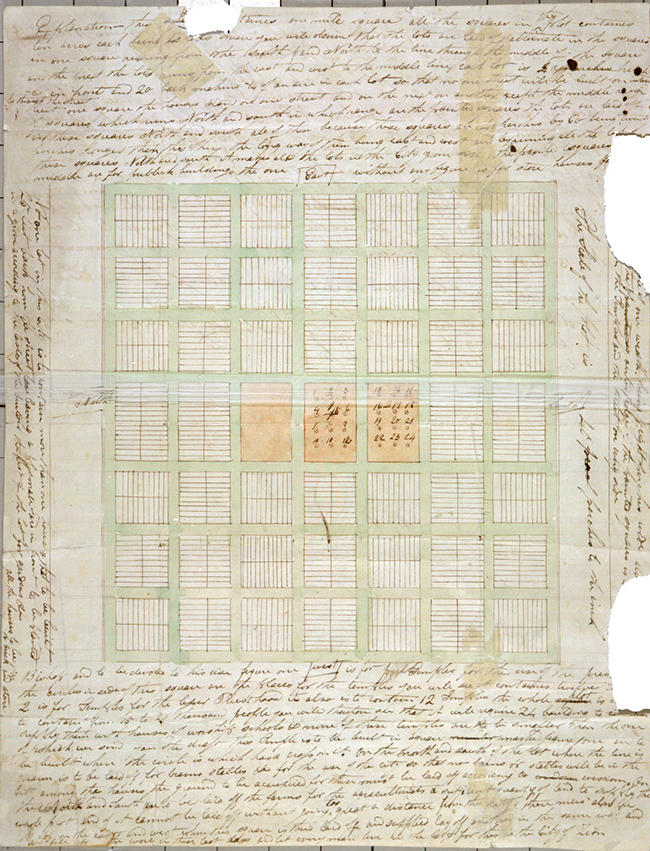
The Plat of Zion showing the temple as the central location of the community. Most cities with Latter Day Saint roots (including Salt Lake City, Utah, and Mesa, Arizona) were to follow the grid portion of this layout

In June 1833, Smith set out the Plat of Zion, which laid out how the community was to be structured. At the center of the planned city were to be 24 "temples" — 12 for the high priesthood and 12 for lesser priesthood. The specific name for the temple to be built on Temple Lot was "The House of the Lord for the Presidency" which had the following description:

The house of the Lord for the Presidency, is eighty-seven feet long and sixty-one feet wide, and ten feet taken off of the east end for the stairway, leaves the inner court, seventy-eight feet by sixty-one, which is calculated and divided for seats in the following manner, viz: the two aisles four feet wide each; the middle block of pews are eleven feet ten inches long, and three feet wide each; and the two lines drawn through the middle are four inches (102 mm) apart; in which space a curtain is to drop at right angles, and divide the house into four parts if necessary. The pews of the side blocks are fourteen and a half feet long, and three feet wide. The five pews in each corner of the house, are twelve feet six inches long. The open spaces between the corner and side pews are for fireplaces; those in the west are nine feet wide, and the east ones are eight feet and eight inches (203 mm) wide, and the chimneys carried up in the wall where they are marked with a pencil.

...

Make your house fourteen feet high between the floors. There will not be a gallery but a chamber; each story to be fourteen feet high, arched overhead with an elliptic arch. Let the foundation of the house be of stone; let it be raised sufficiently high to allow of banking up so high as to admit of a descent every way from the house, so far as to divide the distance between this house, and the one next to it. On the top of the foundation, above the embankment, let there be two rows of hewn stone, and then commence the brick-work on the hewn stone. The entire height of the house is to be twenty-eight feet, each story being fourteen feet; make the wall a sufficient thickness for a house of this size. The end view represents five windows of the same size as those at the side, the middle window excepted, which is to be the same, with the addition of side lights. This middle window is designed to light the rooms both above and below, as the upper floor is to be laid off in the same way as the lower one, and arched overhead; with the same arrangement of curtains, or veils, as before mentioned. The doors are to be five feet wide, and nine feet high, and to be in the east end of the house. The west end is to have no doors, but in other respects is to be like the east, except the windows are to be opposite the alleys which run east and west. The roof of the house is to have one-fourth pitch, the door to have Gothic top, the same as the windows. The shingles of the roof to be painted before they are put on. There is to be a fanlight, as you see. The windows and doors are all to have venetian blinds. A belfry is to be in the east end, and a bell of very large size.

Revised temple plans (ca Aug-Sep 1833)
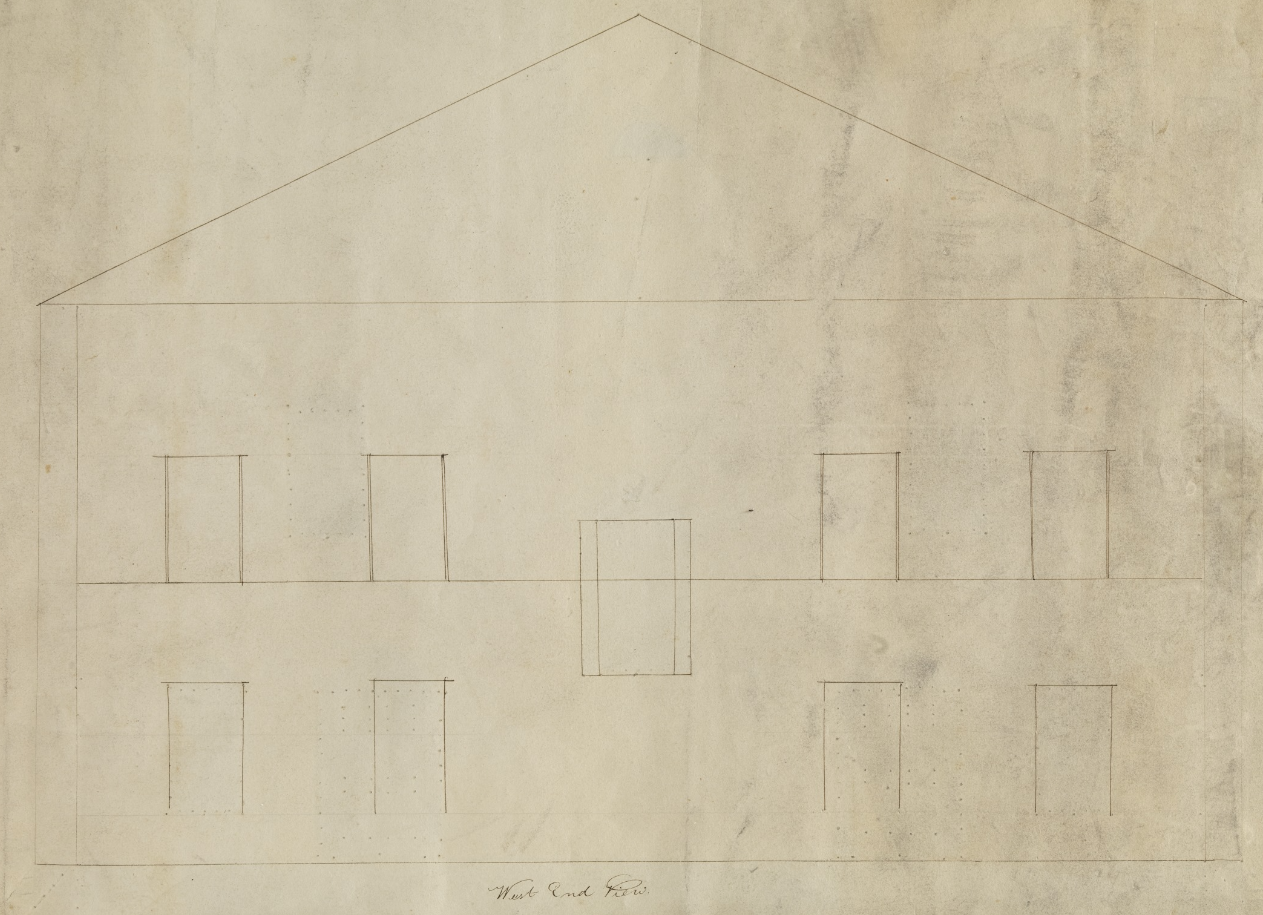
West end view

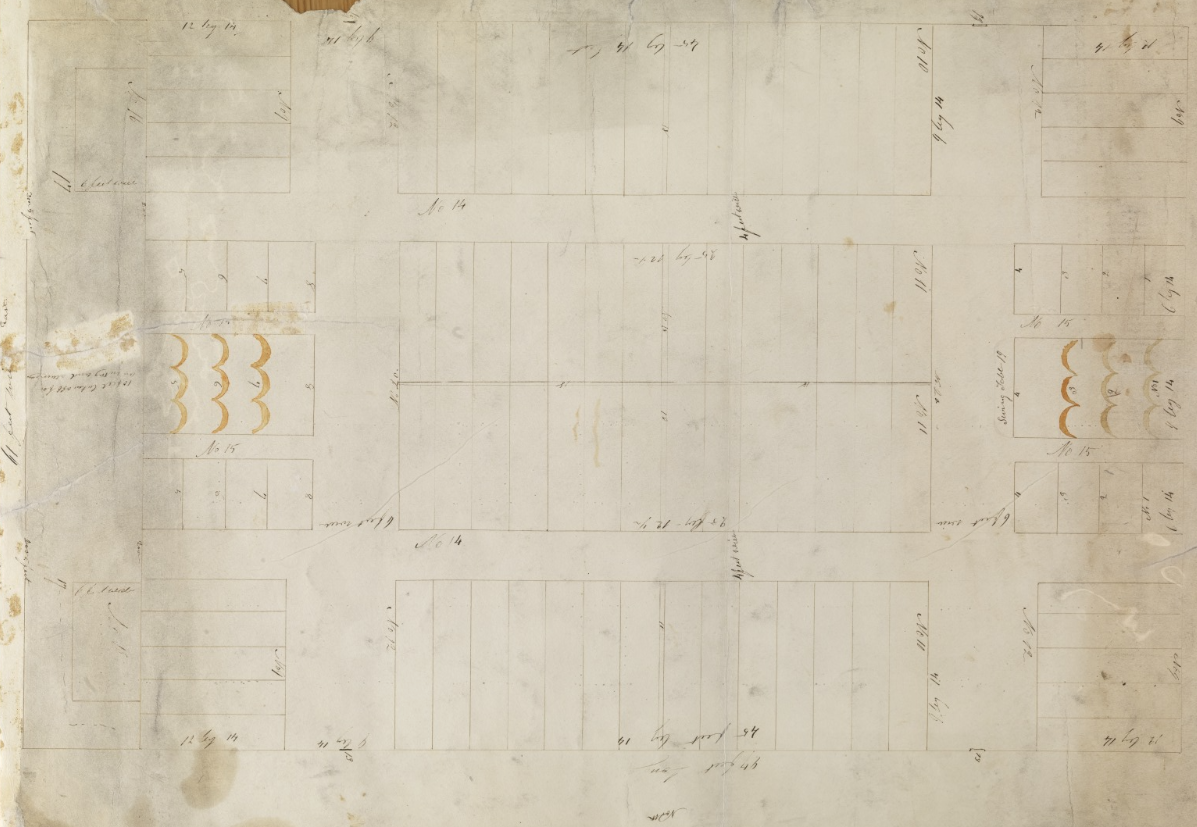
Interior

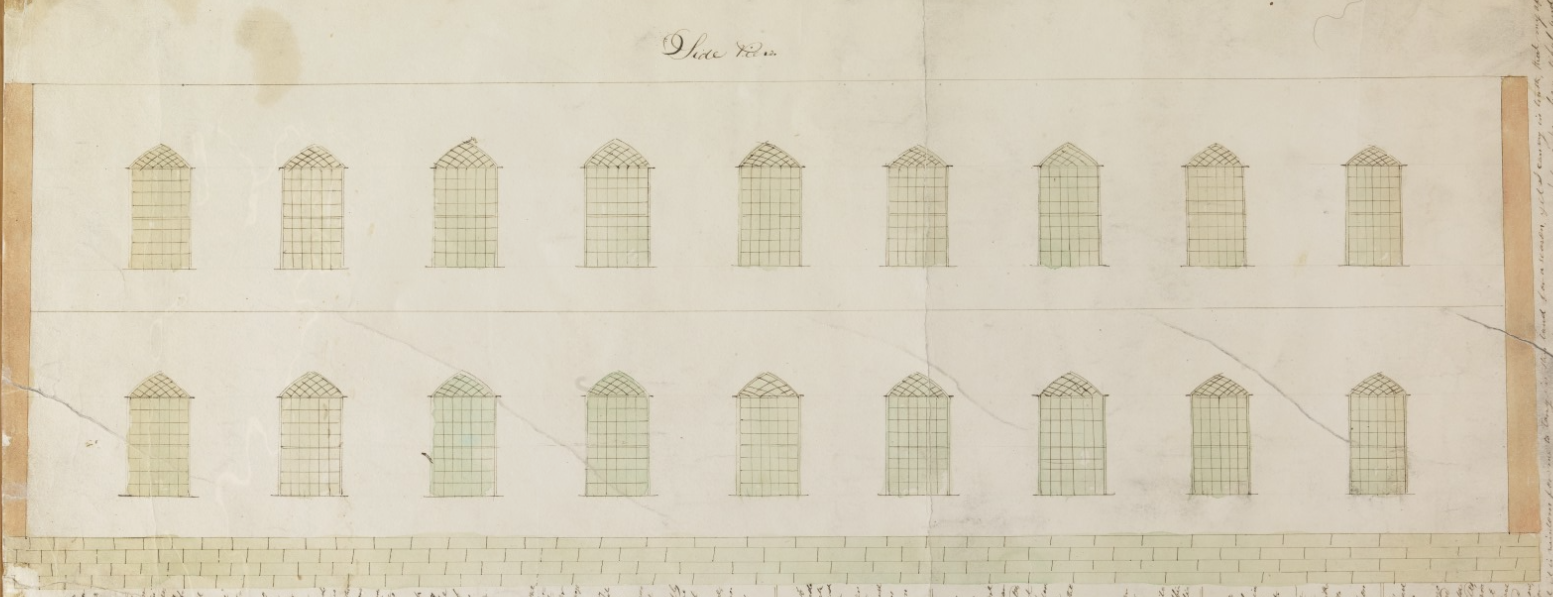
Side view

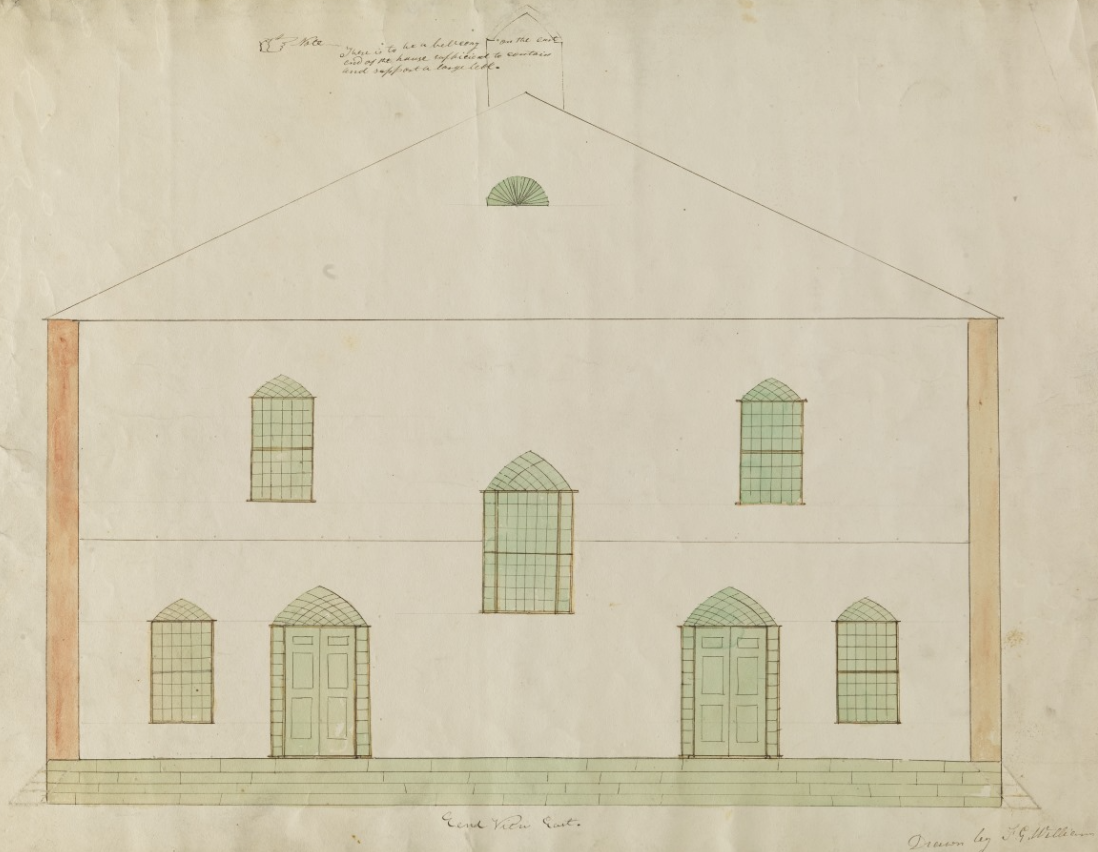
East end view
These plans are an update to original plans created in June 1833 which were "incorrect in some respects; being drawn in grate haste"

=== Eviction from Jackson County ===
In July 1833, Mormon leader W. W. Phelps published a copy of a Missouri law setting out requirements for free blacks to come to Missouri in The Evening and the Morning Star, a prominent Mormon newspaper. The Latter Day Saints had been experiencing considerable friction with their neighbors in Jackson County prior to this event, but Phelps's publication proved to be the last straw for many non-Mormons in the area—most particularly slaveowners. Enraged that the Mormons were apparently bent upon showing blacks that there was an alternative to slavery in Missouri, they burned the newspaper plant and tarred and feathered Bishop Edward Partridge and church Elder Charles Allen. The process set in motion by this event would end with Latter Day Saints being evicted from Independence and the surrounding Jackson County area later that year.

The Latter Day Saints moved across the Missouri River to Clay County, Missouri, where they retained David Rice Atchison as their attorney to settle claims on their real estate in Jackson County. The Mormons would relocate again to Caldwell County, Missouri, with its county seat at Far West, before being expelled from Missouri altogether in the 1838 Mormon War. In March 1839, Smith—whose surrender to the State Militia at Far West ended the conflict—told his followers to "sell all the land in Jackson county, and all other lands in the state whatsoever". The Temple Lot was sold to Martin Harris, but Harris did not record the deed.

=== Legend of the ancient Indian rocks pile ===
A legend prevalent amongst membership of the Church of Christ (Temple Lot) is that an ancient convocation of Native Americans took place at the eventual site of the Temple Lot, and representatives of different tribes each left a stone on a pile. A description of this legend was published in 2015 in two installments of the church publication Zion's Advocate.

== Post-Smith era ==
=== Attempted assassination of Lilburn Boggs ===
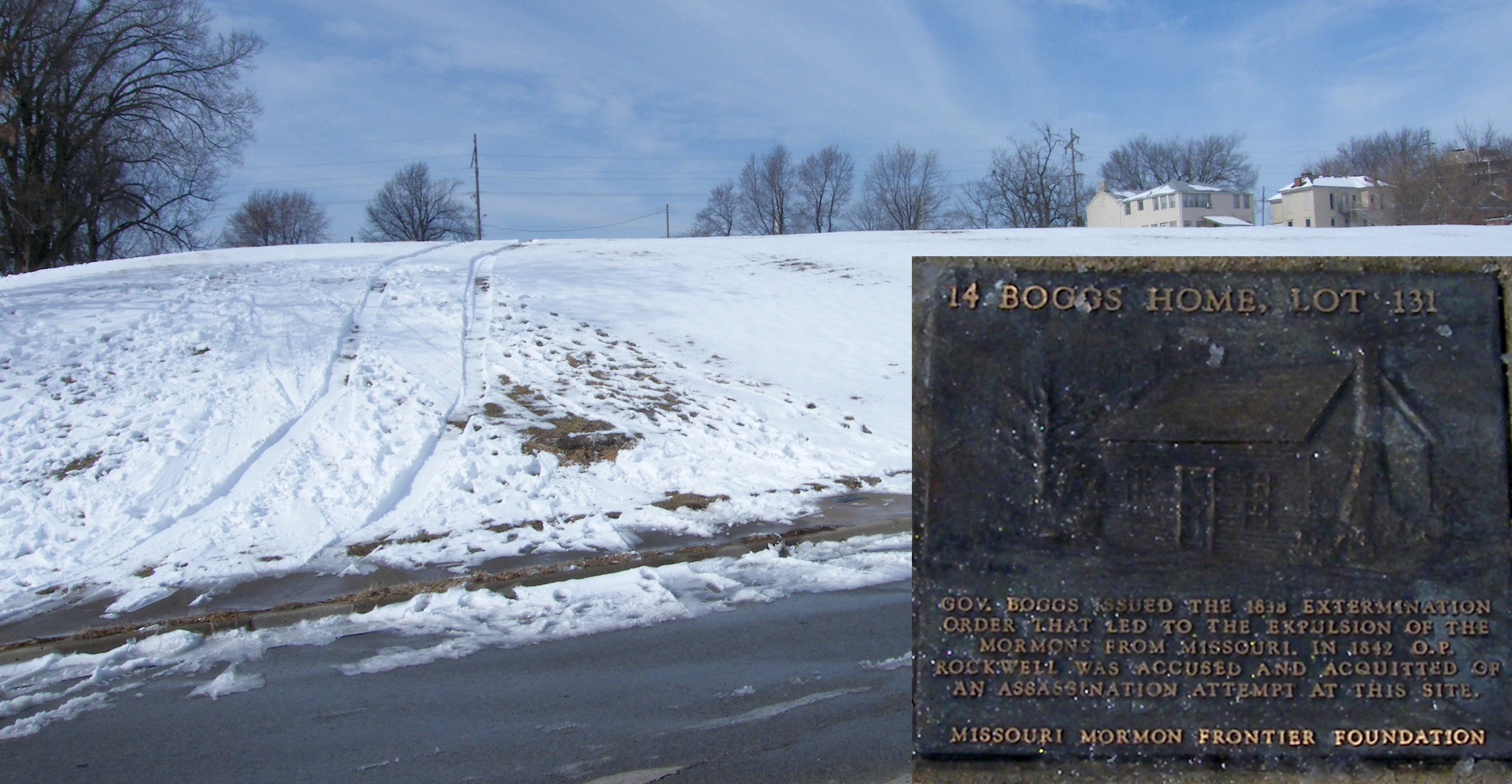
Site of Boggs home on the Mormon Walking Tour with an inset blow up of the marker. The marker is on a cleared area of the sidewalk to the left of the blow up. The Independence Temple steeple is visible through the trees at the top of the hill.

Lilburn Boggs, Governor of Missouri during the Mormon War, lived in Independence prior to that conflict. Boggs was widely perceived as a vehement "anti-Mormon", having issued his "extermination order" in the fall of 1838, and the Latter Day Saints blamed him for much of the difficulties and sorrows they had been forced to endure. Following the war, and after he left office, Boggs settled in a house located three blocks east of Temple Lot on the City of Zion plot. On the evening of May 6, 1842, while sitting in his home, he was shot in the head by an unknown assailant. Though badly wounded, Boggs survived. Mormons were suspected, and Smith associate Porter Rockwell was arrested for the crime, but no convictions ever came in the case.

=== Acquisition by the Hedrickites ===
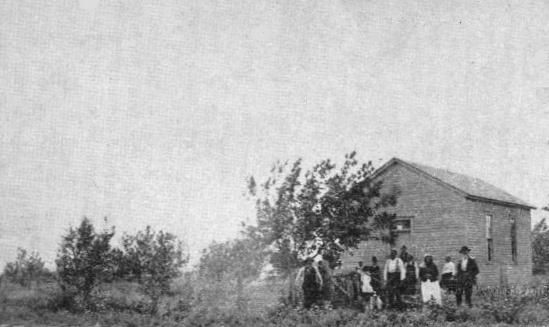
First Hedrickite meetinghouse on the Temple lot

Joseph Smith was assassinated in Carthage, Illinois, in June 1844. On April 6, 1845, apostle Brigham Young expressed the desire to reassert church control of the Temple Lot: "And when we get into Jackson county to walk in the courts of that house, we can say we built this temple: for as the Lord lives we will build up Jackson county in this generation." He did not act on this desire at the time, since he and most of the other Latter Day Saints were in the process of migrating to the Salt Lake Valley, and they remained uncertain of the attitudes of Jackson County residents toward the possibility of renewed Mormon interest in their area. On April 26, 1848, Young, Heber C. Kimball, Orson Pratt, and Wilford Woodruff debated in Winter Quarters, Nebraska, what they should do about their claim on the property prior to the planned journey to the Salt Lake Valley. Their decision was to accept a $300 quit claim offer on the deed.

In 1847, the city of Independence formally incorporated, with the Temple Lot receiving the legal designation of lots 15 through 22 in the "Woodson and Maxwell Addition". While the main body of Latter Day Saints accompanied Brigham Young to the Salt Lake Valley, other groups remaining in Illinois argued that they should return to Independence to build the temple. The first of these groups to relocate to the area was the diminutive Church of Christ (Temple Lot), also called "Hedrickites", which held its first worship meeting in Independence on March 3, 1867. This was the first time Latter Day Saints had congregated in Independence since November 7, 1833, when they were expelled from the area at gunpoint. Unable to acquire the entire greater Temple Lot due to a lack of funds, this organization managed to purchase the Temple Lot itself, erecting its first house of worship on it in 1882.

On June 9, 1887, the RLDS Church laid claim to the entire 63-acre (250,000 m^{2}) greater Temple Lot, including that portion purchased in 1867 by the Church of Christ (Temple Lot), after acquiring the deed for the property from the heirs of Oliver Cowdery. The only contested portion of the purchase was the Temple Lot itself. In 1891, the RLDS Church sued the Temple Lot church for the title to the land, winning at trial in March 1894 but losing on appeal in a Federal appeals court.

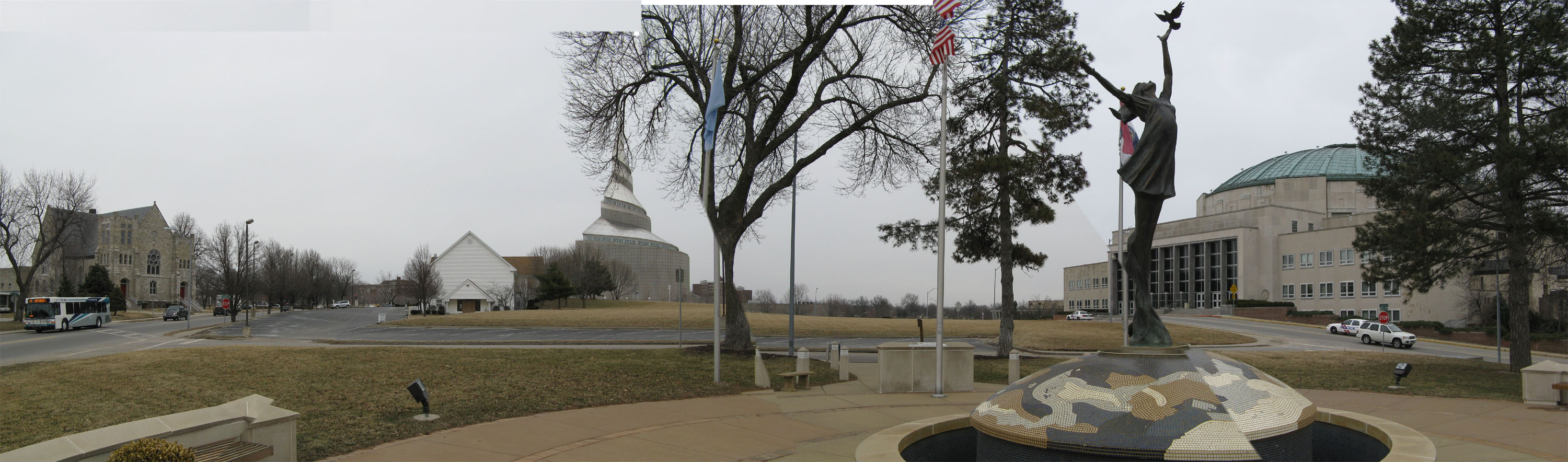
A panoramic view of Temple Lot from the U.N. Plaza to the west. Significant buildings (left to right): Stone Church (a historic congregational building of the Community of Christ), Church of Christ Temple Lot, Community of Christ Temple, Mormon Independence Visitor Center (slightly visible to the left down the hill from the auditorium), Community of Christ Auditorium.

=== Attempts to build a temple ===
On February 4, 1927, Otto Fetting, an apostle of the Church of Christ (Temple Lot), claimed that John the Baptist had visited him at his home as an angel and urged construction of a temple on the Temple Lot. Fetting's claim was officially endorsed by the leading quorum of the church and by most of the laity, and ground was broken on April 6, 1929, with instructions that the temple was to be completed within seven years. The proposed structure was to be 180 feet (55 m) in length 90 feet (27 m) in width. After staking out a portion of the ground, an angel purportedly appeared to say: "The building that you have staked is ten feet too far east, and if you will move the stakes then it shall stand upon the place that has been pointed out by the finger of God." Excavations revealed the stones originally buried by Joseph Smith, in line with the survey markers. These two stones are in the Temple Lot headquarters building, while their original position is marked by two other engraved stones embedded visibly in the lot. The outer corners of the temple are marked by similar stones.

A doctrinal dispute within the Temple Lot organization about baptism ensued later that year, and Fetting was censured by a majority vote of fellow apostles at a church conference in October 1929. Fetting left the Temple Lot church at this time, taking many members with him who eventually founded the Church of Christ (Fettingite) and the Church of Christ with the Elijah Message. Although the Temple Lot church solicited donations for its proposed temple from individuals and even from other Latter Day Saint organizations, little money was forthcoming (none from the other organizations), and construction never progressed beyond excavating for the structure's foundation. This unsightly hole was filled in by the city of Independence in 1946, after the Temple Lot church had finally abandoned all efforts on the project. The Temple Lot church relandscaped the area, which presently comprises a grassy field, with a few trees and the Temple Lot headquarters building at its northeast end. No further plans for construction of a temple on the site have been announced.

=== First arson incident ===
The first meetinghouse constructed on the Temple Lot was the home of Edward Partridge, which served as a schoolhouse, a Sunday meetinghouse, and a Conference Center. It was burned by arson along with an estimated 200 homes belonging to Latter Day Saints on November 5, 1833.

=== Second arson incident ===
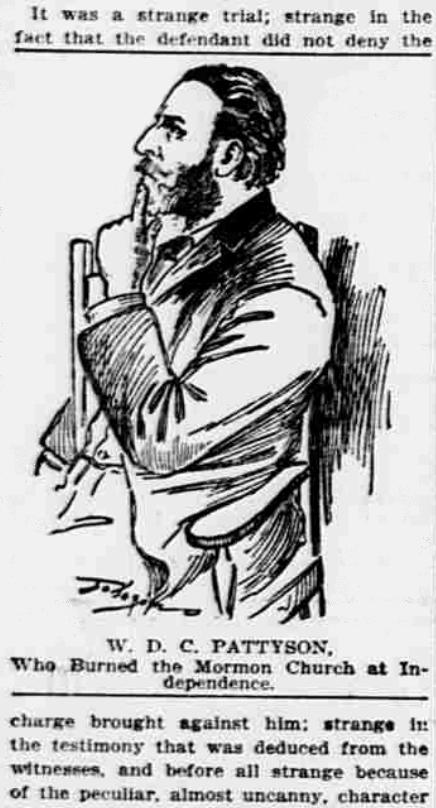
RLDS and Hedrickite member William D.C. Pattyson at his trial in November 1898. Courtroom portrait published in the Kansas City Missouri Journal newspaper on December 1, 1898.

In July 1898, 46-year-old William David Creighton "W.D.C." Pattyson, reportedly a suspended member of the RLDS Church from Boston, Massachusetts, was arrested and briefly detained after attempting to remove a fence placed around the Temple Lot. (Mr. Pattyson had been baptized into the Hedrickite sect in May 1898). According to his detractors in the Temple Lot sect, Pattyson reportedly demanded that church officials sign ownership of the property over to him, claiming he was the "One Mighty and Strong". He was detained by police but then released a few days later. Early on Monday, September 5, 1898, he damaged the tiny headquarters building by setting it afire, and then walked to the police station and turned himself in. After he testified in court appearances in late November and early December 1898, the New York Times claimed Pattyson was found "guilty but insane" and he was sentenced to confinement in a mental institution in St. Joseph, Missouri. According to local news reports and Pattyson's explanations upon his release, he was found "not guilty by reason of insanity" and committed to the mental institution because the sitting Judge felt Pattyson did not deserve criminal incarceration.

=== Third arson incident ===
A man described as a former member set fire to the Temple Lot meetinghouse (itself constructed in 1905 to replace an earlier structure, also damaged by fire) in what he claimed was a political protest on January 1, 1990, damaging the upper floor. The remainder of the building was razed, and a new edifice constructed. This structure serves as the church headquarters, conference site, museum and a meetinghouse for the local Temple Lot congregation.

== Museum ==
A small museum operated by the Temple Lot church is located in the lower story of the headquarters building on the Lot; it contains some of the original stones placed by Joseph Smith to mark the corners of his intended temple, and also offers church books and literature for sale.
