= Granville Hedrick =

American Latter Day Saint leader (1814–1881)

Granville Hedrick (September 2, 1814 – August 22, 1881) was a leader in the Latter Day Saint movement after the 1844 succession crisis. In 1863, Hedrick became the founding leader of the Church of Christ (Temple Lot), which is one of many churches that claim to be a continuation of the Church of Christ founded by Joseph Smith in 1830.

== Latter Day Saint church membership ==
In 1843 at Woodford County, Illinois, Hedrick was baptized into the Church of Jesus Christ of Latter-day Saints by Hervey Green, a missionary for the church. Green also ordained Hedrick to the priesthood office of elder shortly after he was baptized. Soon after his baptism, he became dissatisfied with the church and moved to Galena to work in the lead mines.

After Smith's death in June 1844, a number of Latter Day Saint leaders, including Brigham Young, Sidney Rigdon, and James Strang, claimed to be Smith's rightful successor as leader of the Church of Jesus Christ of Latter Day Saints, which Smith had founded in 1830 as the Church of Christ. Each leadership candidate established rival organizations, each claiming to be the true successor of the church. Sometime after Smith's death, Hedrick was re-baptized into the Church of Jesus Christ of Latter Day Saints by William O. Clark.

Hedrick traveled to Nauvoo, Illinois, to join the body of Latter Day Saints led by Brigham Young. However, he considered the conditions in Nauvoo dangerous and volatile at the time, and instead settled in Crow Creek, Illinois under the spiritual leadership of Gladden Bishop.

== Leadership of unaffiliated branches ==
By the late 1850s, Brigham Young's organizations of Latter Day Saints had moved to Utah, and Sidney Rigdon's organization had dissolved. However, a number of branches of Latter Day Saints in Illinois and Indiana remained. At this time, these branches were not formally affiliated with any Latter Day Saint organization. Among these was a branch of Latter Day Saints in Crow Creek, Illinois, which had been led by Hedrick since April 1857.

In June 1857, Hedrick's branch and Latter Day Saints from other unaffiliated branches gathered for a joint conference. The conference was attended by John E. Page, one of the men who had been an apostle of the church during Joseph Smith's leadership of the church. Following the conference, Page became a supporter of these unaffiliated branches of Latter Day Saints and they continued to gather together for conferences of what they felt was the continuing remnant of the true Church of Christ.

At a May 1863 conference of these branches, Page ordained Hedrick, David Judy, Jedediah Owen, and Adna C. Haldeman to the priesthood office of apostle. At a conference in July 1863, it was proposed that the members of the unaffiliated branches nominate a person to be president of the high priesthood of the church. Page nominated Hedrick, and with the assent of the Latter Day Saints at the conference, Page, Judy, Owen and Haldeman ordained Hedrick to be the president of the high priesthood and a prophet, seer, revelator, and translator to the Church of Christ, all positions which had been held by Joseph Smith. In typical fashion among various factions of the Latter Day Saint movement, believers associated with Hedrick were nicknamed Hedrickites.

== Revelations ==
Within one month of his ordination in mid-July, 1863, Hedrick began to produce revelations stating that the pride of Joseph Smith led him to produce false revelations. As a result, Smith was said to have introduced doctrines to the church that were inconsistent with the word of God as found in the Bible and the Book of Mormon. Hedrick declared Smith to be a "fallen prophet". Eventually, Hedrick decided that among the errors introduced by Smith were the creation of a president of the church and First Presidency of the church. Thereafter, Hedrick repudiated his 1863 ordination to these positions, holding that the true Church of Christ was to be headed only by a presiding elder, an office which was done away with by a vote of apostles in 1925. Other doctrines rejected by Hedrick included plural marriage, celestial marriage, exaltation and plurality of gods, tithing as one-tenth of income, and the existence of the priesthood office of high priest.

== Move to Jackson County, Missouri ==
On April 24, 1864, Hedrick produced a revelation directing his followers to return to Independence in Jackson County, Missouri in 1867 to initiate a re-gathering of Latter Day Saints to the region. Granville's wealthy brother John A. Hedrick and two other families were apparently the first "Mormons" to return to Independence and reside there, John Hedrick purchased a 245-acre (0.99 km^{2}) farm east of the city on October 11, 1865. About sixty Hedrickites moved by covered wagons to Jackson County in February 1867. Hedrick's followers were the first group of Latter Day Saints to return to this area where they had been driven out in the late 1830s by the Missourian "extermination order". Granville Hedrick himself, ironically, did not move to Independence "...until late 1868 or early 1869. Records show that on May 29, 1868, Granville was still in Illinois when he executed a “Power of Attorney” in behalf of his brother John Hedrick..." By 1877, the Hedrickites had purchased the most prominent portion of a plot of land which Joseph Smith and Sidney Rigdon had dedicated in 1831 as the future location of a temple headquartering a "New Jerusalem", a sacred city to be built preparatory to the Second Coming of Jesus Christ. As a result of their ownership over this strategic property—later discovered to contain the buried "marker" stones emplaced by Joseph Smith in 1831—Hedrick's church came to be called the Church of Christ (Temple Lot). The church exists today with a worldwide membership of approximately 5000.

Hedrick died at Independence and was buried at the "Hedrick Cemetery" about three miles (5 km) northeast of the Temple Lot. His widow, Eliza Ann Jones Hedrick, died in Independence on April 6, 1910, and their son James A. Hedrick, who had served as the church's "General Secretary," died in Independence, age 60, on April 22, 1926.

== See also ==
- Temple Lot Case
