= Stone Church (Independence, Missouri) =

Church building in Missouri, United States

Coordinates: 39.0915°N 94.4282°W

The church in 2021, seen from the southwest

The Community of Christ Stone Church (known from 1888 to 2000 as the RLDS Stone Church) is a historic place of worship at 1012 West Lexington Avenue in Independence, Missouri, United States. The limestone building is north across the street from the Church of Christ (Temple Lot) headquarters and diagonally opposite the Community of Christ's Independence Temple.

The Church began construction on the site in 1884, and the completed building was dedicated on April 6, 1888.

From the early 1900s until the dedication of the nearby Community of Christ Auditorium, the Stone Church was the headquarters building of the Reorganized Church of Jesus Christ of Latter Day Saints (as the Community of Christ was then known ). Administrative offices and General Conference meetings were transferred in 1958 to the Auditorium, and in 1994 to the Independence Temple. The structure is still in use today as a regular congregational meeting location and community-outreach programs.

== See also ==
- Lists of church buildings
