= Temple (Latter Day Saints) =

Places of worship in the Latter Day Saint movement

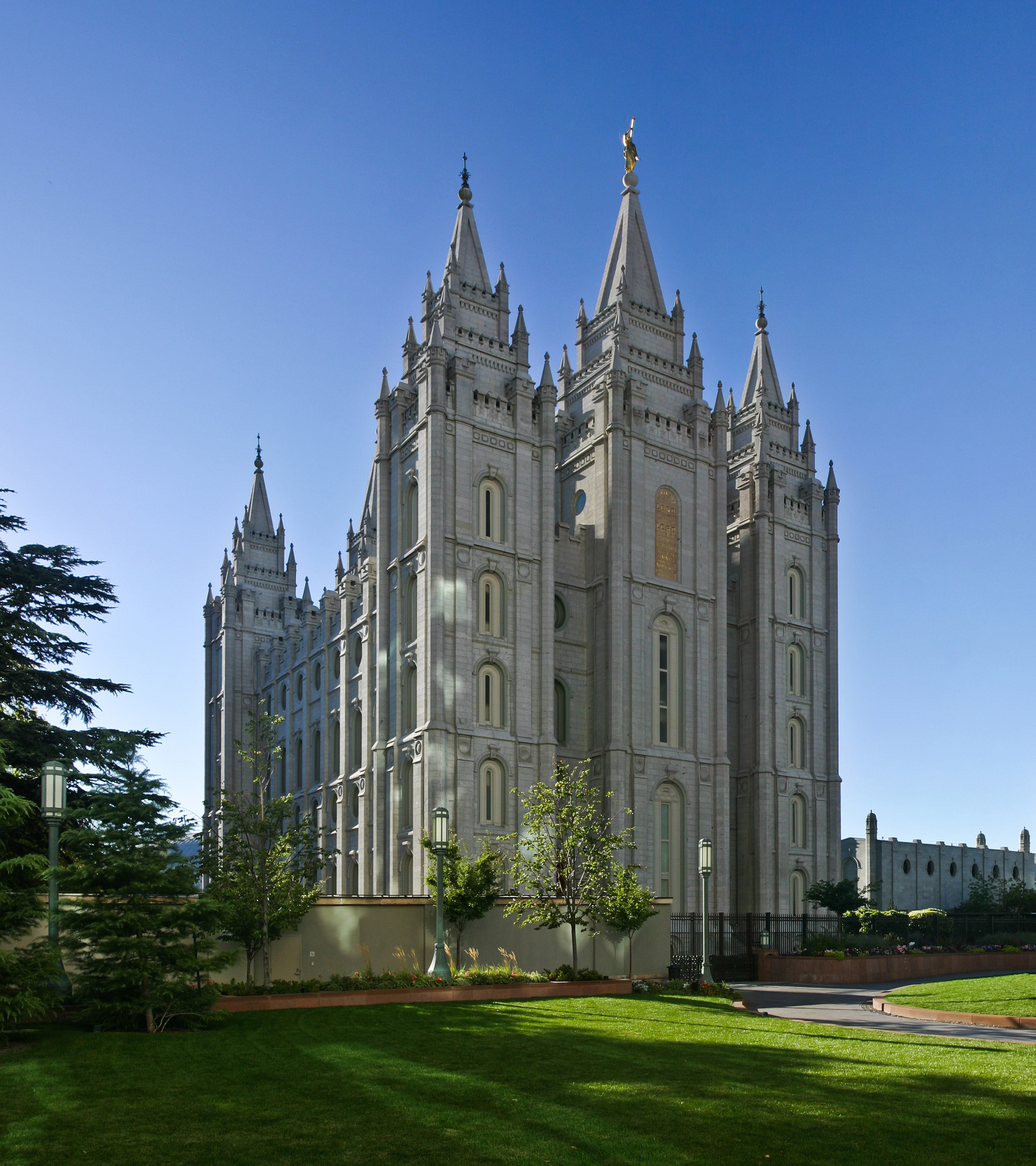
The Salt Lake Temple, operated by the Church of Jesus Christ of Latter-day Saints, is the church's best-known temple. Located in Salt Lake City, Utah, it is the centerpiece of the 10-acre (40,000 m^{2}) Temple Square.

In the Latter Day Saint movement, a temple is a building dedicated to being a house of God and is reserved for special forms of worship. A temple differs from a church meetinghouse, which is used for weekly worship services. Temples have been a significant part of the Latter Day Saint movement since early in its inception. Today, temples are operated by several Latter Day Saint denominations. The most prolific builder of temples of the Latter Day Saint movement is the Church of Jesus Christ of Latter-day Saints (LDS Church).

The LDS Church has 385 temples in various phases, which includes 219 dedicated temples (212 operating, 7 undergoing renovations), 1 additional renovation scheduled (Apia Samoa), 11 with dedications scheduled, 50 under construction, 7 with groundbreaking ceremonies scheduled, and 98 others announced (not yet under construction). Several others within the movement have built or attempted to build temples. The Community of Christ operates one temple in the United States, which is open to the public and used for worship services, performances, and religious education. Other denominations with temples are the Apostolic United Brethren, the Church of Christ, the Fundamentalist Church of Jesus Christ of Latter-Day Saints, and the Righteous Branch of the Church of Jesus Christ of Latter-day Saints.

== History ==
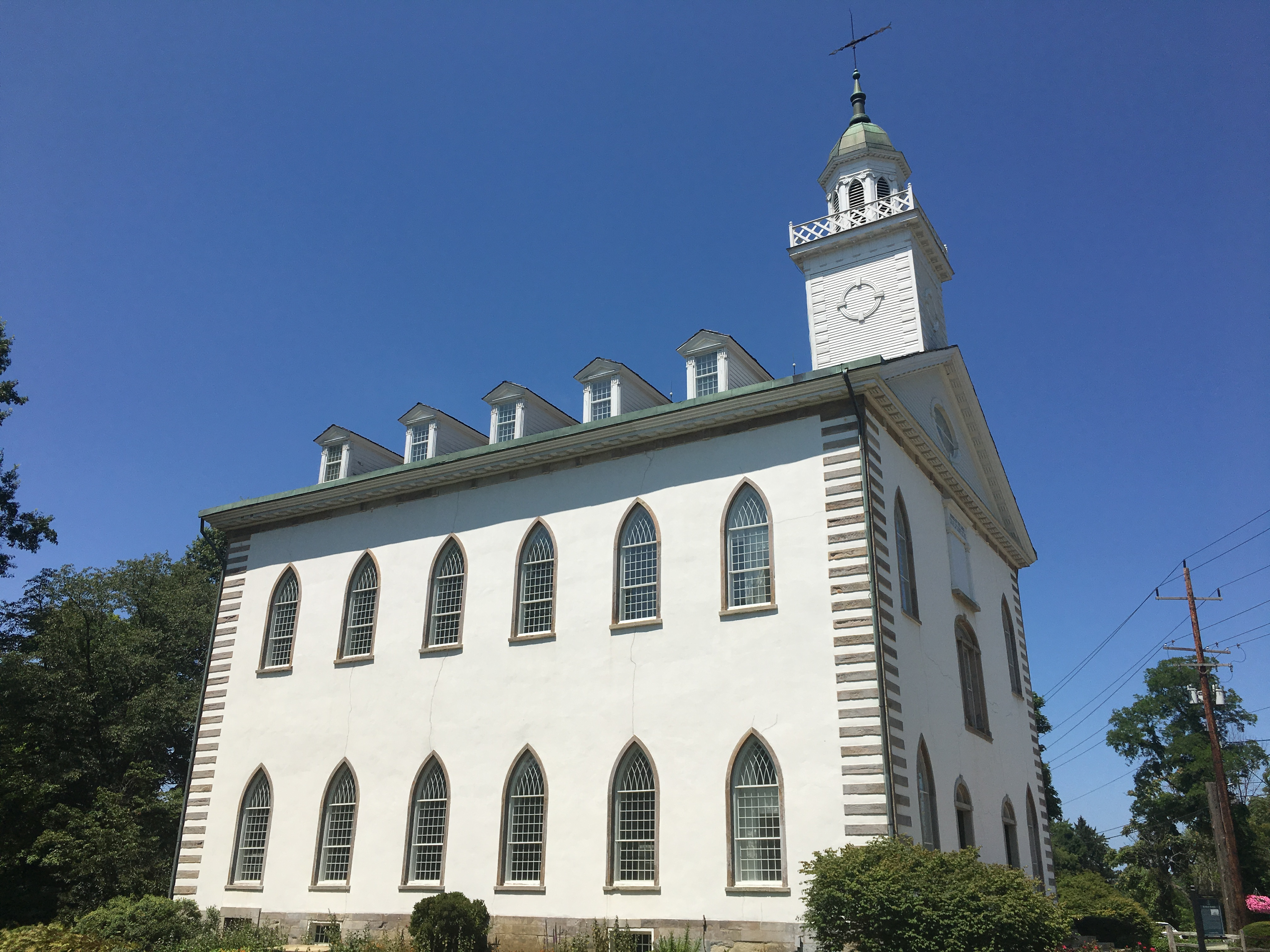
The Kirtland Temple was the first temple of the Latter Day Saint movement and the only temple completed in the lifetime of Joseph Smith

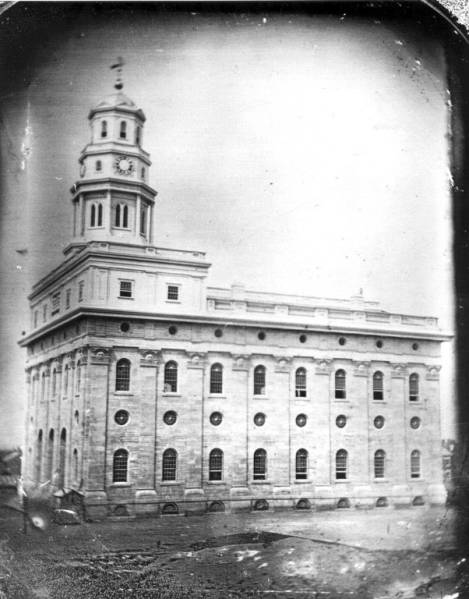
The Nauvoo Temple: built in 1846, destroyed soon after, and rebuilt in 2002

The Latter Day Saint movement was conceived as a restoration of practices believed to have been lost in a Great Apostasy from the true gospel of Jesus Christ. Temple worship played a prominent role in the Bible's Old Testament, and in the Book of Mormon.

On December 27, 1832, two years after the organization of the Church of Christ, the church's founder, Joseph Smith, reported receiving a revelation that called upon church members to restore the practice of temple worship. The Latter Day Saints in Kirtland, Ohio, were commanded to:

"Establish a house, even a house of prayer, a house of fasting, a house of faith, a house of learning, a house of glory, a house of order, a house of God."

Latter Day Saints see temples as the fulfillment of a prophecy found in Malachi 3:1 (KJV): "Behold, I will send my messenger, and he shall prepare the way before me; and the Lord, whom ye seek, shall suddenly come to his temple, even the messenger of the covenant, whom ye delight in: behold, he shall come, saith the Lord of hosts." It is believed to emphasize that when the Jesus comes again, he will come "to his temple."

As plans were drawn up to construct a temple in Kirtland, the decision was made to simultaneously begin work on a second temple at the church's colony in Jackson County, Missouri. Surviving plans indicate that both temples would have the same dimensions and approximately the same appearance and both were to be at the "centerplaces" of cities designed according to Smith's plan for the City of Zion.

Conflict in Missouri led to the expulsion of the Mormons from Jackson County, preventing any possibility of building a temple there, but work on the temple in Kirtland continued. At great cost and sacrifice, the Latter Day Saints finished the Kirtland Temple in early 1836. On March 27, they held a lengthy dedication ceremony and numerous spiritual experiences and visitations were reported.

Conflict relating to the failure of the church's Kirtland Safety Society bank, caused the church presidency to leave Kirtland and move the church's headquarters to the Mormon settlement of Far West, Missouri. Far West was also platted along the lines of the City of Zion plan and in 1838 the church began construction of a new, larger temple in the center of the town. They may also have dedicated a temple site in the neighboring Mormon settlement of Adam-ondi-Ahman. The events of the 1838 Mormon War and the expulsion of the Mormons from Missouri left these attempts at temple-building no further progressed than excavating foundations.

In 1839, the Mormons regrouped at a new headquarters in Nauvoo, Illinois. They were again commanded to build a "House of the Lord"—this one even larger and greater than those that went before. Plans for the temple in Nauvoo followed the earlier models in Kirtland and Independence with lower and upper courts, but the scale was much increased.

New conflicts arose that led to Smith being killed, along with his brother Hyrum, at Carthage Jail on June 27, 1844. The Nauvoo Temple stood only half finished. Eventually, this temple was finished and dedicated. Some temple ordinances were performed before most of the Latter Day Saints followed Brigham Young west across the Mississippi River.

Smith's death resulted in a succession crisis which divided the movement into different sects. The concept of temple worship evolved separately in many of these sects and until the 1990s only the sects claiming a succession through Brigham Young continued to build new temples. In April 1990, the Reorganized Church of Jesus Christ of Latter Day Saints (RLDS Church) began to construct the Independence Temple, which was dedicated in 1994. The RLDS Church—now called the Community of Christ—owned the Kirtland Temple from 1901 to 2024, which it used for worship services and special events but also open to visitors, including various Latter Day Saint denominations interested in the building's historical significance.

In the late 1880s and in 1890, a desire to continue the ordinance work in temples was a significant consideration preceding Wilford Woodruff's decision (announced in his Manifesto of September 1890) that the Church of Jesus Christ of Latter-day Saints would discontinue its practice of polygamy. In 1887 the US Congress passed the Edmunds–Tucker Act, which disincorporated the church and directed federal officials to begin seizing its assets, potentially including its temples. After a conversation with Woodruff, Logan Temple president Marriner W. Merrill stated that the contemplated public announcement prohibiting additional polygamist unions was "the only way to retain the possession of our temples and continue the ordinance work for the living and dead which was considered of more importance than continuing the practice of plural marriage for the present."

== Purposes ==
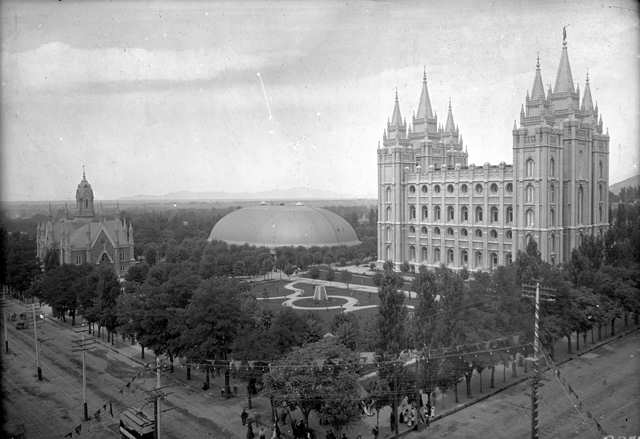
Temple in Salt Lake City on "Temple Square" circa 1897

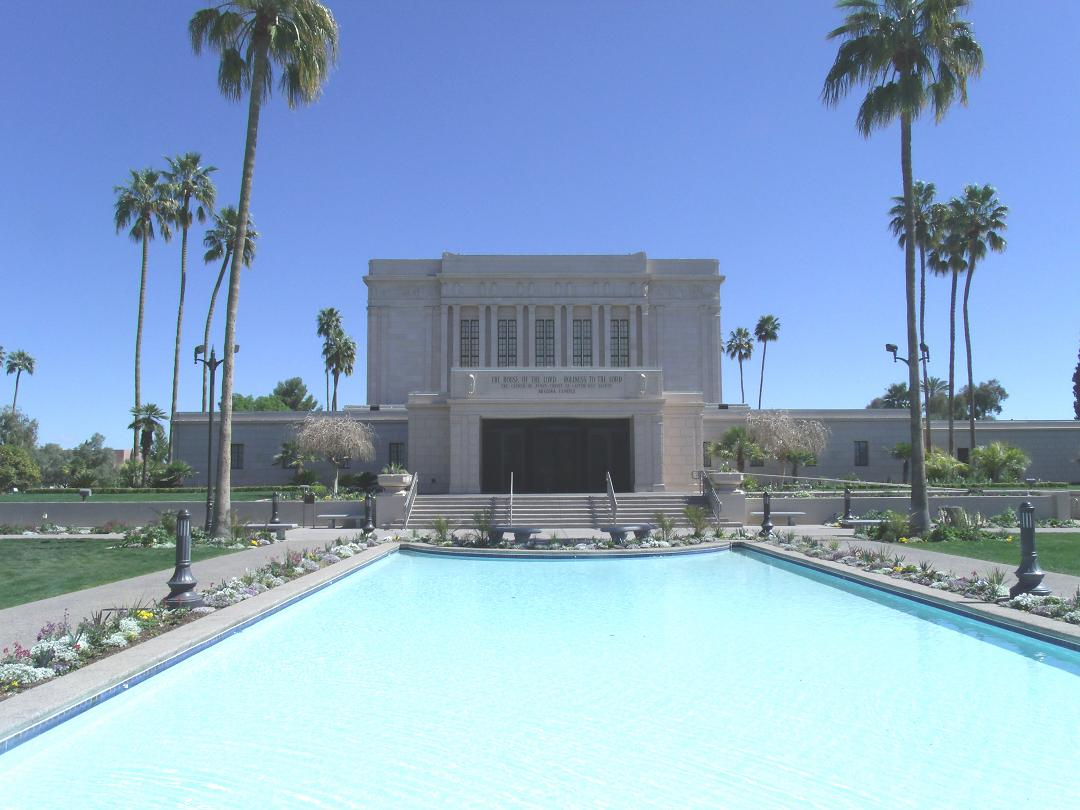
The Mesa Arizona Temple built in 1919

Temples have held numerous purposes in the Latter Day Saint movement, both historically and their differing expressions today. These purposes include:

- A House of the Lord —Smith reported a revelation in 1836 explaining that the recently dedicated Kirtland Temple was built "that the Son of Man might have a place to manifest himself to his people." (Doctrine and Covenants LDS 109:5). All Latter Day Saint denominations with temples still consider them to be special houses of the Lord.
- A House of Learning—The Kirtland Temple housed the "School of the Prophets."
- Center of the City of Zion—Latter Day Saints often view temples as central to the establishment of Zionic communities. Examples include those in Kirtland, the original (unfinished) Independence Temple, the unfinished temples in Far West and Adam-ondi-Ahman, the original Nauvoo Temple, along with the Salt Lake, St. George Utah, Mesa Arizona, Laie Hawaii temples, and others.
- Headquarters of the church—the Kirtland Temple served as the headquarters of the early church from its completion in 1836 through the end of 1837.
- Sacred spaces for special ordinances—Beginning in Nauvoo, temples were spaces in which to perform special ordinances such as the endowment and baptism for the dead—see Ordinance (Mormonism).

== LDS Church ==
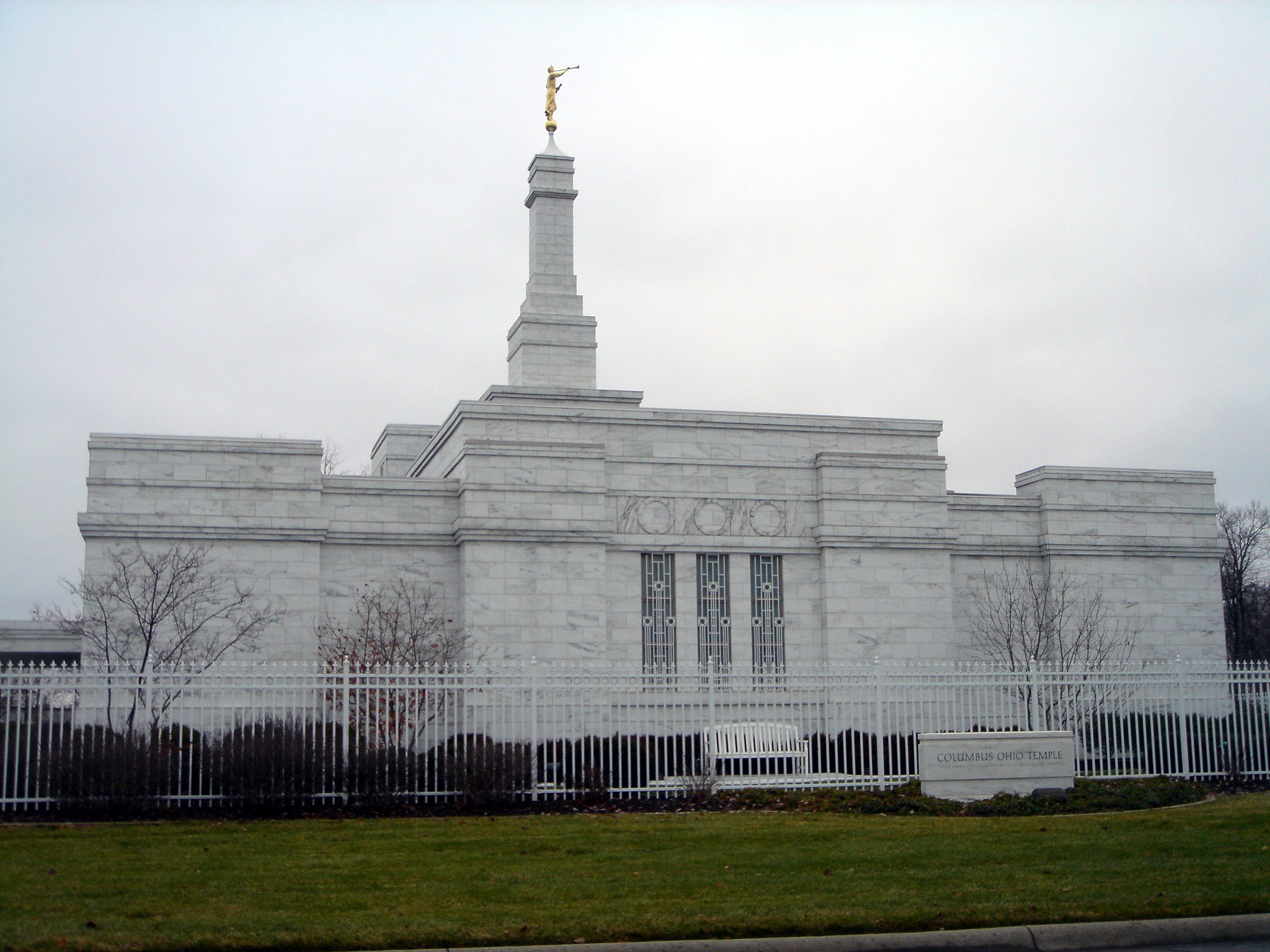
The Columbus Ohio Temple, an example of smaller temples built under Hinckley's direction

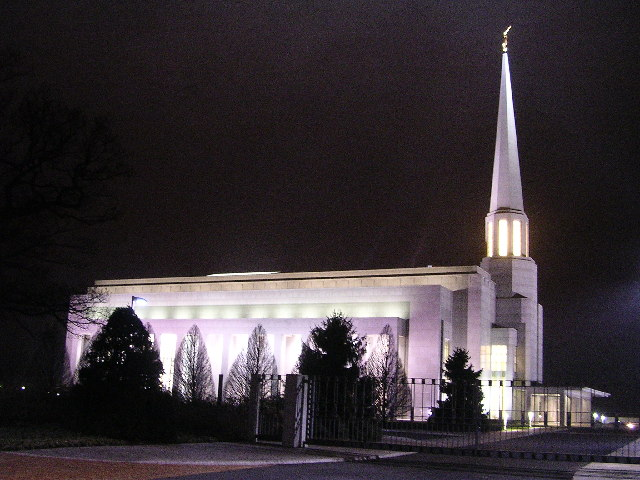
The Preston Temple in the United Kingdom in 2006.

The LDS Church has been the most prolific builder of temples in the Latter Day Saint movement. The LDS Church has 385 temples in various phases, which includes 219 dedicated temples (212 operating, 7 undergoing renovations), 1 additional renovation scheduled (Apia Samoa), 11 with dedications scheduled, 50 under construction, 7 with groundbreaking ceremonies scheduled, and 98 others announced (not yet under construction). In the LDS Church, temples are not only a House of the Lord, but are also where members of the church make covenants and perform sacred ordinances, such as baptism for the dead, washing and anointing (or "initiatory" ordinances), the endowment, and eternal marriage sealings. Ordinances are a vital part of the theology of the church, which teaches that they were practiced by God's covenant people in all dispensations. Additionally, members consider the temple a place to commune with God, seek God's aid, understand the will of God, and receive personal revelation.

Upon completion (or after the completion of significant renovations), temples are open to the public for a period of time (an "open house"). During the open house, the church conducts tours of the temple with missionaries and members from the local area serving as tour guides, and all rooms of the temple are open to the public. The temple is then dedicated as a "House of the Lord", after which only members in good standing are permitted entrance. Thus, in the LDS Church, temples are not churches or meetinghouses but rather places of more consecrated worship.

=== History ===
In 1832, shortly after the formation of the church, Smith said that the Lord desired the Latter Day Saints build a temple; and they completed the Kirtland Temple in 1836. Differing from other churches in the Latter Day Saint tradition, members feel that the first endowment ceremonies were performed in Kirtland, Ohio, although the endowment performed in Kirtland differed significantly from the endowment performed by Smith in Nauvoo. The construction of the Nauvoo Temple and the teaching of the full endowment by Smith are seen as the final steps in restoring the church founded by Jesus Christ following the Great Apostasy. Because it is an integral part of their worship, Mormon pioneers, upon arriving in the Salt Lake Valley, began plans to build temples there, and built the Endowment House to allow members to receive the endowment until the temples were completed.

=== Construction ===
Initially, the church constructed temples in areas where there were large concentrations of members: Utah, Idaho, Arizona, Hawaii, and Alberta. In the mid-20th century, because of the importance of temples in the theology, the church tried to balance density with the travel requirements that attending the temple imposed upon members. Thus, temples were built in Europe (Switzerland–1955 and England–1958); the Pacific Islands (New Zealand–1958); and Washington, D.C. (1974) when membership alone might not have justified the effort.

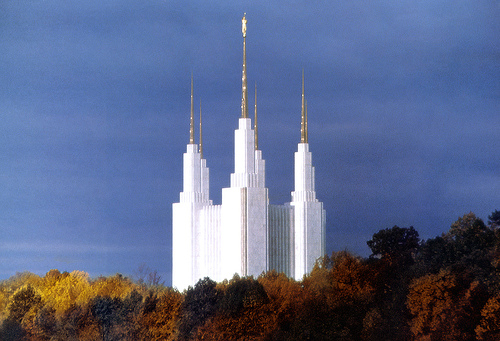
The Washington D.C. Temple viewed while driving south on the Capital Beltway.

Temple growth continued in the 1980s, church president Spencer W. Kimball (1895–1985) directed the church to build smaller temples with similar designs. Before this time, all but the Swiss Temple were at least 45,000 square feet (4,200 m^{2}), and the average size of the first 20 temples was 103,000 square feet (9,570 m^{2}). The new temples varied in size but were generally less than 25,000 square feet (2,300 m^{2}) allowing temples to be built where there were fewer members. As a result, the first temples in South America (Brazil–1978); Asia (Japan–1980); and Latin America (Mexico City–1983) were built and the number of temples doubled from 15 to 36. Church president Gordon B. Hinckley (1910–2008) also accelerated the construction of temples through the use of an even smaller standardized base design and set a goal to have 100 operating temples before 2001. Between the brief building period from 1998 to 2001, 38 of these standardized temples were constructed and dedicated, meeting Hinckley's goal and, during his service as president, the number of temples more than doubled from 47 to 124.

== Church of Jesus Christ (Cutlerite) ==
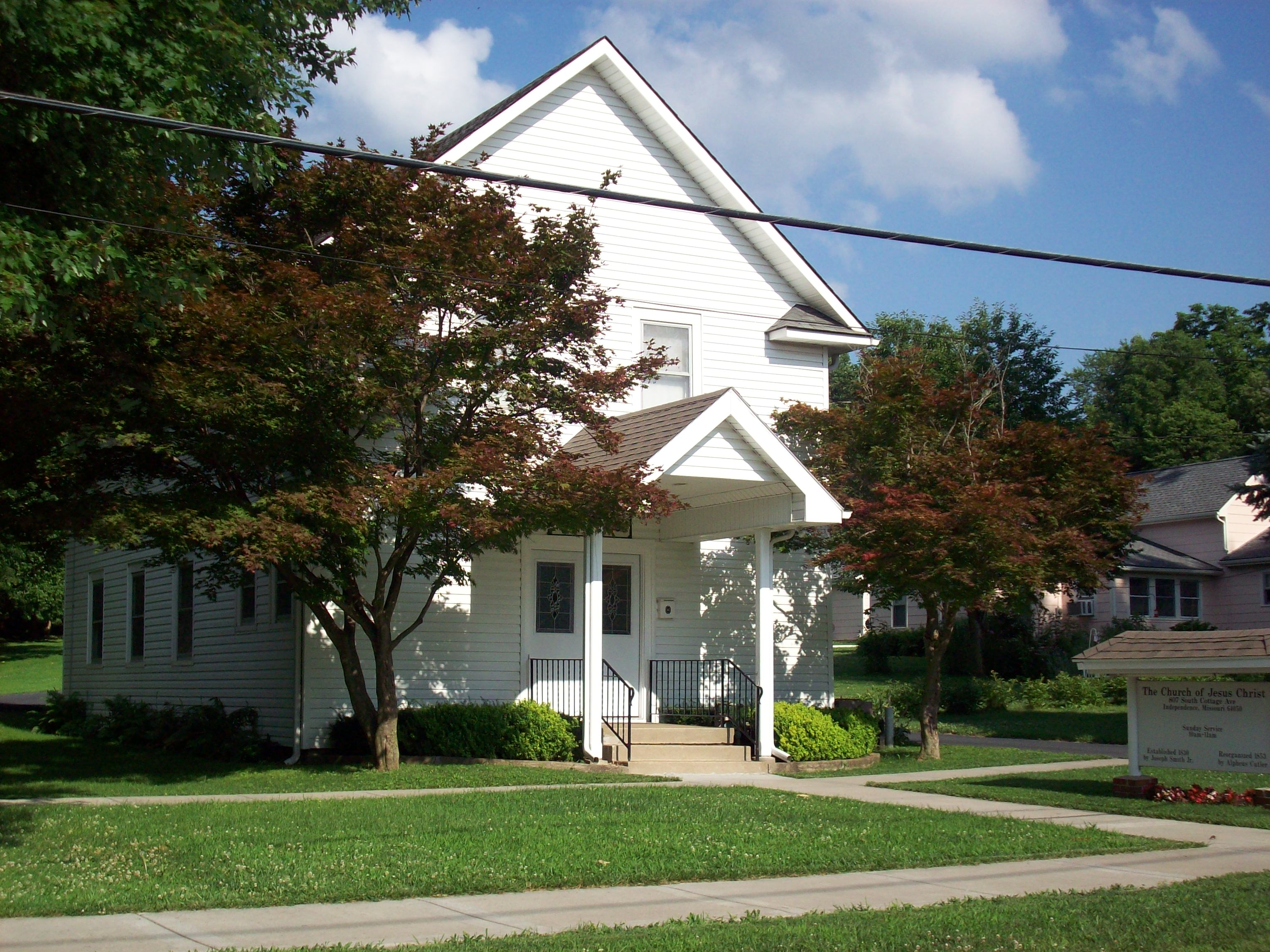
Cutlerite meetinghouse in Independence, Missouri, which serves the functions of a temple.

The Church of Jesus Christ (Cutlerite) performs temple ordinances in its Independence, Missouri, meetinghouse, their only building still in active use, though the church also believes in the principle of constructing special temples such as the ones in Kirtland and Nauvoo. Cutlerites do not designate their meetinghouse as a temple per se, but they believe that it serves precisely the same purpose and that the ordinances performed there are equally as valid as ones done in any pre-1844 temple. These sacred services of the Cutlerites are not open to the public, and participants are forbidden to discuss them outside the room in which they are performed.

Cutlerite meetinghouses are constructed with a main-floor chapel that is always open to the public unless baptisms for the dead are being performed; a second-floor room, which is closed to the public at all times, is reserved for the ordinances of the endowment. Cutlerites do not use the term "endowment" to refer to these rituals; they generally refer to them as "the priesthood ordinances". A rectangular-shaped baptismal font is accessed through a trap door beneath the floor of the main-floor chapel, which is used for baptisms of both the living and the dead. Eternal marriages are not performed by the Cutlerites, as they have always rejected that particular doctrine.

== Community of Christ ==
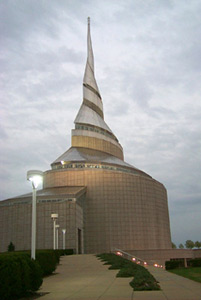
Independence Temple of Community of Christ in Independence, Missouri, USA. Dedicated 1994

Community of Christ (formerly the RLDS Church) currently maintains one temple. Unlike those of the LDS Church, the temple is open to the public. Many religious functions take place including communion and a daily prayer for peace.

During its 1994 World Conference, Community of Christ dedicated the Independence Temple located in Independence, Missouri. The Community of Christ describes this temple as a house of worship and education "dedicated to the pursuit of peace". The church holds a Daily Prayer for Peace at 1:00 p.m. Central Time in the temple's 1,600 seat sanctuary.

From around 1901 to 2024, the temple built in Kirtland, Ohio, was owned and maintained by Community of Christ. This was the first temple built by the Latter Day Saint movement and the only temple completed in the lifetime of Joseph Smith. The LDS Church and Community of Christ announced on March 5, 2024, that ownership of the site had transferred to the former as part of a $192.5 million acquisition of historic sites and objects.

== Other denominations with temples ==
Four additional Latter Day Saint denominations have built temples:

- The Church of Christ (Wightite) built a temple near Zodiac, Texas, about three miles from Fredericksburg, at a colony founded by Lyman Wight. The only remaining material infrastructure of the colony is the Mormon Mill cemetery near Hamilton Creek, about fifty miles east by north of Fredericksburg.
- The Righteous Branch of the Church of Jesus Christ of Latter-day Saints, a denomination founded in 1978, built a pyramid-shaped temple near Modena, Utah. This was the first time any of the polygamous Mormon fundamentalists sects built a temple of their own.
- The Apostolic United Brethren built a temple in Ozumba, Mexico, in the 1990s, and has had an endowment house in Utah since sometime in the 1980s.
- The Fundamentalist Church of Jesus Christ of Latter-Day Saints (FLDS) built a temple at their settlement near Eldorado, Texas, in 2004. The architectural footprint of the FLDS temple roughly matches that of the original Nauvoo Temple.
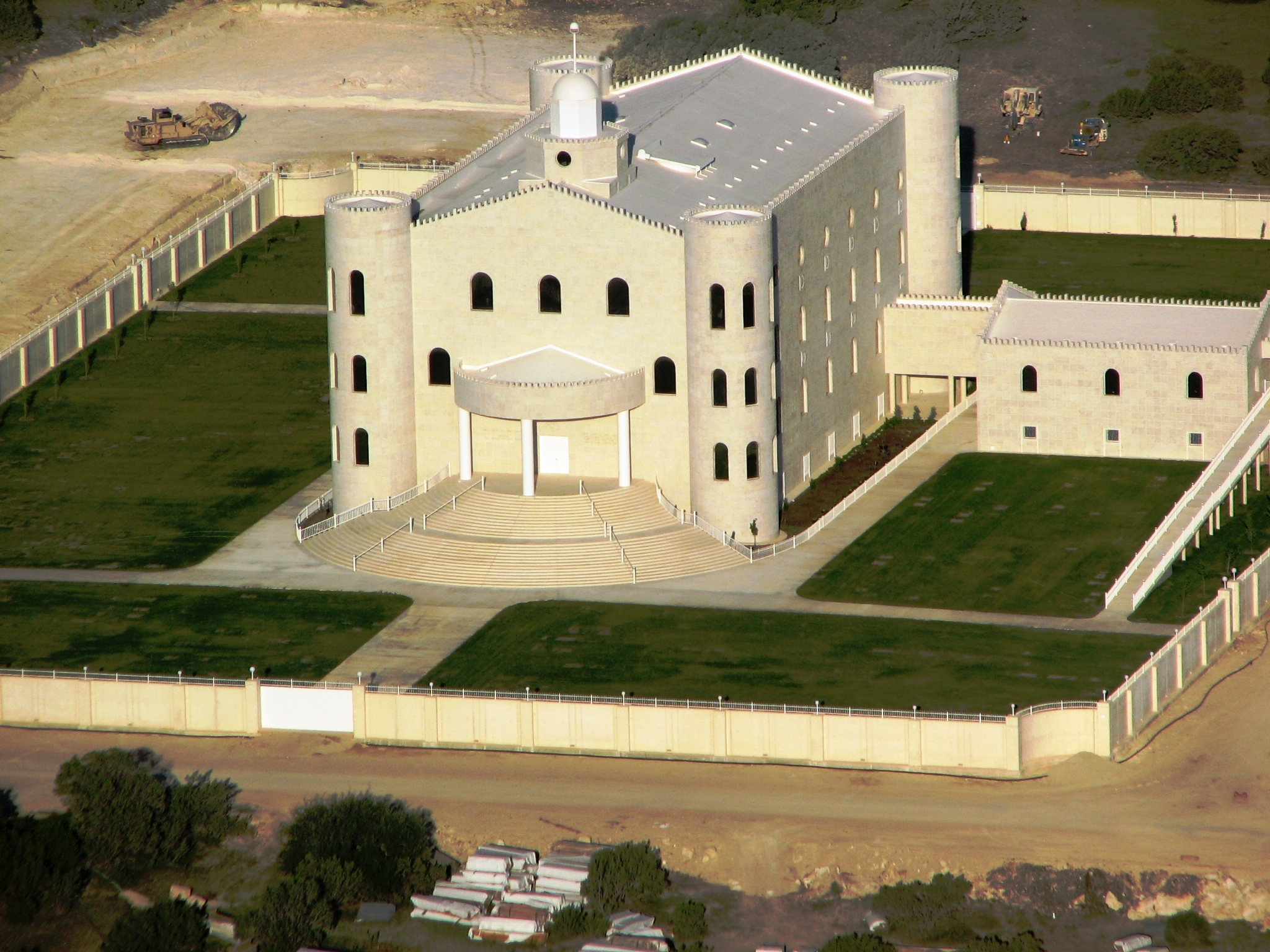
FLDS Temple

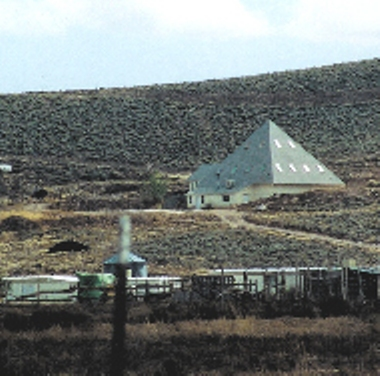
Righteous Branch temple

== Unsuccessful attempts at building temples ==
During the life of Joseph Smith, a few years before the Kirtland temple was built, Smith dedicated a location in Independence, Missouri, for the building of a special temple, which was to be the center of a New Jerusalem. However, hostile action by non-Mormon citizens resulted in the expulsion of all Latter Day Saints from the area in 1833, and the planned temple did not proceed beyond the laying of cornerstones. As of 2011, the lot for this temple is owned and maintained by the Church of Christ (Temple Lot). The Temple Lot church endeavored to construct a temple beginning in 1929, as a result of a revelation that apostle Otto Fetting was said to have received from John the Baptist. A hole for the proposed temple basement was excavated, and architects' drawings were done, but no further work was completed due to a chronic lack of funding and the expulsion of Fetting and his followers (about one-third of the Temple Lot organization at the time) from the Temple Lot church. In 1946, the City of Independence had the hole filled in, and the lot today is mostly covered with grass, with the Church of Christ's meetinghouse and a few trees at the northeast corner. Today, the Temple Lot church has no plans to build a temple but sees itself as the steward of the lot until the various Latter Day Saint factions unite around the time of Jesus Christ's Second Coming.

The Church of Jesus Christ of Latter Day Saints (Strangite) endeavored to construct a temple in the mid-1840s in Voree, Wisconsin, according to a rather elaborate plan devised by their prophet James J. Strang. Poverty and factional infighting among the Strangites prevented the temple from progressing beyond the planning stage. The church has made no attempt to build temples since Strang's death.

== Performing ordinances in other buildings ==
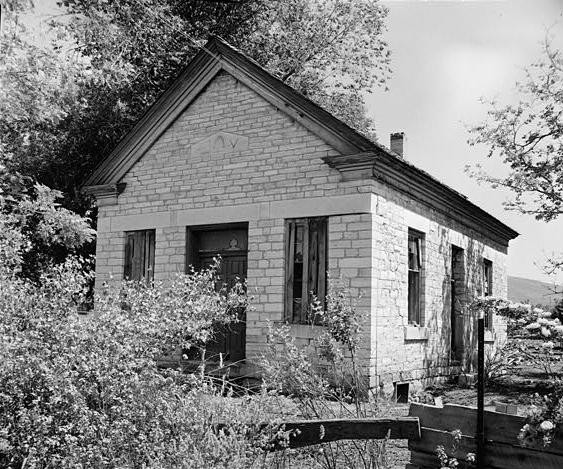
Building currently known as the Endowment House, Spring City, Utah.

From 1855 to 1889, the LDS Church performed ordinances in the Endowment House to allow members to receive the endowment during construction of temples in Utah. Before the Endowment House was built, the Council House was similarly used, between 1850 and 1855.

Historically, there were other locations where ordinances for the living were performed, both indoors and out, as recorded in pioneer journals. One of these is a building known as the Endowment House in Spring City, Utah, built by Orson Hyde. The building is still standing at 85 West 300 South.

The Endowment House in Salt Lake City was razed in 1889 after church president Wilford Woodruff learned that plural marriages were being performed there without the authorization of the First Presidency.

== See also ==
- Holy of Holies (LDS Church)
- Ordinance room
