= Supplication =

Form of prayer

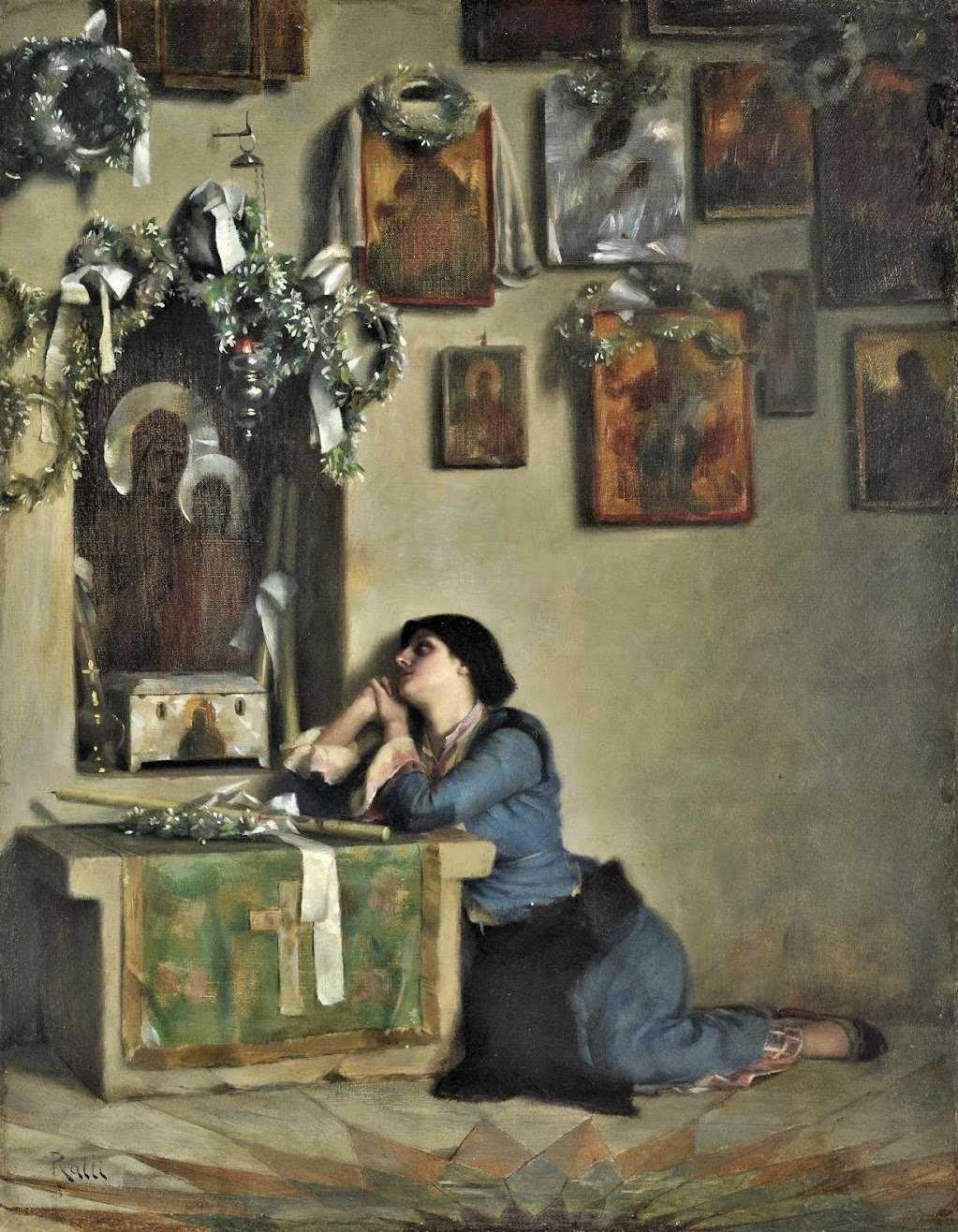
The Supplication by Théodore Ralli, 1905–1909

Supplication (also known as petitioning) is a form of prayer, wherein one party humbly or earnestly asks another party to provide something, either for the party who is doing the supplicating (e.g., "Please spare my life.") or on behalf of someone else.

== In Classical Greek religion ==
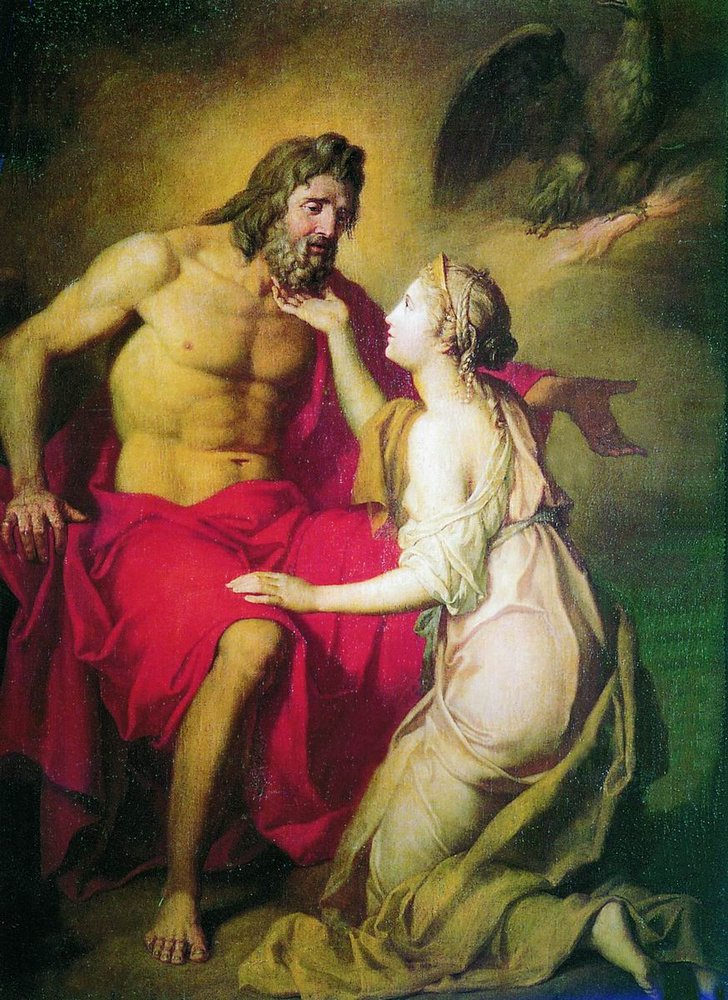
Painting by Anton Losenko of Thetis touching Zeus' chin in supplication

Supplication is a theme of earliest antiquity, embodied in the Iliad as the prayers of Chryses for the return of his daughter, and of Priam for the dead body of his son, Hector. Richard Martin notes repeated references to supplicants throughout the poem, including warriors begging to be spared by the Greeks on the battlefield. The formal gesture of supplication was clasping another's knees with one's left hand and touching their chin with the right.

== In ancient Rome ==
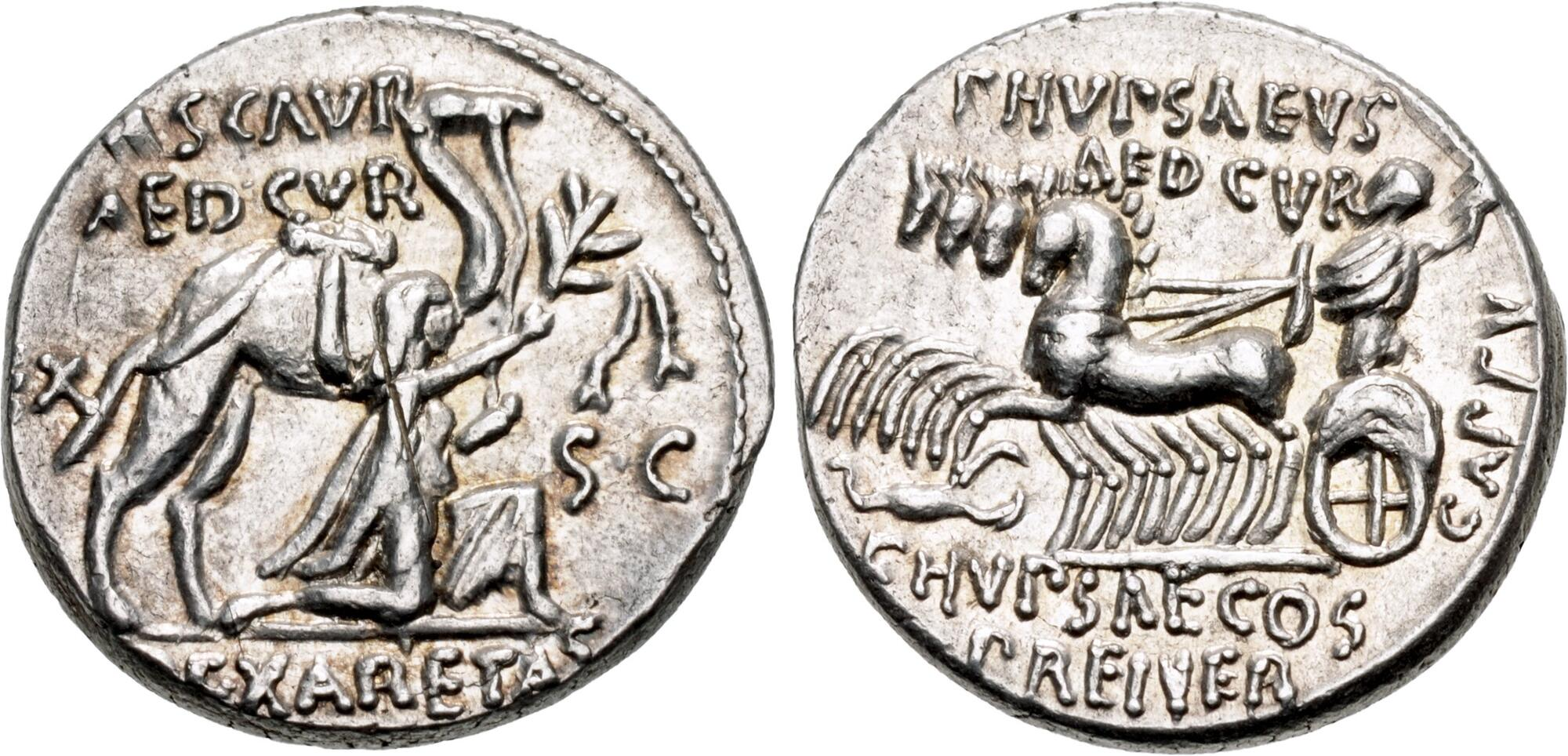
Denarius minted by M. Aemilius Scaurus in 58 BC, showing the supplication of a figure labeled Rex Aretas with Jupiter driving a quadriga on the reverse

In ancient Rome, formal supplication as a request, whether to a private individual or following surrender or military defeat, had four formal steps:

1. Approach: the suppliant approaches the supplicandus, the person from whom the request is sought. During the Republican era, this approach was not made at an altar and was not considered a prayer (prex) in the technical religious sense.

2. Identification: the suppliant performs conventional gestures or words in order to identify himself.

3. Request: the suppliant states what his request is and may present an argument for why he should receive it.

4. Rejection or acceptance: The supplicandus may reject the request. If he accepts it, he makes a pledge to fulfill it.

The pledge to fulfill the request is the part of the process considered sacred and witnessed by deities including Fides and Jupiter.

In Latin, the word submissio more commonly expresses this act than supplicatio, which was a form of public prayer procession. In the Imperial era, however, a petition to the emperor for judicial review was called a supplicatio, with the term later used for a request that the emperor review a legal judgment that otherwise would not have been subject to appeal.

== In Christianity ==
In Christianity, the prayer of supplication for health by and on behalf of the sick is referenced in early Christian writings in the New Testament, especially James 5:13-16.

One example of supplication is the Western Christian ritual of novena (from novem, the Latin word for 'nine') wherein one repeatedly asks for the same favor over a period of nine days. This ritual began in Spain during the Middle Ages when a nine-day period of hymns and prayers led up to a Christmas feast, a period which ended with gift giving. A contemporary Christian example of supplication is the practice of the Daily Prayer for Peace by the Community of Christ where a member prays for peace each day at a specified time. Philippians 4:6 says, "Be anxious for nothing, but in everything by prayer and supplication, with thanksgiving, let your requests be made known to God."

== In Hinduism ==
In Hinduism, प्रार्थना (prārthanā) is the Sanskrit term that denotes the practice of supplication to a deity. It one of the various preparatory rites performed before pūjā (ritualistic worship of a deity), performed for the purpose of the purification of the devotee.

== In Islam ==
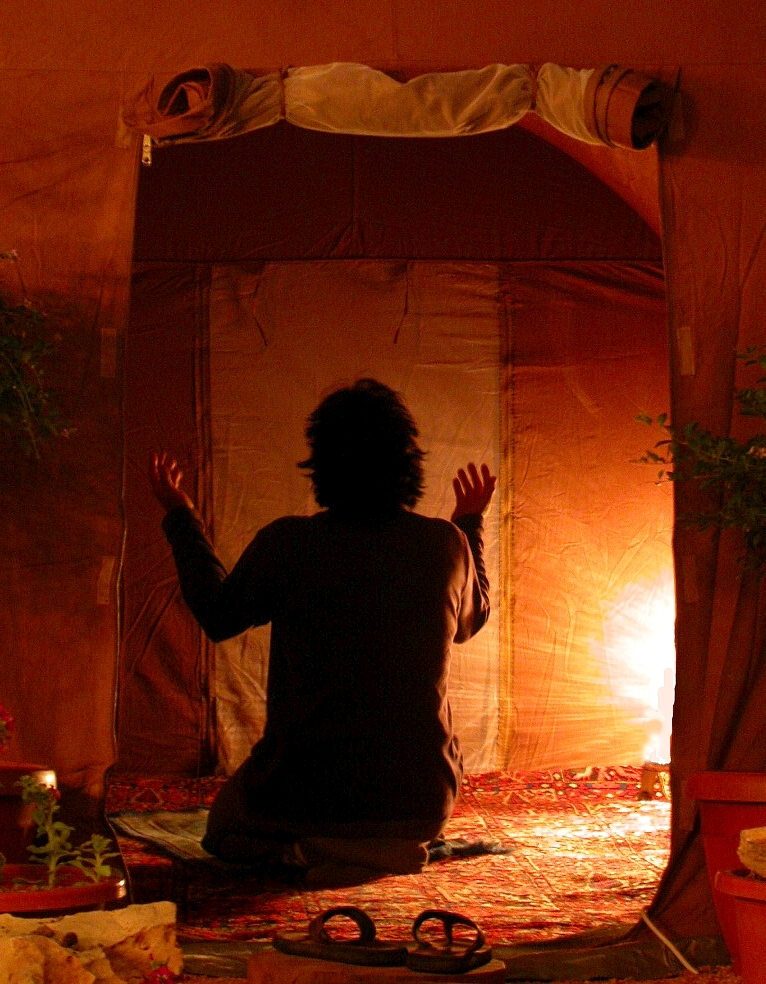
A Muslim raising hands in duʿāʾ

In Islam, the Arabic word duʿāʾ (Arabic: دعاء; pl. أدعية [ʾadʿiyah]) is used to refer to supplications. ʾAdʿiyah may be made in any language, although there are many traditional Islamic supplications in Arabic, Persian and Turkish. There are a number of supplications mentioned in Islam in the Quran and Sunnah that can be recited for various purposes for the blessings and the rewards of God. Supplications can range in nature for everyday tasks like sleeping, eating, drinking water and can be more specific in nature like supplications for knowledge or supplications for health and more.

The Quran is the primary source of supplications. Forty such supplications are mentioned in the Quran and are most commonly recited by Muslims. The supplications of Islamic prophets are given in the Quran.

== In Sikhism ==
The word ardâs (ਅਰਦਾਸ) is derived from the Persian word arazdashat, meaning a request, a supplication, a prayer, a petition or an address to a superior authority. It is a Sikh prayer that is done before performing or after undertaking any significant task; after reciting the daily banis (prayers); or after completion of a service like the Paath, kirtan (hymn-singing) program, or any other religious program. In Sikhism, these prayers are also said before and after eating. The prayer is a plea to God to support and help the devotee with whatever he or she is about to undertake or has done.
