= Daily Prayer for Peace =

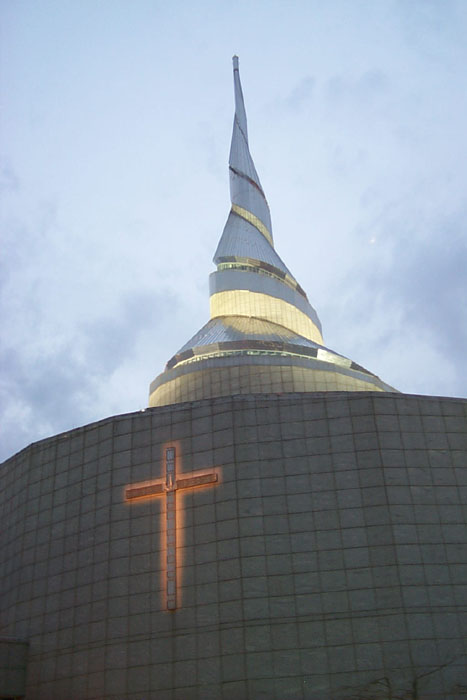
Community of Christ Temple in Independence, Missouri, USA. Dedicated 1994.

The Daily Prayer for Peace is a spiritual discipline unique to the Community of Christ and practiced at the Independence Temple in the church's headquarters in Independence, Missouri. It falls within the most common category of Christian prayer known as supplication.

Each day of the year at 1 p.m. Central Standard Time/Central Daylight Time, a Daily Prayer for Peace is held as part of a brief worship service dedicated to that purpose held in the sanctuary of the Independence Temple. The sanctuary is open to the public as members lead a brief worship service that includes the Daily Prayer for Peace. The form is a publicly spoken prayer, usually written by a member from somewhere in the world, and read aloud either by that same member or another. Each day, the Daily Prayer for Peace is focused on the needs of a different nation of the world. The supplicant prays aloud for peace under the 150-foot dome of the temple spire.

Those living in or visiting Independence, Missouri, are encouraged to stop in to participate in this worship experience, and those elsewhere around the globe are encouraged to pause for a moment of silent prayer.

== Background ==
At the 1984 World Conference of Community of Christ, Prophet-President Wallace B. Smith called for the construction of the Independence Temple and its dedication "to the pursuit of peace."

A committee formed to consider the worship ministries to be held in the new temple, devised the idea of a Daily Prayer for Peace to act as a witness of Christ's peace and a "symbol of the Church's unrelenting pursuit of peace."

The Daily Prayer for Peace has been held daily in the Independence Temple since December 1993. It is one of many practices, including the Community of Christ International Peace Award, that distinguish the denomination and its members.

Prior to 9 April 2007, the Daily Prayer for Peace was held at 12:30 p.m. Central Standard Time/Central Daylight Time. With the change in time, those working at Community of Christ International Headquarters are encouraged to pause and attend this service.

Since 26 October 2007, the Friday Prayer for Peace began to be held each Friday at noon Eastern Time at the Kirtland Temple, then daily beginning May 2008.

== Order of service ==
The committee developed a standard order of service which is normally followed: Gathering in Silence, Call to Prayer, Lighting of Candle, Invitation, Scripture Reading, Prayer for Peace, Prayers of the People, Hymn, Benediction, and Postlude.

== Prayer topics ==
In order to ensure a truly global reach for the prayers, a different country is named each day as a focus of prayer. The schedule can be seen on the Community of Christ website http://www.cofchrist.org/prayerpeace/. This schedule reflects the ecumenical prayer cycle of the World Council of Churches, which lists a nation or series of nations for each week of the year.
