= Independence Temple =

Church building in Missouri, United States

The Temple
- Viewed from the west in 2021

Religion
- Affiliation: Community of Christ

Location
- Location: Independence, Missouri
- Interactive map of The Temple
- Coordinates: 39°5′28.04″N 94°25′35.33″W

Architecture
- Architect: Gyo Obata
- Groundbreaking: April 6, 1990
- Completed: 1994

The Temple in Independence, Missouri, is a house of worship and education "dedicated to the pursuit of peace". It dominates the skyline of Independence and has become the focal point of the headquarters of the Community of Christ (formerly the Reorganized Church of Jesus Christ of Latter Day Saints). The temple was built by the Community of Christ in response to a revelation presented at their 1984 World Conference by church prophet-president Wallace B. Smith. The revelation was the culmination of instructions shared over the course of more than 150 years by prior prophet-presidents recognized by the Community of Christ. Groundbreaking for the temple took place on April 6, 1990, and the completed structure was dedicated on April 17, 1994.

== Structure and building ==
If ye are faithful, ye shall assemble yourselves together to rejoice upon the land of Missouri, which is the land of your inheritance, which is now the land of your enemies.

— Doctrine and Covenants (Community of Christ edition), section 52, verse 9e

The temple was designed by Gyo Obata and evokes the spiral shell of the nautilus with a stainless steel spire that rises 300 feet (91 m). The facility displays art which comprises a collection of modern and traditional religious art from around the world. The entry to the sanctuary is through an etched glass archway depicting the Sacred Grove where Joseph Smith had his initial revelatory experience. This leads to the gently ascending worshipper's path of textured stone which spirals around its periphery. Along the path are artworks and a fountain symbolising the "living water" of John 4:10 for meditative focus. The temple's main sanctuary has seating for approximately 1,600. It houses a Casavant pipe organ with 60 stops, 102 ranks, and 5685 pipes. At the exit foyer in the mouth of the spiral, "The Field is White, Already to Harvest" (see John: 4:35) is a large stained glass wall depicting rice and wheat, that earned an American Institute of Architects award for religious art. Adjacent are the massive bronze exit doors which carry the church seal depicting the peaceful lion, lamb, and child from Isaiah 11:6 and the word "PEACE". The wide steps open up onto a world plaza with global map of inlaid brick.

The public is welcomed to the temple, where there is a Daily Prayer for Peace at 1:00 p.m. Central Time on behalf of a selected nation of the world. A meditation chapel with paintings by Jack Garnier of the Sacraments being performed around the world opens onto a Japanese style meditation garden and serves the needs of individuals or small groups of visitors. The temple also contains the church archives, the Temple School, administrative offices of church headquarters, theaters used for visitors and also for meetings, presentations, and classes, a museum and gift shop. The building has become a popular attraction with guided tours available. Approximately 60,000 people visit the temple each year.

== Temple ministries ==
The temple is regarded as a symbol of the church's mission and has long been closely associated with the denomination's developing theology of Zion, or the peaceable Kingdom of God, first advocated as basileia tou theou by Jesus Christ. The first major event held at the temple prior to its dedication was the International Women's Conference in June 1993. The temple has no private ceremonies and is open to everyone. The sacraments performed there are communion, administration to the sick (laying on of hands), and priesthood ordination. Initially, six temple ministries centers were created in response to the building of the temple. The temple according to Ken Robinson, former member of the First Presidency, "gives form to our commitment to Jesus Christ" and that it "is at the center of meaning and identity for members of...Community of Christ"

== Temple lot ==
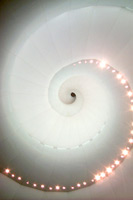
A view looking up the spire from the center of the temple

Wallace B. Smith's great-grandfather and founder of the Latter-day Saint movement, Joseph Smith, visited Jackson County in 1831 and prophesied that a temple to the Lord would be built there. The early Latter-day Saints purchased a 73 acres (30 ha) parcel of land known as the "greater temple lot". At that time a portion of the property was dedicated as the site for a temple, and cornerstones were laid. However, the church members were driven from the county before any construction began. The original temple site proper is now owned by the Church of Christ (Temple Lot).

The Community of Christ's temple is built on the greater temple lot, as is the Auditorium, the headquarters chapel of the Church of Christ (Temple Lot) and a visitor center of the Church of Jesus Christ of Latter-day Saints.

== See also ==
- Minar (Firuzabad)
