= Auditorium (Community of Christ) =

Church (and office building) in Independence, Missouri, U.S.

Community of Christ Auditorium
- The Auditorium
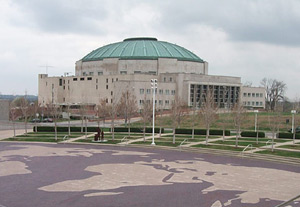
- Interactive map of Community of Christ Auditorium
- Former names: RLDS Auditorium
- Address: U.S.
- Location: 1001 West Walnut, Independence, Missouri
- Coordinates: 39.0898°N 94.4283°W
- Owner: Community of Christ
- Capacity: ~6,000
- Field size: 214 feet (65 m)x 168 feet (51 m); 92 feet (28 m) floor to roof (conference center); 114 feet (35 m) to top of dome

Construction
- Groundbreaking: 1926 (100 years ago)
- Opened: 1958 (68 years ago)

Tenant
- Community of Christ

The Auditorium (formerly the RLDS Auditorium) is a house of worship and office building, located on the greater Temple Lot in Independence, Missouri, United States. The Auditorium is part of the headquarters campus of Community of Christ, which also includes the Independence Temple.

== Construction ==
Construction of the Auditorium was a major undertaking, illustrating the vision of church prophet and president Frederick M. Smith, who provided the building's inspiration. Ground was broken in 1926 and the building was finally completed in 1958. Smith's plans for the Conference chamber were originally about sixty-six percent larger than when it was finished. Construction was virtually halted during the Great Depression when the church struggled under a massive debt.

== Auditorium pipe organ ==
The Auditorium houses an Aeolian-Skinner pipe organ with 113 ranks and 6,334 pipes. The Auditorium Organ includes an antiphonal console and pipes in the rear balcony of the oval chamber. It is listed as one of the 75 largest pipe organs in the world. Organist John Obetz (1933–2015) originated his Auditorium Organ weekly radio program from the Auditorium between 1968 and 1993, playing the Aeolian-Skinner organ for a national audience.

== Events ==
=== World conferences ===
World Conferences of the church are held every three years in the World Conference chamber, which seats 5,800 people. The Conference chamber is 214 by 168 feet (65 m × 51 m) and it is 92 feet (28 m) from the floor to ceiling of the dome's interior. The exterior of the dome rises 114 feet (35 m) above street level. The original plan for the Auditorium included two balconies, but due to limited finances, only one was built.

=== Performances ===
The Auditorium hosts an annual performance and broadcast of Handel's Messiah oratorio by the Independence Messiah Choir, accompanied by the Kansas City Symphony.

The Community of Christ International Peace Award has been awarded in ceremonies at the Auditorium.

=== Other events ===
In addition to religious use, the Auditorium is available for high school and college graduations and cultural events in the Independence and Kansas City area.

Numerous dignitaries have spoken in the Auditorium. On June 27, 1945, Independence native U.S. president Harry S. Truman gave a speech at the Auditorium on his first return trip to Independence during his presidency. During his remarks, which were also attended by First Lady Bess Truman and their daughter, Margaret Truman, President Truman announced that the United States had become a signatory to the United Nations treaty. Former U.S. secretary of state Colin Powell delivered an address at the Auditorium on July 24, 1998, commemorating the fiftieth anniversary of the executive order that led to the desegregation of the United States military. Primate researcher and environmentalist Jane Goodall spoke at the Auditorium in 1999. On July 5, 2007, former U.S. president Bill Clinton gave the keynote address at the Auditorium commemorating the fiftieth anniversary of the Truman Presidential Library, also located in Independence.
