= Succession crisis (Latter Day Saints) =

1844 religious-political event

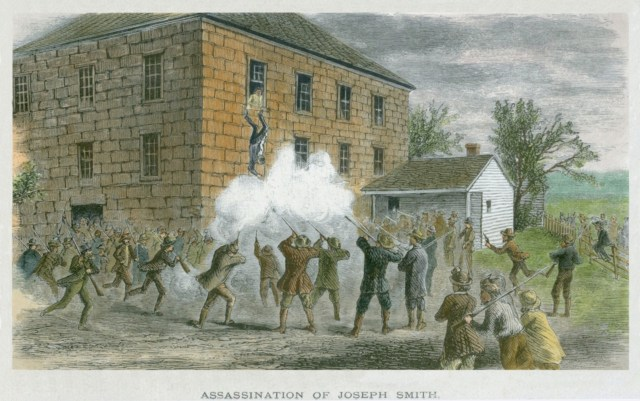
An illustration depicting the assassinations of Joseph and Hyrum Smith in Carthage, Illinois on June 27, 1844

The succession crisis in the Latter Day Saint movement occurred after the killing of the movement's founder, Joseph Smith, on June 27, 1844.

For roughly six months after Smith's death, several people competed to take over his role, the leading contenders being Sidney Rigdon, Brigham Young, and James Strang. The majority of the Latter Day Saint movement elected to follow Young's leadership, which eventually resulted in the establishment of the Church of Jesus Christ of Latter-day Saints (LDS Church), but several smaller Latter Day Saint churches emerged from the succession crisis. This significant event in early Latter Day Saint history precipitated several permanent schisms.

== Background ==
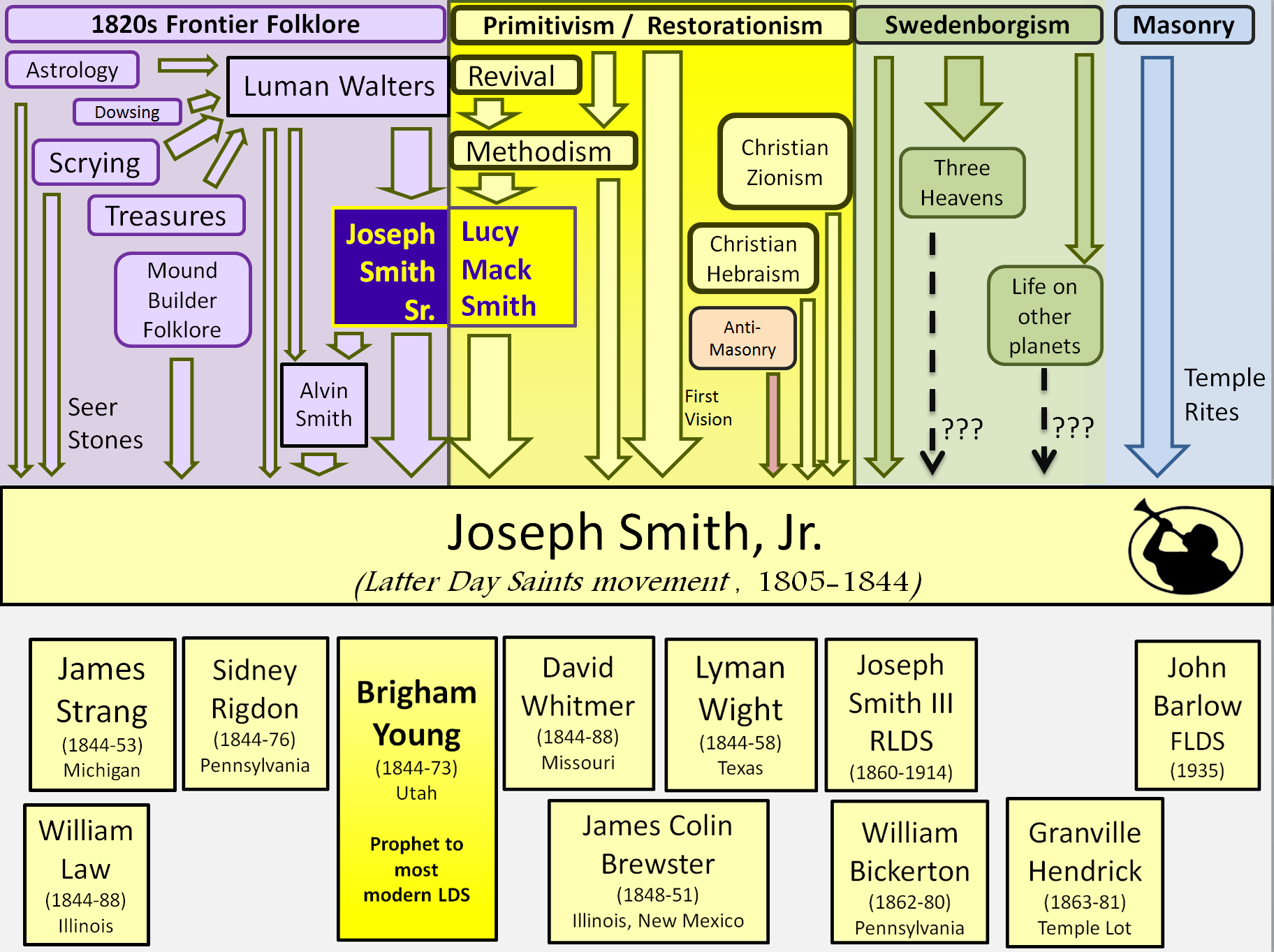
Upon Smith's death, claimed successors included Sidney Rigdon, David Whitmer, William Law, James Strang, Lyman Wight, and Brigham Young. Latter leaders include James Collins Brewster, Joseph Smith III, William Bickerton and Granville Hendrick. In the 20th century, John Y. Barlow created the Fundamentalist LDS church.

The Church of Christ was organized by a small group of men led by Joseph Smith on April 6, 1830. Between that time and Smith's death in 1844, the administrative and ecclesiastical organization of the new church evolved from an egalitarian group of believers into an institution based on hierarchy of priesthood offices. This gradual change was driven by both the growth in church membership and the evolution of Smith's role as leader of the church.

Prior to the formal establishment of the Church of Christ, Smith held the title of "Prophet, Seer, and Revelator", a title unanimously supported by the other founding members of the church. However, as the church was "organized" rather than legally "incorporated", its property needed to be held in trust by a trustee; Smith became the church's Trustee-in-Trust.

Initially, the highest leadership position in the Church of Christ was that of "elder", and church elders were sometimes called "apostles". Smith's initial title in the church was "First Elder", while his friend and associate, Oliver Cowdery, was given the title "Second Elder". In March 1832, Smith created a quorum of three presidents known as the First Presidency. He became president of the First Presidency, a title which became associated with the office of "President of the Church", with Sidney Rigdon and Jesse Gause serving as his counselors in the First Presidency.

On December 18, 1833, Smith created the office of "Patriarch over the Church" and ordained his father, Joseph Smith Sr., to fill the role. The "Presiding Patriarch", as the office came to be called, often presided over church meetings and was sometimes sustained at church conferences ahead of all other church officers. Two months later, in Kirtland, Ohio, Smith created a High Council, a body consisting of twelve men, headed by the First Presidency. The High Council took on the role of chief judicial and legislative body of the church, handling such matters as excommunication trials and approval of all church spending.

Several months later, on July 3, 1834, the High Council of Zion was organized in Far West, Missouri. This council is also known as the Presiding High Council, for it was designated to preside over the council established in Kirtland, as well as all future High Councils at the various Stakes of Zion. Cases tried in the standing High Councils of outlying stakes were regularly appealed to the High Council of Zion, it being the penultimate court standing only second to the First Presidency. The Presiding High Council also provided clearance for ordinations in the standing High Councils at the Stakes of Zion.

On February 14, 1835, nearly one year after the High Council in Kirtland was organized, the Quorum of the Twelve Apostles, "or special witnesses of the name of Christ in all the world", was formed as a "Traveling Presiding High Council." This council consisted of twelve men, called and ordained by the Three Witnesses of the Book of Mormon to the office of apostle, and appointed to oversee the missionary work of the church—meaning that their presiding role was outside of the Stakes of Zion. Thomas B. Marsh was set apart as their president. In practice, while both this group and the High Council in Zion were Presiding High Councils, their jurisdictions were divided with one as “standing” ministers over the Stakes of Zion, and the other “traveling” outside of the Stakes. Initially, the Quorum was subordinate to the High Council of Zion; for example, in 1838, when vacancies arose in the quorum, it was the Standing Presiding High Council at Far West that filled the vacancies.

When the High Council in Zion was dissolved after the church was expelled from Missouri, the headquarters of the church were moved to Nauvoo, Illinois, There, Smith formed a new Presiding High Council, led by William Marks, which supervised the High Councils of outlying stakes, under the direction of the First Presidency.

Latter Day Saint scripture finalized in 1835 indicated that the First Presidency, Quorum of the Twelve, and Standing Presiding High Council were equal in authority, though remaining subordinate "under the direction of the Presidency of the Church." This coequality would become a driving force for the succession of Marks to the presidency, as espoused by Smith's widow, Emma Hale Smith, as well as in modern times by historian D. Michael Quinn.

== The 1844 succession ==
At the time of his death, Smith thus held several roles: "Prophet, Seer, Revelator, and Translator", "President of the Church", "President of the First Presidency", and "Trustee-in-Trust" of the church. It was unclear if all of these offices should be held together by any one successor and it was less than explicit who such a successor should be. However, a revelation of Smith in the Doctrine and Covenants, written in 1831 and published in 1835, designates that "three Presiding High Priests ... form a quorum of the Presidency of the Church" and "the Twelve Apostles...form a quorum, equal in authority and power to the three presidents previously mentioned."

=== Theoretical successors ===
Following Smith's murder, it was not immediately clear to the Latter Day Saints who would lead the church going forward.

==== Hyrum Smith ====
Contemporary statements by church leaders indicate that had the prophet's brother, Hyrum Smith, survived, he would have been the successor. Hyrum had been ordained Assistant President and Presiding Patriarch of the church, and the successor of Oliver Cowdery, who had been excommunicated. Hyrum, however, was killed in Carthage, Illinois, alongside Joseph. Regarding Hyrum, Brigham Young stated:

"Did Joseph Smith ordain any man to take his place. He did. Who was it? It was Hyrum, but Hyrum fell a martyr before Joseph did. If Hyrum had lived he would have acted for Joseph".

==== Samuel Smith ====
Following the principle of lineal succession, Smith's younger brother, Samuel Harrison Smith, was the next potential candidate in line. Sometime between June 23 and June 27, 1844, Smith reportedly stated that "if he and Hyrum were taken away, Samuel H. Smith would be his successor". However, Samuel died suddenly on July 30, 1844, just a month after Joseph and Hyrum were murdered.

==== William Smith ====
The last of Joseph Smith's surviving brothers, William Smith, initially claimed the right to succeed his brothers only as Presiding Patriarch. Much later, after breaking with several Latter Day Saint factions, he exercised his own claim to the presidency of the church, with little result. William alleged that Samuel was poisoned at the behest of Young. Young, however, denied any involvement, noting that he did not even know of Joseph's death for three or four weeks afterwards, some time after Samuel's. No physical evidence exists that suggests that Samuel was the victim of foul play.

==== Children of Joseph Smith ====
Smith also seemed to have given indications that one of his sons would succeed him. Several church leaders later stated that on August 27, 1834, and April 22, 1839, Smith indicated his eldest son, Joseph Smith III, would be his successor. At the time of his father's death, Joseph Smith III was eleven years old. Similarly, in April 1844, the elder Smith had reportedly prophesied his unborn child would be a son who was to be named "David" and would "make his mark in the world". There are reports a patriarchal blessing given to Joseph Smith III, naming the young Joseph as Smith's successor.

==== Oliver Cowdery ====
Cowdery had been the "Second Elder" of the church after Smith, and until the time of his excommunication held the keys of the dispensation with Joseph. In addition, he was with Smith at all the important events of the early church. Like Hyrum later, Joseph had ordained Cowdery as the Assistant President of the Church and had given him authority "to assist in presiding over the whole Church and to officiate in the absence of the President". However, Cowdery was excommunicated on April 12, 1838.

==== David Whitmer ====
David Whitmer had been ordained President of the High Council of Zion, and Joseph had blessed him on July 7, 1834, "to be a leader or a prophet to this Church, which (ordination) was on condition that he (J. Smith) did not live to God himself". Upon forming the High Council, Smith stated "if he should be taken away that he had accomplished the great work which the Lord had laid before him, and that which he had desired of the Lord, and that he now had done his duty in organizing the High Council, through which Council the will of the Lord might be known". Whitmer, however, separated from the church in June 1838.

Successor	Prior position in church	Years^{†}	Major Latter Day Saint movement denominations	Current membership
Sidney Rigdon	Senior surviving member of the First Presidency	1844–1847	Church of Jesus Christ (Bickertonite)	15,000
Brigham Young	President of the Quorum of the Twelve Apostles	1844–1877	The Church of Jesus Christ of Latter-day Saints.	16,805,400
James Strang	Elder; Letter of Appointment	1844–1856	Church of Jesus Christ of Latter Day Saints (Strangite)	<1,000
Granville Hedrick	No ordination record available; likely Elder	1850s–1881	Church of Christ (Temple Lot)	12,000
Granville Hedrick	No ordination record available; likely Elder	1850s–1881	Church of Christ with the Elijah Message	10,000
Alpheus Cutler	Member of the Presiding High Council and Council of Fifty	1853-1864	Church of Jesus Christ (Cutlerite)	<100
Joseph Smith III (1860)	Direct descendant and blessing Lineal Successor^{‡}	1860–1914	Community of Christ, formerly the Reorganized Church of Jesus Christ of Latter Day Saints (RLDS)	250,000

^{†} Years during which claimed successor led named denomination
^{‡} Became Lineal successor after death of William Smith in 1894

=== Immediate successors ===
Smith's death left a number of important church leaders, councils, and quorums – many of which had overlapping and/or evolving functions – without guidance. The claims of each of these quorums came into play at some point after Smith's death.

The highest executive council in the church was the First Presidency, of which Rigdon as the last surviving members after the deaths of the Smith brothers. As early as April 19, 1834, Joseph Smith and Cowdery had "laid hands upon bro. Sidney [Rigdon] and confirmed upon him the blessings of wisdom and knowledge to preside over the Church in the absence of brother Joseph". In the spring of 1844, Smith had begun running a third-party candidacy to be elected president of the United States. Rigdon was nominated as Smith's vice presidential running mate and had moved to Pennsylvania to establish legal residency there (the United States Constitution dictates that electors must vote for candidates for president and vice president from separate states). Upon receiving word of Smith's death, Rigdon claimed to receive a revelation calling him to succeed Smith as "guardian" of the church, and he hurriedly returned to Nauvoo to exercise his claim.

After the First Presidency, the (Presiding) Nauvoo High Council was the church's chief non-travelling legislative and judicial council. Originally, the Council outranked the Quorum of the Twelve Apostles, at least at the organized stakes. Marks, president of the Nauvoo Stake, was also president of the High Council at the time of Smith's death. Emma Hale Smith urged Marks to succeed her late husband as President and Trustee-in-Trust of the church, and articulated her argument thusly: "Now as the Twelve have no power with regard to the government of the Church in the Stakes of Zion, but the High Council have all power, so it follows that on removal of the first President, the office would devolve upon the President of the High Council in Zion, as the first President always resides there, and that is the proper place for the quorum of which he is the head; thus there would be no schism or jarring. But the Twelve would attend to their duties in the world and not meddle with the government of the church at home[,] and the High Council in Zion and the first Presidency would attend to their business in the same place." However, Marks supported the claims of Rigdon.

The Quorum of the Twelve were originally ordained to be traveling ministers and had been delegated leadership of outlying areas of the world in which no "stakes" – local congregations – were established. By revelation, the Twelve, as a body, had authority equal to the First Presidency, the Presiding High Council, and the Quorum of Seventy. However, as stated by Smith at a May 2, 1835 conference, "the twelve apostles have no right to go into Zion or any of its stakes where there is a regular high council established, to regulate any matter pertaining thereto." In later years, however, Smith had given the Twelve a greater role in governing the church, charging them with running the organization's "temporal business" and elevating their role and status far beyond the what was established in the Doctrine and Covenants. In particular, at an August 16, 1841 conference, he stated that "the time had come when the twelve should be called upon to stand in their place next to the first presidency, and attend to the settling of emegrants [sic] and the business of the church at the stakes, and assist to bear off the kingdom victorious to the nations.” Furthermore, Smith stated that "the twelve should be authorized to assist in managing the affairs of th[e] kingdom in this place [Nauvoo]", followed by the church membership sustaining the Twelve "in regulating and superintending the affairs <of the Church.>" In other words, for the first time, the Twelve now took a leadership role within the organized stakes, "superintending the affairs of the church" as a whole, and standing "next to the first presidency." Beyond this, Smith admitted many of the Twelve to the Council of Fifty, his closest body of political advisers, and the Anointed Quorum, his closest body of theological advisers. Young, in particular, became one of Smith's closest confidants, and occasionally took charge during the 1840s in Smith's absence.

Another possibility for succession was the Council of Fifty, a group of trusted men, some of them non-Mormon, who campaigned for Smith's 1844 run for president, and sought the establishment of a theocratic government. Rigdon had moved to Pennsylvania in order to legally run as vice president. In a meeting of the Council of Fifty in the spring of 1844, Smith told those with him, “I roll the burthen [burden] and responsibility of leading this Church off from my shoulders on to yours ... Now, round up your shoulders and stand under it like men; for the Lord is going to let me rest a while”. Benjamin F. Johnson, a member of the Fifty but not the Twelve, recalled that Smith rose and spoke "in the presence of the Quorum of the Twelve and others who were encircled about him." According to Wilford Woodruff, Joseph "said that the Lord had now accepted his labors and sacrifices, and did not require him any longer to carry the responsibilities and burden and bearing off of this kingdom, and turning to those around him, including the 12, he said, 'And in the name of the Lord Jesus Christ I now place it upon you my brethren of the council (of 50) and I shake my skirts clear from all responsibility from this time forth.'"

== Campaigning after the death of Joseph Smith ==
At the time of Smith's death, Rigdon, Young, and many other church leaders were out of the state on evangelical missions for the church. Rigdon returned to Nauvoo first (August 3) and the next day announced at a public meeting that he had received a revelation appointing him "Guardian of the Church." William Marks called for a conference on August 8 to decide the issue.

On August 6, Young and the rest of the Twelve returned to Nauvoo; the next day, they met with Rigdon, who repeated his claim to become the guardian of the Church. Young responded by claiming Smith had conferred the right of succession (priesthood keys) upon himself and the Quorum of the Twelve Apostles. So while historically the First Presidency had previously led the Church, Young proposed an ad hoc Presidency of the Church in the Quorum of Twelve. Young tried diligently to persuade the people that he alone held the rights to lead the church. He even went so far as to ride through the streets on Smith's favorite horse, which was named Joe Duncan.

=== Conference of August 8, 1844 ===
At the conference on August 8, Rigdon spoke first to the assembled, asking the saints to confirm his role as "guardian." To back his claim, he cited his long relationship with Smith and the fact that he was the only surviving member of the First Presidency, arguing that Smith had sent him to Pennsylvania to prevent the entire presidency from being killed in the ongoing conflict. The move to Pennsylvania also occurred so Rigdon could be Smith's running mate for president, as the vice president cannot run from the same state.

After Rigdon spoke for ninety minutes, Young called for a recess of two and a half hours. When the conference resumed, Young spoke, emphasizing the idea that no man could ever replace Smith. However, he stated that the Quorum of the Twelve Apostles had all the "keys of the priesthood" that Smith had held. He answered Rigdon’s proposal to be named "guardian" by claiming that Rigdon and Smith had become estranged in recent years. Rather than a single guardian, Young proposed that the Quorum of the Twelve be named the church's leadership. Rigdon declined an offer to rebut Young, asking W. W. Phelps to speak for him. Instead, Phelps spoke in favor of Young's proposal. The assembled church members then voted by common consent on whether or not to accept the Twelve as the new leaders over the church. The majority voted in favor of the Twelve. Those who opposed the vote were all later excommunicated from the Nauvoo church.

Many of Young's followers would later reminisce that while Young spoke he looked and sounded similar to Smith, which they attributed to the power of God. Jorgensen establishes 101 written testimonies of people who say a transformation or spiritual manifestation occurred, some of whom were not in Nauvoo at the time. The exact details vary from one account to the next. There is disagreement as to whether his clothes changed, his face changed, his voice changed, or whether he just seemed like Smith in mannerism. There is disagreement between the accounts as to whether Young started talking with Smith's voice or whether his voice changed during the speech. There is disagreement as to whether everyone saw the transformation, or whether only a few people saw it. There is also disagreement as to whether this change happened directly after Rigdon's morning speech, or whether it happened in the afternoon after the recess.

The earliest reference, provided by Quinn, is the 15 November 1844 Henry and Catharine Brooke statement referring generally to Young bearing the greatest resemblance to Smith. However, Jorgensen concedes, “why were none of the accounts that record the miracle written on the day of the manifestation or shortly thereafter? It is a question that unfortunately cannot be answered definitively." Van Wagoner argues there are no known contemporary records of "an explicit transfiguration, a physical metamorphosis of Brigham Young into the form and voice of Joseph Smith" and that "[w]hen 8 August 1844 is stripped of emotional overlay, there is not a shred of irrefutable contemporary evidence to support the occurrence of a mystical event either in the morning or afternoon gatherings of that day." Esplin, on the other hand, argues that "[t]hough there is no contemporary diary account, the number of later retellings, many in remarkable detail argues for the reality of some such experience." Sidney Rigdon denied such a metamorphosis took place, and accused Young of lying about it.

=== Latter Day Saint organization after the conference ===
With the support of the majority of adherents, Young assumed leadership of the church. He met with the Twelve and members of the Anointed Quorum on August 9; Bishops Newel K. Whitney and George Miller "were appointed to settle the affairs of the late Trustee-in-Trust, Joseph Smith, and be prepared to enter upon the duties as Trustees of the Church of Jesus Christ of Latter-day Saints."

Meanwhile, Rigdon did not abandon his claims and began organizing supporters in Nauvoo. The Twelve Apostles discovered that Rigdon was undermining their authority; on September 3, 1844, Rigdon claimed "he had power and authority above the Twelve Apostles and did not consider himself amenable to their counsel". The Twelve then disfellowshipped Rigdon, on grounds of "Making a Division in the Church [by] ordaining Prophet, Priests & Kings contrary to the Say [way?] of God". He was excommunicated in absentia by the Common Council of the Church on September 8. Rigdon, claiming that Young's supporters had threatened his life, fled from Nauvoo and established a separate sect of the church in Pittsburgh, Pennsylvania, which excommunicated Young and most of the Twelve.

At the General Conference of October 6–7, 1844, the Quorum of the Twelve presided as the church's highest authority for the first time; Young was sustained as "the president of the quorum of the Twelve, as one of the Twelve and first presidency of the church." The saints did not sustain Marks as president of the Nauvoo Stake, sustaining John Smith in his place.

At this conference, Young also addressed the issue of revelation. More specifically, did revelations cease with Smith's death, or, if not, who would receive and publish them? He indicated his own uncertainty concerning the subject, concluding, "Every member has the right of receiving revelations for themselves, both male and female." Then he elaborated: "If you don't know whose right it is to give revelations, I will tell you. It is I".

=== Claims of James J. Strang ===
While these events were going on in Nauvoo, another successor of Smith began to exercise his claim in the church's outlying branches in Illinois, Michigan, Indiana and Wisconsin. Although he was a recent convert (baptized in February 1844), James J. Strang posed a strong, determined, and initially quite successful challenge to the claims of Young and Rigdon. Strang was an elder in the church, charged with establishing a stake in Wisconsin should the Latter Day Saints be forced to abandon their headquarters in Nauvoo. He possessed a letter, known as the Letter of Appointment, purportedly written by Smith the month of his death and appointing Strang to be Smith's successor as church president. Strang also claimed that at the moment of Smith's death, he was visited by angels who ordained him as Smith's successor.

Strang's claim appealed to many Latter Day Saints who had been attracted to the early church's doctrines of continuing revelation through the mouth of a living prophet. In the August 8, 1844, conference, Young had emphasized that no single man could replace Smith as prophet. Young subsequently used the Times and Seasons newspaper to announce to the church, "You no longer have a prophet, but you have apostles." Strang, by contrast, announced that there was, indeed, a new Mormon prophet to succeed Smith. Strang claimed to commune with angels and that he found and translated supposedly ancient records engraved upon metal plates, just as Smith had.

Some prominent Latter Day Saints believed in the Letter of Appointment and accepted Strang as the church's second "Prophet, Seer, Revelator, and Translator." One such follower was William Smith, Joseph's last surviving brother; he had asked to be ordained Presiding Patriarch in May 1845 and subsequently claimed that his ordination meant he should be the President of the Church, because of Hyrum Smith's position as both Presiding Patriarch and Associate President. Others included Book of Mormon witness Martin Harris, former Nauvoo Stake President William Marks, Second Bishop of the Church and church trustee-in-trust George Miller, Apostle John E. Page, former Apostle William E. M'Lellin, and John C. Bennett (excommunicated by Joseph Smith).

Strang's newspaper printed a statement allegedly signed by William Smith; Joseph Smith's mother, Lucy Mack Smith; and three of Joseph's sisters, certifying that "the Smith family do believe in the appointment of J. J. Strang." However, Smith's mother addressed the saints at the October 1844 General Conference and stated that she hoped all her children would accompany the saints to the West, and if they did she would go. Young then said: "We have extended the helping hand to Mother Smith. She has the best carriage in the city, and, while she lives, shall ride in it when and where she pleases". Whether she shifted her support from Young to Strang in the year following that October Conference is a matter of debate; what is certain is that she never made it to Utah, staying instead with her daughter-in-law, Emma, in Nauvoo until her death in the summer of 1856.

Strang established his separate church organization in Voree, Wisconsin, and called upon the Latter Day Saints to gather there. He and his hierarchy were excommunicated by the Quorum of the Twelve Apostles in Nauvoo and vice versa. By 1850, Strang and most of his followers had relocated to Beaver Island, Michigan, where Strang was shot by dissenters on June 16, 1856, and died shortly thereafter. Most of his followers then joined with Joseph Smith III and the Reorganized Church of Jesus Christ of Latter Day Saints (RLDS Church; now called the Community of Christ).

=== Sidney Rigdon and The Church of Jesus Christ ===
Prior to the death of Joseph Smith, the First Presidency had made nearly all the major decisions and led the church both naturally and spiritually. On June 1, 1841, Sidney Rigdon had been ordained by Joseph Smith as a "Prophet, Seer and Revelator"—which was one of the same ecclesiastical titles held by Smith. The Church of Jesus Christ maintains that as First Counselor to Smith, Rigdon should naturally have been the leader of the church after Smith's death. With this understanding, The Church of Jesus Christ actively opposes the opinion that the Quorum of Twelve had the right to lead the church. The position of The Church of Jesus Christ is that Rigdon should have been allowed to be what he claimed to be—a "guardian" over the church until proper proceedings could decide the next church president. The Church of Jesus Christ maintains the proceedings which decided Brigham Young to lead the church were a violation of proper proceedings of the church.

On December 27, 1847, when Young organized a new First Presidency, the Quorum of the Twelve only had seven of its twelve members present to represent a council to decide the presidency. William Smith, John E. Page, and Lyman Wight had previously denounced the proceedings and were not present. John Taylor and Parley P. Pratt were in the Salt Lake Valley and could not have known of the proceedings. This left just seven present, a majority of one meaning Young would have to vote for himself in order to gain a majority quorum vote in favor of his leadership. Young chose two of the other apostles, Heber C. Kimball and Willard Richards, as his counselors in the First Presidency. This left only four members of the Quorum of the Twelve present to vote in favor of creation of the new First Presidency: Orson Hyde, Wilford Woodruff, George A. Smith, and Orson Pratt. The Church of Jesus Christ views this action as a violation of church law compromising the authority of Sidney Rigdon without a majority quorum vote. The LDS Church actively opposes this view of the proceedings.

After his excommunication by the Common Council of the Church and under serious persecution, Rigdon returned to Pennsylvania. The actual authority of the Common Council of the Church to execute this action is a controversial topic between many organizations within the Latter Day Saint movement. Rigdon had been stationed in Pennsylvania in order to run for vice president along with Joseph Smith. Rigdon toured the eastern branches of the church in late 1844 and early 1845, gathering leaders to his cause. He was joined by former members of the First Presidency, John C. Bennett and William Law and also by former Apostle William E. M'Lellin.

On April 6, 1845—fifteen years after the original organization of the church—Rigdon presided over a General Conference of Rigdonite Latter Day Saints in Pittsburgh, establishing a new hierarchy. He himself was sustained as President of the Church. The new Quorum of the Twelve Apostles consisted of: William E. M'Lellin, George W. Robinson, Benjamin Winchester, James Blakeslee, Josiah Ells, Hugh Herringshaw, David L. Lathrop, Jeremiah Hatch Jr., E.R. Swackhammer, William Small, Samuel Bennett. Carvel Rigdon became Presiding Patriarch, and a Standing High Council, Quorum of the Seventy, Presiding Bishopric, and other quorum presidencies were established. In addition, Rigdon called seventy-three men and boys to a "Grand Council," perhaps an adaptation of the Council of Fifty. Also at the conference, the new church organization formally returned its name to the 1830 church's original name, the "Church of Christ." After this group disorganized, William Bickerton re-organized the church today known as The Church of Jesus Christ.

== Aftermath and reorganization ==
The majority of Latter Day Saints in the Nauvoo area accepted the leadership of the Quorum of the Twelve Apostles, either immediately or within the following two decades. In 1846, this group was forced to leave their homes and the newly built Mormon temple in Nauvoo because of mounting conflict and persecutions (the temple was destroyed two years later, in October 1848). The saints began to migrate west, though slowly at first because of the harsh winters; the wagon trains halted at Winter Quarters, Nebraska before eventually leaving to settle in the Great Basin in what is now Utah.

In 1847, Brigham Young and the other Apostles formed a new First Presidency. Young, who had already been sustained as the President of the Quorum of the Twelve Apostles, thus became the president of what is now known as the Church of Jesus Christ of Latter-day Saints (LDS Church), the largest sect of Mormonism by a factor of fifty (with 16,118,169 members worldwide, as of December 31, 2017). His two counselors were Heber C. Kimball and Willard Richards, the latter of whom was present when Joseph Smith was killed. Young's succession became a precedent without exception within the sect based in Utah; with the death of each president, the First Presidency is dissolved and one member of the Quorum of the Twelve Apostles becomes the new president. Members of the LDS Church are asked to sustain the new prophet and his counselors at a solemn assembly during the next General Conference.

Sidney Rigdon's church dissolved a few years after its organization, but it was reorganized as The Church of Jesus Christ in 1862, which still exists. They view Young's assumption of power as a violation of church law compromising the authority of Sidney Rigdon without a majority quorum vote.

James J. Strang's leadership was based predominantly on his own claim to be a prophet called by God. When he was mortally wounded by assassins in 1856, he refused to name a successor, leaving the matter in God's hands. When no prophet appeared, the bulk of his church dissolved, though a few loyal congregations remain today.

Many of the Latter Day Saints who remained in the Midwest, including Strang, believed that one or more of Joseph Smith's sons would eventually lead the church. The church had published a revelation in 1841 stating "I say unto my servant Joseph, In thee, and in thy seed, shall the kindred of the earth be blessed", and this was widely interpreted as endorsing the concept of Lineal Succession. Accounts written after Smith's death indicate that Smith set apart his son as his successor at certain private meetings and public gatherings, including Liberty and Nauvoo. Within the years following Smith's murder, Brigham Young apparently made earnest entreaties to his sons, Joseph Smith III and David Hyrum Smith, to join his church's hierarchy in Utah, which may represent some recognition by Young of the patrilineal right of succession for Smith’s sons. Both Smiths, however, were profoundly opposed to a number of practices of the church in Utah, especially plural marriage, and refused to join with them.

Eventually, many Latter Day Saints in the Midwest coalesced behind the leadership of Jason W. Briggs, Zenas H. Gurley, William Marks and others. In the late 1850s, they proposed a more solid church structure, sometimes referred to in contemporary sources as the New Organization, and like other Latter Day Saint groups asked Joseph Smith III to be their president. Smith III refused to lead any church unless he felt inspired to do so. By 1860, he reported that he had received such inspiration and became Prophet/President of the Church of Jesus Christ of Latter Day Saints on April 6. Smith III stated at that conference in Amboy, Illinois:

I would say to you, brethren, as I hope you may be, and in faith I trust you are, as a people that God has promised his blessings upon, I came not here of myself, but by the influence of the Spirit. For some time past I have received manifestations pointing to the position which I am about to assume. I wish to say that I have come here not to be dictated by any men or set of men. I have come in obedience to a power not my own, and shall be dictated by the power that sent me.

Joseph Smith's widow Emma, as well as Joseph III's two brothers, affiliated with this organization. A decade later the group added the word Reorganized to the official church name to distinguish it from the much larger group in Utah. For a time until the start of the twentieth century, leaders of both this group and the Utah group were Smith first cousins. The church is now referred to as the Community of Christ.

There were several other Latter Day Saint branches in Bloomington, Crow Creek, Half Moon Prairie, and Eagle Creek, Illinois, and Vermillion, Indiana, each left leaderless after the 1844 succession crisis. In 1863, these groups united under the leadership of Granville Hedrick. This group inherited the name "Church of Christ" and became known popularly as the Hedrickites. Today, this small church has ownership of a large portion of the temple site in Independence, Missouri, and its members are commonly known as the Temple Lot Mormons.

== See also ==
- Mormonism in the 19th century
