= Church of Christ (Brewsterite) =

The Church of Christ was a schismatic sect from the Latter Day Saint movement that was founded in 1848 by James C. Brewster and Hazen Aldrich. Because of the church's belief that Brewster was a prophet, the group is often called the Brewsterites.

== History ==
After the mob killing of Joseph Smith, apostle William E. McLellin and other early church leaders returned to Kirtland, Ohio, to pick up the remnants of the church there. The group adopted the original name of the Latter Day Saint church, the "Church of Christ". Two principles of the movement were to (1) accept David Whitmer as leader, and (2) declare Kirtland as the proper center of the church.

At the organization of the church in Springfield, Illinois, Hazen Aldrich was selected as the organization's first president. He selected James C. Brewster and Jackson Goodale (1816–1896) as his counselors in the First Presidency. The church published a periodical known as the Olive Branch, which often contained revelations that Brewster had obtained. Notable adherents included John E. Page, one of the original members of the Quorum of the Twelve.

Because Brewster lived in Springfield, the newspaper eventually moved operation to Illinois. In October 1849, a newspaper article indicated that Kirtland was a temporary headquarters, and they planned to move to California. On June 23, 1849, the group held a General Assembly in the Kirtland Temple. Six members accepted Brewster's revelation to move to California.

In 1850, Brewster declared that there was a land called "Bashan" in the Rio Grande Valley that God had selected as the new gathering place for the church. In 1851, Brewster and Goodale led a wagon train of followers to find Bashan, while Aldrich—who had begun to doubt Brewster's prophetic abilities—remained behind in Kirtland.

There were disagreements between Brewster and Goodale and the other members of the church on the journey to Bashan, and most of Brewster's followers, including Olive Oatman and her family, deserted Brewster and headed for California. Brewster returned to Illinois and the church was never reorganized.

== See also ==
- Whitmerites
