= David Whitmer =

Book of Mormon witness (1805–1888)

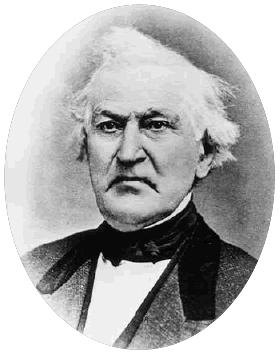

President of the Church (Church of Christ—Whitmerites)
- January 28, 1876 – January 25, 1888
- Successor: John C. Whitmer
- Reason: Reorganized

President of the Church (Church of Christ—Whitmerites)
- September 7, 1847 – ca. 1848
- Reason: William E. McLellin asserted Whitmer's claim
- End reason: Separated from McLellin.

President High Council
- July 3, 1834 – January 1838
- Reason: Elected by vote of the Council.
- End reason: Vote of the Council.

President of Zion
- July 7, 1834 – February 5, 1838
- End reason: Vote of members.

Latter Day Saint Apostle
- June 1829 – June 1838
- Called by: Joseph Smith
- End reason: Separated from the Church

Mayor of Richmond, Missouri

In office
- May 23, 1867 – January 1, 1868

Councilman

In office
- pre-1867 – pre-1867

Personal details
- Born: January 7, 1805; Harrisburg, Pennsylvania, U.S.
- Died: January 25, 1888 (aged 83); Richmond, Missouri, U.S.
- Resting place: Richmond Cemetery; 39.279°N 93.986°W
- Baptism Date: June 3, 1829
- Known For: Book of Mormon Witness; Founding Church Member
- Notable works: A Proclamation (1881); An Address To Believers in the Book of Mormon (1887); An Address to All Believers in Christ (1887)
- Spouse(s): Julia Ann Jolly (m. 1831)
- Children: 2
- Parents: Peter Whitmer Sr. Mary Musselman Whitmer
- Relatives: Christian Whitmer (brother); Jacob Whitmer (brother); John Whitmer (brother); Peter Whitmer Jr. (brother); Hiram Page (brother-in-law); Oliver Cowdery (brother-in-law)
- Signature
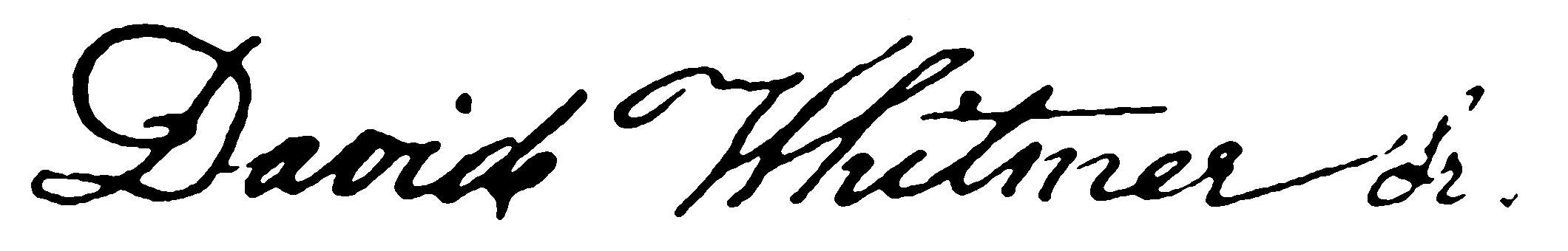

David Whitmer (January 7, 1805 – January 25, 1888) was an early leader of the Latter Day Saint Movement and one of the Three Witnesses to the gold plates of the Book of Mormon. Whitmer later distanced himself from Joseph Smith and was excommunicated from the church in 1838, but continued to affirm his testimony of the Book of Mormon. He separated, mainly troubled by polygamy, and created an offshoot of the LDS church called the Church of Christ. He was the most-interviewed Book of Mormon witness.

== Early life ==
Whitmer was born near Harrisburg, Pennsylvania, on January 7, 1805, the fourth of nine children of Peter Whitmer Sr. and Mary Musselman. Whitmer's ancestry on both sides of his family was German, and the family spoke with a German accent. His grandfather was George Witmer, who was born in Prussia, and his great-grandfather was born in Switzerland. Whitmer had five brothers and three sisters, one of which died in 1813 in her infancy. He grew up attending a Presbyterian church. By the 1820s, the Whitmer family had moved to a farm in Fayette, in New York's Finger Lakes area. On March 12, 1825, Whitmer was elected sergeant in a newly organized militia called the Seneca Grenadiers.

== Role in the early Latter Day Saint movement ==
Whitmer and his family were among the earliest adherents to the Latter Day Saint movement. Whitmer first heard of Mormonism and the golden plates in 1828 when he made a business trip to Palmyra, New York, and talked with his friend Oliver Cowdery, who believed that there "must be some truth to the matter". Cowdery continued to write Whitmer letters concerning the matter, which Whitmer then shared with his parents and siblings. One of Cowdery's letters inquired as to whether the Whitmers would be willing to provide the Smiths with lodging and a place to complete the translation of the Book of Mormon. The family agreed, and Joseph Smith, his wife, Emma Smith, and Cowdery came to the Whitmer farm to live on June 1, 1829. The translation was completed about a month later.

=== Book of Mormon witness ===
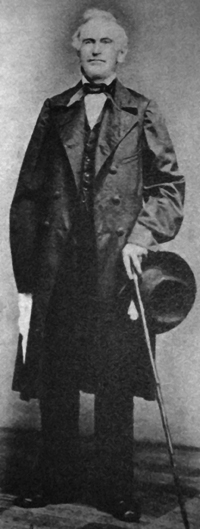
Whitmer by R. B. Rice, c. 1864

Whitmer was baptized in June 1829, nearly a year prior to the formal organization of the Church of Christ. During that same month, Whitmer said that he, along with Smith and Cowdery, saw an angel present the golden plates in a vision. Martin Harris reported that he experienced a similar vision with Smith later in the day. Evidence places this event near Whitmer's father's home in Fayette, New York, on June 28, 1829. Later, in an 1878 testimony, Whitmer claimed to have seen a light, "not like the light of the sun, nor like that of a fire, but more glorious and beautiful". He then went on to describe a table appearing with the golden plates, the Urim and Thummim, and other objects referenced in the Book of Mormon narrative. Whitmer continued: "I heard the voice of the Lord, as distinctly as I ever heard anything in my life, declaring that the records of the plates of the Book of Mormon were translated by the gift and power of God." Whitmer, Cowdery, and Harris signed a joint statement declaring their testimony to the reality of the vision. The statement was published in the first edition of the Book of Mormon and has been included in nearly every subsequent edition.

=== Founding church member ===
When Smith organized the Church of Christ on April 6, 1830, Whitmer was one of six original members. In 1835, Whitmer assisted Cowdery and Harris in selecting and ordaining the first Quorum of the Twelve Apostles of the church. He also participated in some of the earliest missionary trips, accompanying Joseph Smith and baptizing new converts.

=== Church offices ===
Whitmer had been ordained an elder of the church by June 9, 1830, and he was ordained to the office of high priest by Cowdery on October 5, 1831. Soon after the organization of the church, Smith specified Jackson County, Missouri, as a "gathering place" for Latter Day Saints. According to Smith, the area would be the "center place" of the City of Zion, the New Jerusalem. On July 7, 1834, Smith ordained Whitmer to be the president of the church in Missouri and his own successor, should Smith "not live to God".

By virtue of his position as President of the High Council in Zion, David Whitmer was sustained as "the president of the church in Zion," not merely as a Stake President. Since the Quorum of the Twelve and the First Quorum of the Seventy had not yet been organized, this meant that there was a short period of time—from July 3, 1834, until February 14, 1835—when the High Council in Zion stood in an administrative position next to the First Presidency. It also meant that from July 3, 1834, until December 5, 1834, at which time Oliver Cowdery was made the Associate President of the Church, David Whitmer, as President of the High Council in Zion, was the Prophet's rightful successor."

Cowdery and Whitmer were also called to "search out" twelve "disciples", who would become the Quorum of the Twelve.

== Separation from the church ==
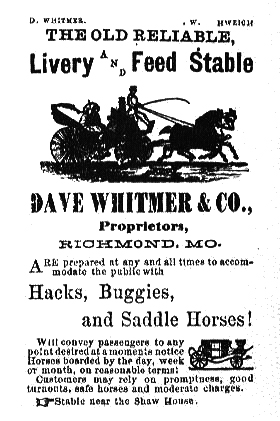
Advertisement for Whitmer's livery stable

Whitmer continued to live in Kirtland, Ohio, and his counselors, W. W. Phelps and John Whitmer (Whitmer's brother) presided over the church in Missouri until the summer of 1837. After the collapse of the Kirtland Safety Society bank, Smith and his counselor Sidney Rigdon, battered by creditors, moved to Far West, Missouri, to evade arrest. The ensuing leadership struggle led to the dissolution of the presidency of the church in Missouri. Whitmer resigned and separated from the church. He was formally excommunicated from the church on the grounds of breaking the Word of Wisdom, neglecting his leadership duties, meeting with the other "Kirtland apostates", and circulating unfavorable information about Joseph Smith.

Whitmer and the other excommunicated Latter-day Saints became known as the "dissenters". Some of the dissenters owned land in Caldwell County, Missouri, which they wanted to retain. The church presidency and other members looked unfavorably upon them. Rigdon preached his "Salt Sermon", which called for their expulsion from the county. A number of Latter Day Saints formed a secret society known as the Danites, whose stated goal was removal of the dissenters. Eighty prominent Mormons signed the so-called Danite Manifesto, which warned the dissenters to "depart or a more fatal calamity shall befall you." Shortly afterward, Whitmer and his family fled to nearby Richmond, Missouri.

Whitmer, other dissenters, and Mormons loyal to Smith complained to the non-Mormons in northwestern Missouri about their forcible expulsion and the loss of their properties and began to file lawsuits to recover them.

Tensions escalated, bringing about the 1838 Mormon War, after which Governor Boggs issued the Mormon Extermination Order in October 1838, authorizing deadly force in the removal of Mormons. Consequently, most of the Latter Day Saints were expelled from Missouri by early 1839.

In 1887, Whitmer used his position as one of the Three Witnesses to condemn the church in response to these 1838 "persecutions" from a "secret organization" formed within the church that denounced "dissenters": "If you believe my testimony to the Book of Mormon", wrote Whitmer, "if you believe that God spake to us three witnesses by his own voice, then I tell you that in June, 1838, God spake to me again by his own voice from the heavens and told me to 'separate myself from among the Latter Day Saints, for as they sought to do unto me, so it should be done unto them.'" Whitmer interpreted God's command to include both the Church of Jesus Christ of Latter-day Saints (LDS Church) and the Reorganized Church of Jesus Christ of Latter Day Saints, (RLDS Church, now known as the Community Of Christ): "God commanded me by his voice to stand apart from you."

Whitmer continued to live in Richmond, where he operated a livery stable and was elected mayor, a position he held from 1867 to 1868.

== President of the Church of Christ (Whitmerite) ==
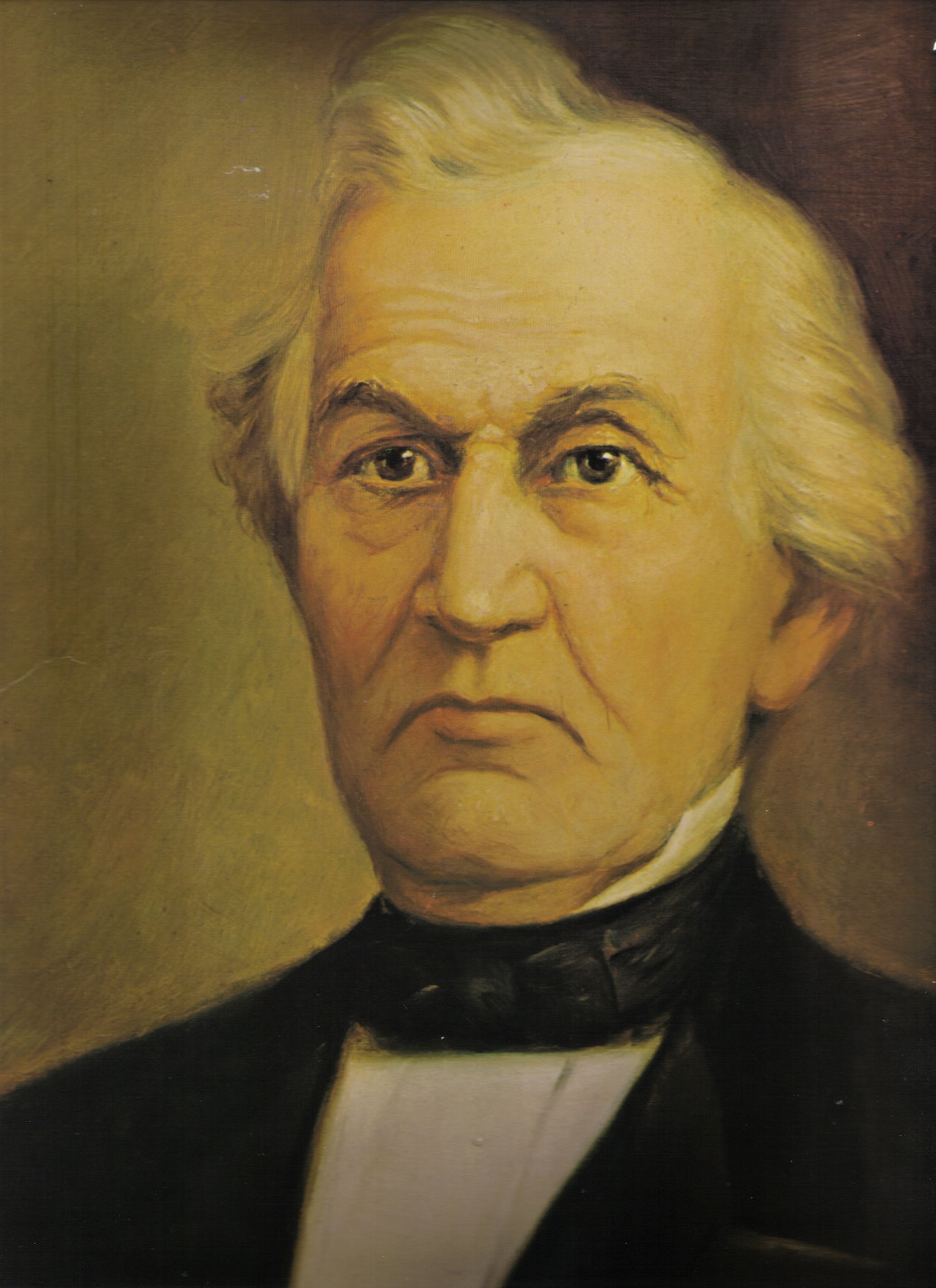
Portrait of David Whitmer by Lewis A. Ramsey

After the killing of Smith in 1844, several rival leaders claimed to be Smith's successor, including Brigham Young, Sidney Rigdon, and James Strang. Many of Rigdon's followers became disillusioned by 1847 and some, including apostle William E. McLellin and Benjamin Winchester, remembered Whitmer's 1834 ordination to be Smith's successor. At McLellin's urging, Whitmer exercised his claim to be Smith's successor and the Church of Christ (Whitmerite) was formed in Kirtland, Ohio. However, Whitmer never joined the body of the new church and it dissolved relatively quickly.

Around this time, fellow Book of Mormon witness Oliver Cowdery began to correspond with Whitmer. After traveling from Ohio to Kanesville (Council Bluffs), Iowa Cowdery attended the Kanesville Tabernacle meeting, called to sustain Brigham Young as the new President of the Church. Cowdery bore, with conviction, his testimony of the truthfulness of everything that had happened spiritually regarding Smith and the Book of Mormon. Meeting with Young at Winter Quarters, Nebraska, he requested readmission into the church, and he was re-baptized into the church there. Cowdery then traveled to meet with Whitmer in Richmond to persuade him to move west and rejoin the Saints in Utah Territory. Cowdery, however, succumbed to tuberculosis and died March 3, 1850.

In January 1876, Whitmer resurrected the Church of Christ (Whitmerite) by ordaining his nephew, John C. Whitmer, an elder, and giving him the title "First Elder".

In 1887, Whitmer published a pamphlet entitled "An Address to All Believers in Christ", in which he affirmed his testimony of the Book of Mormon, but denounced the other branches of the Latter Day Saint movement. Whitmer died in Richmond. The Whitmerite church survived until the 1960s.

== Religious views ==
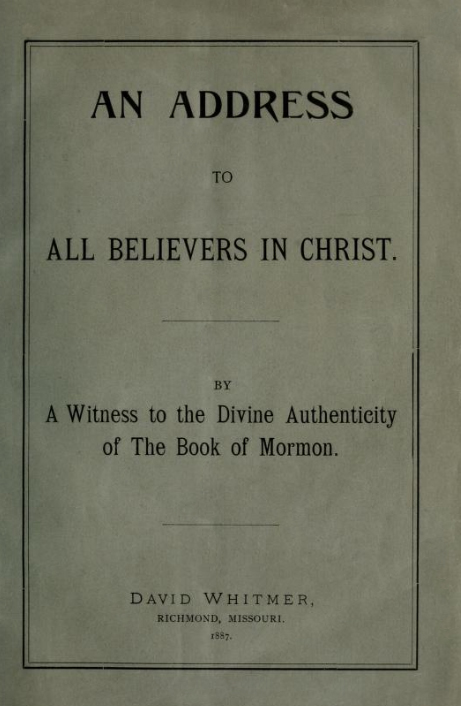
Address to Believers

Whitmer stated his religious views in three publications: "A Proclamation" published March 24, 1881, "An Address To Believers in the Book of Mormon" published April 1887, and "An Address to All Believers in Christ" also published April 1887.

=== Polygamy ===
I do not endorse polygamy or spiritual wifeism. It is a great evil, shocking to the moral sense, and the more so, because practiced in the name of religion. It is of man and not God, and is especially forbidden in the Book of Mormon itself.

=== High Priests ===
As to the High Priesthood, Jesus Christ himself is the last Great High Priest, this too after the order of Melchisedec, as I understand the Holy Scriptures.

=== Name change ===
I do not endorse the change of the name of the church, for as the wife takes the name of her husband so should the Church of the Lamb of God, take the name of its head, even Christ himself. It is the Church of Christ.

== The most interviewed Book of Mormon witness ==
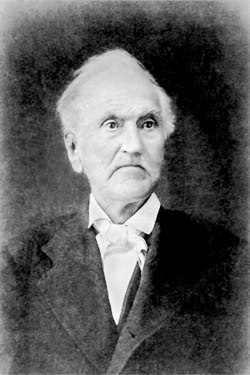
Photo of David Whitmer, c. 1880s

Because Cowdery died in 1850 at age 43 and Martin Harris died in 1875 at age 92, Whitmer was the only survivor of the Three Witnesses for 13 years. At Richmond, Missouri, he sometimes received several inquirers daily asking about his connection to the Book of Mormon, including missionaries of the LDS Church who were traveling from Utah Territory to the eastern United States and Europe. Despite his hostility toward the LDS Church, Whitmer always stood by his claim that he had actually seen the golden plates.

Some of the 71 recorded interviews he gave between 1838 and 1888 contained different details than others. Recounting the vision to Orson Pratt in 1878, Whitmer claimed to have seen not only the golden plates but the "Brass Plates, the plates containing the record of the wickedness of the people of the world [...] the sword of Laban, the Directors (i.e. the ball which Lehi had) and the Interpreters. I saw them just as plain as I see this bed".

In 1880, John Murphy interviewed Whitmer and later published an account suggesting that perhaps Whitmer's experience was a "delusion or perhaps a cunning scheme". Murphy's account said that Whitmer had not been able to describe the appearance of an angel and had likened Whitmer's experience to the "impressions as the quaker [receives] when the spirit moves, or as a good Methodist in giving a happy experience." Whitmer responded by publishing "A Proclamation", reaffirming his testimony and saying:

It having been represented by one John Murphy, of Polo, Caldwell County, Mo., that I, in a conversation with him last summer, denied my testimony as one of the three witnesses to the BOOK OF MORMON. To the end, therefore, that he may understand me now, if he did not then; and that the world may know the truth, I wish now, standing as it were, in the very sunset of life, and in the fear of God, once for all to make this public statement: That I have never at any time denied that testimony or any part thereof, which has so long since been published with that Book, as one of the three witnesses. Those who know me best, well know that I have always adhered to that testimony. And that no man may be misled or doubt my present views in regard to the same, I do again affirm the truth of all of my statements, as then made and published. He that hath an ear to hear, let him hear; it was no delusion!

To the "Proclamation" Whitmer attached an affidavit attesting to his honesty and standing in the community. Whitmer ordered that his testimony to the Book of Mormon be placed on his tombstone.

In response to a question by Anthony Metcalf, Whitmer attempted to clarify the "spiritual" versus "natural" viewing of the plates:

In regards to my testimony to the visitation of the angel, who declared to us Three Witnesses that the Book of Mormon is true, I have this to say: Of course we were in the spirit when we had the view, for no man can behold the face of an angel, except in a spiritual view, but we were in the body also, and everything was as natural to us, as it is at any time. Martin Harris, you say, called it 'being in vision.' We read in the Scriptures, Cornelius saw, in a vision, an angel of God. Daniel saw an angel in a vision, also in other places it states they saw an angel in the spirit. A bright light enveloped us where we were, that filled at noon day, and there in a vision, or in the spirit, we saw and heard just as it is stated in my testimony in the Book of Mormon. I am now passed eighty-two years old, and I have a brother, J. J. Snyder, to do my writing for me, at my dictation. [Signed] David Whitmer.

=== Interviews of David Whitmer ===
The following table shows which interviews were cited in the following publications:

- Kenneth W. Godfrey, "David Whitmer and the Shaping of Latter-day Saint History," in The Disciple As Witness: Essays on Latter-Day Saint History and Doctrine in Honor of Richard Lloyd Anderson, edited by Richard Lloyd Anderson, Stephen D. Ricks, Donald W. Parry, and Andrew H. Hedges, Provo: FARMS, 2000, pp. 223–56.
- Lyndon W. Cook, David Whitmer Interviews, Grandin Book, 1991.
- Dan Vogel, Early Mormon Documents, Vol. V, Signature Books, 2003.
- John W. Welch and Erick B. Carlson eds., Opening the Heavens, Accounts of Divine Manifestations 1820–1844, Deseret Book, 2005. Twenty-one interviews were cited, the "x-#" refers to the document number in this volume only.
- Richard Lloyd Anderson, Investigating the Book of Mormon Witnesses, Deseret Book, 1981.

Interviewer	Interview date	Name of publication	Publication date	Godfrey	Cook	Vogel	Welch	Anderson
Eber D. Howe	1834	Mormonism Unvailed	1834			x		
Lumon Andros Shurtliff	August 21, 1836	Autobriography, LDS Church Archives	1852–1876			x		
Thomas B. Marsh	1838	Deseret News	March 24, 1858	x		x		
David H. Cannon	1861	Beatrice Cannon Evans and Janath Russell Cannon, eds. Cannon Family Historical Treasury, 250.	1967			x		
David H. Cannon	1861	A. Karl Larson and Katherine Miles Larson, eds., Diary of Charles Lowell Walker, 1773—74, (June 11, 1894).	1980	x	x	x		
Davis H. Bays	September 13, 1869	Saints' Herald	November 1, 1869	x		x		
Henry Moon	January 9, 1872	Deseret Evening News	April 10, 1872	x		x		x
Eri B. Mullin	1874	Saints' Herald 27, 76	March 1, 1880	x		x	x-83	
James Caffall	August 1874	Saints' Herald	September 15, 1874	x		x		
Mark H. Forscutt	March 2, 1875	Scrapbook, 16–17, reproduced in Inez Smith Davis The Story of the Church. Independence, Missouri: Herald House, 75	1964			x		
Chicago Times reporter	August 1875	Chicago Times	August 7, 1875	x		x		x
Dr. James N. Seymour	December 8, 1875	Saints' Herald 26, 223 (Letter from Whitmer)	1879		x	x		x
Thomas Wood Smith	January 1876	Fall River Herald (Massachusetts)	March 28, 1879			x	x-80	
Thomas Wood Smith	January 1876	Saints' Herald 27, 13	January 1, 1880	x		x	x-82	
Edward Stevenson	22—December 23, 1877	Diary of Edward Stevenson, LDS Church Archives		x		x		x
Edward Stevenson	22—December 23, 1877	Journal History, LDS Church Archives		x		x		
Edward Stevenson	22—December 23, 1877	Salt Lake Herald	February 2, 1878	x		x		
Edward Stevenson	22—December 23, 1877	Reminiscences of Joseph, the Prophet and the Coming Forth of the Book of Mormon	1893			x		
Joseph Smith III	February 2, 1878	Community of Christ Library Archives (letter)			x	x		
P. Wilhelm Poulson	August 13, 1878	Deseret Evening News	August 16, 1878	x		x	x-79	x
Orson Pratt, Joseph F. Smith	7—September 8, 1878	Joseph F. Smith Diary, LDS Church Archives		x				x
Orson Pratt, Joseph F. Smith	7—September 8, 1878	Deseret News	November 16, 1878	x				
Orson Pratt, Joseph F. Smith	7—September 8, 1878	Orson Pratt correspondence, LDS Church Archives		x	x	x		
Orson Pratt, Joseph F. Smith	7—September 8, 1878	Andrew Jenson, Historical Record 6, 1886, 210.	1886				x-78	
Orson Pratt, Joseph F. Smith	7—September 8, 1878	Joseph F. Smith Collection, LDS Church Archives		x				
Orson Pratt, Joseph F. Smith	7—September 8, 1878	Brian H. Stuy. Collected Discourses, Burbank: B.H.S. Pub. vol 2	1987–92			x		
William E. McLellin	June 1879	William E. McLellin Collection, New York Public Library. (Letter to James T. Cobb)	August 14, 1880		x	x		
J. L. Traughber Jr.	October 1879	Saints' Herald 26, 341	November 15, 1879	x			x-81	
J. L. Traughber	October 1879	T. A. Schroeder Papers, New York Public Library. (Letter to Theodore A. Schroeder)	August 21, 1901					
Heman C. Smith	December 5, 1876	Community of Christ Library Archives (Letter)			x	x		
John Murphy	June 1880	Hamiltonian	January 21, 1881			x		x
John Murphy	June 1880	Kingston Times	December 16, 1887			x		
E. S. Gilbert	August 1, 1880	New Light on Mormonism by Ellen E. Dickson, New York: Funk and Wagnalls.	1885			x		
David Whitmer	March 19, 1881	"Proclamation" - Leaflet	March 19, 1881			x		x
David Whitmer	March 19, 1881	"Proclamation" in Richmond Conservator	March 24, 1881			x		x
David Whitmer	March 19, 1881	"Proclamation" in Hamiltonian	April 8, 1881			x		
David Whitmer	March 19, 1881	"Proclamation" in Saints' Herald	June 1, 1881			x		
David Whitmer	March 19, 1881	"Proclamation" in "Address to All Believers in Christ"	April 1, 1887			x		
Jesse R. Badham	March 20, 1881	Diary of Jesse R. Badham, RLDS Church Library—Archives		x	x	x		
Jesse R. Badham	March 20, 1881	Saints' Herald	April 1, 1881	x	x	x		
Kansas City Daily Journal reporter	June 1, 1881	Kansas City Daily Journal	June 5, 1881	x			x-84	x
David Whitmer's corrections to Kansas City Daily Journal	(June 13, 1881)	Kansas City Daily Journal	June 19, 1881	x			x-85	
Chicago Times correspondent	October 14, 1881	Chicago Times	October 17, 1881	x			x-86	x
Edwin Gordon Woolley	1882	Diary of Edwin Gordon Woolley, BYU Library—Archives		x	x	x		
Edwin Gordon Woolley	1882	E. G. Woolley Biography, BYU Library—Archives		x				
William H. Kelley, G. A. Blakeslee	January 15, 1882	Saints' Herald 29, 68	March 1, 1882	x			x-87	x
Joseph Smith III et al.	April 4, 1882	Saints' Herald	May 1, 1882	x	x	x		
John Morgan, Matthias F. Cowley	April 13, 1882	John Morgan Diary, LDS Church Archives		x	x	x		
John Morgan, Matthias F. Cowley	April 13, 1882	Arthur M. Richardson and Nicholas G. Morgan.The Life and Ministry of John Morgan. 323	1965	x	x	x		
John Morgan, Matthias F. Cowley	April 13, 1882	Diary of Matthias F. Cowley, LDS Church Archives		x	x	x		
J. W. Chatburn	No date	Saints' Herald	June 15, 1882	x				
S. T. Mouch	November 18, 1882	Whitmer Papers, Community of Christ Library Archives (Letter from Whitmer).			x	x		
Moroni Pratt, S. R. Marks, et al.	June 30, 1883	Bear Lake Democrat	July 3 & 14, 1883	x	x	x		
Moroni Pratt, S. R. Marks, et al.	June 30, 1883	Deseret News	July 19 & 21, 1883	x	x	x		
James H. Hart	August 21, 1883	James H. Hart Notebook (see Mormon in Motion: The Life and Journals of James H. Hart, 1825—1906 [Windsor Books, 1976], 216)		x				
James H. Hart	August 23, 1883	Deseret Evening News	September 4, 1883	x				x
James H. Hart	August 21, 1883	Bear Lake Democrat	September 15, 1883	x				
James H. Hart	August 21, 1883	Contributor 5, 9–10	October 1883	x		x		
James H. Hart	August 21, 1883	"An Interview with David Whitmer in August, 1883" (poem)	1883			x		
George Q. Cannon	February 27, 1884	George Q. Cannon Journal, LDS Church Archives		x			x-90	
George Q. Cannon	February 27, 1884	Instructor 80, 520	1945					x
James H. Hart	March 10, 1884	Deseret Evening News	March 25, 1884	x			x-89	
James H. Hart	March 10, 1884	Deseret Evening News	April 10, 1884	x				
James H. Hart	March 10, 1884	Bear Lake Democrat	March 28, 1884	x				
E. C. Briggs, Rudolph Etzenhouser	April 25, 1884	Saints' Herald 31, 396–97	June 21, 1884	x			x-88	
J. Frank McDowell	May 8, 1884	Saints' Herald	July 22 and August 9, 1884	x	x	x		
Heman C. Smith, William H. Kelley	June 19, 1884	Saints' Herald 31, 442	July 12, 1884	x	x	x		x
Heman C. Smith, William H. Kelley	June 19, 1884	Joseph Smith III, Heman C. Smith, and F. Henry Edwards. The History of the Reorganized Church of Jesus Christ of Latter Day Saints. Independence, Missouri: Herald House, 4:448–49	1968		x	x		
Joseph Smith III et al.	mid-July 1884	Saints' Herald	January 28, 1936	x				
St. Louis Republican	mid-July 1884	St. Louis Republican	July 16, 1884	x			x-91	
Unknown	July 1884	"The True Book of Mormon" unknown newspaper clipping in William H. Samson Scrapbook, 18:76–77, Rochester Public Library.	July 1884			x		
B. H. Roberts	1884	Contributor 9, 169	March 1888			x		
B. H. Roberts	1884	Millennial Star 50, 120	February 20, 1888			x		
B. H. Roberts	1884	Conference Report, 126	October 1926			x		
Editor	January 9, 1885	Richmond Conservator (statement)	January 9, 1885		x	x		
Zenas H. Gurley	January 14, 1885	Gurley Collection, LDS Church Archives	January 21, 1885	x			x-92	
Zenas H. Gurley	January 14, 1885	Autumn Leaves 5, 452	1892					x
E. C. Brand	February 8, 1885	Kingston Times (Missouri)	December 23, 1887			x		
Franklin D. Richards and Charles C. Richards	May 25, 1885	Charles C. Richards, "An Address Delivered by Charles C. Richards at the Sacrament Meeting Held in SLC, UT, Sunday Evening, April 20, 1947," signed. LDS Church Archives.	1947			x		
James H. Moyle	June 28, 1885	James H. Moyle Journal, LDS Church Archives		x				x
James H. Moyle	June 28, 1885	November 24, 1928 reminiscence		x				
James H. Moyle	June 28, 1885	Conference Report	April 1930	x				
James H. Moyle	June 28, 1885	Deseret News [Church Section]	August 2, 1944	x				
James H. Moyle	June 28, 1885	Instructor	1945	x				x
Chicago Tribune correspondent	December 15, 1885	Chicago Tribune	December 17, 1885	x			x-93	x
Edward Stevenson	February 9, 1886	Diary of Edward Stevenson, LDS Church Archives		x				
Edward Stevenson	February 9, 1886	Millennial Star	March 8, 1886	x				
Edward Stevenson	February 9, 1886	Utah Journal	March 10, 1886	x				
Nathan Tanner, Jr.	April 13, 1886	Nathan Tanner, Jr. Journal, LDS Church Archives		x				x
Nathan Tanner, Jr.	April 13, 1886	Tanner reminiscence, LDS Church Archives		x				
Nathan Tanner, Jr.	May 1886	Nathan A. Tanner, Jr. to Nathan A. Tanner, LDS Church Archives	February 17, 1909				x-98	
Omaha Herald correspondent	October 10, 1886	Omaha Herald	October 17, 1886	x			x-94	x
Omaha Herald correspondent	October 10, 1886	Chicago Inter-Ocean	October 17, 1886				x-94	
Omaha Herald correspondent	October 10, 1886	Saints' Herald, 33:706	November 13, 1886				x-94	
D. C. Dunbar	October 10, 1886	Dunbar correspondence, LDS Church Archives		x				
M. J. Hubble	November 13, 1886	Missouri State Historical Society, Columbia, Missouri		x			x-95	
Edward Stevenson	January 2, 1887	Diary of Edward Stevenson, LDS Church Archives		x				
Edward Stevenson	January 2, 1887	Juvenile Instructor	February 15, 1887	x				
Edward Stevenson	January 2, 1887	Millennial Star	February 14, 1887	x				
David Whitmer		"An Address to All Believers in Christ: By a Witness to the Divine Authenticity of the Book of Mormon", Richmond, Missouri	1887			x	x-96	x
Edward Stevenson	January 2, 1887	Juvenile Instructor	January 1, 1889	x				
Sister Gates	February 11, 1887	Whitmer Papers, Community of Christ Library Archives. (Letter from Whitmer)			x	x		
Robert Nelson	February 15, 1887	Whitmer Papers, Community of Christ Library Archives. (Letter from Whitmer)			x	x		
Anthony Metcalf	March 1887	Ten Years Before the Mast, 74	1888 Malad, Idaho					x
Angus M. Cannon	January 7, 1888	Angus M. Cannon Diary, LDS Church Archives		x	x	x		
Angus M. Cannon	January 7, 1888	Deseret Evening News	February 13, 1888	x	x	x		x
Chicago Tribune correspondent	January 23, 1888	Chicago Tribune	January 24, 1888	x				
Unidentified Chicago man	[No date]	Chicago Times	January 26, 1888	x	x	x		x
Richmond Conservator report	January 26, 1888	Richmond Conservator	January 26, 1888	x	x	x		x
Richmond Democrat report	January 1888	Richmond Democrat (Borrowed from Omaha Herald. Article written by Joe Johnson)	January 26, 1888	x				x
Richmond Democrat report	January 1888	Richmond Democrat (re-run)	February 2, 1888				x-97	x
John C. Whitmer	September 1888	Deseret News	September 13 & 17, 1888			x		
John C. Whitmer	September 1888	Saints' Herald (Reprint of Deseret News)	October 13, 1888			x		
George W. Schweich	1899	Woodbridge I. Riley. The Founder of Mormonism. New York: Dodd, Mead and Co., 1903, 219–20. (Letter from George W. Schweich to I. Woodbridge)	September 22, 1899		x	x		
Philander Page	January 25, 1888	George Edward Anderson Diary, Daughters of Utah Pioneers Museum, 27–28.	1907			x		
John J. Snyder	1886–87	W. H. Cadman. A History of the Church of Jesus Christ, Organized at Green Oak, Pennsylvania, U.S.A., in the Year 1862. Monongola, Pennsylvania: The Church of Jesus Christ, 1945, 24–25.	October 10, 1928			x		
