= History of the Latter Day Saint movement =

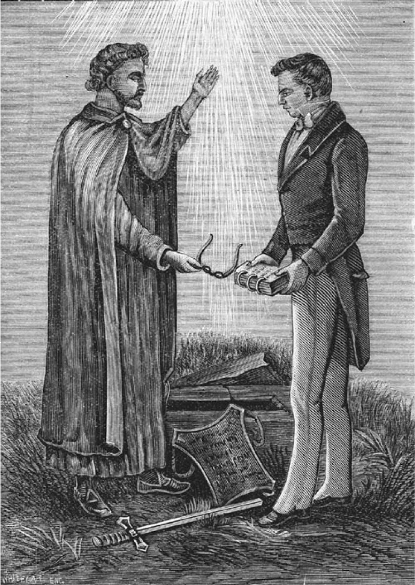
Joseph Smith receiving the golden plates

The Latter Day Saint movement is a religious movement within Christianity that arose during the Second Great Awakening in the early 19th century and that led to the set of doctrines, practices, and cultures called Mormonism, and to the existence of numerous Latter Day Saint churches. Its history is characterized by intense controversy and persecution in reaction to some of the movement's doctrines and practices and their relationship to mainstream Christianity (see Mormonism and Nicene Christianity).

The founder of the Latter Day Saint movement was Joseph Smith, who was raised in the burned-over district of Upstate New York. Smith stated that, in response to prayer, he saw God the Father and Jesus Christ, as well as angels and other visions. This eventually led him to a restoration of Christian doctrine that, he said, was lost after the early Christian apostles were killed. In addition, several early leaders made marked doctrinal and leadership contributions to the movement, including Oliver Cowdery, Sidney Rigdon, and Brigham Young. Modern-day revelation from God continues to be a principal belief of the Mormon faith.

Mormon history as an academic field is called Mormon studies.

== Movement's historical context ==
=== Second Great Awakening and the Charismatic Movement ===
The Latter Day Saint movement arose in the Palmyra and Manchester area of western New York, where its founder Joseph Smith was raised during a period of religious revival in the early 19th century called the Second Great Awakening, a Christian response to the secularism of the Age of Enlightenment which extended throughout the United States, particularly the frontier areas of the west.

A significant early event in this Second Great Awakening was the Cane Ridge Revival, a large camp meeting that took place in 1801 at Cane Ridge, Kentucky. Joseph Smith's father Joseph Smith Sr. said he had several visions or dreams, as had Smith's paternal and maternal grandfathers.

The people of western New York, like the rest of the United States at the time, were also influenced by folk religion. The fathers of both Joseph Smith and Oliver Cowdery were reported to have used divining rods, though not by those within the LDS church. Joseph Smith used seer stones, which he used after his claimed First Vision. People of the time used such rods and stones in various ways, including to locate underground water, to find lost items, to locate buried treasure or mineral mines, as part of religious or magic rituals, or to communicate with spirits or angels. Until about the 1830s, the use of such divining media, even as a profession, was thought by many, though not all, as "honorable and profitable employment". (Palmyra Herald, July 24, 1822)

Another related strand of religious thought that became important to the Latter Day Saint movement was the Restoration Movement, primarily influenced by Barton W. Stone (who participated in the Cane Ridge revival), and Alexander Campbell, who joined Stone in 1824 in Ohio. Stone and Campbell believed that the division among Christian sects had been caused by a Great Apostasy (or falling away) from the original teachings of Jesus, and that the correct principles of Christianity could be re-established by "restoring" practices described in the New Testament. The Restorationists also intended to eliminate sectarianism, arguing that there should be only one Christian church, which should be called the "Church of Christ."

While these restorationist ideas were circulating in the western frontier, the family of Joseph Smith was living in western New York, where they attended many of the local revivals. During this time, the area was seeing so many Christian revivals that western New York's most well-known revivalist Charles Grandison Finney later dubbed the area the "Burned-Over District". Because of a lack of clergy from established churches, this area was unusually open to religious innovations, new movements, and social experiments such as religious communism.

Latter Day Saints do not typically distinguish between this Restoration movement and the broader Protestant Reformation, since both were an attempt to return to the values and doctrines taught by Jesus and the Apostles, while most Latter Day Saint groups believe that there was a need for God to actively restore both authority and doctrine. However, in spite of their different use of the word restoration, this movement was an important part of the culture that led Joseph Smith to become interested in religion.

=== Masonic influences ===
Joseph Smith and several of the church founders were Freemasons, and were founding members of a lodge in Nauvoo, Illinois in March 1842. There are some similarities between Mormon temple worship and symbolism and the stories and symbols of Freemasonry. In modern times, The Church of Jesus Christ of Latter-day Saints (LDS Church) holds no position for or against the compatibility of Masonry with LDS Church doctrine.

== Leadership of Joseph Smith ==
=== Smith's First Vision ===
Most Latter Day Saints trace the beginnings of Mormonism to Joseph Smith's First Vision, which he said he had in about 1820 in the woods near his home. Early accounts of this vision describe it as a vision of Jesus in which he was told his sins were forgiven. Later, more detailed accounts indicate Smith was also told that all Christian denominations had become corrupt and further clarify that Smith saw multiple heavenly beings, including Jesus and God the Father.

=== Early visits by angels, Urim and Thummim, and the Book of Mormon ===
Smith also described many other visions involving angels. Some of his earliest visitations involved a Nephite prophet-warrior, who called himself Moroni. Smith said this angel appeared to him many times, and showed him where to find a set of buried golden plates containing ancient writings that the prophet-warrior had sealed in a stone box before his death, together with other artifacts. The writings on the golden plates, according to Smith, contained an account of the various nations that inhabited ancient America, and described how they were led to the New World by Jesus, but eventually lost their Christian faith through a series of wars and corruption.

After he said he received the golden plates, Smith began to dictate their translation to his wife Emma Hale Smith and various associates of his, including Martin Harris and, for most of the later translation, Oliver Cowdery. Smith said he translated the text through the gift and power of God and through the aid of the Urim and Thummim, or seer stone. The resulting writings were published in March 1830 as the Book of Mormon.

The Book of Mormon was much more ambitious than being just a purported history of Native Americans. Mormons quickly adopted the book as a work of scripture of similar importance to the Bible. The book's title page described it as an attempt to show Native Americans "what great things the Lord has done for their fathers", and to convince "Jew and Gentile that Jesus is the Christ, the Eternal God." (Book of Mormon, title page.) The book contained doctrinal discussions on numerous themes, including how the pride of the wealthy leads to the downfall of civilization, the dangers of "secret combinations" of people who meet secretly and use secret signs and oaths "to carry out the evil purposes of the group", and God's mercy and protection over his followers. Latter Day Saints consider the crowning moment of the book to be Jesus' visit to the ancient Americans, during which time he teaches them in person about the meaning of his death and resurrection.

=== Shared experiences by Joseph Smith and Oliver Cowdery, and restoration of the priesthood ===
Some of the early movement's most important charismatic experiences were shared between Joseph Smith and Oliver Cowdery, who joined the movement during the translation of the Book of Mormon. During the translation of the golden plates, Smith and Cowdery determined that they needed to obtain the Priesthood, or the authority to act in God's name, which they believed had been lost from the earth during the Great Apostasy. According to an account by Cowdery in 1834, they went into the woods near Harmony Township, Susquehanna County, Pennsylvania on May 15, 1829, were visited by an angel who gave them the "Holy Priesthood". (Messenger and Advocate, 1(1), Oct. 1, 1834.) In 1835, Smith and Cowdery stated that the angel was John the Baptist, and that the "Holy Priesthood" was specifically the Priesthood of Aaron", which included the power to baptize. Today this area is preserved as the Aaronic Priesthood Restoration Site.

Smith and Cowdery further elaborated for the 1835 publication of the Doctrine and Covenants that they were also later visited by Peter, James, and John, who restored the "keys of your ministry" and the "keys of the kingdom". Neither Smith nor Cowdery ever gave a date for this visitation.

=== Organization of the Church of Christ ===
Map of the eastern United States, showing locations important to the Latter Day Saint movement from 1830 to 1839

After the restoration of the Priesthood, Joseph Smith and Oliver Cowdery began baptizing dozens of people, as early as June 1829. (History of the Church 1:6, p. 59). These converts did not belong to a formal church organization. Nevertheless, this community of believers referred to themselves as "the Church of Christ", and included converts in three New York towns: Fayette, Manchester, and Colesville.

There is no known record of an early Mormon concept of the Lord's church prior to Smith's translation of the Book of Mormon from April to June 1829. Some time in April 1829, Smith dictated a story of Alma the Elder, the former priest of a wicked king, who baptized his followers by immersion, "having authority from the Almighty God", and called his community of believers the "church of God, or the church of Christ".

Some time between June and December 1829, Joseph Smith, David Whitmer and Oliver Cowdery said they received a revelation about "how he should build up his church & the manner thereof". This revelation was called the "Articles of the Church of Christ", and it indicated that the church should ordain priests and teachers "according to the gifts & callings of God unto men". The church was to meet regularly to partake of bread and wine. Cowdery was described as "an Apostle of Jesus Christ".

On April 6, 1830, Joseph Smith, Oliver Cowdery, and a group of approximately 50 believers met to formally organize the Church of Christ into a legal institution. By later accounts, this meeting was a charismatic event, in which members of the congregation had visions, prophesied, spoke in tongues, ecstatically shouted praises to the Lord, and fainted (Joseph Smith History, 1839 draft). Also, the church formally ordained a lay ministry. Smith and Cowdery, according to their 1831 account, were each ordained as "an apostle of Jesus Christ, an elder of the church". ("Articles and Covenants of the Church of Christ", Painesville Telegraph, April 19, 1831).

=== Movement in Ohio ===
The movement more than doubled in size with the conversion of Sidney Rigdon, a former Campbellite minister, who led several congregations of Restorationists in Ohio's Western Reserve area, causing hundreds of his adherents to follow him into Mormonism. A fiery orator, Rigdon was called to be Smith's spokesman, and immediately became one of the movement's leaders. By 1831 the church's headquarters were established in Kirtland, Ohio, and Smith urged the membership to gather there or to a second outpost of the church in Jackson County, Missouri (see below).

While based in Kirtland, the church changed its name to the "Church of the Latter Day Saints", and added a number of new doctrines and leadership offices. An attempt to establish a communitarian economy known as the "Law of Consecration" was established in 1831. The Latter Day Saint understanding of the priesthood was elaborated by the separation of the higher or Melchizedek Priesthood offices from the lesser or Aaronic Priesthood offices and by the restoration of the Patriarchal Priesthood. Also established were the First Presidency, the High Council—later elaborated as the High Council of Zion, the Travelling High Council (or Quorum of the Twelve) and Stake high councils—Seventies, patriarchs, high priests, and bishops.

During the Kirtland era, many charismatic experiences were reported, many involving visitations of angels or communication from God through stones. However, some Church members claimed to receive revelations that contradicted those received by Joseph Smith. He and several followers prayed about the issue, and Joseph recorded a series of revelations, which included a description of several real spiritual gifts, a statement that only Joseph Smith, as the Prophet, could receive new doctrines and commandments for the Church, and a warning that not all supernatural experiences come from God. This effort to balance charismatic experience with order and stability became a lasting characteristic of the Latter Day Saint Movement.

Kirtland also was the site of the construction of the movement's first temple. Latter Day Saints reported a great outpouring of spiritual experiences in connection with the Kirtland Temple's dedication. The temple was associated with the Kirtland-era "endowment", and with the temple ceremonies of "foot washing" and "solemn assembly." The movement also established the "School of the Prophets" which met in the temple. At Kirtland, Smith reported many revelations including the "Word of Wisdom"—advocating temperance and dietary restrictions. He acquired Egyptian papyrus scrolls which he said contained the writings of the Biblical patriarchs Abraham and Joseph. According to some reports, it was in Kirtland that Smith first began to practice the doctrine of plural marriage when he married Fanny Alger as his first plural wife in 1833.

In 1837 Smith and Rigdon founded an "anti-bank" called the Kirtland Safety Society. When it failed, some 300 of the Kirtland membership became disillusioned, including a third of the church leadership. The result was the movement's first major schism. A new organization led by Smith's former secretary, Warren Parish, along with Martin Harris and others, vied for control of the church in Kirtland. Re-establishing the original "Church of Christ" name, these "reformed Latter Day Saints" took possession of the temple and excommunicated Smith and Rigdon. Smith and Rigdon relocated to Missouri and were followed there by hundreds of loyalists in a trek known as the "Kirtland Camp."

=== Movement in Missouri ===
As the church was gathering to Kirtland, a second gathering place was established 900 miles distant, on the frontier in Jackson County, Missouri. Joseph Smith had revealed to Latter Day Saints that they were to prepare "the way of the Lord for his Second Coming", "for the time is soon at hand that I shall come...." (D & C 34:6,7) He also revealed that the "center place" of the City of Zion would be near the town of Independence in Jackson County. (D & C 57:3) Latter Day Saints began to settle the area to "build up" the City of Zion in 1831. Settlement was rapid and non-Mormon residents became alarmed that they might lose political control of the county to the Latter Day Saints. In October 1833, non-Mormon vigilantes succeeded in driving the Mormons from the county. Deprived of their homes and property, the Latter Day Saints temporarily settled in the area around Jackson County, especially in Clay County.

Years elapsed, and despite Mormon lawsuits and petitions, the non-Mormons in Jackson refused to allow the Mormons to return. Meanwhile, new converts to Mormonism continued to migrate to Missouri and settle in Clay County. In 1836, the Missouri legislature created Caldwell County specifically for Mormon settlement and Missouri branches of the church gathered there, centering on the town of Far West.

==== Church headquarters established in Far West ====
In 1838 Joseph Smith, Sidney Rigdon and their loyalists left the former church headquarters of Kirtland and relocated to Far West, Missouri. A brief leadership struggle left the former heads of the Missouri portion of the church excommunicated, such as David Whitmer, Oliver Cowdery, William Wines Phelps and others. Years later, many of this group of "dissenters" became part of the Whitmerite schism in the Latter Day Saint movement.

While the church was headquartered in Far West, Smith announced revelations that changed the name of the church to the "Church of Jesus Christ of Latter Day Saints" and initiated the "Law of Tithing." Conflicts with non-Mormon settlers arose as the church began to plant colonies in the counties surrounding Caldwell. These escalated into what has been called the 1838 Mormon War. The perceived militant attitude adopted by the church caused some leaders, including Thomas B. Marsh, president of the Quorum of the Twelve, to break with Smith and Rigdon. This precipitated another schism which led to the foundation of the Church of Jesus Christ, the Bride, the Lamb's Wife by George M. Hinkle, who had been the Mormon commander of the Caldwell County militia.

As a result of the war, 2,500 Missouri militia troops were called out to put down the Mormon "rebellion." Smith and other church leaders were imprisoned in Liberty, Missouri and the majority of the Latter Day Saints were deprived of their property and expelled from the state.

=== Movement in Illinois ===
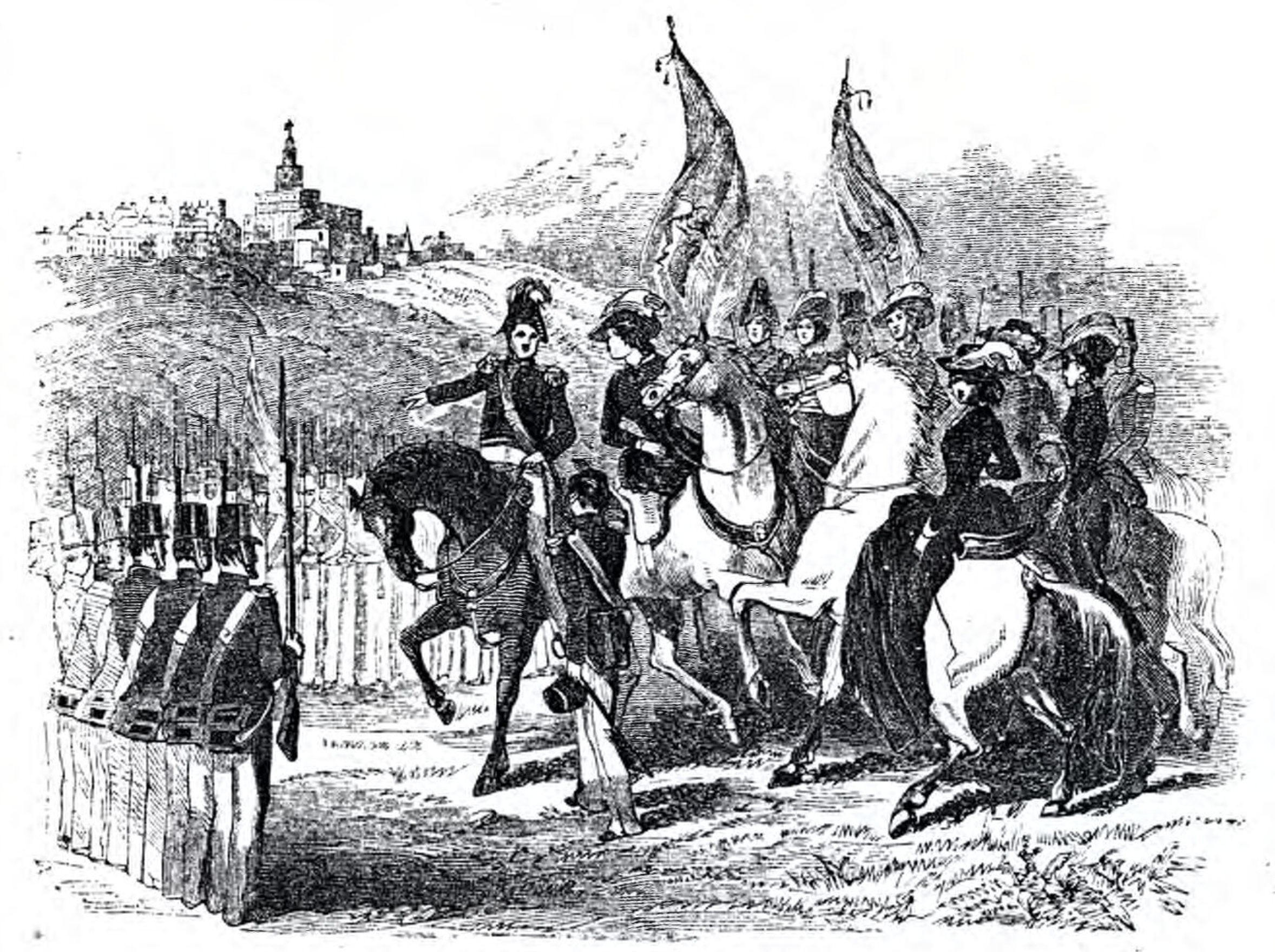
Smith inspecting the Nauvoo Legion

With the help of sympathetic non-Mormons in Illinois, in the spring of 1839 the Latter Day Saint refugees regrouped and began to establish a new headquarters in Nauvoo. Smith and other leaders were allowed after several months of harsh treatment to escape Missourian custody, and they rejoined the main body of the movement in April, 1839. In 1841, construction began on a new temple, significantly more elaborate than the one left behind in Kirtland. The Nauvoo city charter authorized independent municipal courts, the foundation of a university and the establishment of a militia unit known as the "Nauvoo Legion." These and other institutions gave the Latter Day Saints a considerable degree of autonomy.

Nauvoo saw the final flowering of Joseph Smith's vision for the movement, including some of Mormonism's more controversial practices. It was here that Smith introduced Baptism for the dead, Rebaptism, the Nauvoo-era Endowment, and the ordinance of the Second Anointing. In addition, he created a new inner council of the church—containing both men and women—called the Anointed Quorum. Although, according to some reports, Smith himself had been secretly practicing what he later called plural marriage for some time, in Nauvoo he began to teach other leaders the doctrine.

In March 1844, Smith was said by William Law to have organized a secret council of the church called the "Council of the Kingdom". Practices of this council included acclaiming Joseph Smith as "Prophet, Priest, and King" in addition to polygamy. These secrets were threatened to be released in a newspaper called the Nauvoo Expositor. Smith, acting in his capacity as mayor and head of the municipal court, responded by having the newspaper declared a "public nuisance" and by ordering the destruction of the press.

=== Death of Joseph Smith ===
Whenever Latter Day Saints gathered in large numbers, they met with opposition from neighbors who suspected that Mormon bloc-voting would lead to theocracy. By the mid-1840s, many non-Mormons in Hancock County felt threatened by growing Mormon political power, commercial rivalries, and a new religion with at least two elements that were hard to digest in the religious community of that time: first, Latter Day Saints had a somewhat different perspective on the nature of God from traditional Protestants; second, the claim of modern revelation, together with the claim of new scripture, opened the canon of the Bible.

Smith's destruction of the Expositor exacerbated all these fears and non-Mormons throughout Illinois began to clamor for his arrest. When Smith submitted to imprisonment in the county seat of Carthage, the Governor of Illinois, Thomas Ford, left the jail, taking the only impartial local militia unit with him. With the jail being guarded only by two guards and a unit of anti-Mormon militiamen, the Carthage Greys, a mob of disbanded militia units, attacked without resistance. Joseph and his brother Hyrum were killed.

All men who were tried for the murders were acquitted after the prosecuting attorney dismissed the testimonies of the state's witnesses suddenly in his closing remarks.

== Change in leadership ==
=== Succession Crisis of 1844 ===
In the months following Smith's murder, it was not immediately clear who would lead the church. His brother, Hyrum, who was Assistant President of the Church, (and as such would have been Smith's natural successor) had died with him. Another Smith brother who may have been a presumed successor should both Hyrum and Joseph die, Samuel, died a month later. Before Brigham Young could return to Nauvoo and stake his claim, another Smith brother, William was also considered as a potential successor. Other men who (by some reports) were designated as successors, including Book of Mormon witnesses David Whitmer and Oliver Cowdery, had been excommunicated from the church.

As a result, three of the principal claimants on the scene were:

- Sidney Rigdon, the only remaining member of the First Presidency—the church's highest executive council before his excommunication.
- The (Presiding) High Council of Nauvoo—the church's highest legislative and judicial council—led by William Marks.
- The Quorum of the Twelve Apostles—the council in charge of the church's missionary program—led by Brigham Young.

Smith's widow, Emma, wanted Marks to become church president, but Marks believed that Rigdon had the superior claim.

In a general meeting of the church at Nauvoo on August 8, 1844, Rigdon and Young presented their respective cases. As the only surviving member of the First Presidency (who had not officially apostatized), Rigdon argued that he should be made "guardian" of the church. Young argued that without Smith there, there was no presiding authority higher than the Twelve. Therefore, he proposed that the Quorum of the Twelve Apostles be constituted as the new presiding authority. A vote of the congregation overwhelmingly supported Young's proposal, said to have been caused by Brigham briefly yet miraculously having the "voice and countenance of Joseph Smith" during his talk. Soon after, Rigdon left Nauvoo and established his own church organization in Pittsburgh, Pennsylvania.

Rigdon, Young and Marks were later joined by a fourth claimant, James J. Strang of Voree, Wisconsin, who claimed that Smith had sent him a letter designating him as his successor. However, Strang had only recently joined the church, and lacked name-recognition among the rank-and-file Mormons in Nauvoo. Though he would manage to attract a sizable following, his assassination in 1856 all but extinguished his sect.

=== Further schisms and the "Mormon War in Illinois" ===
With Rigdon's flight, Young and most of the Twelve Apostles assumed control of church headquarters in Nauvoo. A conflict with Joseph Smith's last surviving brother, William, was a factor that led the remaining members of the Smith family to break with the Twelve. Many (though not all) initially followed Strang, though all later left Strang's organization and joined themselves to the nascent Reorganized Church of Jesus Christ of Latter Day Saints, which coalesced in the early 1860s around Joseph Smith's eldest son, Joseph Smith III.

Meanwhile, at Nauvoo, the conflict between Mormons and non-Mormons escalated into what is sometimes called the "Mormon War in Illinois." Latter Day Saints in outlying areas were driven from their homes and gathered to Nauvoo for protection. The Illinois state legislature voted to revoke Nauvoo's charter and the city began to operate extra-legally. At about this time, Nauvoo's population peaked; it may have had as many as 12,000 inhabitants (and several nearly as large suburbs), rivaling Chicago, Illinois, whose 1845 population was about 15,000, and its suburbs. However, by the end of 1845, it became clear that no peace was possible, and Young and the Twelve negotiated a truce so that the Latter Day Saints could prepare to abandon the city. The winter of 1845-46 saw the enormous preparations for the Mormon Exodus across the Great Plains.

=== Major divisions ===
The largest group of Latter Day Saints followed nine of the Twelve Apostles west, establishing a way station at Winter Quarters, Nebraska in 1846, and entering Salt Lake Valley in 1847. Having planted this initial colony in the Great Basin, Young returned to Winter Quarters and in December 1847 reorganized his faction of the church, establishing himself as the head of a new First Presidency. This reorganization led to additional schisms, including the break with Alpheus Cutler and what became the Church of Christ (Cutlerite) as well as Lyman Wight's group in Zodiac, Texas. Young's organization today, the LDS Church, is headquartered in Salt Lake City, Utah. (See History of the Church of Jesus Christ of Latter-day Saints.)

The bulk of Sidney Rigdon's church had dissolved by 1847, but some loyalists reorganized as The Church of Jesus Christ under the leadership of William Bickerton in 1862. James J. Strang's church in Voree suffered a significant schism in 1849, led by former follower Aaron Smith. After Strang's 1856 assassination, much of the remaining membership fell away from the Church of Jesus Christ of Latter Day Saints (Strangite), but a small following remained loyal. Other leaders, including David Whitmer, James Collin Brewster, James Emmett, Gladden Bishop, William Smith, and Charles B. Thompson also established church organizations that had limited followings.

Joseph Smith's family—including his widow, Emma Hale Smith, and her children—continued to live in Nauvoo after the departure of the majority of the Latter Day Saints. In 1860, the eldest of the Smith sons, Joseph Smith III, said he received a revelation to take his place as Prophet/President of a "New Organization" of the Latter Day Saint church. This group had gathered together many of the remnants of the various Midwestern Latter Day Saint groups into the Reorganized Church of Jesus Christ of Latter Day Saints, now called the Community of Christ. This has continued to be the second largest Latter Day Saint group, with headquarters on a portion of the original Temple Lot in Independence, Missouri.

Others remained unaffiliated, however, and in 1863 a group of Latter Day Saints from Illinois and Indiana united under the leadership of Granville Hedrick and reclaimed the name of the movement's original organization, the "Church of Christ." This group was the first group of Latter Day Saints to return to Independence, Missouri, to "redeem Zion." They are now headquartered on portion of the original Temple Lot there and are known as the Church of Christ (Temple Lot).

== The Latter Day Saint movement today ==
=== Denominations ===
==== The Church of Jesus Christ of Latter-day Saints ====
By far the largest of the sects, with membership in the millions, the LDS Church continues to be led by Brigham Young's successors. Young reorganized the First Presidency in 1847, and the First Presidency and the Quorum of the Twelve Apostles have continued the same succession pattern: when the Prophet dies, the senior Apostle becomes the head of the LDS Church. As of October 2025, Dallin H. Oaks is the church president. Among other things, the LDS Church has become known for its proselyting and humanitarian work worldwide.

==== Community of Christ ====
The Community of Christ, known as the Reorganized Church of Jesus Christ of Latter Day Saints (RLDS) until 2001, is the second largest group, with over 250,000 members. Joseph Smith's descendants continued to serve as Prophet and President until the retirement of Wallace B. Smith in the early twenty-first century. Today the church is led by President/Prophet Stephen M. Veazey, who is no relation to Joseph Smith. While the Community of Christ is somewhat more in line doctrinally with mainline Protestantism, they also believe in the Book of Mormon and an open scriptural canon, and place great emphasis upon peacemaking and similar pursuits. The Community of Christ has ordained women to priesthood since 1985 and dedicated a temple in Independence, Mo., in 1994.

==== Minor factions ====
Other notable minor factions of the Latter Day Saint movement include: the Church of Christ (Temple Lot), which owns the Temple Lot in Independence, Missouri; the Church of Jesus Christ (Cutlerite), founded by a member of Joseph Smith's Council of Fifty; the Church of Jesus Christ of Latter Day Saints (Strangite), founded by James J. Strang in 1844; the Church of Jesus Christ (Bickertonite), founded by a follower of Sidney Rigdon in the early 1860s (and now the third-largest Latter Day Saint denomination); the Church of Christ with the Elijah Message, founded in the 1940s by a man who claimed to be receiving revelations from John the Baptist; and the Restoration Branches, which broke with the Community of Christ in 1984 when the latter began ordaining women. In addition, several other Latter Day Saint factions continue to exist, some of which still practice polygamy.

=== Important beliefs ===
==== Jesus Christ ====
Latter Day Saints share a central belief in Jesus Christ as the Son of God and the Savior and Redeemer of the world. They accept his sacrifice as the only way to be saved. According to this movement's theology, that is the central message of the scriptures.

==== Revelation and scripture ====
Latter Day Saints generally share an open canon. While different sects believe in different revelations, a central theme of the Latter Day Saint movement is that God always has more to say to the church, because the church's situation is always changing.

Latter Day Saints believe in the Bible and other ancient scripture. However, the modern prophet is usually considered to be a more important source of revelation, because he receives contemporary (and, thus, more relevant) instructions from God.

==== Priesthood authority ====
Most Latter Day Saint sects believe that authority from Jesus Christ is necessary in order to baptize, give the gift of the Holy Ghost, or administer the Lord's Supper (or the sacrament). This Priesthood authority can be traced to the day that Joseph Smith and Oliver Cowdery received the Melchizedek Priesthood from Peter, James, and John, who received the Priesthood from Jesus himself.

==== Zion ====
Many of Joseph Smith's early revelations prophesied that the Latter Day Saints would build Zion, a new Jerusalem, a religious utopia centered in Jackson County, MO. The Prophet urged his followers to give everything they had to this cause. However, when they failed to live the Law of Consecration, which was a promise to voluntarily give all their property to the community for equal distribution, Joseph Smith received a revelation that God would build Zion later, when the people were ready. Both the Community of Christ and the LDS Church have come to understand Zion as primarily a community way of life that is centered around Jesus Christ, but many people still believe that, when they are ready, they will be able to build the literal city of Zion as well.

== See also ==
- Criticism of the Church of Jesus Christ of Latter-day Saints
- Folk magic and the Latter Day Saint movement
- Historians of the Latter Day Saint movement
- History of the Relief Society
- List of Latter Day Saint movement topics
- Mormonism and history
- Mormonism in the 19th century
  - Death in 19th-century Mormonism
- Mormonism in the 20th century
- Mormonism in the 21st century
- Origin of Latter Day Saint polygamy
- Restorationism
