= Ezra T. Benson =

American religious leader

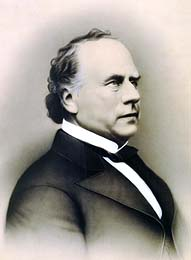

Quorum of the Twelve Apostles
- July 16, 1846 – September 3, 1869
- Called by: Brigham Young

LDS Church Apostle
- July 16, 1846 – September 3, 1869
- Called by: Brigham Young
- Reason: Removal of John E. Page from the Quorum of the Twelve Apostles
- Reorganization at end of term: Albert Carrington ordained

Personal details
- Born: Ezra Taft Benson; February 22, 1811; Mendon, Massachusetts, United States
- Died: September 3, 1869 (aged 58); Ogden, Utah Territory, United States
- Resting place: Logan City Cemetery; 41.7492°N 111.8061°W
- Spouse(s): 8
- Children: 35
- Parents: John Benson; Chloe Taft

Ezra Taft Benson (February 22, 1811 – September 3, 1869) (commonly referred to as Ezra T. Benson to distinguish him from his great-grandson of the same name) was an apostle and a member of the Quorum of the Twelve Apostles of the Church of Jesus Christ of Latter-day Saints (LDS Church).

== Early life ==
Benson was born in Mendon, Massachusetts on February 22, 1811, the son of John Benson and Chloe Taft. His father moved to a farm in Uxbridge, Massachusetts, in 1817 where he lived for at least 16 of the next 18 years. Benson married Pamelia Andrus of Northbridge on January 1, 1832, at Uxbridge. They lived at Uxbridge for the next three years, between 1832 and 1835. Benson also had lived in Northbridge, on his sister's farm in 1830 and 1831. He and Pamelia had children, one of whom died at Uxbridge in 1833. Benson managed the ‘Wilson hotel’ in the center of Uxbridge and made a considerable sum of money which he invested in a cotton mill at Holland, Massachusetts, He moved to Holland in 1835 and became postmaster, before moving West.

== Conversion to Mormonism and church leadership ==
After hearing Joseph Smith speak in a debate against a Dr. Nelson, Benson and his wife were baptized into the Church of Jesus Christ of Latter Day Saints on July 19, 1840, in Quincy, Illinois. He was then ordained an elder and high priest in 1840. He had moved to Quincy previously, and first met members of the church when they came there at the time they were driven out of Missouri. In 1841, Benson moved to Nauvoo. While in Nauvoo, Benson served as a night guard for the Nauvoo Temple during its construction.

Benson was ordained to the office of apostle on July 16, 1846. He replaced John E. Page in the Quorum of the Twelve.

Benson arrived in the Salt Lake Valley as one of the first 148 Mormon settlers with the vanguard company of 1847, also known as the Brigham Young Pioneer Company. The company left Winter Quarters, Nebraska, on April 16, 1847, and arrived in the Salt Lake Valley between July 21 and July 24, 1847.

== Missionary service ==
Benson served as a church missionary in the United States, Europe, and the Sandwich Islands. His first mission in the 1840s took him to his birthplace of Mendon, Massachusetts. On this journey he also preached in Chambersburg, Illinois. During his second mission, Benson was in New Jersey, serving with John Pack, when they received news of Joseph Smith's murder. From December 1844 to May 1845, Benson served a mission to New England, during which he served as president of the Boston Conference. He was in then charge of the church's missionary efforts in England until the fall of 1857. He went to the Sandwich Islands in 1864; the boat he was traveling on capsized, but Benson and the other missionaries lived.

== Political career ==
Benson served in the Utah Territorial Legislature as a Territorial Councilor for ten years.

== Family ==
Like many early Latter Day Saints, Benson practiced plural marriage. On April 27, 1844, Benson married his first plural wife, Adeline Brooks Andrus, the sister of Pamelia. After moving to Utah, Benson married Adeline Brooks Andrus, Desdemona Fullmer (a widow of Joseph Smith), Eliza Ann Perry, Lucinda West, Elizabeth Gollaher, Olive Mary Knight, and Mary Larsen. Benson had eight wives and 35 children. He also owned a few Paiute slaves.

In February, 1873, one of Benson's sons, Charles Augustus "Charlie" Benson, was lynched in Logan, Utah, after an altercation in which he likely shot and killed a man, then tried to escape.

Benson's great-grandson, also named Ezra Taft Benson, also became an apostle of the LDS Church; the younger Benson served as U.S. Secretary of Agriculture in the 1950s and president of the LDS Church from 1985 to 1994.

== Death and burial ==
Benson died suddenly from a heart attack on September 3, 1869, while in Ogden, Utah Territory. He was 58 years old. He is buried in the Logan City Cemetery in Logan, Utah.

== See also ==
- Taft family

The Church of Jesus Christ of Latter-day Saints titles
Preceded by Orson Pratt	Quorum of the Twelve Apostles; July 16, 1846–September 3, 1869	Succeeded by Charles C. Rich
