= Hazen Aldrich =

Leader of Latter Day Saint movement (1797–1873)

First Seven Presidents of the Seventy
- March 1, 1835 – April 6, 1837
- Called by: Joseph Smith
- End reason: Honorably released because he had already been ordained a high priest

Personal details
- Born: January 10, 1797; Lebanon, New Hampshire, United States
- Died: 1873; El Monte, California, United States
- Resting place: Savannah Memorial Park Cemetery; 34.0812°N 118.0678°W
- Spouse(s): Elizabeth Manchester
- Parents: Andrew Hazen Aldrich; Annis Sweetland

Hazen Aldrich (January 10, 1797 – 1873) was an early leader in the Latter Day Saint movement. After the death of Joseph Smith, Aldrich went on to lead a small denomination of Latter Day Saints known as the Brewsterites.

== Biography ==
Aldrich was born in Lebanon, New Hampshire to Andrew H. Aldrich and Annis Sweetland. In April or May 1832, Aldrich was taught about the Latter Day Saint movement by missionaries Orson Pratt and Lyman E. Johnson and was baptized in Bath, New Hampshire. Aldrich was baptized at the same time as future apostle and member of the First Presidency Amasa M. Lyman.

On July 4, 1832, Aldrich was given the Melchizedek priesthood and ordained to the office of elder by Pratt. On June 8, 1833, Pratt ordained him a high priest. In 1834, Aldrich participated in the Zion's Camp expedition to Missouri.

On February 28, 1835, Joseph Smith ordained Aldrich to the office of seventy and chose him as the presiding president of the newly organized First Quorum of Seventy. However, when it was discovered by Smith that Aldrich had previously been ordained a high priest, he asked Aldrich to stand down from his position and join the quorum of high priests. Aldrich did so on April 6, 1837, which left Joseph Young as the presiding president of the Seventy.

In 1836, Aldrich was the first Mormon missionary to preach in Lower Canada, in what today is the province of Quebec. Aldrich apostatized from the church in 1837 in Kirtland, Ohio.

=== Brewsterites ===
After the succession crisis, Aldrich joined the church led by James Strang. On December 16, 1846, Strang excommunicated Aldrich from the church for incest with his daughter, either Betsy or Louisa. In November 1847, Aldrich became a member of the Church of Christ (Whitmerite). After this denomination died, Aldrich and James C. Brewster created the Church of Christ (Brewsterite) in 1848. On September 29, 1849, Aldrich became the president of this Latter Day Saint denomination, and edited a Brewsterite periodical entitled the Olive Branch. In August 1850, Brewster led about 85 of his followers (including Hazen Aldrich's pregnant daughter, Betsy Aldrich Wilder and her family) from Independence, Missouri, to the edenic "Land of Bashan" that Brewster had seen in visions, lying at the confluence of the Gila and Colorado rivers, in the southwestern United States. Inadequate preparation and lack of supplies along the route led to dissension in the group. One dissenting family, the Oatmans, split from the main body of migrants, and were mostly slain by Yavapai Indians. Two surviving young girls were held in captivity several years, one eventually starving to death. Olive Oatman, however, survived and was eventually recovered from the Mohave tribe, who had gotten her from the Yavapai. Betsy and her husband were also dissenters from the group but made it safely to Los Angeles, California, where she divorced her husband in February 1853 and married Wesley Fielding Gibson and raised more children.

=== Death ===
Aldrich, who did not follow Brewster to Arizona, resigned his position as church president in January 1853, and emigrated to California to support his daughter Betsy through her divorce, and to live with his other daughter, Louisa Aldrich Geary and her family, in El Monte, Los Angeles, California. Aldrich died in El Monte in 1873, and was buried in Rosemead, California, at Savannah Memorial Park.
