= Herald House =

Publishing arm of Community of Christ

- Status: Active
- Founded: 1860; 166 years ago
- Country of origin: United States
- Headquarters location: Independence, Missouri
- Publication types: Books (print and digital)
- Nonfiction topics: Mormon scripture
- Imprints: Independence Press
- Owner: Community of Christ
- No. of employees: 78+
- Official website: www.heraldhouse.org

Herald House or Herald Publishing House is the publishing division of Community of Christ in Independence, Missouri. It publishes books, periodicals and other materials at the direction of the First Presidency. Its history dates to the publication of a church periodical called the True Latter Day Saints' Herald in Cincinnati, Ohio in 1860. The first church-owned press was located in Plano, Illinois and a much larger facility was opened in Lamoni, Iowa in 1881. The publishing plant in Lamoni was destroyed by fire in 1907. A replacement facility was built shortly thereafter. When the church headquarters moved to Independence, Missouri in 1921, the Herald House was relocated to a facility that had previously been used by an artillery battalion of the Missouri National Guard. In 1965, a modern publishing facility was built for Herald House 3225 South Noland Road in Independence. That facility was closed in 1999 and printing has been outsourced since that date. The publishing offices were moved to The Temple and The Auditorium in Independence, Missouri.

Herald House publishes the Herald, the monthly denominational magazine of the Community of Christ. The Herald is a member of the Associated Church Press from whom it has received awards and other recognition in recent years. Herald Publishing House is a non-profit 501(c)(3) and a public charity 509(a)(3). Books published by Herald House include scriptures, scripture studies, Christian education materials, worship resources, inspirational books, priesthood and leadership manuals, hymnals (including the official denominational hymnal, Community of Christ Sings), missionary materials, stewardship materials and theological studies.

Herald House also does business under the Independence Press publishing imprint.
