= Record of the Nephites =

Religious text

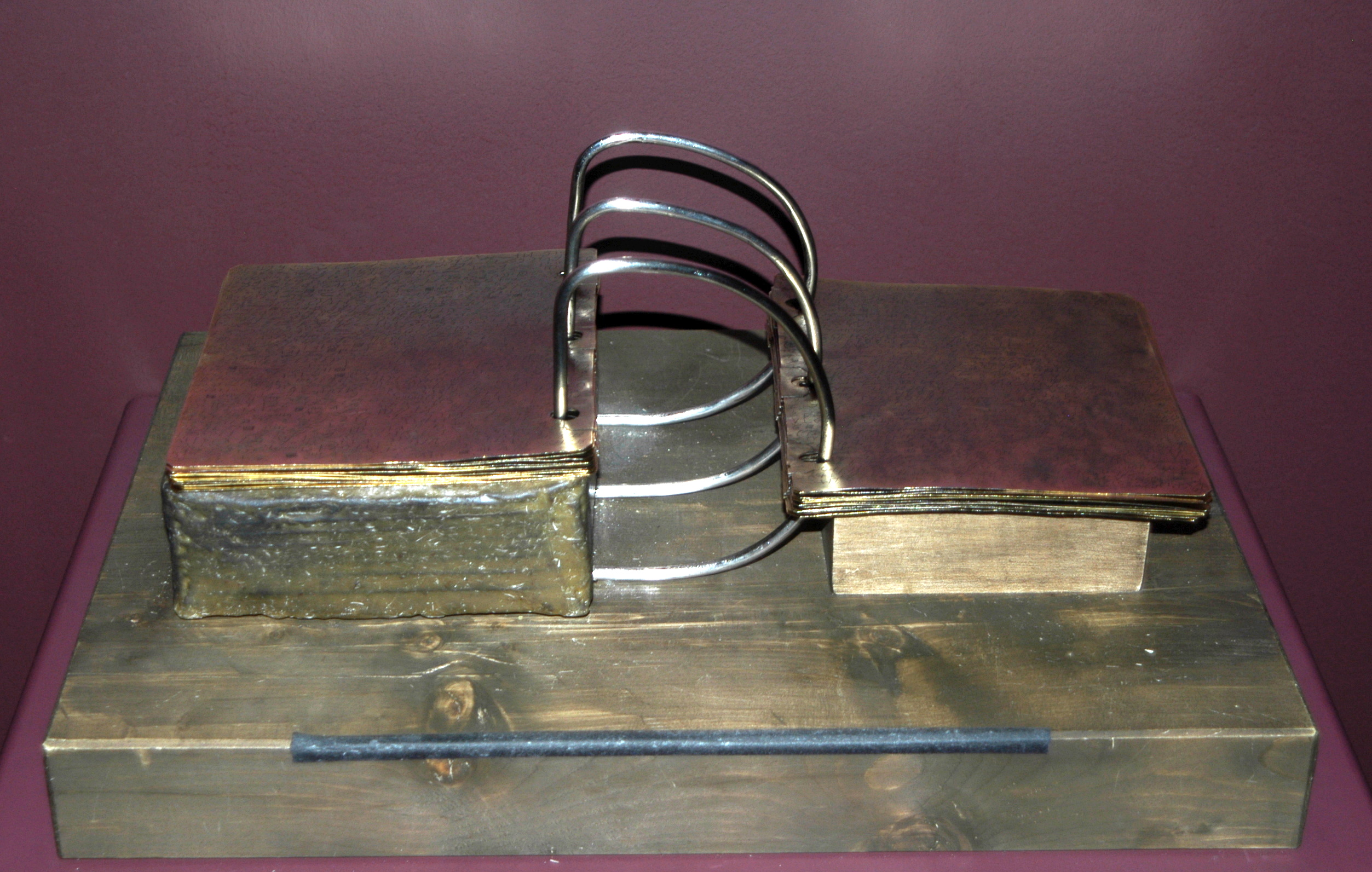
Full-scale model of the gold plates based on Joseph Smith's description

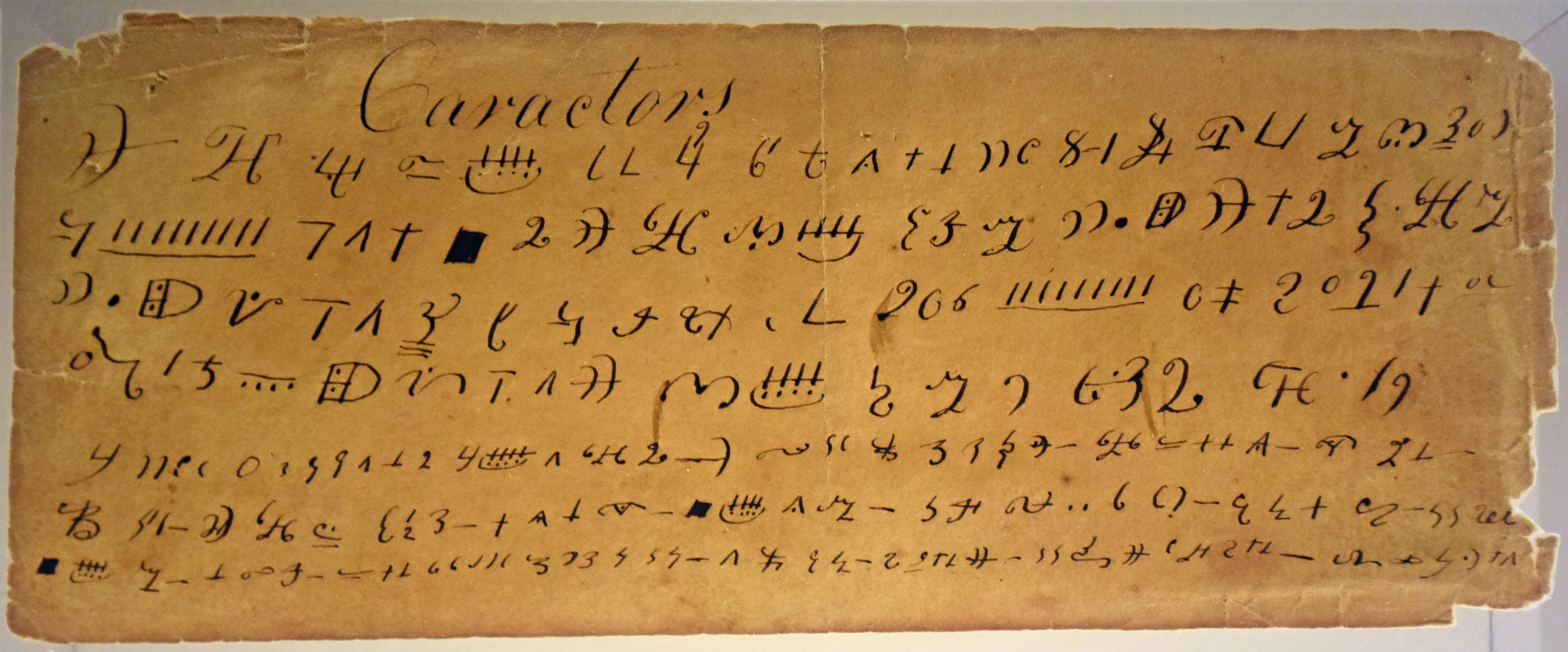
Photograph of what is believed by some to be the 1830 document known as the "Anthon Transcript"

Within the religions of the Latter-day Saint movement that developed in the U.S. during the early 1800s, the phrase record of the Nephites has two distinct but related usages. The primary use is to describe the collection of inscribed metal plates on which the Nephites purportedly recorded their history. An abridged version of this record, reportedly inscribed on gold plates, was the source of the Book of Mormon, according to Joseph Smith. The Record of the Nephites was also the manuscript title of the Book of Mormon. The Whitmerite branch of the Latter-Day Saint movement used The Record of the Nephites as the title for their version of the Book of Mormon.

== Inscribed plates ==
Beginning with Nephi, various people in the Book of Mormon were charged with keeping a record of the secular and sacred history of the Nephites. These records were inscribed on metal plates. The record keeper was usually a prophet, although there are some minor authors who were not. For some portion of the Book of Mormon history the records were kept by Nephite rulers, either kings or chief judges, many of whom were also prophets.

There were several sets of plates that constituted the record of the Nephites. Some of the plates are specifically mentioned in the Book of Mormon, including the brass plates of Laban, the history of the Jaredites, and the large and small plates of Nephi.

According to the Book of Mormon, Mormon, one of the last of the Nephites, abridged the record on the Golden Plates. Mormon states that he took his account primarily from the large plates of Nephi, but he also included the unabridged, small plates of Nephi.

Mormon's son, Moroni, added to Mormon's account but stated that he would have written more, "if I had room upon the plates, but I have not; and ore I have none" (Mormon 8:5). Moroni had been commanded by his father to seal the plates and "hide up the record in the earth" (Mormon 8:4). Adherents of Mormonism believe that Moroni, as an angel, appeared to Joseph Smith in 1823 and directed him to where the plates were hidden. According to Joseph Smith's account, this was the Hill Cumorah, near Palmyra, New York.

== Manuscript title ==
The Book of Mormon is sometimes published as The Record of the Nephites. It is also called The Nephite Record and The Stick of Joseph, depending on the publisher. The term Stick of Joseph is a reference to the verses in the King James Version of the Bible, Book of Ezekiel chapter 37, which the Latter Day Saint movement believes to be a prophecy of the Record of the Nephites.

Such titles may indicate that the text is from an unedited copy of the first edition, published 1830 by Egbert Grandin in Palmyra, New York.

Existing versions of the manuscript and first editions available for public perusal through archives such as The Joseph Smith Papers use the standard name the Book of Mormon.

== See also ==
- Golden Plates
- Lost 116 pages
