= John E. Page =

American Latter Day Saint leader (1799–1867)

Quorum of the Twelve Apostles
- December 19, 1838 – February 9, 1846
- Called by: Joseph Smith
- End reason: Disfellowshipment and removal from Quorum

Latter Day Saint Apostle
- December 19, 1838 – June 27, 1846
- Called by: Joseph Smith
- Reason: Replenishing the Quorum of the Twelve
- End reason: Excommunication for apostasy
- Reorganization at end of term: Ezra T. Benson ordained

Personal details
- Born: John Edward Page; February 25, 1799; Trenton, New York, United States
- Died: October 14, 1867 (aged 68); Sycamore, Illinois, United States

John Edward Page (February 25, 1799 – October 14, 1867) was an early leader in the Latter Day Saint movement.

Born in Trenton, New York, Page was the son of Ebenezer and Rachel Page. He was baptized into the Church of Christ on August 18, 1833, in Brownhelm, Ohio, by missionary Emer Harris. After his conversion, Page was ordained an elder on September 12, 1833. He married Lorain Stevens on December 26 of that year. The couple had two children, but both Stevens and the children later died. He remarried in 1839 to Mary Judd, with whom he had three sons. He relocated to Kirtland, Ohio, in 1835. Page served a mission in Upper Canada from 1836 to 1837. By his count, he baptized 600 persons. He also proselyted in the eastern United States from 1840 to 1842 and in Washington, D.C., in 1844.

Page was called as a member of the Quorum of the Twelve Apostles in July 1838. In 1838, he moved to Missouri, settling in Far West, Caldwell County. Page left personal accounts of attacks by mobs of Missouri residents, both while with the wagon train and while residing in Far West. He noted that he "buried one wife and two children as martyrs to our holy religion, since they died through extreme suffering for the want of the common comforts of life." Page received his ordination to the office of apostle in Far West on December 19, 1838, from Brigham Young and Heber C. Kimball. He was also a member of the Nauvoo Masonic Lodge.

Page and fellow apostle Orson Hyde were called to travel and preach in the Holy Land and dedicate the land for the return of the Jews. He and Hyde started on their mission, but Page had a change of heart and never left the United States. In June 1841, in Philadelphia, apostle George A. Smith sought him out and encouraged him to complete his preparations and sail with Hyde in two days time. Page refused to go. While in Philadelphia, Page became involved in a controversy with some of the Latter Day Saints there, which led to a directive from Assistant President of the Church Hyrum Smith instructing Page to return to church headquarters at Nauvoo, Illinois.

After the death of Joseph Smith in 1844, Page made a brief claim to the leadership of the church. The majority of the Latter Day Saints, under the direction of Brigham Young, rejected Page's claim, but retained him in his position with the Quorum of the Twelve Apostles. Page was then called to serve in the Council of Fifty in 1845 to help plan and facilitate the church's move to the Rocky Mountains. However, he was then removed from the Quorum of the Twelve on February 9, 1846. After urging the Latter Day Saints to follow James J. Strang as leader of the church, Page was excommunicated on June 26, 1846. Ezra T. Benson was called by Young to replace Page in the Quorum. After leaving the church, Page worked on the Strangite periodical Zion's Reveille as editor in 1847.

Although Page was an apostle under Joseph Smith and President of the Quorum of the Twelve under Strang, he eventually came to reject both leaders as "fallen prophets". He later became affiliated with the organization of James C. Brewster and Hazen Aldrich, and later that of Granville Hedrick. By 1855, he, William Marks, and others were holding their own worship services. He joined the Church of Christ (Hedrickites) in 1862 and was instrumental in helping the church obtain possession of the Temple Lot in Independence, Missouri.

Page died in on October 14, 1867, in Sycamore, Illinois, at the age of 68.

== Notes ==
Church of Jesus Christ of Latter Day Saints titles Later renamed: The Church of Jesus Christ of Latter-day Saints (1844)
Preceded by Lyman E. Johnson	Quorum of the Twelve Apostles; December 19, 1838 – June 27, 1846	Succeeded by John Taylor
