= Zenas H. Gurley Sr. =

Leader in the Latter Day Saint movement

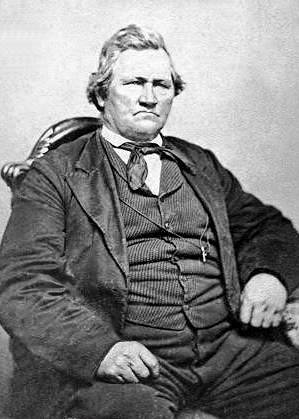

Council of Twelve Apostles
- 1853 – 1871
- Called by: Joseph Smith III

Personal details
- Born: Zenas Hovey Gurley; May 29, 1801
- Died: August 28, 1871 (aged 70)

Zenas Hovey Gurley Sr. (May 29, 1801 – August 28, 1871) was a leader in the history of the Latter Day Saint movement. He was baptized into the Church of Jesus Christ of Latter Day Saints on April 1, 1838, and became an elder soon thereafter. By the death of Joseph Smith in 1844, Gurley had been ordained a seventy.

Beginning in 1849, Gurley led a branch of the Church of Jesus Christ of Latter Day Saints (Strangite) in Yellowstone, Wisconsin, in the early years after the succession crisis. In 1852, Gurley broke with James Strang over the issue of plural marriage and was eventually excommunicated from Strang's church.

Along with Jason W. Briggs, Gurley became an important early leader of the "New Organization" of the church that developed in the Midwest in the 1850s. In 1853, he was called as an apostle in the New Organization, which is today known as the Community of Christ. Along with William Marks, Gurley ordained Joseph Smith III as President of the Church in 1860.

Gurley's son Zenas H. Gurley Jr. was called as an RLDS Church apostle in 1873.

Community of Christ titles
Preceded by —	Council of Twelve Apostles; 1853–1871	Succeeded by William H. Kelley
