= Herald (Community of Christ) =

Periodical of Community of Christ

Herald (formerly The True Latter Day Saints' Herald and The Saints' Herald) is the official periodical of Community of Christ. It is published bi-monthly in English in Independence, Missouri, by Herald House Publishing.

The True Latter Day Saints' Herald was first published in January 1860, at Cincinnati, Ohio, as the official newspaper of the newly organized Reorganized Church of Jesus Christ of Latter Day Saints (RLDS Church). Its editor was Isaac Sheen. In March 1863, publication moved to Plano, Illinois, and in November 1881 to Lamoni, Iowa. Since May 1921 the publication has been located in Independence, Missouri.

The Herald has had several name changes in its history:

- The True Latter Day Saints' Herald (1860–76)
- The Saints' Herald (1877–1953)
- Saints' Herald (1954–72)
- Saints Herald (1973–2000)
- Herald (2001–present)

== See also ==
- List of Latter Day Saint periodicals
- Ensign (LDS magazine)
