= Quorum of the Twelve =

Governing body in Latter Day Saint religious movement

In the Latter Day Saint movement, the Quorum of the Twelve (also known as the Council of the Twelve, the Quorum of the Twelve Apostles, Council of the Twelve Apostles, or the Twelve) is one of the governing bodies (or quorums) of the church hierarchy organized by the movement's founder Joseph Smith and patterned after the Apostles of Jesus (Commissioning of the Twelve Apostles). Members are called Apostles, with a special calling to be evangelistic ambassadors to the world.

The Twelve were designated to be a body of "traveling councillors" with jurisdiction outside areas where the church was formally organized (areas of the world outside of Zion or its outlying Stakes). The Twelve were designated as being equal in authority to the First Presidency, the Seventy, the standing presiding high council, and the High Councils of the various stakes.

After the death of Joseph Smith in 1844, permanent schisms formed in the movement, resulting in the formation of various churches, many of which retained some version of the Quorum of the Twelve.

== Members of the Quorum, prior to 1844 ==
In 1835, the Three Witnesses were asked by Smith to select the original twelve members of the church's Quorum of the Twelve. They announced their choices at a meeting on February 14, 1835. The Three Witnesses also ordained the twelve chosen men to the priesthood office of apostle by the laying on of hands, with the ordinations taking place in February through April 1835.

Below is a list of members of the Quorum prior to the succession crisis of 1844 (including those ordained after the original Twelve). A total of 18 different men were members of the Quorum during this period.

In 1838, four members of the Quorum were excommunicated and the President of the Quorum resigned. (President Marsh was-excommunicated in absentia in 1839). Of the five, two of them would later rejoin with Brigham Young and the Church of Jesus Christ of Latter-day Saints (LDS Church) after the 1844 schism, but they would never resume their former places in the Quorum. Two others would join various sects (with varying degrees as to the acceptance of their apostleship) and never returned to the LDS Church, while the fifth member left the Mormon movement completely. A sixth member of the Quorum was killed in 1838.

After the 1844 schism, ten of the then-Quorum members followed Young to the Salt Lake Valley. Two others left and joined other sects.

Name	Dates ordained	Post-succession crisis affiliations
Thomas B. Marsh	April 26, 1835	Excommunicated from the Church of Jesus Christ of Latter Day Saints in 1839. President of the Quorum from 1835 to 1839. Later rejoined with Brigham Young and the LDS Church in 1857, but did not resume his former place in the Quorum.
David W. Patten	February 15, 1835	Remained a member of the Quorum until he was killed in 1838.
Brigham Young	February 14, 1835	President of the Quorum beginning in 1839. Young became the 2nd President of the LDS Church in 1847.
Heber C. Kimball	February 14, 1835	Remained with the LDS Church and Brigham Young after 1844. In 1847, Kimball became First Counselor to Young.
Orson Hyde	February 15, 1835	Remained with the LDS Church and Brigham Young after 1844. In 1847, Hyde became President of the Quorum of the Twelve Apostles.
William E. McLellin	February 15, 1835	Excommunicated from the Church of Jesus Christ of Latter Day Saints in 1838. After 1844, McLellin joined for a short time multiple sects, including the Rigdonite, Strangite, Whitmerite and Hedrickite sects, each of which recognized his apostleship.
Parley P. Pratt	February 21, 1835	Remained with the LDS Church and Brigham Young after 1844 and continued within the Quorum until he was killed in 1857.
Luke Johnson	February 15, 1835	Excommunicated from the Church of Jesus Christ of Latter Day Saints in 1838. Later rejoined with Brigham Young and the LDS Church in 1846, but did not resume his former place in the Quorum.
William Smith	February 15, 1835	On May 24, 1845, Smith succeeded his late brother Hyrum Smith as the Presiding Patriarch of the church, but was disfellowshipped from the church and removed as both apostle and patriarch in 1845. Following 1845, Smith broke with the LDS Church and Brigham Young and held various positions in the Strangite sect and his own Williamite sect. Ultimately Smith joined with the Reorganized Church of Jesus Christ of Latter Day Saints (RLDS Church). While Smith believed that he was entitled to become the presiding patriarch or a member of the Council of Twelve Apostles of the RLDS Church, he did not resume his place in the quorum and remained a high priest for the remainder of his life.
Orson Pratt	April 26, 1835	Remained with the LDS Church and Brigham Young after 1844 and continued within the Quorum until his death in 1881.
John F. Boynton	February 15, 1835	Excommunicated from the Church of Jesus Christ of Latter Day Saints in 1838, joined with the short-lived Parrishites. After 1844, Boynton left Mormonism and never rejoined any Latter Day Saint sect.
Lyman E. Johnson	February 14, 1835	Withdrew from the Church of the Latter Day Saints in 1837 and was excommunicated in 1838. Johnson died in 1859, having never rejoined any Latter Day Saint sect.
John E. Page	December 19, 1838	After 1844, Page joined with the Strangite and Brewsterite. Page went on to be an apostle in the Church of Christ (Temple Lot) or "Hedrickite" church.
John Taylor	December 19, 1838	Remained with the LDS Church and Brigham Young after 1844. In 1880, Taylor became 3rd President of the LDS Church.
Wilford Woodruff	April 26, 1839	Remained with the LDS Church and Brigham Young after 1844. In 1889, Woodruff became 4th President of the LDS Church.
George A. Smith	April 26, 1839	Remained with the LDS Church and Brigham Young after 1844. In 1868, Smith became First Counselor to Young.
Willard Richards	April 14, 1840	Remained with the LDS Church and Brigham Young after 1844. In 1847, Richards became Second Counselor to Young.
Lyman Wight	April 8, 1841	Wight broke with all sects in 1844. He was ordained president of his own church, known as the Wightites. However, he later sided with the claims of William Smith and eventually of Joseph Smith III and the RLDS Church.
Amasa M. Lyman	August 1842	Remained with the LDS Church and Brigham Young from 1844 to 1870. Was stripped of apostleship on October 6, 1867 due to a sermon he preached in Dundee, Scotland, which all but denied the reality of and the necessity for the atonement of Jesus Christ. In 1869, while not admitting any conversion to the Church of Zion, known as the Godbeites, Lyman began a relationship with William S. Godbe and the Church of Zion. Lyman associated constantly, preached, and even openly participated in the Church of Zion. Due to Lyman's renewed activism and rumors that Lyman would even become president of the Church of Zion, Lyman was excommunicated from the LDS Church on May 12, 1870.

== LDS Church ==
In the LDS Church, the Quorum of the Twelve is officially referred to as the "Quorum of the Twelve Apostles" or "Council of the Twelve Apostles". The group normally has a leadership role in the church that is second only to the church's First Presidency. The Quorum implicitly follows the First Presidency's policies and pronouncements and its members are chosen by the First Presidency. However, when the First Presidency is dissolved—which occurs upon the death of the President of the Church—the Quorum of the Twelve Apostles becomes the church's governing body (led by the President of the Quorum of the Twelve Apostles) until they ordain a new President of the Church and he chooses counselors, which completes the reorganization of the First Presidency. Membership in the Quorum of the Twelve is typically a lifetime calling.

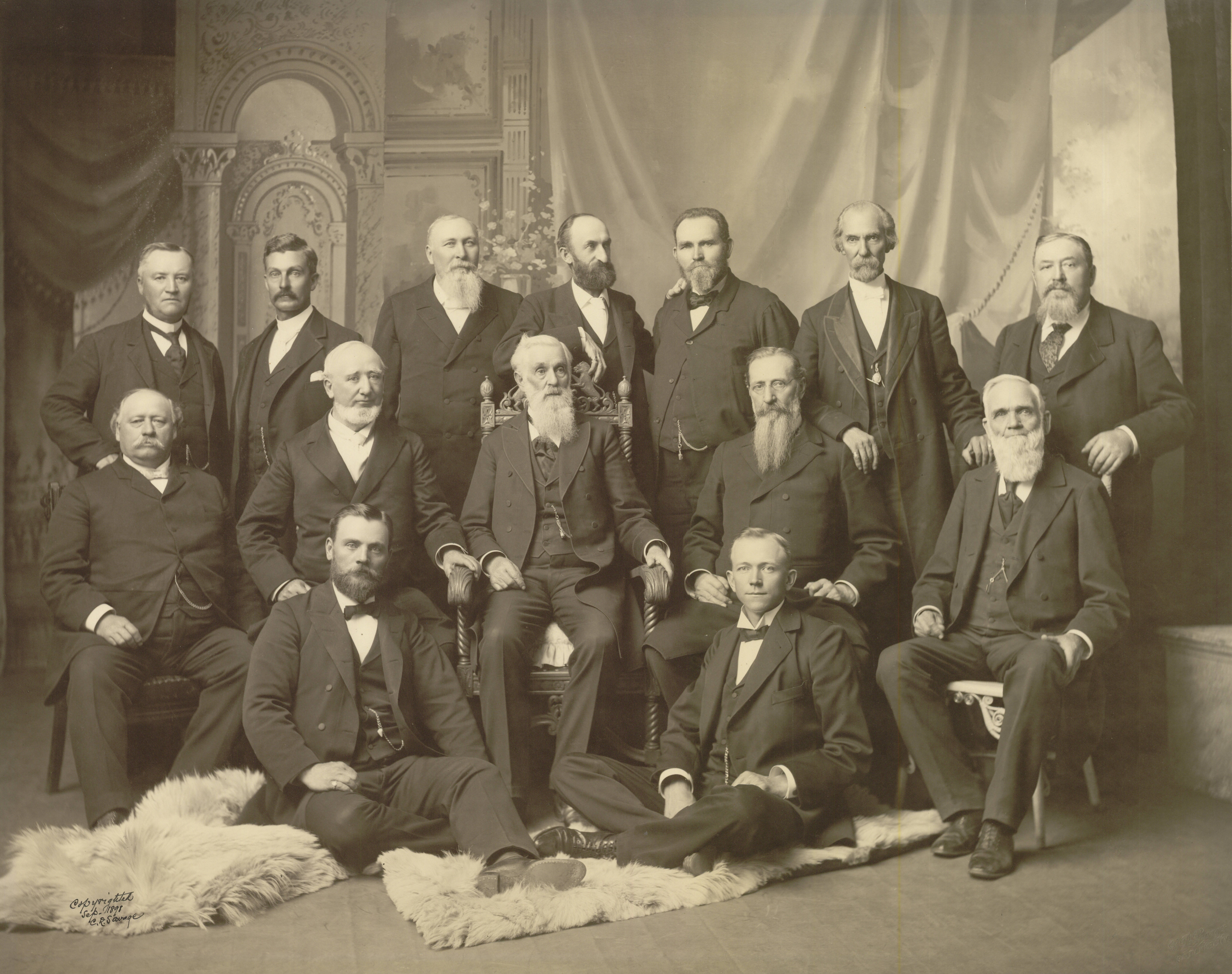
The First Presidency and the Quorum of the Twelve Apostles in September 1898

== Community of Christ ==
In the Community of Christ, the Council of Twelve Apostles is one of the governing bodies in the church hierarchy. They hold the priesthood office of apostle and are responsible for the evangelistic witness of the church. Apostles are also high priests in the Melchisedec priesthood of the church.

== The Church of Jesus Christ (Bickertonite) ==
The Church of Jesus Christ (Bickertonite) is the third largest denomination that resulted from the 1844 succession crisis.

At a conference in Green Oak, Pennsylvania, in July 1862, leaders of several branches in Pennsylvania, Ohio and Virginia came together and formally organized what they called "The Church of Jesus Christ". William Bickerton presided over the conference. Bickerton's two counselors in the newly organized First Presidency were George Barnes and Charles Brown who were ordained apostles. The members of the Quorum of the Twelve at that organization (ordered by seniority) were Arthur Bickerton, Thomas Bickerton, Alexander Bickerton, James Brown, Cummings Cherry, Benjamin Meadowcroft, Joseph Astin, Joseph Knox, William Cadman, James Nichols, John Neish and John Dixon. At the conference George Barnes reported receiving the "word of the Lord," which he related:

Hear the word of the Lord; Ye are my Sons and Daughters, and I have committed unto you the Keys of the Kingdom, therefore be ye faithful.

In this church, the "Quorum of Twelve Apostles" are the chief governing officers. Currently, the president of the church and his two counselors are not separated from the quorum, as the total number of apostles in the quorum is twelve, as specified in the scriptures. Apostles (and all ministers—commonly called "elders") in this church are volunteers and are not given any compensation for their ministry.

== Church of Christ (Temple Lot) ==
In the Church of Christ (Temple Lot) the Council of Twelve serves as the head of the church. The church seeks to strictly follow the church organization of the Bible and the Book of Mormon, and teaches that church offices added by Joseph Smith after publication of the Book of Commandments, such as a President of the Church and a First Presidency, were not consistent with the Bible and Book of Mormon, and therefore were not revelations from God (Sheldon 1999).

== Remnant Church of Jesus Christ of Latter Day Saints ==
The Remnant Church of Jesus Christ of Latter Day Saints has an Apostolic Quorum that is, as yet, incomplete by design. As the Remnant Church seeks to be a "renewal" of the Latter Day Saint movement resulting from the 1850s Reorganization, it is attempting to follow similar patterns of that prior reorganization. The First Presidency of the Remnant Church is not drawn from the apostles. Instead, the president of the church is chosen by Jewish Laws of Inheritance. The current members of the Quorum are: Don Burnett (President of the Quorum), Robert Murie Jr., Terry W. Patience, Roger Tracy, and Mark Deitrick.
