= William E. McLellin =

American Latter Day Saint leader

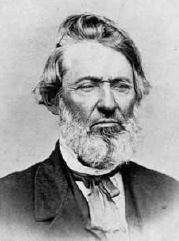

Quorum of the Twelve Apostles
- February 15, 1835 – May 11, 1838
- Called by: Three Witnesses
- End reason: Excommunicated for apostasy

Latter Day Saint Apostle
- February 15, 1835 – May 11, 1838
- Called by: Three Witnesses
- Reason: Initial organization of Quorum of the Twelve
- End reason: Excommunicated for apostasy
- Reorganization at end of term: No apostles immediately ordained

Personal details
- Born: William Earl McLellin; January 18, 1806; Smith County, Tennessee, United States
- Died: April 24, 1883 (aged 77); Independence, Missouri, United States
- Resting place: Woodlawn Cemetery; 39.086°N 94.411°W

William Earl McLellin (January 18, 1806 – April 24, 1883) was an early leader in the Latter Day Saint movement. One of the original members of the Quorum of the Twelve Apostles, McLellin later broke with church founder Joseph Smith.

== Biography ==
McLellin was born on January 18, 1806, in Smith County, Tennessee, to Charles and Sarah McLellin. His mother was a Cherokee. He married Cynthia Ann in 1829, but she died two years later in 1831. McLellin then married Emeline Miller in 1832 in Portage County, Ohio. They moved to Independence, Missouri that same year. McLellin and Miller were the parents of six children, four sons and two daughters.

=== Church service ===
In 1831, in Paris, Illinois, McLellin first had contact with the missionaries of the Church of Christ that Smith founded. He was baptized on August 20, 1831, by Hyrum Smith and was ordained an elder. During 1831, he traveled with Smith, and the two of them preached in Tennessee.

On October 25, 1831, McLellin was called through a revelation Smith said he received to serve a mission in the eastern United States with Samuel H. Smith, Joseph's brother. McLellin complained against the call and was instead tasked with traveling south with Luke Johnson in January 1832. McLellin was excommunicated for the first time in December of that year but was restored to full fellowship by 1833. That year, McLellin served a mission for the church, traveling with Parley P. Pratt to Missouri and Illinois. However, in a revelation given to Joseph Smith on March 8, 1833, it was said that the Lord was "not pleased with my servant William E. McLellin".

An experienced schoolteacher and a self-proclaimed physician, McLellin taught penmanship in the Kirtland School for Temporal Education in 1834. He was also the assistant teacher at the School of the Prophets. He served as a member of the church's high council in Clay County, Missouri, also in 1834, and was chosen and ordained to be one of the church's original twelve apostles on February 15, 1835, at age 29.

When the Book of Commandments was about to be published, some Latter Day Saints criticized the wording of some of the revelations Smith said he had received. According to Smith, the Lord issued a challenge to see if the wisest member of the church could write a revelation comparable to the least of Smith's revelations. If they could, then the members of the church would be justified in claiming that the revelations did not come from God. McLellin, who was trained as a schoolteacher, was selected by the critics for the challenge. According to Smith's history, McLellin failed to produce a credible text, and the controversy died away.

McLellin was appointed to be a captain in the Missouri State Militia in 1837.

=== Disassociation with the church ===
McLellin's association with the Latter Day Saint church came to an abrupt halt in 1838, when he declared that he had no confidence in the presidency of the church. This may have been due to the mismanagement of the church's financial institution, the Kirtland Safety Society. McLellin was excommunicated on May 11, 1838, and subsequently actively worked against the Latter Day Saints, becoming involved with Missouri mobs. According to members of the church, McLellin ransacked and robbed Smith's home and stable while Smith was being held in jail, pending charges on the Safety Society's financial problems. No charges were ever filed against Smith or against McLellin.

A history published in the Latter Day Saint periodical Millennial Star in 1864 related the incident:

While Joseph was in prison at Richmond, Mo., Mr. McLellin, who was a large and active man, went to the sheriff and asked for the privilege of flogging the Prophet; permission was granted, on condition that Joseph would fight. The sheriff made McLellin's earnest request known to Joseph, who consented to fight, if his irons were taken off. McLellin then refused to fight, unless he could have a club, to which Joseph was perfectly willing; but the sheriff would not allow them to fight on such unequal terms.

Previous to that incident, Smith authored a letter to the church from Liberty Jail on December 16, 1838, in which he made allusions to actions by McLellin that he vilified as sins. In that letter, Smith likened McLellin to the biblical magician Balaam whose ass refused to help Balaam curse the Israelites, in the era of Moses. The letter may have been what provoked McLellin to attempt to fist-fight Smith.

After Smith's death in 1844, McLellin first accepted the succession claims of Sidney Rigdon and was appointed one of the Twelve Apostles in Rigdon's organization on April 8, 1845. In 1847, at Kirtland, Ohio, he joined with several others to create a reorganization of the church, designated the Church of Christ. McLellin called on David Whitmer to assume the presidency, claiming that Whitmer had been ordained by Smith as his successor on July 8, 1834. This organization was short-lived. McLellin later associated with churches led by George M. Hinkle, James J. Strang, and Granville Hedrick.

By 1869, McLellin had broken completely with "all organized religion," though he expressed a firm belief in the Book of Mormon in 1880:

I have set to my seal that the Book of Mormon is a true, divine record and it will require more evidence than I have ever seen to ever shake me relative to its purity. […] When a man goes at the Book of M. he touches the apple of my eye. He fights against truth—against purity—against light—against the purist, or one of the truest, purist books on earth. […] Fight the wrongs of L.D.S.ism as much as you please, but let that unique, that inimitable book alone.

McLellin died on April 24, 1883, in Independence, Missouri.

== Personal writings ==
McLellin kept journals and notebooks during and after his time in the Latter Day Saint church. Because he was a prominent insider in the early church, these were of great interest to Latter Day Saint historians. In the early 1980s, collector Mark Hofmann claimed to have obtained the McLellin collection, which he described as embarrassing to the Church of Jesus Christ of Latter-day Saints (LDS Church). This generated interest that allowed Hofmann to sell it to two simultaneous buyers before being exposed as a counterfeiter when he killed two people to cover his crimes.

In the aftermath of these crimes, the LDS Church discovered McLellin's writings were already in the church's possession, having been acquired and forgotten in 1908. These were later published in two works, The Journals of William E. McLellin, 1831–1836, edited by Jan Shipps and John W. Welch in 1994, and The William E. McLellin Papers, 1854–1880, edited by Stan Larson and Samuel J. Passey in 2007. However, these collections were missing a notebook, known because of photographs in a 1920s newspaper published by the Reorganized Church of Jesus Christ of Latter Day Saints. In January 2009, this notebook was located and acquired by Brent Ashworth, one of the original collectors interested in Hofmann's supposed McLellin collection.

== Notes ==
Church of the Latter Day Saints titles Later renamed: Church of Jesus Christ of Latter Day Saints (1838)
Preceded by Orson Hyde	Quorum of the Twelve Apostles; February 15, 1835–May 11, 1838	Succeeded by Parley P. Pratt
