= James C. Brewster =

American religious leader

James Colin Brewster (October 26, 1826 – January 8, 1909) was a co-founder of The Church of Christ (Brewsterite), a schismatic sect in the Latter Day Saint movement.

Brewster was born in Black Rock, Erie County, New York to Zephaniah H. Brewster (born 1797) and Jane J. Higby Brewster (born 1809). His parents joined The Church of Jesus Christ of Latter-day Saints (Mormons) in the 1830s, and by 1835 they had moved to Kirtland, Ohio where the Latter-day Saints were gathering and building the Kirtland Temple.

In 1836, at the age of 10, Brewster began to claim that he had been visited by the Angel Moroni, the same angel that Joseph Smith Jr claimed had led him to the golden plates. In November 1837, due to his persistent claims of being a prophet, Brewster was disfellowshipped from The Church of Jesus Christ of Latter-day Saints.

By 1842, Brewster had finished a book entitled The Words of Righteousness to All Men, Written from One of the Books of Esdras, Which Was Written by the Five Ready Writers, In Forty Days, Which Was Spoken of by Esdras, in His Second Book, Fourteenth Chapter of the Apocrypha, Being one of the Books Which Was Lost, and Has Now Come Forth, by the Gift of God, In the Last Days. After the death of Joseph Smith in June 1844, Brewster began to accumulate followers in Springfield, Illinois, from Latter-day Saints who were searching for a new prophet-leader.

In 1848, Brewster and Hazen Aldrich founded the Church of Christ, which they claimed was the true successor to the Church of Christ that Smith had founded in 1830. Aldrich was selected as the sect's first president with Brewster and Jackson Goodale (1816–1896) as counselors in the First Presidency.

Brewster continued to receive revelation from God on behalf of the church, and in 1850 he declared that there was a land called "Bashan" in the Rio Grande Valley that God had selected as the new gathering place for the Latter-day Saints. In 1850, Brewster and Goodale led a wagon train of followers to find Bashan, while Aldrich—who had begun to doubt Brewster's prophetic abilities—remained behind in Kirtland.

On December 31, 1850, Brewster and 32 of his followers were listed in the 1850 United States census at Socorro, New Mexico Territory. His occupation was listed as "Mormon Prophet".

There were disagreements between Brewster and Goodale and among the other members of the church on the journey to Bashan, and most of Brewster's followers, including Olive Oatman and her family, deserted Brewster. Some survived the desert journey and drifted into Southern California and settled there; others returned home. Few publicly spoke about it.

Brewster returned with his family to Litchfield, Illinois, where he taught school. He joined the Union Army at Springfield, Illinois and was wounded in battle. In poor health, he then joined the Invalid Corps and worked at a hospital. During the Reconstruction Era, he followed his brother, Orlando Hamlet Brewster, to Louisiana, where James taught at a school for African Americans in Ouachita Parish and attempted to farm with them. Orlando had a role in the disputed presidential election of Rutherford B. Hayes and both Brewster brothers left Louisiana. Brewster then headed back initially to Illinois. He found odd jobs such working as a "hack driver" in Minnesota. His health was poor, actually due to tuberculosis, and was forced to find jobs as an orderly or "office boy." He said he was unable to do manual labor. He applied for a federal disability pension in 1880 and eventually was admitted to the National Home for Disabled Volunteer Soldiers Northwestern Branch, at Wauwatosa, Wisconsin, where he died at the age of 82 years. He is buried at Wood National Cemetery in Milwaukee, as "Pvt Jas Brewster, CO K, 22 ILL, INF."

The Soldiers Home record has him listed as a Protestant. No further prophecy from him is known in the six decades of anonymity following the collapse of his ministry in the New Mexico desert in 1851.
