= Church of Christ (Whitmerite) =

American religious movement

The Church of Christ, informally referred to as the Church of Christ (Whitmerite), was founded by David Whitmer, one of the Three Witnesses to the Book of Mormon's Golden Plates, who had been excommunicated from the Church of Jesus Christ of Latter-day Saints.

There were actually two separate organizations of this church. In 1847, William E. McLellin, who led a congregation of Latter-day Saints in Kirtland, Ohio, remembered that Joseph Smith, the movement's deceased founder, had designated David Whitmer as his successor. McLellin encouraged Whitmer to come forward and lead his church. Whitmer agreed and gathered others to his cause, including fellow Book of Mormon witnesses Oliver Cowdery, Martin Harris, Hiram Page and John Whitmer.

Taking the original name of the church, the Church of Christ published a periodical from Kirtland called, The Ensign of Liberty. Whitmer, however, never joined the main body of his followers in Kirtland and the church dissolved.

However, by the 1870s Whitmer was active again and had reorganized his Church of Christ. In 1887 he published his "An Address to All Believers in Christ" which promoted his church and affirmed his testimony of the Book of Mormon.

Whitmer died in 1888, but the Whitmerite church continued on. The church published a periodical called The Return beginning in 1889, which became known as The Messenger of Truth in 1900. The church published its own edition of the Book of Mormon under the name, The Nephite Record and published a new edition of the Book of Commandments. By 1925, most remaining members of the Whitmerite church had united with the Church of Christ (Temple Lot). The last of the Whitmerites was John C. Whitmer's daughter Mayme Janetta Whitmer Koontz, who died in 1961.

== See also ==
- Church of Christ (Brewsterite)
