= Church of Jesus Christ (Drewite) =

- Classification: Latter Day Saint
- Polity: Hierarchical
- Founder: Theron Drew
- Origin: 1965
- Separated from: Church of Jesus Christ of Latter Day Saints (Strangite)
- Congregations: 1

The Church of Jesus Christ is a schismatic organization in the Latter Day Saint movement which was organized in 1965 as a fracturing from the Church of Jesus Christ of Latter Day Saints (Strangite).

In the early 1950s, Theron Drew, a member of the Strangite church, met Merl Kilgore, who at the time was the leader of another Latter Day Saint group called Zion's Order of the Sons of Levi. Drew was convinced that Kilgore was the "One Mighty and Strong" prophesied in Mormon scripture and that Kilgore should become the successor of James Strang, to lead the Strangite Church. However, not long after promoting Kilgore, Drew changed his mind.

When Drew met again with the Strangite Church, he was rejected and excommunicated by them in 1965. Drew, his family, and a small number of supporters then organized The Church of Jesus Christ, claiming it to be the true successor of Joseph Smith's Church of Christ. The Drewite Church met in a farmhouse previously owned by Wingfield W. Watson, an early leader within the Strangites. Theron Drew died in 1978 and leadership of the church passed to his son, Richard Drew.

The Strangite Church sued The Church of Jesus Christ to recover some documents in Theron Drew's possession, but the lawsuit was unsuccessful.
