= Letter of appointment =

Letter of appointment may refer to:

- Letter of appointment (Mormonism)
- Letters patent
