= Voree plates =

Set of three metal plates associated with Mormonism

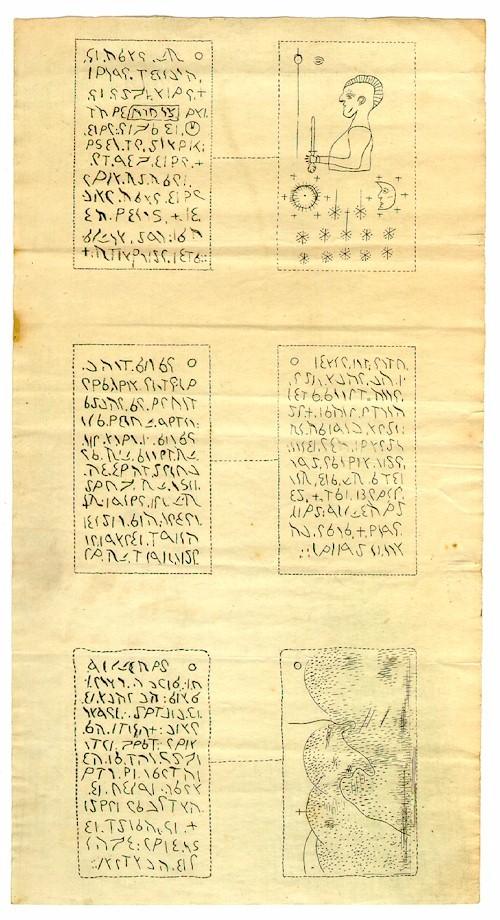
1845 broadside depicting the Voree plates

The Voree plates, also called The Record of Rajah Manchou of Vorito, or the Voree Record, were a set of three tiny metal plates allegedly discovered by James Strang, a leader of the Latter Day Saint movement, in Voree, Wisconsin, United States, in 1845.

Purportedly the final testament of an ancient American ruler named "Rajah Manchou of Vorito", Strang asserted that this discovery vindicated his claims to be the true successor of Joseph Smith, founder of the Latter Day Saint movement—as opposed to Brigham Young, whom most Latter Day Saints accepted as Smith's successor in 1844. The plates also lent credence to Strang's claim that Voree, not the Salt Lake Valley, was to be the new "gathering place" of the Latter Day Saints. His purported translation of this text is accepted as scripture by his church and some other bodies descending from it, but not by any other Latter Day Saint organization.

Unlike the golden plates used by Smith to produce the Book of Mormon, the existence of Strang's plates was verified by independent, non-Mormon witnesses, including Christopher Latham Sholes, inventor of the first practical typewriter. Strang was accused of having fabricated the plates from a brass tea kettle, a claim which he and his partisans vigorously denied. The plates disappeared around 1900 and their current whereabouts are unknown.

== Discovery ==
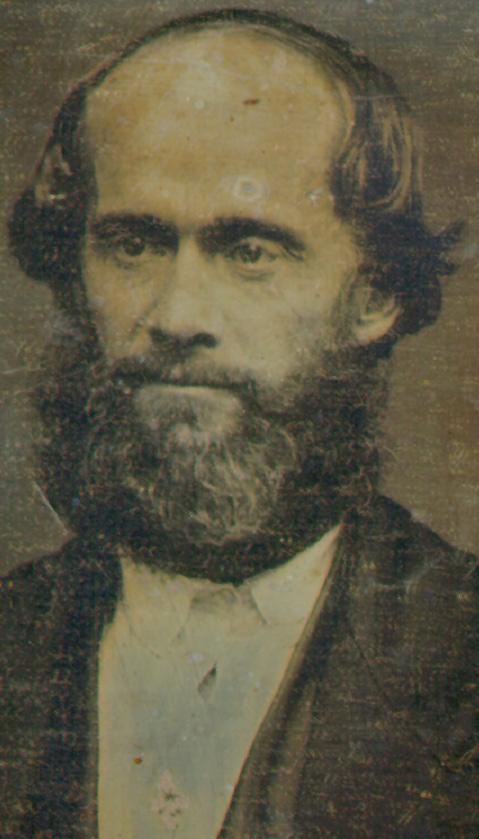
1856 daguerreotype of James Strang, taken on Beaver Island, Lake Michigan, by J. Atkyn, itinerant photographer and later one of Strang's assassins.

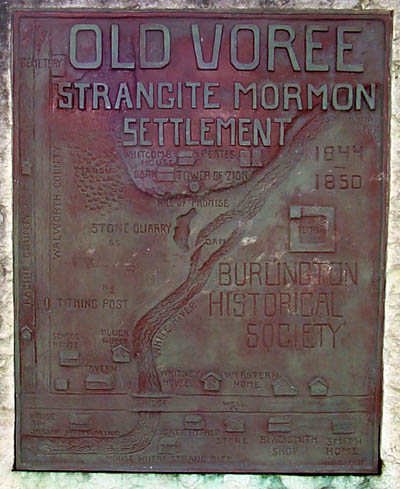
A map of old Voree, engraved on a monument at the townsite.

According to Latter Day Saint beliefs, many ancient inhabitants of the Americas engraved records on metal plates. Joseph Smith, the movement's founding prophet, claimed that he translated the Book of Mormon from a set of golden plates which he was shown the location of by an angel named Moroni.

Following Smith's murder in 1844, a number of claimants came forward to lead his nascent church, including Strang. As a recent convert to Mormonism, Strang did not possess the name recognition among rank-and-file Latter Day Saints enjoyed by Brigham Young and Sidney Rigdon, the two principal contenders for church leadership. Hence, Strang faced an uphill battle in his quest to be recognized as the heir to Smith's prophetic mantle.

To advance his cause, Strang asserted that unlike Rigdon and Young, he had hard evidence of his prophetic calling. One of Smith's titles had been "Prophet, Seer, Revelator, and Translator", and Strang wished to substantiate his claim to succession by following in Smith's footsteps. So, while Young and Rigdon never offered their followers any newly revealed ancient records, Strang announced on January 17, 1845, that God had promised to lead him to a hitherto-undiscovered chronicle of a long-lost American people. This, said Strang, would prove that he was Smith's true successor.

Strang next testified that on September 1, 1845, an angel of God appeared to him and showed him the location of "the record of my people in whose possession thou dwellest." Accordingly, he went on September 13 to the indicated site, located in Voree, Wisconsin, south of the White River on what is now referred to as the "Hill of Promise." Strang led four witnesses to a large oak on the hillside, inviting them to examine the ground around the tree carefully before digging for the plates. All four later testified that they could discern no evidence of digging or other disturbance of the ground.

After removing the tree, Strang's companions dug down approximately three feet, where they discovered three small brass plates in a case of baked clay. Strang subsequently claimed to have deciphered this record, which he said was authored by an ancient Native American named "Rajah Manchou of Vorito."

== Appearance and dimensions ==
The Voree plates measured approximately 2.5 inches long, and between 1.25 and 1.5 inches wide. According to one anonymous witness, they were "about the thickness of a piece of tin, fastened together in one corner by a ring passing through them." A second witness described them as being "thickly covered with ancient characters of curious workmanship." Stephen Post, the brother of Strangite apostle Warren Post, visited Strang in 1850 and examined the plates for himself, noting that "they were not polished very smooth before engraving, by appearance."

Unlike his brother, Stephen Post had trouble believing Strang's account of the plates' origin and discovery: "With all the faith & confidence that I could exercise," he later wrote, "all that I could realize was that Strang made the plates himself, or at least that it was possible that he made them." Post equally observed that the brass used in the Voree plates seemed indistinguishable to him from the French brass used in ordinary tea kettles.

Four of the six sides of the Voree plates contained text written in an unknown script. The fifth side contained a map showing the area where the plates were found, while side one contained engravings of the "all-seeing eye" and a man holding a scepter, with the sun, moon, and stars beneath him. These images were said to represent God, the president of the church, his two counselors, the high council of the church, the apostles, and the seventies.

== Translation and testimony ==
Strang's published translation of the Voree plates reads as follows:

My people are no more. The mighty are fallen, and the young slain in battle. Their bones bleached on the plain by the noonday shadow. The houses are leveled to the dust, and in the moat are the walls. They shall be inhabited.

I have in the burial served them, and their bones in the Death-shade, towards the sun's rising, are covered. They sleep with the mighty dead, and they rest with their fathers. They have fallen in transgression and are not, but the elect and faithful there shall dwell.

The word hath revealed it. God hath sworn to give an inheritance to his people where transgressors perished. The word of God came to me while I mourned in the Death-shade, saying, I will avenge me on the destroyer. He shall be driven out. Other strangers shall inhabit thy land. I an ensign there will set up. The escaped of my people there shall dwell when the flock disown the Shepherd and build not on the Rock.

The forerunner men shall kill, but a mighty prophet there shall dwell. I will be his strength, and he shall bring forth thy record. Record my words, and bury it in the Hill of Promise.

Strang published facsimiles of the Voree plates, and his translations of them, in his church's newspaper, The Voree Herald. Many Latter Day Saints found this new discovery compelling and believed it to be a sure sign that Strang was indeed Smith's true successor. For those who remained skeptical or merely curious, Mormon or non-Mormon, Strang readily produced the plates themselves for personal examination.

One such investigator was the non-Mormon Christopher Sholes, inventor of the first practical typewriter, and a later inspiration to Thomas Edison. As the editor of the Southport Telegraph, Sholes called upon Strang and perused his discovery. Sholes offered no opinion on the plates, but described Strang as "honest and earnest" and opined that his followers ranked "among the most honest and intelligent men in the neighborhood."

The Church of Jesus Christ of Latter-day Saints and the Community of Christ, the two largest factions of the Latter Day Saint movement, both reject Strang's claims to prophetic leadership and the purported authenticity of the Voree plates.

== Possible additional text ==
According to one source, there may have been text translated from the Voree plates that Strang never made public. Strang himself had indicated more than once that he had released to his followers only "part of the record of Rajah Manchou of Vorito." H. V. Reed, who had visited Strang and read his translation, published a possible addition to Strang's text in the Chicago Illustrated Journal in January 1873:

It shall come to pass in the latter days, that my people shall hear my voice, and the truth shall speak from the earth, and my people shall hear, and shall come and build the Temple of the Lord. My prophet, unto whom I send my word, shall lead them, and guide them in the ways of peace and salvation. In Voree the name of the Mighty One shall be heard, and the nations shall obey my law, and hear the words of my servant, whom I shall raise up unto them in the latter days.

No official determination has been made by the Strangite church as to whether these words should be considered part of Strang's translation or not.

== Allegations of forgery ==
Some members of competing restoration churches have insisted that the Voree plates were forged by Strang. Isaac Scott, an ex-Strangite, wrote to Joseph Smith III alleging that he learned from Caleb Barnes, Strang's former law partner, that he and Strang had fabricated the plates from a tea kettle belonging to Strang's father-in-law as part of a land speculation scheme.

According to Scott, Barnes and Strang "made the 'plates' out of Ben [Perce]'s old kettle and engraved them with an old saw file, and ... when completed they put acid on them to corrode them and give them an ancient appearance; and that to deposit them under the tree, where they were found, they took a large auger ... which Ben [Perce] owned, put a fork handle on the auger and with it bored a long slanting hole under a tree on 'The Hill of Promise,' as they called it, laying the earth in a trail on a cloth as taken out, then put the 'plates' in, tamping in all the earth again, leaving no trace of their work visible.”

Wingfield W. Watson, a high priest in the Strangite sect who knew Strang, vigorously challenged these allegations in an 1889 publication entitled The Prophetic Controversy #3. Among other things, Watson points out that the theory advanced fails to explain how the 12"x12"x3" stone covering block was placed above the case containing the plates.

Strang was assassinated in 1856. The Voree plates remained with his family until they disappeared sometime around 1900. Their current whereabouts are unknown.

== Script used on the plates ==
The Voree plates are written in an unknown alphabet. Strang authored a personal diary during his youth, parts of which were written in a secret code which was not deciphered until over one hundred years later by his grandson. Comparison of the script used in the coded portions of Strang's diary and the script used on the Voree plates shows remarkable similarities between the two.

Keith Thompson alleges that the text on the plates matches Strang's published translation. Although he did not identify the values of specific characters, he claimed to have shown how words such as "and", "in", and "are" appear in multiple places. According to a Strangite website, Derek J. Masson, a non-Mormon scholar, reportedly argued in an unpublished 1977 paper that Strang's translation was sound. This same site alleges that a second scholar, Robert B. Madison, concluded in 1990 that the text on the plates appears to represent a genuine, albeit unknown, language, and that Strang's translation appeared to be "a superb (if poetic) rendition of that text into English."

Independent scholarly assessment of Masson's and Madison's conclusions does not exist.

== See also ==
- Reformed Egyptian
- List of plates in Mormonism
