= Letter of appointment (Mormonism) =

Document

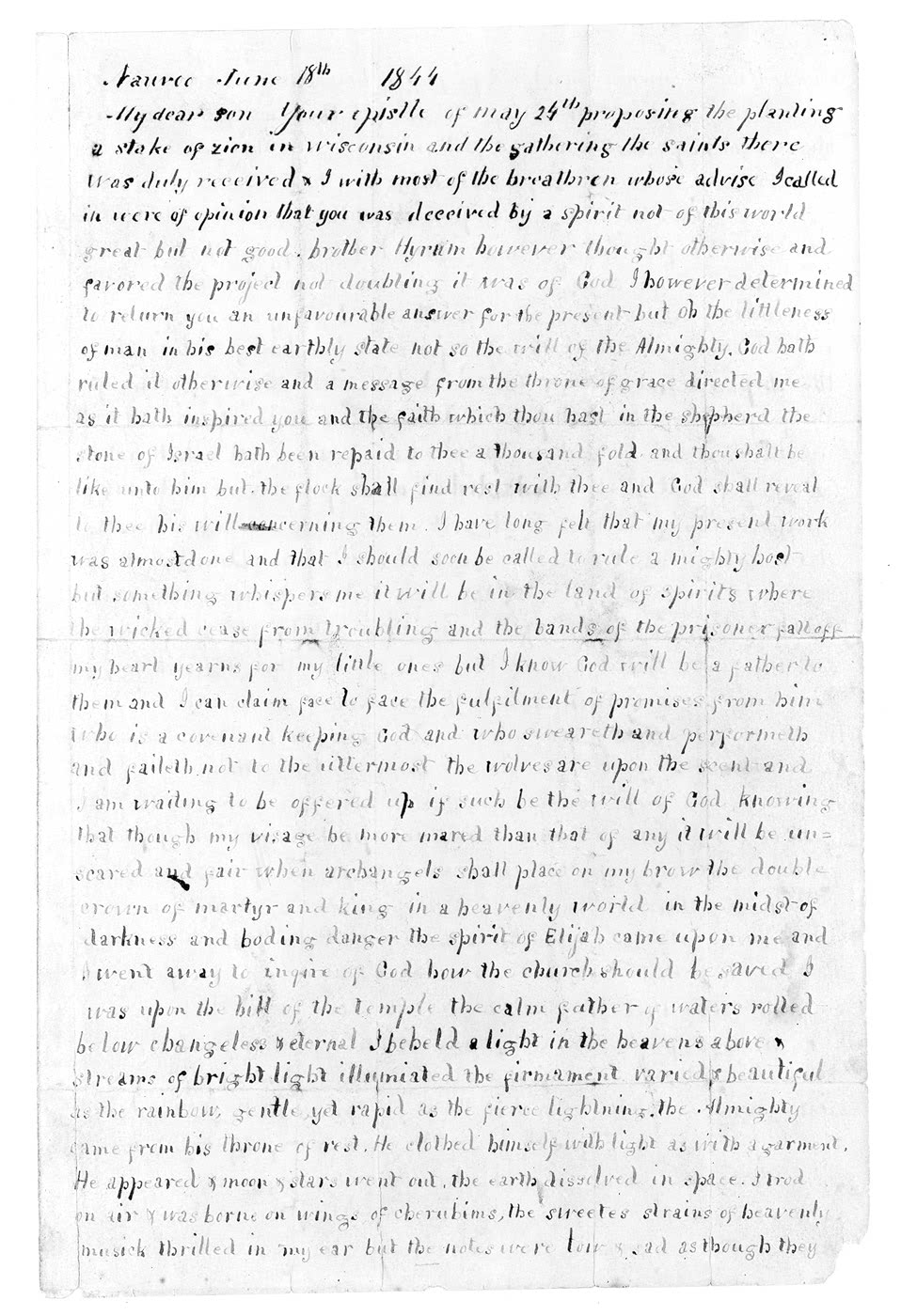
Page one of Strang's "Letter of Appointment."

The "letter of appointment" is a controversial three-page document used by James J. Strang and his adherents to prove that he was the designated successor to Joseph Smith as the prophet and president of the Church of Jesus Christ of Latter Day Saints. It formed part of a four-tiered argument for succession, being that according to various passages in Doctrine and Covenants, a prophet successor had to be A) appointed by Joseph Smith, B) ordained by angels, C) receive revelations as Smith did and D) translate ancient records certified by witnesses. Sent from Nauvoo, Illinois on June 19, 1844, to Strang in Burlington, Wisconsin, this letter was highly influential at gathering support for Strang's claim to succession until his death. Following Strang's murder in 1856, the letter passed through various hands until acquired by Yale University, where it currently forms a part of its Beinecke Rare Book and Manuscript Library. (Note: The James Jesse Strang Collection in the Beinecke Library is coded WA MSS 447. A complete description of this collection may be viewed at Strang Collection.)

== James J. Strang ==
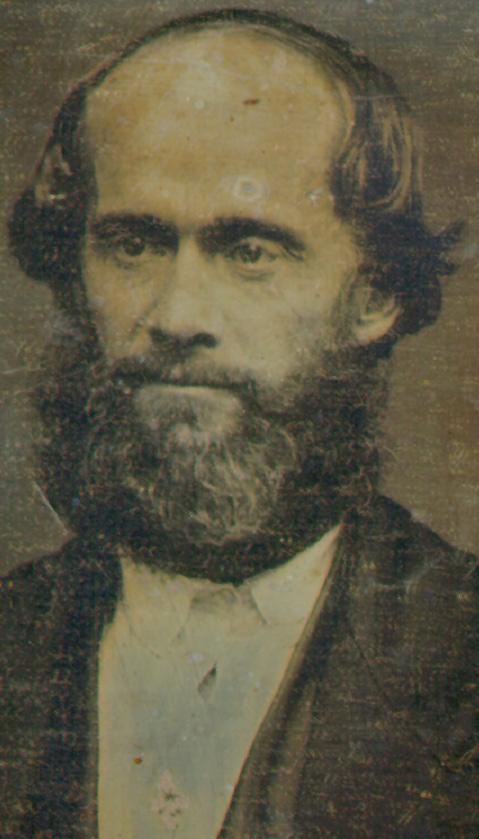
1856 daguerreotype of James Strang, taken on Beaver Island, Lake Michigan, by J. Atkyn, itinerant photographer and later one of Strang's assassins.

James J. Strang was from Scipio, New York and received "no education after the age of 15." Having educated himself, he became a lawyer by the age of 22. He was a latecomer to the Church of Jesus Christ of Latter Day Saints, converting and being baptized and ordained by Joseph and Hyrum Smith in early 1844, both of whom were murdered by an anti-Mormon mob on June 27 of that year. Upon Smith's death, a number of individuals came forward to lead his church, including Strang. As a recent convert, Strang did not yet possess the name recognition among rank-and-file Mormons (Note: "Mormon," as used in this article, refers to adherents of the Latter Day Saint movement as a whole, and not just to its largest branch, the LDS Church. Its use here is only for convenience, not in any derogatory sense.) that was enjoyed by Brigham Young and Sidney Rigdon, two contenders who claimed leadership on the basis of rank - Young as president of the Quorum of the Twelve and Rigdon as sole survivor of the First Presidency. Hence, Strang, as an unknown new convert, faced an uphill battle in his quest to be recognized as the heir to Smith's prophetic mantle.

Strang also claimed to have received an angelic appointment at the very moment of Smith's death, and, like Smith, claimed the ability to translate ancient documents on metal plates into modern English. Strang's position of maintaining the same church structure as Smith, led by a prophet, seer, revelator and translator with the fruits of prophecy - prophetic revelations and translations - continued to win him converts until his assassination twelve years later.

== The letter ==
Unlike Rigdon and Young, Strang offered physical proof of his prophetic calling. Strang possessed a letter purportedly authored by Smith and mailed one week before his murder, prophesying of his impending demise and naming Strang as his successor. The wording of the letter is somewhat ambiguous. Critics who accept the letter as genuinely from Smith interpreted it as appointing Strang solely to the presidency of the newly created Voree Stake, while Strangites insist that it appoints him to Smith's prophetic office and receiver of revelations for the whole church.

=== Events as related in "The Diamond" ===
In his tract "The Diamond," Strang relates this version of events:

This letter was received at Burlington by regular course of mail, coming through the distributing office at Chicago, and bears the Nauvoo postmark of June 19, the day following its date. It arrived at Burlington July 9, and was immediately taken from the office by C. P. Barnes, Esq., a distinguished lawyer at that place, who, in consequence of the rumors of persecution and civil war against the Mormons, and a general anxiety to hear the latest news, immediately carried it to Mr. Strang, with the request to be informed of any news of public interest which it might contain. It therefore became public the same evening.

Emma Smith's testimony corroborates Smith's writing a letter to Strang: "Mrs. Emma Smith recollects well of her husband receiving a letter from Mr. Strang, and holding a council on the subject, and names Hyrum Smith, Willard Richards and John P. Greene as present at that council, and also that a letter was sent to Mr. Strang in answer, but of the import of the answer she was not informed." She and the entire Smith family were persuaded by it enough to declare their support for Strang.

Next, Strang accused the members of the Quorum of the Twelve of conspiring together to suppress evidence of his appointment to the prophetic office–and even the possibility of murder:

Immediately after the martyrdom of Joseph, John Taylor, Willard Richards and William W. Phelps took a kind of temporary direction of the affairs of the church, instructing the saints to wait patiently the hand of the Lord; assuring them that he had not left them without a shepherd, and that all things would be made known in due season. To every question of the saints, Who is the prophet? replies were made, in substance, that the saints would know in due season, but that nothing could be done until the Twelve got home, because the appointment of a prophet and the directions for salvation of the church from the perils they were in, was contained in sealed packages directed to them. Orson Hyde and others of the Twelve, who were then in the east, stated in public congregations in New York, Philadelphia and other cities, that Willard Richards had written to them that the appointment of a prophet was left with him, under seal, to be opened on the return of the Twelve. This assertion was so often made that the whole church were daily expecting to hear a new prophet proclaimed. On the 8th day of August, 1844, when Sidney Rigdon endeavored to obtain authority to lead the church, John P. Green, [sic] marshal of the city of Nauvoo, told them, "They need not trouble themselves about it, for Joseph had appointed one James J. Strang, who lived up north, to stand in his stead." The sudden death of John P. Green immediately after this declaration (under very extraordinary circumstances) left Willard Richards [the cousin of Brigham Young] and John Taylor sole repositors of all documents on this subject, except this letter.

After the return of the Twelve, the alleged promise of the "sealed packages" naming Smith's successor appears to have been dropped.

=== Corroboration in postal records and alleged cover-up ===
When Strang's supporters attempted to prove that Smith had mailed the letter using postal records in Nauvoo, they found that the corresponding portion of the Nauvoo postal records were missing. However, the records remained intact in the Chicago and Burlington post offices, showing that the letter was indeed mailed from Smith to Strang. Although Brigham Young quickly denounced the letter as a "wicked forgery," this did not stop two of the apostles in the Quorum of Twelve from supporting Strang, (Note: William Smith and John E. Page, two members of the Quorum of Twelve under Smith, joined Strang briefly but both had left his movement by 1847.) together with William Marks (Nauvoo Stake president), members of Smith's family (including his sisters, mother and widow) and many others.

== Questions of authenticity ==
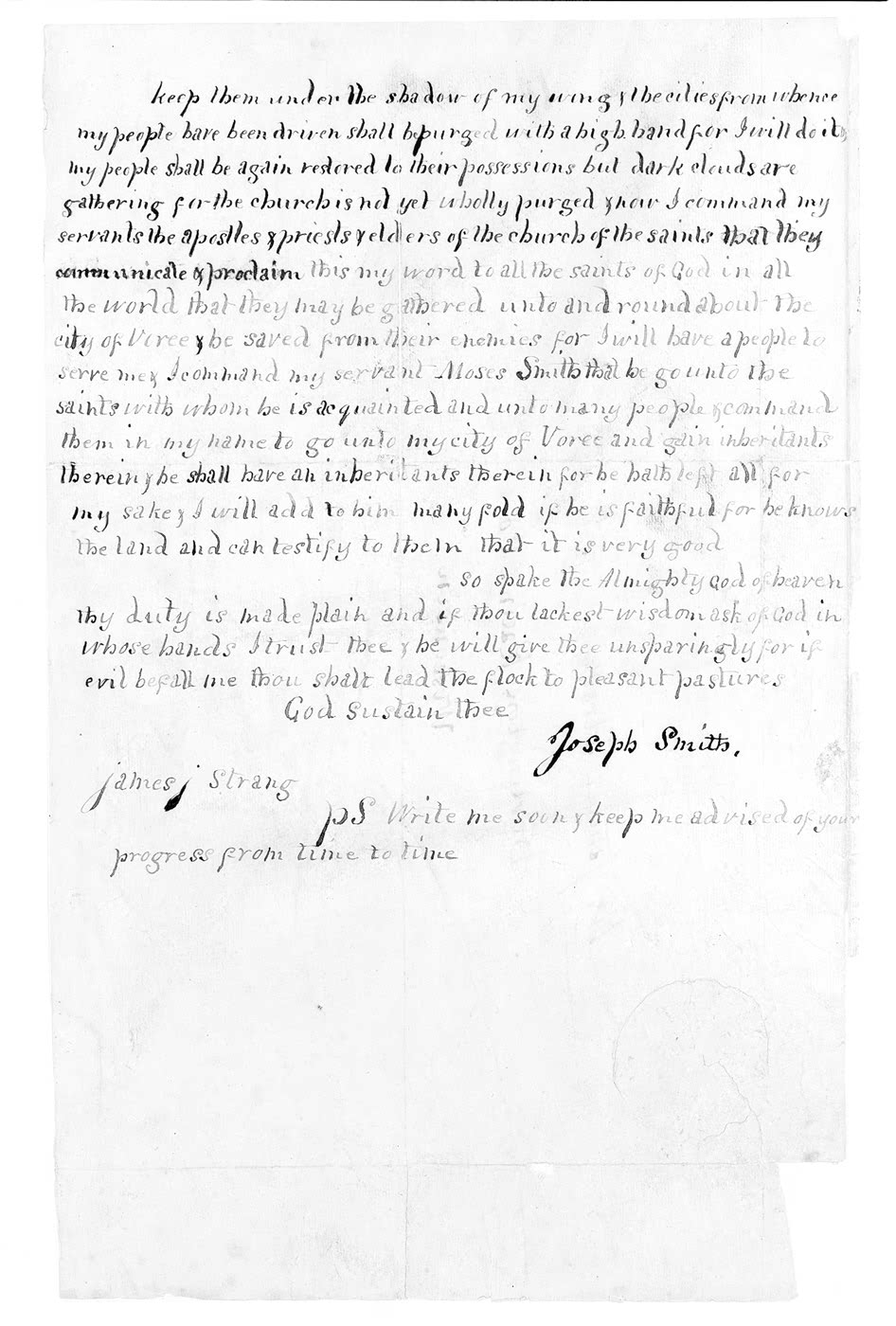
Page three of Strang's "Letter of Appointment," with possible signature of Joseph Smith.

Experts agree that the postmark on the letter is genuine. (Note: The postmark appears on the back side of one of the last page along with Strang's name and address, making the last page effectively the envelope, a common feature of the period.) Strang's opponents at first challenged falsely that the stamp was the wrong color and subsequently challenged the authenticity of the stamp by pointing to a tiny dot on the postmark, just before the "J" in "June"–one that they claimed should not have been there. Strang, however, produced several letters mailed from Nauvoo on June 19, all of which had the same flaw in the stamp, thus confirming its authenticity.

Other critics assert that the outer sheet containing the postmark and address is of different stock than the first two pages, however this is disputed. This theory infers that Strang disposed of the first two pages, retaining the last page with the post mark and composed his own partial letter containing the appointment. Analysis indicates that the handwriting on all three pages is the same. Vague references to Strang's appointment appear throughout the letter. On page one: "The faith which thou hast in the Shepherd, the stone of Israel [Joseph Smith], hath been repaid to thee a thousandfold, and thou shalt be like unto him; but the flock shall find rest with thee, and God shall reveal to thee his will concerning them." Page two continues: "[H]e [Strang] had faith in thee [Smith], the Shepherd and Stone of Israel, and to him shall the gathering of the people be." Page three: "Thy [Strang] duty is made plain . ... [I]f evil befall me [Smith], thou shalt lead the flock to pleasant pastures."

Modern analysts are divided on the authenticity of Smith's signature. The difficulty stems from the fact that Joseph Smith not only had scribes write his letters, but also sign his name for him. Therefore it is difficult to be certain of which signatures and handwriting are actually his, even of known authentic works. Still, some authors have ventured to dispute the signature on this basis. Given that Smith had scribes sign his name on official documents regularly, even if the signature was penned by someone other than Smith, it would not of itself cast doubt on the letter's authenticity.

In 1956, Donna West Falk obtained photostats of three letters that the Illinois Historical Library assert are definitely Joseph Smith's and presented them with a photostat of the Letter of Appointment to the handwriting firm of Tyrell and Doud for analysis, a firm recognized as authorities in court rooms across the country. The letters studied were:
A) A four page letter addressed to Horace H. Hodgekiss, Esg., dated Nauvoo Oct. 25, 1841 (exhibit A),
B) A four page letter addressed to Smith Tuttle, Esq., dated Nauvoo, Ill. Oct. 9, 1841 (exhibit B),
C) A three page letter addressed to H. R. Hodgekiss, Esq., dated Nauvoo, May 13, 1842 (exhibit C) and
D) The Letter of Appointment addressed to James J. Strang, dated Nauvoo, Ill. June 18, 1844 (exhibit D).
None of the three appear to match, consistent with Smith's use of scribes for official letters.

Official Results:

PURPOSE OF EXAMINATION: - You have asked me to determine if possible whether Exhibits A, B, C, and D were written by the same hand.

OPINIONS AND OBSERVATIONS - This case as presented differes from most document cases, since none of the specimens is definitely known to have been written by Joseph Smith. Accordingly, deduction must be made from the evidence at hand in order to fill in the gap of missing information.

EXHIBIT A - It is reasonable to believe that exhibit A could be written by Joseph Smith himself. The writing indicates a person who is interested in getting his thoughts down on paper rather than in the appearance of the writing itself. The post script appears to have been squeezed in as an afterthought and several corrections were made in the text. It is unlikely that these would occur if done by a scrivener for Joseph Smith, but this is somewhat conjecture.

Exhibit B - The body and signature of exhibit B, on the contrary, were written by a different hand than the body and the signature of Exhibit A. The forms of the letters and the skill are fundamentally different. Further, the document is dated less than two months after Exhibit A and it is unlikely that the quality of the hand writing would be better so materially in that short period of time.

The envelope address, however, on Exhibit B appears to be in the same hand as the envelope address on Exhibit B. This evidence would appear to tie together both Exhibit A and B.

Exhibit C - The body and signature of exhibit C in my opinion, are in a different hand than either exhibit A or exhibit B, as is the envelope address. Beneath the signature Joseph Smith to this document appears the words 'per W. Richards-Clerk,' which would indicate this was the person who filled in and signed the document.

Exhibit D - In as much as exhibit D is in handprinting, where as the other documents in question are not, few conclusions are possible.

Despite the lack of agreement in the hand writings of exhibit A, B, and C, and possibly D, these documents were not necessarily authored by persons other than Joseph Smith. Exhibit A, B, and C were written on similar types of stationery, incorporating the letter in the envelope in one document. Then, too, all of the documents bear a Nauvoo postmark and would seem to have the appearance of age.

It must also be remembered that the use of scriveners or letter writers was quite common in those early days and undoubtedly Joseph Smith, being in a position of leadership, would have access to the services of such persons. A brief observation of the language used in these four documents indicates that the education and word usage was consistent with the theory that all four documents were authored by one individual.

— Official report of Tyrell and Doud—Examiners of Questioned Documents, dated October 8, 1956

If Emma Smith's recollections on the writing of the letter were accurate, Joseph, Hyrum, Willard Richards and John P. Greene were present and any of them could have written the letter and signed it. The above analysis would cast doubt on Richards as a handwriting match, however, Exhibit C (indicated as scribed by Richards) was written in long hand, while Exhibit D was written in print. Further authentication would require examples of printed hand writing samples from Hyrum Smith, John P. Green and Willard Richards.

The "letter of appointment" is still accepted and defended by members of the Church of Jesus Christ of Latter Day Saints (Strangite).

== See also ==
- Book of the Law of the Lord
