= Church of Jesus Christ of Latter Day Saints (Strangite) =

Latter Day Saint sect

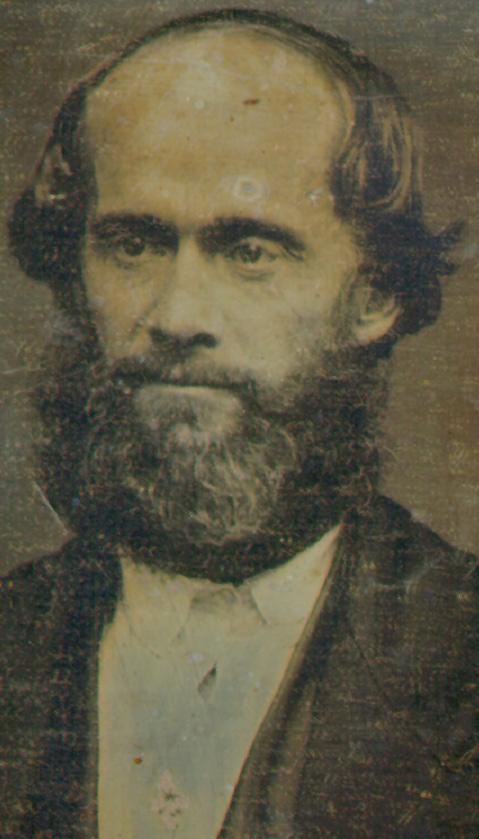
- 1856 daguerreotype of James Strang, taken on Beaver Island, Lake Michigan
- Classification: Latter Day Saint movement
- Orientation: Latter Day Saints
- Theology: Mormonism; Psilanthropist; Unitarian
- Polity: Church conference
- Moderator: None, after Strang's death
- Region: Worldwide
- Founder: Joseph Smith Jr, 1830; James J. Strang, 1844
- Origin: April 6, 1830 (officially given); June 27, 1844 (claimed angelic ordination of Strang); Voree, Wisconsin
- Separated from: Church of Jesus Christ of Latter Day Saints
- Separations: Church of Jesus Christ (Drewite), Church of the Messiah, Holy Church of Jesus Christ, others
- Congregations: 6
- Members: 130

The Church of Jesus Christ of Latter Day Saints—usually distinguished with a parenthetical (Strangite)—is one of the several organizations that claim to be the legitimate continuation of the church founded by Joseph Smith on April 6, 1830. It is a separate organization from the considerably larger and better known The Church of Jesus Christ of Latter-day Saints. Both churches claim to be the original organization established by Joseph Smith. The Strangite church is headquartered in Voree, Wisconsin, just outside Burlington, and accepts the claims of James Strang as successor to Smith. It had approximately 300 members in 1998. An undated FAQ on the church's official website reports there are around 130 active members throughout the United States.

After Smith was murdered in 1844 with no clear successor, several claimants sought to take leadership of the church which Smith founded. Among them was Strang, who competed with other prominent members, notably Brigham Young and Sidney Rigdon.

At its peak, the Strangite Church had about 12,000 members, making them noteworthy rivals to the larger faction of 50,000 led by Brigham Young. Strang was murdered in 1856, after which most of his followers joined Joseph Smith III and his Reorganized Church of Jesus Christ of Latter Day Saints, now called the Community of Christ.

== History ==
=== Before Strang ===
Strangites share the same history with other Latter Day Saint denominations up until the assassination of Joseph Smith. During the resulting succession crisis, several early Mormon leaders asserted claims to succeed Smith, including Sidney Rigdon, Brigham Young and James Strang. Rigdon's claim rested on his status as the senior surviving member of Smith's First Presidency, the church's highest leadership quorum. Rejected by the main church body in Nauvoo, Illinois, Rigdon and his followers moved to Pittsburgh, Pennsylvania, where his organization faltered. A descendant of the Rigdonite church lives on today as The Church of Jesus Christ (Bickertonite), (Note: The "Bickertonites," as they are commonly called, obtained their historical and priesthood lineage from Rigdon's organization, but their beliefs are not identical to Rigdon's sect in every respect.) which is not recognized as legitimate by Strangites.

Brigham Young initially argued that Smith could have no immediate successor, but rather that the Quorum of the Twelve Apostles (of which he was president) should be sustained as the presiding body of the church. Young and his followers migrated west to the Salt Lake Valley, in what became Utah Territory, continuing to use the Church of Jesus Christ of Latter Day Saints as their name until incorporating it in 1851, when the spelling was standardized as "The Church of Jesus Christ of Latter-day Saints".

=== James Strang's appointment letter and the Voree plates ===
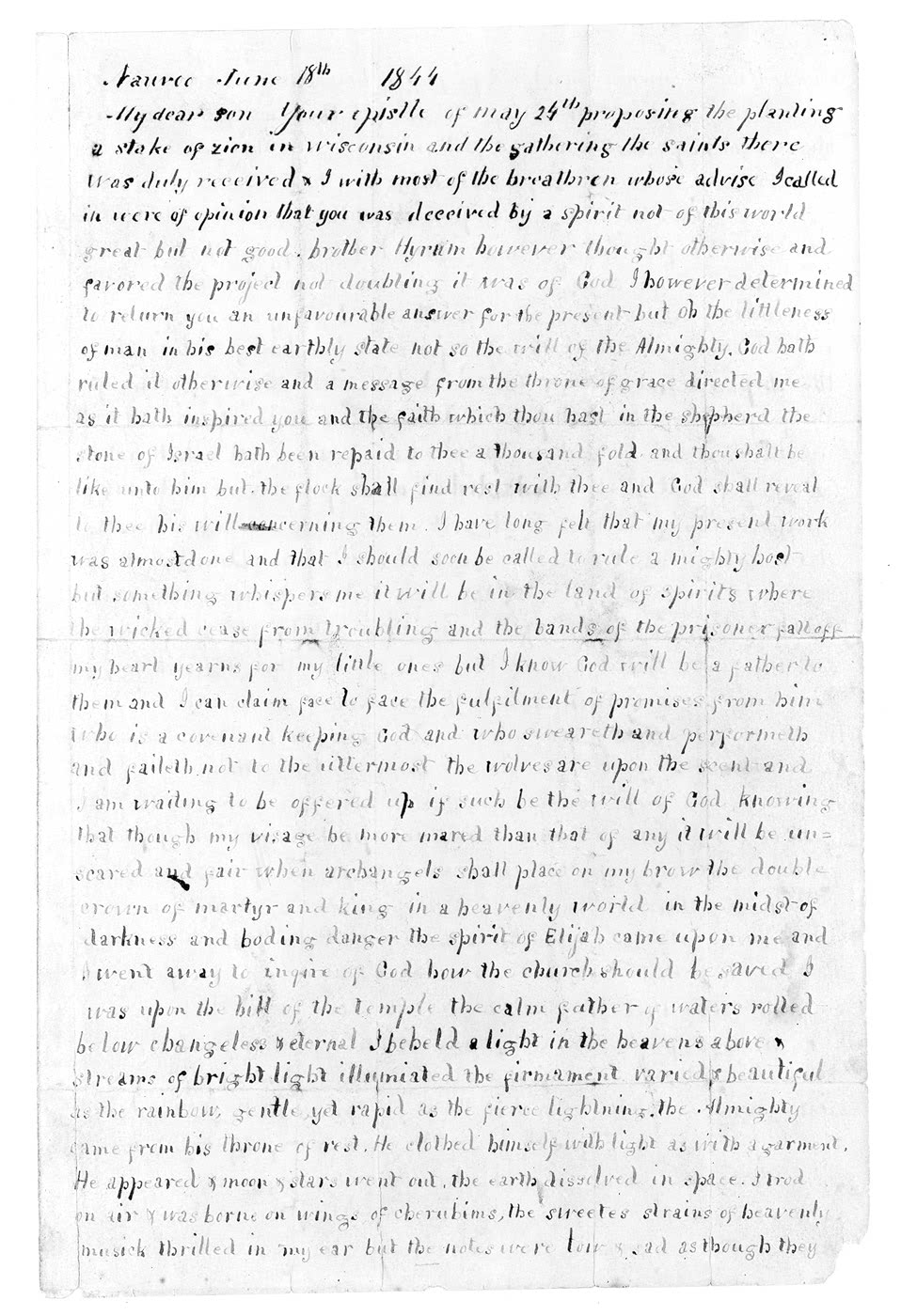
Page one of Strang's Letter of Appointment

Although he was a relatively recent convert at the time of Smith's death, James Strang posed a formidable—and initially quite successful—challenge to the claims of Young and Rigdon. Strang was a Mormon elder charged with establishing a stake or "place of refuge" in Wisconsin, should the Mormons be forced to abandon their headquarters in Nauvoo. He possessed a document that came to be known as the "letter of appointment", alleged to have been written by Smith prior to his death. Critics assert the handwriting of the letter does not graphologically resemble any extant letters written by Smith. Furthermore, wording in the letter was ambiguous; some insist that it only appointed Strang to be president of the new Voree Stake of the church, while Strang and his followers interpreted it as a call to follow Smith as President of the Church. Strang also claimed at the moment of Smith's death, he was visited by angels who ordained him to be Smith's successor, though he claimed no other witnesses to the event.

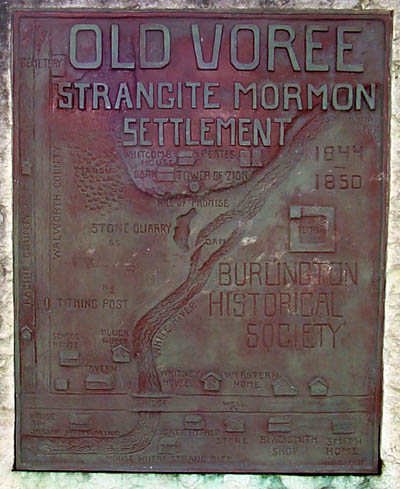
Monument at old Voree townsite

Strang's assertion appealed to many Latter Day Saints who were attracted to Mormonism's doctrine of continuing revelation through a living prophet. In the face of protracted Mormon anguish at Smith's death, Strang insisted that there still was, indeed, a Mormon seer who communed with God and conversed with angels. Strang's claim was bolstered by his discovery of the Voree plates, purporting to contain the last testament of an ancient Native American, one "Rajah Manchou of Vorito". These plates were found in the Hill of Promise, which would become the temple site in the new Strangite town of Voree. (Note: Though construction on a temple was started at this site, it was never completed, due to the poverty and divisions among Strang's followers.) This event was reminiscent of Smith's translations of the golden plates (the Book of Mormon) and the Book of Abraham, and may have encouraged some Latter Day Saints to accept Strang over any of his competitors, who had not produced any such "records".

=== Early successes and losses ===
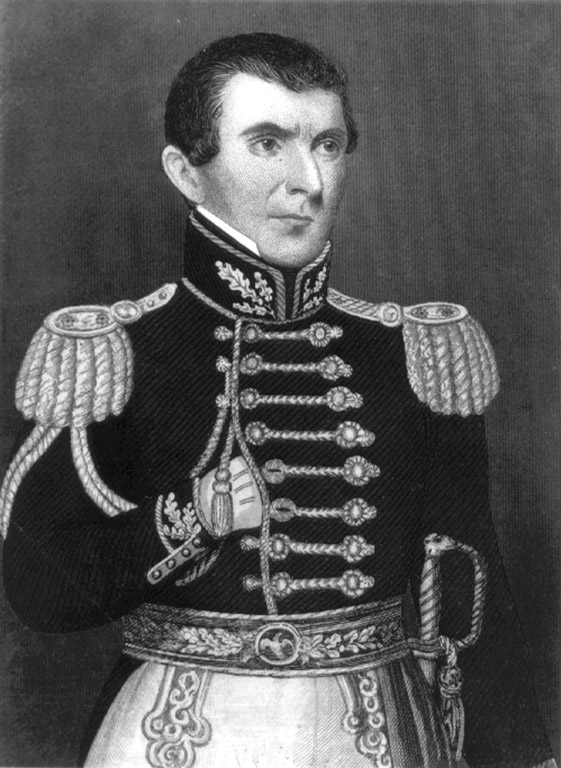
Engraving of John C. Bennett as a General of the Nauvoo Legion

Many prominent Latter Day Saints believed in Strang's "letter of appointment" and accepted him as Mormonism's second "Prophet, Seer, Revelator and Translator"—at least in the short term. These included the church's Presiding Patriarch and apostle William Smith (Smith's only surviving brother); Book of Mormon witness Martin Harris (who left and later rejoined the LDS Church in Utah); Nauvoo Stake President William Marks; second Bishop of the Church and church trustee-in-trust George Miller; apostle John E. Page; former apostle William E. McLellin; Smith's mother Lucy Mack Smith; and other members of the Smith family.

Another adherent was John C. Bennett, former mayor of Nauvoo and a former member of the First Presidency. Bennett had been in Smith's innermost circle but had broken with the founding prophet and had written an anti-Mormon exposé. Bennett founded a secretive Strangite fraternal society known as the "Order of Illuminati", but his presence disrupted Strang's church and ultimately led to his excommunication. Bennett's order fell by the wayside and no longer exists among the Strangites.

All of these persons left the Strangite church by 1850, with the exception of Miller, who would remain lifelong loyal to Strang. Many of these defections were due to Strang's seemingly abrupt about-face on the turbulent subject of polygamy. Vehemently opposed the practice at first, Strang reversed course in 1849 to become one of plural marriage's strongest advocates. Since many of his early disciples had looked to him as a monogamous counterweight to Young's polygamous version of Mormonism, Strang's decision to embrace plural marriage proved costly to him and his church.

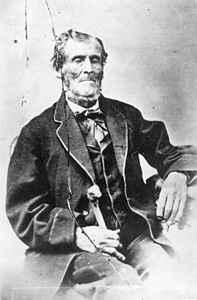
Martin Harris circa 1870, age 87

Strang found his greatest support among the scattered outlying branches of Mormonism, which he frequently toured. His followers may have numbered as many as 12,000, at a time when Young's group had slightly over 50,000. After Strang won a debate at a conference in Norway, Illinois, he converted the entire branch. While in Voree, the Strangites published a periodical known as the Voree Herald. Strang's church also fielded a mission to England, one of the primary sources of early converts to Mormonism. This mission was led by Martin Harris, the financier of the Book of Mormon and one of its Three Witnesses. Harris proved a poor spokesman, however, and the English missions sided with the LDS Church led by Young.

=== Establishing a kingdom on Beaver Island ===
Because the high price of land in the Voree area made it difficult for Latter Day Saints to "gather" there, Strang moved his church headquarters to Beaver Island in Lake Michigan. Here his disciples founded a town known as St. James (now St. James Township), and in 1850, openly established an ecclesiastical monarchy with Strang as the spiritual "king" of his church. The date of his coronation, July 8, is still mandated as one of the two most important days in the Strangite church calendar (the other is April 6, the anniversary of the founding of Smith's church).

Contrary to popular belief, Strang never claimed to be king over Beaver Island, or any other geographical entity. Rather, he asserted that he was king over his church, which he saw as the one, true "Kingdom of God" prophesied in scripture and destined to spread over all the earth. The constitution of this kingdom was contained within the Book of the Law of the Lord, which Strang claimed to have translated from the Plates of Laban mentioned in the Book of Mormon. Originally published in 1851, this new book of Strangite scripture would be republished in a greatly expanded edition in 1856, just after Strang's murder. The book is still revered by Strangites today, remaining a vital part of their canon of scripture.

In addition to printing religious materials, the Strangite printing press on Beaver Island became the source of a new periodical, the Northern Islander, which was the first real newspaper in all of northern Michigan. As St. James became an entrepôt for Great Lakes shipping, the Strangites began to compete with more established commercial lake ports such as Mackinac Island. Tensions grew between Mormons on Beaver Island and their non-Mormon neighbors, which frequently exploded into violence. Accusations of thuggery and thievery were leveled by both parties against each other, compounded by ever-increasing dissension among some of Strang's own disciples, who chafed at what they saw as his increasingly tyrannical rule.

In 1854, Strang published Ancient and modern Michilimackinac, including an account of the controversy between Mackinac and the Mormons. Dale Morgan, a historian of the Latter Day Saint movement, writes: "Strang surveys the geography and history of Mackinac and the surrounding region, particularly the islands of Lake Michigan, and after giving an account of the Mormon settlement upon Big Beaver Island, addresses himself to the bitter controversies between the people of Mackinac and the Mormons. Although dealing with controverted matters and colored by Strang's indignation at the outrages he and his people had to endure, the pamphlet is a responsible source on the events of which it treats, and is also interesting for the considerable measure of learning it reveals in Strang".

Tensions finally came to a head on June 20, 1856, when two Strangite malcontents shot Strang in the back, leading to his death three weeks later. Since Strang refused to appoint a successor, and insisted that the next Strangite prophet must be chosen and ordained by angels just as he and Smith had been, Strang's church was left leaderless and vulnerable. One day before his death, vigilantes from Mackinac Island and other Lake Michigan communities converged on Beaver Island. The Strangites were rounded up, forced onto hastily commandeered steamships, and removed from the island. Most were simply dumped onto docks in Chicago and Green Bay, destitute and deprived of all their property.

=== After Strang ===
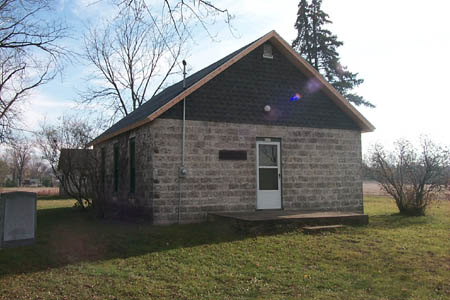
Strangite church building in Voree, Wisconsin (2005)

Strang's death and the loss of his Beaver Island settlement were twin catastrophes for his church. Despondent and spiritually adrift after the Strangite organization failed to provide a successor for Strang, most Strangites eventually chose to join what was then known as the "New Organization" of Latter Day Saints. This group had chosen not to follow Young and would eventually accept the leadership of Joseph Smith III, eldest son of Smith. This "New Organization" was later incorporated as the Reorganized Church of Jesus Christ of Latter Day Saints, becoming the second-largest body in the Latter Day Saint movement.

A few congregations of Strangites, however, remained loyal to their prophet's memory. Wingfield W. Watson, a high priest who had known and served under Strang, kept the Strangite church alive into the 20th century. Strang's disciples today are divided into two main factions; one is led by a Presiding High Priest, who does not claim to have the authority or office possessed by Smith or Strang. The other claims that this first assemblage is in error, and that by incorporating in 1961 and allegedly organizing a new order of the priesthood to rule them and a new man-made set of laws to govern them, it lost its identity as a faithful continuation of Strang's organization. This second group claims that it is the sole true remnant of Strang's church. (Note: The first group has one website: www.ldsstrangite.com; the second has two: www.strangite.org, and www.mormonbeliefs.com.)

The first group no longer emphasizes missionary work, as they tend to believe that after three murdered prophets (Smith, Hyrum Smith, and Strang), God closed his dispensation to the "gentiles" (non-Mormons) of the West. Consequently, this group's congregation remains small. Current membership figures vary between 50 and 300 persons, depending upon the source consulted.

There are two groups among the second. One group has a website based in Independence, Missouri, and the second has a website based in Shreveport, Louisiana. Both conduct missionary work on the Internet.

== Scriptures ==
The Strangites "believe the Bible to be the word of God as far as it is translated correctly; [and] also believe the Book of Mormon to be the word of God", just as do most other Latter Day Saint denominations. They consider editions of the Doctrine and Covenants published prior to Smith's death (which contained the Lectures on Faith) to be scripture.

Strangites hold the Joseph Smith Translation of the Bible to be inspired, but do not believe modern publications of the text are accurate, so they "cautiously use the publication of his earliest corrections published as the 'Inspired Version' or 'Joseph Smith Translation' by the sons of Joseph Smith in Plano, Ill., 1867." Strangites do not have any official stance on the Book of Abraham.

Strang's Book of the Law of the Lord is accepted as scripture in its expanded 1856 form; it is believed to be the same "Book of the Law of the Lord" mentioned in the Bible, and Strang claimed to have translated it from the Plates of Laban mentioned in the Book of Mormon.

The Strangites also hold as scripture several prophecies, visions, revelations, and translations printed by Strang, and published in the Revelations of James J. Strang. This text contains his purported "letter of appointment" from Smith and his translation of the Voree plates. The Book of Jasher was consistently used by both Smith and Strang, but as with other Latter Day Saint denominations, there is no official stance on its authenticity and it is not considered canonical.

== Doctrines ==
=== Monarchy and priesthood ===
One distinctive difference between Strangites and other Latter Day Saints concerns the singular subdivisions Strang makes within the Melchizedek priesthood, which his Book of the Law refers to as "The Priesthood of an endless life", and the Aaronic priesthood, referred to as "the Priesthood of life".

In the Melchizedek priesthood, Strang enumerates two "orders", that of "Apostles", and that of "Priests".

Apostles are subdivided into four "degrees":

- The Prophet/President of the Strangite church is openly referred to throughout the book as a "King", rather than as a "President".
- The President's Counselors are designated as "Viceroys". Viceroys are referred to as "kings", too, though this does not indicate a share in the unique royal dignity accorded to the President/King.
- Strang's Twelve Apostles are named as "Princes in his Kingdom forever". The leader of Strang's Apostles is designated as "Prince and Grand Master of the Seventies".
- A quorum of "Evangelists" (not to be confused with the office of Patriarch) is established, to be Apostles to a single "nation, kindred, tongue or people"—unlike the Twelve, who were sent to all nations. Seven Evangelists form a quorum, and Strang noted that such a body had never been organized "in this dispensation" (and nor did Strang organize one). This is a unique priesthood office in the Latter Day Saint movement.

Priests are subdivided into two "degrees":

- High Priests are to include "all inferiour Kings, Patriarchs, or heads of tribes, and Nobles, or heads of clans". Furthermore, Strang continued, "They who hold it are called Sons of God." From this group, said the Book of the Law, the king is to select "counsellors, judges and rulers". Furthermore, the Book of the Law limits consecration of the Eucharist to High Priests and Apostles, as opposed to other Latter Day Saint sects, who follow the Doctrine and Covenants in permitting Elders and Priests also to do so.
- The "degree" of Elder includes both the offices of Seventy and Elder as generally constituted in Smith's church.

In the Aaronic priesthood, Strang enumerates three "orders":

- Priests are subdivided into two "courses": Sacrificators and Singers. The course of Singers is opened to women. Each temple is to have a Chief Priest, assisted by a first and second High Priest. Strangite "Sacrificators" are to kill sacrifices in accordance with appropriate provisions of the Book of the Law. Female priests are specifically barred from killing sacrifices. The Doctrine and Covenants functions of preaching and baptizing are retained as well.
- Teachers are subdivided into five "degrees": Rabboni, Rabbi, Doctor, Ruler, and Teacher. This office, like that of Priest, is open to women. Teachers are not merely to instruct in spiritual matters, but in secular ones as well. They are to staff schools throughout the kingdom.
- Deacons are subdivided into three "degrees": Marshals, Stewards and Ministers. They are to serve as "Stewards and keepers of the King's prisons, and Stewards of the King's Courts".

In addition, a "King's Council" and a "King's Court" are established, though none function within the Strangite church today. While no direct link is made between the King's Court and the "High Council" established in the Doctrine and Covenants, certain parallels exist, such as requiring all members to hold the High Priesthood, and limiting their number to twelve.

Although Strang briefly retained the services of Apostle William Smith as "Chief Patriarch" of his church, he makes no mention of this office anywhere in his book.

No Apostles (of any degree) exist within the Strangite organization today, as all must be appointed by a Strangite prophet, and the prophet himself must be appointed by God through the direct ministry of angels. The "incorporated" group of Strangites has high priests, but the "non-incorporated" group does not, insisting that the first body does not currently possess authority to ordain any. Both factions enjoy the ministry of Elders and Aaronic Priesthood offices.

=== The Decalogue ===
Another unique feature of the Strangite doctrine is its singular version of the Ten Commandments. The Strangite Decalogue differs from any other Jewish, Catholic or Protestant version, by including the commandment: "Thou shalt love thy neighbor as thyself."

While not in the list of commandments, this admonition appears in the Hebrew Bible in Leviticus 19:18, and five times in the New Testament. In his "Note on the Decalogue", Strang asserted that no other version of the Decalogue contains more than nine commandments and speculated that his fourth commandment was lost perhaps as early as Josephus' time (circa 37–100 AD). Strang's version of the Decalogue (together with the rest of his teaching) are rejected by all non-Strangite Latter-day Saint factions, including The Church of Jesus Christ of Latter-day Saints.

The full text of the fourth commandment according to the Strangites reads:

Thou shalt love thy neighbour as thyself: thou shalt not revile him, nor speak evil of him, nor curse him: thou shalt do no injustice unto him; and thou shalt maintain his right, against his enemy: thou shalt not exact rigorously of him, nor turn aside from relieving him: thou shalt deliver him from the snare and the pit, and shalt return his ox when he strayeth: thou shalt comfort him when he mourns, and nurture him when he sickens: thou shalt not abate the price of what thou buyest of him, for his necessity; nor shalt thou exact of him, because he leaneth upon thee: for in so doing thousands shall rise up and call thee blessed, and the Lord thy God shall strengthen thee in all the work of thy hand.

The Strangite Ten Commandments are as follows.

1. Thou shalt love the Lord thy God with all thy heart, and with all thy might, and with all thy strength.
2. Thou shalt not take the name of the Lord thy God in vain.
3. Remember the Sabbath day, to keep it holy. Six days shalt thou labour, and do all thy work, but the seventh day is the Sabbath of the Lord thy God: in it thou shalt not do any work; thou, nor thy son, nor thy daughter, nor thy manservant, nor thy womanservant, nor thy cattle, nor the stranger that is within thy gates.
4. Thou shalt love thy neighbor as thyself.
5. Honour thy father and thy mother.
6. Thou shalt not kill.
7. Thou shalt not commit adultery.
8. Thou shalt not steal.
9. Thou shalt not bear false witness.
10. Thou shalt not covet thy neighbour's inheritance.

=== Ordination of women ===
As noted above, the Strangite organization opens two priesthood offices to women: Priest and Teacher. While only the "course" of "Singer" in the office of Priest (as opposed to "Sacrificator") is permitted to females, all five "degrees" in the office of Teacher are available. Women may serve as "leaders" of the Singers. Strang ordained women to these ministries as early as 1851, and allowed them to lecture in his School of the Prophets by 1856. Another denomination, the Community of Christ, began ordaining women to the priesthood in 1984, while most other Latter Day Saint churches do not ordain women to the priesthood.

=== Animal sacrifice ===
Animal sacrifice was instituted in the Strangite church under Strang's leadership, primarily as a part of Strangite celebration rituals. Though the chapter on "Sacrifices" in Strang's Book of the Law of the Lord speaks of them as being offered for sins, the prohibition on such sacrifices contained in 3 Nephi 9:19–20, meant that Strang focused instead on sacrifice as an element of religious festivities, especially the commemoration of his own coronation as king (July 8, 1850). The head of every house, from the king to his lowest subject, was to offer "a heifer, or a lamb, or a dove." Every man a clean beast, or a clean fowl, according to his household."

The killing of sacrifices was a prerogative of Strangite Priests, but female Priests were specifically barred from participating in this aspect of the priestly office. "Firstfruits" offerings were also demanded from all Strangite agricultural harvests.

Animal sacrifices are no longer practiced by the Strangites, but belief in their correctness is still required.

=== Monotheism and the vocation of Jesus Christ ===
Strangites reject both the traditional Christian doctrine of the virgin birth of Jesus Christ and the Mormon doctrine of plurality of gods. They insist that there is but one eternal God, the Father, and that alleged progression to godhood (a doctrine supposedly taught by Smith, but Strangites reject that assertion) is impossible. They believe that God has always been God, and he is one Person (not three, as in the traditional Christian Trinity).

Jesus Christ, Strangites believe, was the natural-born son of Mary and Joseph, who was chosen from before all time to be the Savior of mankind, but who had to be born as an ordinary mortal of two human parents (rather than being begotten by the Father or the Holy Spirit) to be able to truly fulfill his Messianic role. Strang claimed that the earthly Christ was in essence "adopted" as God's son at birth, and fully revealed as such during the transfiguration. After proving himself to God by living a perfectly sinless life, he was thus enabled to provide an acceptable sacrifice for the sins of men, prior to his resurrection and ascension.

=== Free agency ===
Musing at length on the nature of sin and evil, Strang wrote that of all things that God could give to man, he could never give him experience. Thus, if "free agency" were to be real, humanity must be given the opportunity to fail and to learn from its own mistakes. The ultimate goal for each human being, according to Strangites, is to willingly conform oneself to the revealed character of God in every way, preferring good to evil not out of any fear of punishment or desire for reward, but rather "on account of the innate loveliness of undefiled goodness; of pure unalloyed holiness."

=== Sabbatarianism ===
Strangites observe the seventh-day Sabbath—i.e., Saturday—as the Book of the Law commanded it, in lieu of Sunday.

=== Baptism for the dead ===
Strangites believe in baptism for the dead and practiced it to a limited extent in Voree and on Beaver Island. However, rather than simply baptizing for anyone whose name can be located, Strang required a revelation for those seeking to have a baptism done for someone outside of a close relative "within the fourth degree of consanguinity". This could come through dreams, angelic appearances, or other means listed within Strang's revelation on the subject. While still believed in, baptisms for the dead are not currently performed in the Strangite church due to the lack of a temple and prophetic leadership.

=== Eternal marriage ===
Eternal marriage is taught in the Strangite church, but unlike in the LDS Church, it is not required to be performed in a temple. Strangite Priests, Elders, High Priests or Apostles (of all four degrees) may perform this ceremony. Eternal marriages are still contracted among the Strangites today.

Same-sex marriage and homosexuality in general are not permitted within the Strangite organization.

=== Conservation of resources ===
Conservation of forests and resources is mandated by the Strangites. Within Strang's Beaver Island kingdom and other places where Strangites were numerous, groves of trees were to be maintained upon each farm, village and town. Farms and cities without trees were required to plant them, and to establish parklands so that "the aged and the young may go there to rest and to play." Although Strang's kingdom has disappeared, his followers still endeavor to practice basic conservation measures.

=== Polygamy ===
Plural marriage is sanctioned but not expressly commanded, in the Book of the Law. The applicable text reads: "Thou shalt not take unto thee a multitude of wives disproportioned to thy inheritance, and thy substance: nor shalt thou take wives to vex those thou hast; neither shalt thou put away one to take another." Any wife already married to the prospective polygamist was given the right to express her opinion, and even to object, but not to veto the marriage. This passage seems to offer any aggrieved wife an appeal to the "Judges", but how this was to be carried out is not made clear.

Strang's defense of polygamy was rather woman-centered. He claimed that far from enslaving or demeaning women, it liberated and "elevated" them by allowing them to choose the best possible mate based upon any factors deemed important to them even if that mate were already married to someone else. Rather than being forced to wed "corrupt and degraded sires" from the scarcity of more suitable men, a woman could wed the one she saw as the most compatible to herself, the best candidate to father her children and the man who could give her the best possible life, no matter how many other wives he might have.

The practice of plural marriage has never been officially proscribed in the Strangite church, unlike in the LDS Church. Only twenty-two men entered into polygamy, and most of them took only one additional wife. Strang took four additional wives, the most of any member in his church.

Polygamy was apparently practiced by a few Strangites up to 1880 or so, including by Wingfield W. Watson, a Strangite High Priest who knew and served under Strang. However, with federal and state bans on the practice, and a divine injunction to obey "the law of the land", plural marriage has been given up in the contemporary Strangite organization, though belief in its correctness is still required and affirmed.

Strangites reject Section 132 of the LDS Church's Doctrine and Covenants, regarding it as a forgery from 1852 that was never received or approved by Smith.

=== Temples ===
Strang began to construct a temple in Voree, but was prevented from completing it because of the poverty and the lack of co-operation of his followers. No "endowment" rituals comparable to those in the LDS Church appear to have existed among his followers, and Strangites believe that only a prophet of God has the ability to receive a revelation to direct the building of a Temple. Because there is no current prophet of the church, there are no current plans for the creation of a Temple.

=== African Americans ===
Strangites welcomed African Americans into their church when some other factions (such as the LDS Church, until 1978) denied them the priesthood or certain other benefits of membership. Strang ordained at least two African Americans to the eldership during his lifetime.

== See also ==
- George J. Adams
- Current state of polygamy in the Latter Day Saint movement
