= Seymour Brunson =

American missionary (1798–1840)

Seymour Brunson (September 18, 1799 – August 10, 1840) was an early convert to the Church of Jesus Christ of Latter-day Saints. He is most noted since it was at a speech given at his funeral that Joseph Smith first presented the doctrine of Baptism for the Dead.

Brunson was born on September 18, 1799, in Virginia. His parents were Reuben and Salley Clark Brunson. In 1813, at the age of 14, he enlisted in the United States military as a 16-year-old and served during the War of 1812.

In 1823, Brunson married Harriet Matilda Gould. They eventually had seven children.

Brunson was baptized a member of Church of Christ in January 1831 in Strongsville, Ohio. He served as a missionary in both Ohio and Virginia and then moved to Daviess County, Missouri, just south of Far West. After a year he moved into the town. It was Brunson who, in April 1838, brought the charges against Oliver Cowdery that led to Cowdery's excommunication. During that fall, Brunson served as a major in the Daviess County militia. After this, he moved to Quincy, Illinois, for a short time and then on to Nauvoo, Illinois.

At Nauvoo, Brunson served as a member of the High Council and as a lieutenant colonel in the Hancock County Militia. He also served as one of Joseph Smith's bodyguards.

He died on August 10, 1840.

== Sources ==
- Brunson, Lewis (1992). "Short Sketch of Seymour Brunson, Sr" (PDF). Nauvoo Journal. 4: 3–4.
- BYU Studies–Mormon Biographical Register–B
