= Baptism for the dead =

Baptizing a person on behalf of one who is dead

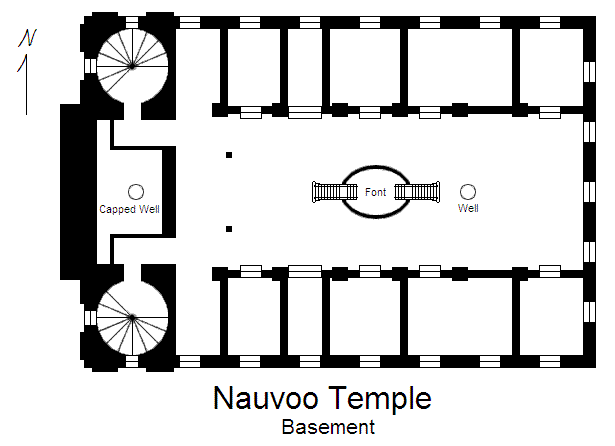
Floorplan of the Nauvoo Temple basement. The basement of the temple was used as the baptistery, containing a large baptismal font in the center of the main room.

Posthumous Baptism, Baptism for the dead, vicarious baptism or proxy baptism today commonly refers to the religious practice of baptizing a person on behalf of one who is dead—a living person receiving the rite on behalf of a deceased person.

Baptism for the dead is best known as a doctrine of the Latter Day Saint movement, which has practiced it since 1840. It is currently practiced by the Church of Jesus Christ of Latter-day Saints (LDS Church), where it is performed only in dedicated temples, as well as in several other current factions of the movement. Those who practice this rite view baptism as an essential requirement to enter the Kingdom of God, and therefore practice baptism for the dead to offer it by proxy to those who died without the opportunity to receive it. The LDS Church teaches that those who have died may choose to accept or reject the baptisms done on their behalf.

Baptism for the dead is mentioned in 1 Corinthians 15:29 as proof of a physical resurrection, though the exact meaning of the phrase is an open question among scholars. The plainest reading of the Greek text suggests vicarious baptisms performed by the living on behalf of the deceased, but some scholars dispute whether Paul approved of the practice or whether the verse truly refers to an actual physical practice among early Christians. Early heresiologists Epiphanius of Salamis (Panarion 28) and Chrysostom (Homilies 40) attributed the practice respectively to the Cerinthians and to the Marcionites, whom they identified as heretical "Gnostic" groups, while Ambrosiaster and Tertullian affirmed that the practice was legitimate and found among the New Testament Christians (though Tertullian later recanted his original beliefs in his later life as he became associated with Montanism).

== Early Christianity ==
Latter-day Saint scholar John A. Tvedtnes says: "Baptism for the dead was performed by the dominant church until forbidden by the sixth canon of the Council of Carthage (397). Some of the smaller sects, however, continued the practice." He does not give the text of that canon, which, if it is included in Canon 18 of The Code of Canons of the African Church, reads: "It also seemed good that the Eucharist should not be given to the bodies of the dead. For it is written: 'Take, Eat', but the bodies of the dead can neither 'take' nor 'eat'. Nor let the ignorance of the presbyters baptize those who are dead."

Epiphanius of Salamis (between 310 and 320 – 403) reported that he had heard it said that, among followers of Cerinthus, if one of them died before baptism, another was baptized in that person's name:

For their school reached its height in this country, I mean Asia, and in Galatia as well. And in these countries I also heard of a tradition which said that when some of their people died too soon, without baptism, others would be baptized for them in their names, so that they would not be punished for rising unbaptized at the resurrection and become the subjects of the authority that made the world. And the tradition I heard of says that this is why the same holy apostle said, 'If the dead rise not at all, why are they baptized for them?' But others explain the text satisfactorily by saying that, as long as they are catechumens, the dying are allowed baptism before they die because of this hope, showing that the person who has died will also rise, and therefore needs the forgiveness of his sins through baptism.

John Chrysostom (c. 347–407) mockingly attributes to the Marcionites of the late 4th century a similar practice: if one of their followers who was being prepared for baptism died before receiving baptism, the dead person's corpse was addressed with the question whether he wished to be baptized, whereupon another answered affirmatively and was baptized for the dead person.

=== Interpretations of 1 Corinthians 15:29 ===
In 1 Corinthians 15:29, Paul writes: "Else what shall they do which are baptized for the dead, if the dead rise not at all? why are they then baptized for the dead?" This passage appears in the midst of Paul's argument for the resurrection of the dead, a central theme of the chapter. The verse has generated substantial debate among theologians, historians, and biblical scholars. Its meaning and the nature of the practice it describes remain uncertain, and no consensus exists as to whether Paul endorsed, merely reported, or criticized the practice. Interpretations of the verse range from literal readings involving vicarious baptisms, to metaphorical, ritual, and rhetorical understandings. The passage has also been linked by some scholars to Jewish purity laws and Second Temple traditions, while others have proposed connections to early Christian or even Gnostic practices.

==== Interpretations in the Early Church ====
Early Christian writers offered differing views on the meaning of Paul's statement in 1 Corinthians 15:29. Some acknowledged the existence of vicarious baptism practices, while others provided more symbolic or theological explanations.

Tertullian (c. 155 – c. 220) is one of the earliest Christian authors to comment on the passage. In his work On the Resurrection of the Flesh, he appears to accept that some Christians practiced vicarious baptism for the dead, stating: "Now it is certain that they adopted this [practice] with such a presumption that made them suppose that the vicarious baptism would be beneficial to the flesh of another in anticipation of the resurrection."

Later in life, however, Tertullian changed his interpretation. In Against Marcion, he downplays the literal practice and argues instead that the phrase "baptized for the dead" should be understood as being "baptized for the body," since the human body is destined to die and rise again. He maintains that Paul's reference to the practice served only to reinforce the doctrine of bodily resurrection.

Ambrosiaster, an anonymous Christian author writing between 366 and 384, also acknowledges the existence of the practice, noting that "some people were at that time [New Testament period] being baptized for the dead because they were afraid that someone who was not baptized would either not rise at all or else rise merely in order to be condemned."

John Chrysostom (c. 347 – 407), in his homilies on 1 Corinthians, rejects a literal interpretation and offers a metaphorical reading. He suggests that Paul was referring to individuals who were baptized in hope of their own future resurrection. In this view, "for the dead" refers not to other people, but to the baptized person's own mortality and hope for eternal life.

==== Theological and Scholarly Interpretations ====
Modern and historical scholars have proposed a variety of interpretations of 1 Corinthians 15:29, ranging from literal understandings of vicarious baptism to metaphorical, ritualistic, and rhetorical readings. These interpretations often reflect broader theological commitments regarding resurrection, ritual purity, and early Christian identity.

===== Vicarious Baptism =====
Some scholars and early Christian writers interpret the passage as describing a literal practice in which living individuals were baptized on behalf of the dead. The HarperCollins Study Bible notes that Paul appears to refer to an actual practice among the Corinthians, though the origins and scope of the practice remain uncertain: "Why the Corinthians practiced baptism on behalf of the dead is unknown; see also 2 Macc 12:44–45." In 2 Maccabees 12:44–45, Judas Maccabeus takes up a collection for a sin offering on behalf of fallen soldiers who had died wearing idolatrous amulets. The text commends this action as noble and motivated by belief in the resurrection, stating that "it was a holy and pious thought" to make atonement for the dead, "that they might be delivered from their sin." This has been interpreted by some as evidence of intercessory practices for the dead within certain Jewish traditions of the Second Temple period.

===== Metaphorical and Symbolic Readings =====
Several Church Fathers and Reformation-era theologians interpreted the phrase symbolically. John Chrysostom, for instance, believed Paul was referring to individuals who were baptized in view of their own eventual death, thus expressing hope in resurrection.

Some modern commentators understand "baptism for the dead" as a metaphor for martyrdom, pointing to New Testament passages such as Mark 10:38 and Luke 12:50, where baptism symbolizes suffering or death. According to this view, Paul refers to people who undergo baptism (or martyrdom) with the expectation of a future resurrection.

Reformers offered their own symbolic interpretations. Martin Luther suggested the phrase may refer to being baptized "above" the graves of the dead, based on one possible meaning of the Greek preposition ὑπέρ. John Calvin proposed it referred to baptism received by those near death, as a final profession of hope in the resurrection.

===== Jewish ritual washing =====
Another interpretation focuses on the linguistic context of the Greek verb baptizein, which in Jewish Greek can refer to ritual washings (baptismos) rather than Christian baptism (baptisma). These ritual washings, especially those associated with corpse impurity under the Mosaic law (e.g., Numbers 19), were common in the Second Temple period. Scholar Peter Leithart suggests Paul may have been referring to Jewish purification rites for those who had come into contact with the dead. On this view, the phrase may allude to ritual acts intended to restore purity in anticipation of resurrection.

===== Apostolic reference theory =====
New Testament scholar Joel R. White proposes that Paul was referring to baptisms performed in response to the death of Christian leaders, such as the apostles, especially Apollos or Paul himself. In this view, "the dead" refers not to anonymous deceased persons, but to prominent Christian figures whose deaths inspired renewed commitment through baptism.

===== Patronage interpretation =====
Eastern Orthodox theologian Stephen De Young proposes that the phrase refers to early Christian converts being baptized "for" or "in the name of" deceased Christian saints. This interpretation sees baptism as establishing a relationship of spiritual patronage, in which the baptized is united with a specific saint whose name or memory they take on. De Young argues that the Greek preposition ὑπέρ ("for") can imply representation or honor, and that the definite article ("the dead") likely refers to specific deceased Christians already mentioned earlier in the chapter (e.g., the apostles and other witnesses to Christ's resurrection).

===== Gnostic or esoteric readings =====
Scholar Elaine Pagels has argued that the passage reflects sacramental theology found in Gnostic or semi-Gnostic groups, such as the Valentinians. According to Pagels, Paul's mention of baptism for the dead may have been adopted by later groups who performed baptismal rites for "psychic" believers through the spiritual elect.

==== Paul's perspective ====
A key question in interpreting 1 Corinthians 15:29 is whether Paul himself approved of the practice he mentions. Scholars remain divided on this issue. Some argue that Paul refers to the practice rhetorically, as part of his broader argument for the resurrection of the dead. He writes, "what will they do who are baptized for the dead, if the dead are not raised at all?"—implying that even those who undergo the practice believe in resurrection, and thus reinforcing his central theological point. According to this view, Paul does not necessarily endorse or promote the practice but uses it to appeal to the logic of those who did.

The wording of the verse also contributes to ambiguity. Paul uses the third person plural ("they") rather than directly addressing the Corinthian believers as "you," leading some scholars to infer that he may be referencing a practice that was not his own or not universally accepted. The Tyndale Bible Dictionary, for instance, concludes that Paul likely did not approve of the practice.

Other scholars are more cautious. The note in the Catholic New American Bible states: "This practice is not further explained here, nor is it necessarily mentioned with approval, but Paul cites it as something in their experience that attests in one more way to belief in the resurrection."

The HarperCollins Study Bible takes a more neutral view, acknowledging the literal sense of the text while noting the lack of clarity about its context or theological endorsement: "Why the Corinthians practiced baptism on behalf of the dead is unknown."

Even early Christian writers recognized this ambiguity. In his later writings, Tertullian remarked that Paul's mention of the practice, "whatever it may have been," was used merely to underscore the importance of the resurrection of the body—not to validate the practice itself.

== Latter-day Saint practice and teachings ==
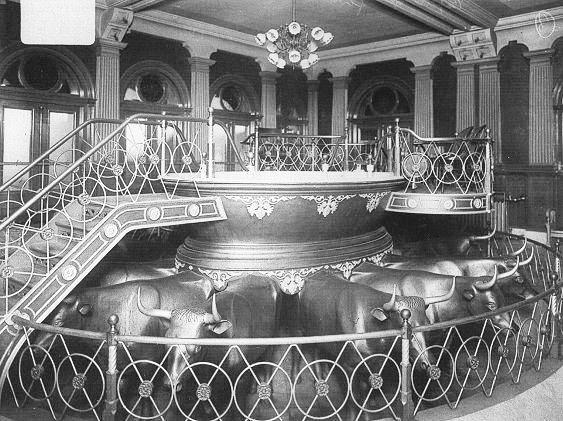
Baptismal font in the Salt Lake Temple, circa 1912, where baptisms for the dead are performed by proxy. The font rests on the backs of twelve oxen representing the Twelve Tribes of Israel.

In the practice of the LDS Church, a living person, acting as proxy, is baptized by immersion on behalf of a deceased person of the same sex. Baptism for the dead is an LDS Church ordinance, performed only in temples, and is based on the belief that baptism is required for entry into the Kingdom of God.

Church members believe that baptism is a prerequisite for entry into the kingdom of God as stated by Jesus in John 3:5: "Except that a man be born of water and of the Spirit, he cannot enter into the kingdom of God" (KJV).

The LDS Church teaches that performing baptisms for the dead allows this saving ordinance to be offered on behalf of those who have died without accepting or knowing Jesus Christ or his teachings during their mortal lives. It is taught that this is the method by which all who have lived upon the earth will have the opportunity to receive baptism and to thereby enter the Kingdom of God.

Among other Biblical references, Latter-day Saints cite Peter's statements that Jesus preached to the spirits of the dead (KJV 1 Peter 3:19; 4:6) as evidence that God in his justice provides an opportunity for the deceased to hear and accept the gospel, if they don't receive that chance in mortality. As Peter affirmed in Acts 2:37–38, the next step after acceptance of the gospel is baptism for the remission of sins, which "doth also now save us" (KJV 1 Peter 3:21).

The LDS Church teaches that those in the afterlife who have been baptized by proxy are free to accept or reject the ordinance done on their behalf. Baptism on behalf of a deceased individual is not binding if that individual chooses to not accept it in the afterlife.

Any member of the LDS Church, male or female, beginning in the year they turn 12 years old, who holds a current temple recommend may act as a proxy in this ordinance. Men must also hold the Aaronic priesthood prior to entering the temple. Men act as proxies for deceased men, and women as proxies for deceased women. The concept of a spiritual proxy is compared by some in the LDS Church to the belief that Jesus acted as a proxy for every human when he atoned for the sins of the world.

Historically, only adult male holders of the Melchizedek priesthood who had undergone the endowment ordinance were permitted to baptize others as proxies for the dead. In 2018, this policy was changed to allow boys who hold the Aaronic priesthood office of priest, generally between 15 and 18 years old, to also officiate in baptisms for the dead.

=== Modern origin ===
According to the Latter-day Saint doctrine, the practice of baptism for the dead is based on a revelation received by the prophet Joseph Smith. Smith first taught the doctrine at the funeral sermon of a deceased church member, Seymour Brunson. In a letter written on October 19, 1840, to the church's Quorum of the Twelve Apostles (who were on a mission in the United Kingdom at the time), Smith refers to the passage in 1 Corinthians 15:29 (KJV):

I presume the doctrine of 'baptism for the dead' has ere this reached your ears, and may have raised some inquiries in your minds respecting the same. I cannot in this letter give you all the information you may desire on the subject; but aside from knowledge independent of the Bible, I would say that it was certainly practiced by the ancient churches; and Saint Paul endeavors to prove the doctrine of the resurrection from the same, and says, 'Else what shall they do which are baptized for the dead, if the dead rise not at all? Why are they then baptized for the dead?'

LDS Church scripture expands further upon this doctrine and states that such baptisms are to be performed in temples. Vicarious baptism is performed in connection with other vicarious ordinances in temples of the Church, such as the endowment and celestial marriage.

Initially, women could be baptized for dead men, and vice versa; this, however, was changed in order to ensure that the person being baptized for a dead man could also be ordained on their behalf to the priesthood.

=== Genealogy and baptism ===
The LDS Church teaches that deceased persons who have not accepted, or had the opportunity to accept, the gospel of Christ in this life will have such opportunity in the afterlife. The belief is that as all must follow Jesus Christ, they must also receive all the ordinances that a living person is expected to receive, including baptism. For this reason, members of the LDS Church are encouraged to research their genealogy. This research is then used as the basis for church members performing temple ordinances for as many deceased persons as possible. As a part of these efforts, Latter-day Saints have performed temple ordinances on behalf of a number of high-profile people, including the Founding Fathers of the United States, U.S. Presidents, most Catholic popes, John Wesley, Christopher Columbus, Adolf Hitler, Joan of Arc, Genghis Khan, Joseph Stalin, and Gautama Buddha. However, as of 2024, submitting the names of famous individuals, Jewish Holocaust victims, and the names of deceased individuals from unauthorized extraction projects to the LDS Church (generally through FamilySearch) for them to receive proxy ordinances is generally against Church policy.

While members of the LDS Church consider vicarious ordinances for the deceased an act of compassionate service, some non-members have taken offense. Sensitive to the issue of proxy baptizing for non-members not related to church members, the LDS Church in recent years has published a general policy of performing temple ordinances only for relatives. For example, the LDS Church is in the process of removing sensitive names (such as Jewish Holocaust victims) from its International Genealogical Index (IGI). D. Todd Christofferson of the church's Presidency of the Seventy stated that removing the names is an "ongoing, labor intensive process requiring name-by-name research .... When the Church is made aware of documented concerns, action is taken .... Plans are underway to refine this process." The LDS Church keeps records of the temple ordinances performed for deceased persons; however, FamilySearch, a web application for accessing its genealogical databases, shows information on temple ordinances only to registered church members and not to non-members.

In 2008, a directive from the Vatican Congregation for the Clergy directed Catholic dioceses to prevent the LDS Church from "microfilming and digitizing information" contained in Catholic sacramental registers so that those whose names were contained therein would not be subjected to vicarious baptism. Earlier, the Vatican had declared that baptisms performed by Latter-day Saints were invalid.

==== Groups ineligible to participate in baptisms for the dead ====
Some groups of people were historically or are currently ineligible for performing and/or participating in the ordinance of baptisms for the dead. Priesthood ordination to at least the office of a priest is required before performing any baptisms for the dead, and all women continue to not be ordained to the priesthood. For about 130 years (between 1847 and 1978) priesthood ordinations were also denied to all Black men in a controversial priesthood racial restriction. From the mid-1960s until the early 1970s under church president David O. McKay, Black members of all genders were barred from participating in any baptisms for the dead.

As of 2023, all priesthood ordinations, and participating in baptisms for the dead continue to be denied for any person in a same-sex marriage or homosexual sexual relationship, and transgender individuals including trans men continue to be ineligible for all priesthood ordinations. Ordinances such as receiving the priesthood necessary to perform baptisms or participating in baptisms for the dead are only done according to birth sex. Transgender individuals who are "attempting to transition to the opposite gender" cannot maintain a temple recommends necessary for baptisms for the dead. These restrictions have also garnered criticism from both outside, and inside the LDS Church.

=== Controversy ===
==== Jewish Holocaust victims ====
The LDS Church performs vicarious baptisms for individuals regardless of their race, sex, creed, religion, or morality. Some church members have been baptized for both victims and perpetrators of The Holocaust, including Anne Frank and Adolf Hitler, contrary to modern church policy. Some Jewish Holocaust survivors and some Jewish organizations have objected to this practice.

Since the early 1990s, the LDS Church has urged members to submit the names of only their own ancestors for ordinances, and to request permission of surviving family members of people who have died within the past 95 years. Hundreds of thousands of improperly submitted names not adhering to this policy have been removed from the records of the church. Church apostle Boyd K. Packer has stated the church has been open about its practice of using public records to further temple ordinance work.

Despite the guidelines, some members of the church have submitted names without adequate permission. In December 2002, independent researcher Helen Radkey published a report showing that, following a 1995 promise from the church to remove Jewish Holocaust victims from its International Genealogical Index, the church's database included the names of about 19,000 who had a 40 to 50 percent chance "to be Holocaust victims ... in Russia, Poland, France, and Austria." Genealogist Bernard Kouchel searched the International Genealogical Index, and discovered that many well known Jews had been vicariously baptized, including Maimonides, Albert Einstein, and Irving Berlin, without family permission.

LDS Church official D. Todd Christofferson told The New York Times that the church expends massive amounts of resources attempting to purge improperly submitted names, but that it is not feasible to expect the church to find each and every last one, and that the agreement in 1995 did not place this type of responsibility on the centralized church leadership.

Jewish groups, including the Simon Wiesenthal Center, spoke out against the vicarious baptism of Holocaust perpetrators and victims in the mid-1990s and again in the 2000s when they discovered the practice, which they consider insensitive to the living and the dead, was continuing. The associate dean of the Simon Wiesenthal Center, Abraham Cooper, complained that infamous figures such as Adolf Hitler and Eva Braun appeared on genealogical records: "Whether official or not, the fact remains that this is exactly the kind of activity that enraged and hurt, really, so many victims of the Holocaust and caused alarm in the Jewish community."

In 2008, the American Gathering of Jewish Holocaust Survivors announced that, since church members had repeatedly violated previous agreements, it would no longer negotiate with the church to try to prevent vicarious baptism. Speaking on the anniversary of Kristallnacht, Ernest Michel, a Holocaust survivor who reported on the Nuremberg Trials, speaking as the honorary chairman of the American Gathering of Holocaust Survivors, called on the LDS Church to "implement a mechanism to undo what [they] have done", and declared that the Church had repeatedly violated their agreements, and that talks with Latter-day Saint leaders were now ended. Jewish groups, he said, would now turn to the court of public opinion for justice. Michel called the practice a revision of history that plays into the hands of Holocaust deniers, stating: "They tell me, that my parents' Jewishness has not been altered but ... 100 years from now, how will they be able to guarantee that my mother and father of blessed memory who lived as Jews and were slaughtered by Hitler for no other reason than they were Jews, will someday not be identified as Mormon victims of the Holocaust?"

LDS Church officials, in response, stated that the church does not teach that vicarious baptisms coerce deceased persons to become members of the church, nor does the church add those names to its list of church members. Church officials have also stated that, in accordance with the 1995 agreement, it has removed more than 300,000 names of Jewish Holocaust victims from its databases, as well as subsequently removing names later identified by Jewish groups. Church officials stated in 2008 that a new version of the FamilySearch application had been developed and was being implemented in an effort to prevent the submission of Holocaust victim names for temple ordinances.

In February 2012, the issue re-emerged after it was found that the parents of Holocaust survivor and Jewish rights advocate Simon Wiesenthal were added to the genealogical database. Shortly afterward, news stories announced that Anne Frank had been baptized by proxy for the ninth time, at the Santo Domingo Dominican Republic Temple.

== Other churches of the Latter Day Saint Movement ==
Some members of the early Reorganized Church of Jesus Christ of Latter Day Saints (now Community of Christ) also believed in baptism for the dead, but it was never officially sanctioned by that organization and was considered highly controversial.

At a 1970 church world conference, a revelation and two letters written by Joseph Smith appertaining to baptism for the dead were removed as sections and placed in the appendix of their Doctrine and Covenants; at a 1990 world conference, the three documents were removed entirely from their scriptural canon.

In the Restoration Branches movement, which broke from the Reorganized Church in the 1980s, the question of baptism for the dead is at best unsettled. Many adherents reject the validity of the ordinance completely.

Other Latter Day Saint denominations that accept baptism for the dead include the Church of Jesus Christ of Latter Day Saints (Strangite), The Church of Jesus Christ (Cutlerite), and the Righteous Branch (Christ's Church). The Strangite Church performed baptisms for the dead during the 1840s in Voree, Wisconsin, and later during the 1850s on Beaver Island, Michigan. In each case, the practice was authorized on the basis of what James J. Strang reported as a revelation. The question of whether the Strangite Church still practices proxy baptism is an open one, but belief is considered orthodox.

== Other Christian churches ==
As part of their sacraments, the New Apostolic Church and the Old Apostolic Church also practice baptism for the dead, as well as Communion and Sealing to the Departed. In this practice a proxy or substitute is baptized in the place of an unknown number of deceased persons. According to NAC and OAC doctrine the deceased do not enter the body of the substitute.

== See also ==
- Genealogical Society of Utah
- Sealing power
- Ordinances (Latter Day Saints)
