= Voree, Wisconsin =

Unincorporated community in the United States

- Unincorporated Community
- Map of Wisconsin highlighting Walworth County where the unincorporated community of Voree is located
- Interactive map of Voree, Wisconsin
- Country: United States
- State: Wisconsin
- County: Walworth
- Founder: James Strang founded Voree in 1844 (independent communal settlement)
- Named for: Voree means "Garden of Peace"
- Time zone: CST
  - Summer (DST): CDT
- Area code: 262
- Website: www.burlington-wi.gov

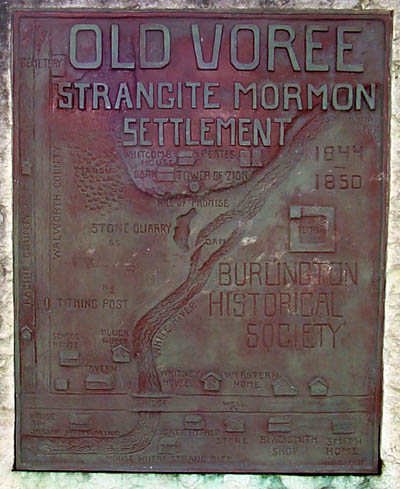
A map of old Voree, engraved on a monument at the townsite.

Voree (/vɔːriː/) is an unincorporated community in the Town of Spring Prairie in Walworth County, Wisconsin, United States. It is best known as the headquarters of the Church of Jesus Christ of Latter Day Saints (Strangite), a denomination of the Latter Day Saint movement. According to James Strang, founder of the Strangite church and of the town, the name means "Garden of Peace". The community is situated along former Wisconsin Highway 11, just west of the Racine County line.

== Strangite settlement ==
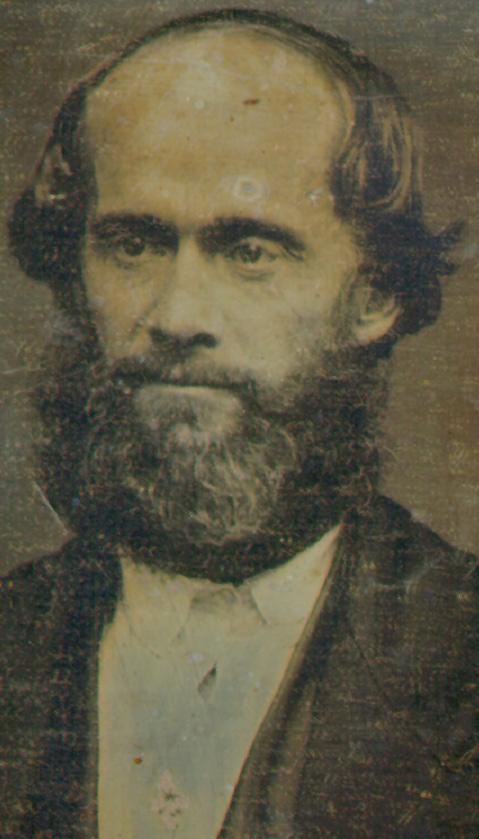
1856 daguerreotype of James Strang, taken on Beaver Island, Michigan the year of his death by J. Atkyn, itinerant photographer who later became one of Strang's assassins

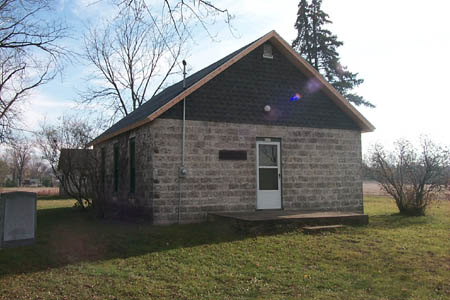
Strangite church building in Voree (2005) 42.682414°N 88.305882°W

Although the Voree area was inhabited by Native Americans prior to the arrival of the first Europeans, the most notable part of its history begins in 1844, after the death of Joseph Smith Jr., founder of the Latter Day Saint movement. James J. Strang, who had declared himself Smith's successor, established Voree, then within the Wisconsin Territory as a "gathering place" for those Latter Day Saints who chose to follow his leadership rather than that of Brigham Young or other claimants. Strang's followers moved from Nauvoo, Illinois and other places to Voree. Young's followers relocated to the Salt Lake Valley in what would ultimately become the Utah Territory, where they established the Church of Jesus Christ of Latter-day Saints (LDS Church), which is now the largest Latter Day Saint denomination. The Strang, Young, and several other church organizations claimed to be the sole legal continuance and succession leader of Joseph Smith's church, each rejecting all claims to legitimacy by the others.

The "Strangite" church established a quarry and built many fine stone houses, several of which survive. Their community included a blacksmith shop, tavern, school and a tithing house. The church excavated a foundation for their intended temple, but were unable to finish it due to poverty and internal dissent. They also published newspapers the Voree Herald and Zion's Reveille in the town. Tombstone carving, plough manufacturing, and the raising of English Fox Terriers were some of Voree's business enterprises.

A small hill in Voree, known as the "Hill of Promise", became noteworthy as the location where James Strang allegedly unearthed the Voree Plates. These three small metal plates, purportedly containing the ancient record of "Rajah Manchou of Vorito" (alleged to be an ancient inhabitant of the area), became a scripture of Strang's church and are still accepted by his followers today. Baptisms for the Dead were performed in the White River, which flowed through the settlement. These have not been conducted since Strang's lifetime due to a lack of prophetic leadership, though the Strangites still believe in the validity of this doctrine, as do members of the LDS and certain other Mormon factions.

== Relocation to Beaver Island ==
Because land prices in the Voree area were high, it was difficult for church members to "gather" to the settlement and purchase farmlands. Additional trouble ensued when a group of Strangite leaders, led by Aaron Smith, rejected Strang and formed a schismatic group in Voree. For these and other reasons, Strang relocated his church headquarters to Beaver Island by 1848. Most of his members followed him where he was crowned the Mormon king of Beaver Island, though a small minority elected to remain in Voree. Opposition in Beaver Island ultimately led to the fatal wounding of Strang in June 1856; he returned to Voree, where he died weeks after the shooting. His followers were forcibly expelled from the island, and most abandoned his church entirely. A loyal remnant remained, however, with many of them choosing to return to Voree and nearby areas. The Strangite church still considers Voree to be a "gathering place" for its members.

== Voree today ==
The diminutive Strangite organization continues to maintain a presence in Voree to this day. Two different factions maintain meetinghouses there; at least one has a congregation that meets there regularly. There are also two Internet-based groups of Strangites at Independence, Missouri and Shreveport, Louisiana. The historical society at nearby Burlington has erected a monument at Voree to commemorate the Strangite settlement there.
