= Wingfield W. Watson =

Religious leader of the Latter Day Saint Strangites

Wingfield Scott Watson (April 22, 1828 – October 29, 1922) was a religious leader of the Latter Day Saint Strangites. He was an Irish immigrant to the United States. He was baptized as a member of the Church of Jesus Christ of Latter-day Saints (LDS Church) but was an advocate of the Strangite sect throughout his life.

== Early life ==
Wingfield Scott Watson was born April 22, 1828, in Ireland. He was the son of Elizabeth Leviston and Thomas Wingfield. His father was an arithmetician and a book keeper. Watson recorded that his father was a good flutist and that his mother was a "country girl." Watson was one of eleven children. His parents were Protestant.

== St. Louis ==
Watson moved to the United States in 1848. He received money from his oldest brother, Thomas, to make the trip, and he left on February 16, 1848. He traveled from Liverpool to New Orleans, where he landed on April 21, 1848. He then traveled up to St. Louis. Watson found work chopping wood. He later worked in a brickyard. He also worked in coal pits.

In St. Louis, Watson heard of the LDS Church. He read a pamphlet called "River Guide" that told of the assassination of Joseph Smith and the expulsion of the Latter Day Saints from Nauvoo, Illinois. He also read Parley P. Pratt's book, Voice of Warning to All Nations. Watson moved to Clifton in Grant County, Wisconsin, on June 20, 1850. There he began working in lead mines.

Watson married Jane Thompson, who he met while working in the mines. At the time, Jane was widowed and had a young infant son named Robert, whom Watson adopted. He also read the Book of Mormon and decided to travel to Salt Lake City to join the Latter-day Saints. He returned to St. Louis and was baptized by a Mormon missionary named William Gibson. While returning to Wisconsin, Watson met Samuel Shaw, who was an elder of James Strang's Church of Jesus Christ of Latter Day Saints. Watson accompanied Shaw to Nauvoo, Illinois. He then went with Shaw to Beaver Island, Michigan. They arrived on June 23, 1852. Instead of traveling farther to Salt Lake, Watson decided to stay in Beaver with the Strang colony.

== Leaving Beaver Island ==
Watson kept records for Strang and accompanied Strang until Strang was murdered on Beaver Island on June 18, 1856. This led to fear that other Strangite leaders would be killed, so they left the island. Watson left for Chicago, Illinois, in July of that year, and the Strangite colony disintegrated.

Watson then moved to Livingston, Wisconsin. After some time, however, he was approached by Lorenzo Dow Hickey, who was one of the Strangite church's apostles. Hickey convinced Watson to move to Black River Falls, Wisconsin, where several of the residents of Beaver Island were living. Six years later, Hickey convinced Watson to move again, but this time to Boyne City, Michigan. There Watson became a leader of the Strangites. He published pamphlets and preached to the people. He wrote letters from 1862 to 1883 to affirm Strang's authority. Watson lived in Michigan until 1891.

== Contributions to the Strangite faith ==
The Strangites believed that James Strang was the rightful successor to Joseph Smith. The group formed after the death of Smith and is separate from the LDS Church, which teaches that Brigham Young was Smith's successor.

Watson contributed to the Strangite church for seventy-two years. He published thirteen pamphlets related to the church. They included "The Prophetic Controversy, A Letter from James J. Strang to Mrs. Corey" and "The Necessity of Baptism; and of Having Authority from God to Preach the Gospel". He later debated with Willard Blair of the Reorganized Church of Jesus Christ of Latter Day Saints from October 22 to October 26, 1891. This debate was published as "The Watson Blair Debate Which Took Place at East Jorday, Michigan Commencing Oct. 22 and Ending Oct. 26,1891". He converted Edward T. Couch to the Strangite faith as well. Couch later published other pamphlets defending the religion.

In 1891, Watson also went to live in Wisconsin again, in Spring Prairie. On June 11, 1897, he became a Presiding High Priest of the church, which was led by Hickey.

== Later life ==
In 1907, Watson moved to Voree, Wisconsin. The Strangites believed that this area had been sanctified by God as a settling place of the Latter Day Saints. His wife, Jane, died in 1908. He died on October 29, 1922.
