= James Strang =

American Mormon leader (1813–1856)

James J. Strang
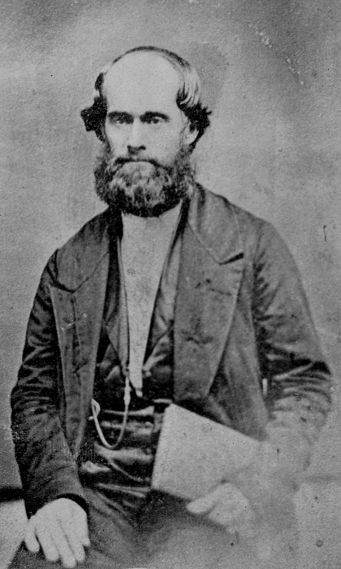
- Strang in 1856

Founder of the Church of Jesus Christ of Latter Day Saints (Strangite)
- c. June 1844 – July 9, 1856
- Predecessor: None (Strang Claimed to be the Successor of Joseph Smith. No evidence to back him up.)
- Successor: No successor to date

Member of the Michigan House of Representatives

In office
- 1853 – July 9, 1856
- Political party: Democratic

Personal details
- Born: James Jesse Strang; March 21, 1813; Scipio, New York, United States
- Died: July 9, 1856 (aged 43); Voree, Wisconsin, United States
- Cause of death: Gunshot wound
- Resting place: Burlington Cemetery; 42°40′59.16″N 88°15′30.96″W
- Spouse(s): Mary Perce (m. 1836; sep. 1851) Elvira Eliza Field (m. 1849) Betsy McNutt (m. 1852) Sarah Wright (m. 1855) Phoebe Wright (m. 1855)
- Children: 14
- Parents: Clement Strang; Abigaile James

James Jesse Strang (March 21, 1813 – July 9, 1856) was an American religious leader, politician and self-proclaimed monarch. He served as a member of the Michigan House of Representatives from 1853 until his assassination.

In 1844, he said he had been appointed as the successor of Joseph Smith as leader of the Church of Jesus Christ of Latter Day Saints (Strangite), (Note: The Strangites use no hyphen in their church title and capitalize the "D" in "Day", just as was done in Joseph Smith's church.) a faction of the Latter Day Saint movement. Strang testified that he had possession of a letter that he had fabricated from Smith naming him as his successor, and furthermore reported that he had been ordained to the prophetic office by an angel. His followers believe his organization to be the sole legitimate continuation of the Church of Christ founded by Smith fourteen years before.

A major contender for leadership of the Church of Jesus Christ of Latter Day Saints during the 1844 succession crisis after Smith's death, Strang urged other prominent church leaders like Brigham Young and Sidney Rigdon to remain in their previous offices and to support his appointment by Smith. Young and the members of the Twelve Apostles loyal to him rejected Strang's claims, as did Rigdon, who had been a counselor in the First Presidency to Smith. This divided the Latter Day Saint movement. During his 12 years tenure as Prophet, Seer and Revelator, Strang reigned for six years as the crowned "king" of an ecclesiastical monarchy that he established on Beaver Island in the US state of Michigan. Building an organization that eventually diminished compared to Young's in Utah, Strang gained nearly 12,000 adherents at a time when Young was said to have about 50,000. After Strang was killed in 1856 most of his followers rallied under Joseph Smith III and joined the Reorganized Church of Jesus Christ of Latter Day Saints (RLDS). The Strangite church has remained small in comparison to other branches of the Latter-Day Saint movement.

Similar to Joseph Smith, who was alleged by church opponent William Marks to have been crowned King in Nauvoo prior to his death, Strang taught that the chief prophetic office embodied an overtly royal attribute. Thus, its occupant was to be not only the spiritual leader of his people but their temporal king as well. He offered a sophisticated set of teachings that differed in many significant aspects from any other version of Mormonism, including that preached by Smith. Like Smith, Strang published translations of two purportedly ancient lost works: the Voree Record, deciphered from three metal plates reportedly unearthed in response to a vision; and the Book of the Law of the Lord, supposedly transcribed from the Plates of Laban mentioned in the Book of Mormon. These are accepted as scripture by his followers, and the Church of Jesus Christ in Christian Fellowship, but not by any other Latter Day Saint church. Although his long-term doctrinal influence on the Latter Day Saint movement was minimal, few early members of Strang's organization helped to establish the RLDS Church (now known as the Community of Christ), which became (and remains) the second-largest Latter Day sect. While most of Strang's followers eventually disavowed him due to his eventual advocacy of polygamy, a small but devout remnant carries on his teachings and organization today.

In addition to his ecclesiastical calling, Strang served one full term and part of a second as a member of the Michigan House of Representatives, assisting in the organization of Manitou County. He was also at various times an attorney, educator, temperance lecturer, newspaper editor, Baptist minister, correspondent for the New York Tribune, and amateur scientist. His survey of Beaver Island's natural history was published by the Smithsonian Institution in 1854, remaining the definitive work on that subject for nearly a century, while his career in the Michigan legislature was praised even by his enemies.

While Strang's organization is formally known as the Church of Jesus Christ of Latter Day Saints, the term "Strangite" is usually added to the title to avoid confusing them with other Latter Day Saint bodies carrying this or similar names. This follows a typical nineteenth-century usage where followers of Brigham Young were referred to as "Brighamites", while those of Sidney Rigdon were called "Rigdonites", followers of Joseph Smith III were called "Josephites", and disciples of Strang became "Strangites". (Note: Strangites still use these terms today, as do members of some other Latter Day Saint groups.)

== Childhood, education and conversion to Mormonism ==
James Jesse Strang was born March 21, 1813, in Scipio, Cayuga County, New York. He was the second of three children, and his parents had a good reputation in their community. Strang's mother was very tender with him as a consequence of delicate health, yet she required him to render an account of all his actions and words while absent from her. In a brief autobiography he wrote in 1855, Strang reported that he had attended grade school until age twelve, but that "the terms were usually short, the teachers inexperienced and ill qualified to teach, and my health such as to preclude attentive study or steady attendance." He estimated that his time in a classroom during those years totaled six months.

But none of this meant that Strang was illiterate or simple. Although his teachers "not unfrequently turned me off with little or no attention, as though I was too stupid to learn and too dull to feel neglect," Strang recalled that he spent "long weary days ... upon the floor, thinking, thinking, thinking ... my mind wandered over fields that old men shrink from, seeking rest and finding none till darkness gathered thick around and I burst into tears." He studied works by Thomas Paine and the Comte de Volney, whose book Les Ruines exerted a significant influence on the future prophet.

As a youth, Strang kept a rather profound personal diary, written partly in a secret code that was not deciphered until over one hundred years after it was authored. This journal contains Strang's musings on a variety of topics, including a sense that he was called to be a significant world leader the likes of Caesar or Napoleon and his regret that by age nineteen, he had not yet become a general or member of the state legislature, which he saw as being essential by that point in his life to his quest to be someone of importance. However, Strang's diary reveals a heartfelt desire to be of service to his fellow man, together with agonized frustration at not knowing how he might do so as a penniless, unknown youth from upstate New York.

At age twelve, Strang was baptized a Baptist. He did not wish to follow his father's calling as a farmer, so he took up the study of law. Strang was admitted to the bar in New York at age 23 and later at other places where he resided. He became county Postmaster and edited a local newspaper, the Randolph Herald. Later, in the midst of his myriad duties on Beaver Island, he would find time to found and publish the Daily Northern Islander, the first newspaper in northern Michigan.

Strang, who once described himself as a "cool philosopher" and a freethinker, became a Baptist minister but left in February 1844 to join the Church of Jesus Christ of Latter Day Saints. He quickly found favor with Joseph Smith, though they had known each other only a short time, and was baptized personally by him on February 25, 1844. On March 3 of that year he was ordained an Elder by Joseph's brother Hyrum and sent forthwith at Smith's request to Wisconsin, to establish a Mormon stake at Voree. Shortly after Strang's departure, Joseph Smith was murdered by an anti-Mormon mob in Carthage, Illinois.

== Succession claim and notable early allies ==
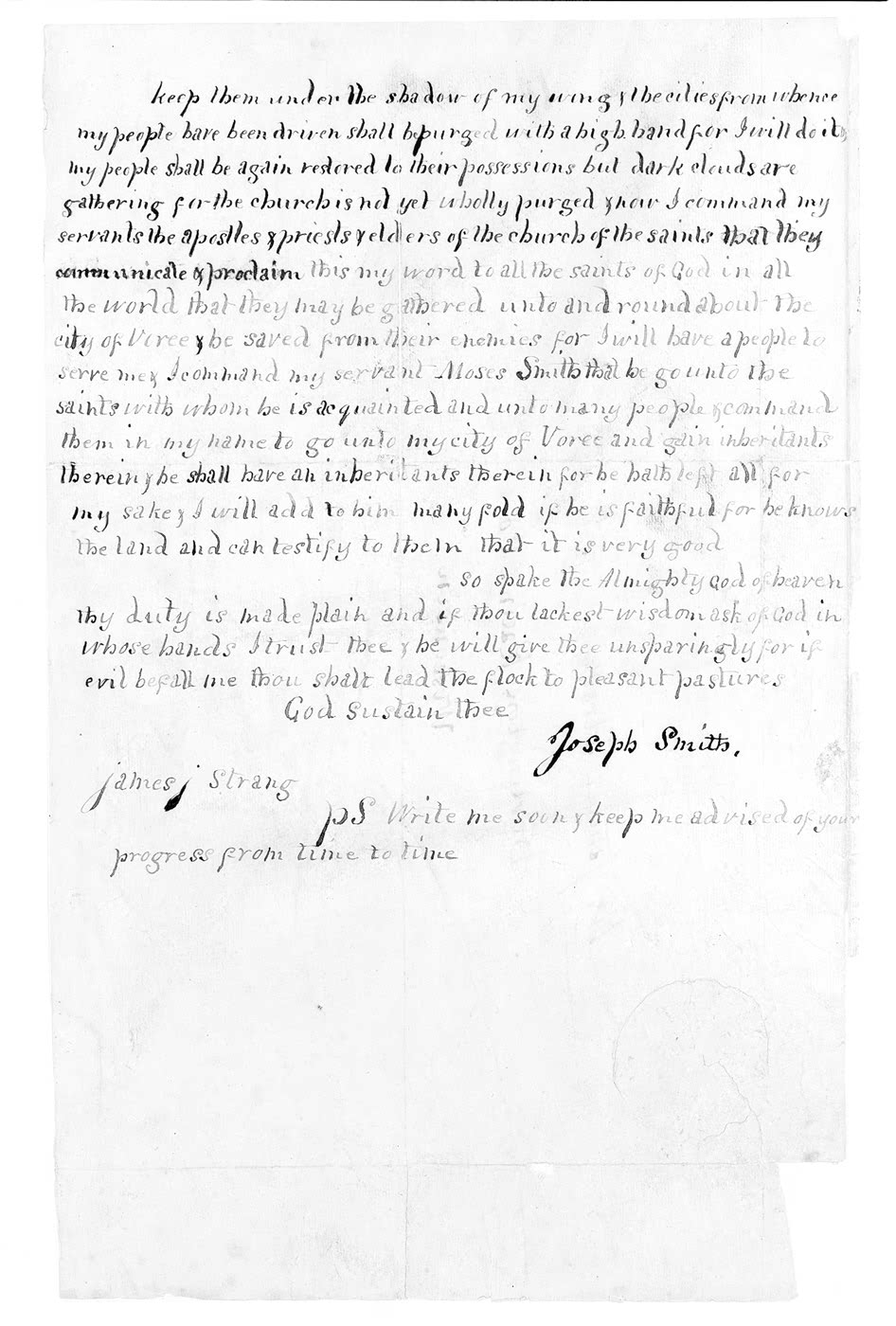
Page three of Strang's "Letter of Appointment"

After Smith's death, Strang claimed the right to lead the Latter Day Saints, but he was not the only claimant to Smith's prophetic mantle. His most significant rivals were Brigham Young, president of Smith's Twelve Apostles, and Sidney Rigdon, a member of Smith's First Presidency. A power struggle ensued, during which Young quickly disposed of Rigdon in a Nauvoo debate. Young would reject offers to debate with Strang for the next three years before leading his followers to Utah while Rigdon led a smaller group to Pennsylvania. As a newcomer to the faith Strang did not possess the name recognition, or a more prominent calling like his rivals, so his prospects of assuming Smith's prophetic mantle appeared shaky at first. But this did not dissuade him. Though the Quorum of Twelve quickly published a notice in the Times and Seasons of Strang's excommunication, Strang insisted that the laws of the church prevented excommunication without a trial. He equally asserted that the Twelve had no right to sit in judgment on him, as he was the lawful church president. He began to attract several Mormon luminaries to his side, including Smith's brother William Smith (an Apostle in Smith's church), Smith's mother Lucy Mack Smith, and William Marks, president of the Nauvoo Stake.

Strang rested his claim to leadership on an ordination by an angel at the very moment Joseph Smith died (similar to the ordination of Smith), requirements that he claimed were set forth in the Doctrine and Covenants that the President had to be appointed by revelation and ordained by angels, and a "Letter of Appointment" from Smith, carrying a legitimate Nauvoo postmark. This letter was dated June 18, 1844, just nine days before Smith's death. Smith and Strang were some 225 miles (362 km) apart at the time, Strang offered witnesses to affirm that he had made his announcement before news of Smith's demise was publicly available. Strang's letter is held today by Yale University. Every aspect of the letter has been disputed by opposing factions, including the postmark and the signature however the postmark is genuine and at least one firm (Tyrell and Doud) hired to analyse the document and compare it to Smith's known letters concluded that it was likely to have been authored by Smith. They concluded "A brief observation of these four documents indicates that the education and word usage was consistent with the theory that all four documents were authored by one individual."

There have been several conflicting claims about the authenticity of the letter. One disaffected member of Strang's church said they received a confession from Strang's law partner, C. P. Barnes, that he had fabricated the Letter of Appointment and the Voree Plates. Another member of the Brighamites stated years after Strang's death to have forged the letter himself and mailed it to Strang as a prank. There are no reliable firsthand statements, however, by witnesses or insiders that question the validity of the letter.

Strang's letter convinced several eminent Mormons of his claims, including Book of Mormon witnesses John and David Whitmer, Martin Harris, and Hiram Page. (Note: David Whitmer and Martin Harris, two of the Three Witnesses, and Hiram Page and John Whitmer of the Eight Witnesses.) In addition, apostles John E. Page, William E. McLellin, and William Smith, (Note: John Page and William Smith were apostles at Smith's death; William M'Lellin had previously been an apostle, but was excommunicated in 1838.) together with Nauvoo Stake President William Marks, and Bishop George Miller, (Note: George Miller, who is mentioned in the LDS Doctrine & Covenants section 124: verses 20, 62 and 70.) accepted Strang. Joseph Smith's mother, Lucy Mack Smith, and three of his sisters accepted Strang's claims. According to the Voree Herald, Strang's newspaper, Lucy Smith wrote to one Reuben Hedlock: "I am satisfied that Joseph appointed J.J. Strang. It is verily so." According to Joseph Smith's brother William, all of his family (except for Hyrum and Samuel Smith's widows), endorsed Strang.

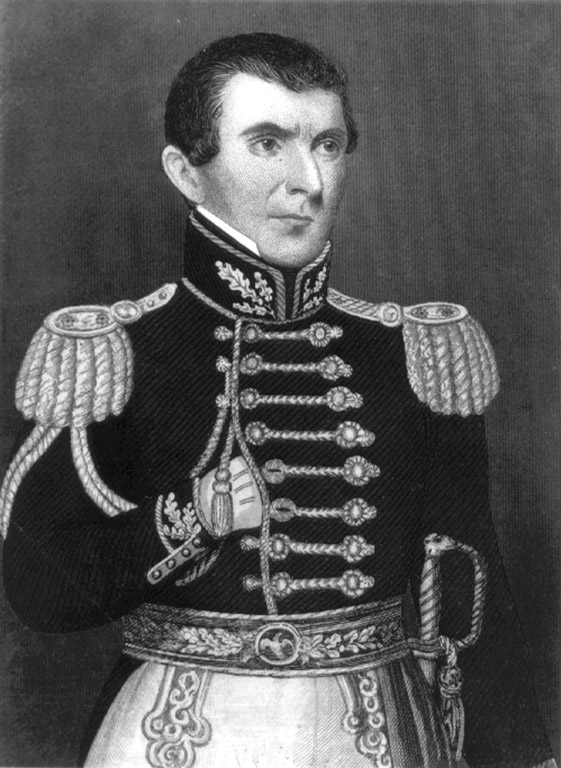
Engraving of John C. Bennett as a General of the Nauvoo Legion

Also championing Strang was John C. Bennett, a physician and libertine who had a tumultuous career as Joseph Smith's Assistant President and mayor of Nauvoo. Invited by Strang to join him in Voree, Bennett was instrumental in establishing a so-called "Halcyon Order of the Illuminati" there, with Strang as its "Imperial Primate". Eventually, as in Nauvoo, Bennett fell into disfavor with the church and Strang expelled him in 1847. His "order" fell by the wayside and has no role in Strangism today, though it did lead to conflict between Strang and some of his associates.

== From monogamist to polygamist ==
About 12,000 Latter Day Saints ultimately accepted Strang's claims. A second "Stake of Zion" was established on Beaver Island in Lake Michigan, where Strang moved his church headquarters in 1848. Strang's church had a high turnover rate, with many of his initial adherents, including all of those listed above (with the exception of George Miller, who remained loyal to Strang until death), leaving the church before his demise. John E. Page departed in July 1849, accusing Strang of dictatorial tendencies and concurring with Bennett's furtive "Illuminati" order. Martin Harris had broken with Strang by January 1847, after a failed mission to England. Hiram Page and the Whitmers also left around this time.

Many defections, however, were due to Strang's seemingly abrupt "about-face" on the turbulent subject of polygamy. Vehemently opposed to the practice at first, Strang reversed course in 1849 and became one of its strongest advocates, marrying five wives (including his original spouse, Mary) and fathering fourteen children. Since many of his early disciples viewed him as a monogamous counterweight to Brigham Young's polygamous version of Mormonism, Strang's decision to embrace plural marriage proved costly both to him and his organization. Strang defended his new tenet by claiming that, far from enslaving or demeaning women, polygamy would liberate and "elevate" them by allowing them to choose the best possible mate based upon any factors which were deemed important by them. Rather than being forced to wed "corrupt and degraded sires" due to the scarcity of more suitable men, a woman could marry the man who she believed was most compatible to her, the best candidate to father her children and give her the finest possible life, even if he had multiple wives.

At the time of his death, all four of Strang's current wives were pregnant, and he had four posthumous children.

Strang's wives and children
Wife	Marriage	Age		Children together
Wife	Marriage	Bride	Groom	Children together
Mary Abigail Content Perce; 1818–1880	m. November 20, 1836 sep. May 1851	18	23	Mary Elizabeth 1838–1843; Myraette Mabel 1840–1925; William J. 1844–1907; Harriet "Hattie" Anne 1848–1868
Elvira Eliza Field; 1830–1910	m. July 13, 1849	19	36	Evaline 1853–1926; Charles James 1851–1916; Clement J. 1854–1944; James Jesse Jr. 1857–1934
Elizabeth "Betsy" McNutt (1820–1897)	m. January 19, 1852	31	38	Evangeline 1853–1915; David James 1854–1854; Gabriel 1855–1935; Abigail Utopa 1857–1921
Sarah Adelia "Delia" Wright; 1837–1923	m. July 15, 1855	17	42	James Phineas Strang 1856–1937
Phoebe Wright; 1836–1914	m. October 27, 1855	19	42	Eugenia Jesse 1856–1936

Mary
Elvira
Betsy
Sarah
Phoebe
│
1836
│
1838
│
1840
│
1842
│
1844
│
1846
│
1848
│
1850
│
1852
│
1854
│
1856
James Strang's marriages

Strang and his first wife Mary Perce separated in May 1851, though they remained legally married until Strang's death. His second wife, Elvira Eliza Field disguised herself at first as "Charlie J. Douglas", Strang's purported nephew, before revealing her true identity in 1850. Ironically, decades after Strang's death, Strang's fourth wife, Sarah Adelia Wright, divorced her second husband, Dr. Wing, due to Wing's interest in polygamy. Strang's last wife was Phoebe Wright, cousin to Sarah.

Sarah Wright described Strang as "a very mild-spoken, kind man to his family, although his word was law." She wrote that while each wife had her own bedroom, they shared meals and devotional time together with Strang and life in their household was "as pleasant as possible". On the other hand, Strang and Phoebe Wright's daughter, Eugenia, wrote in 1936 that after only eight months of marriage, her mother had "begun to feel dissatisfied with polygamy, though she loved him [Strang] devotedly all her life."

== Theology ==
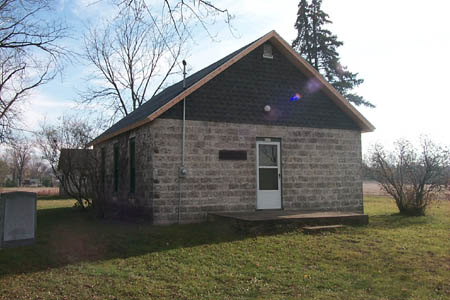
Strangite church building in Voree, Wisconsin (2005)

=== Publications ===
Like Joseph Smith, James Strang reported numerous visions, unearthed and translated allegedly ancient metal plates using what he said was the Biblical Urim and Thummim, and claimed to have restored long-lost spiritual knowledge to humankind. Like Smith, he presented witnesses to authenticate the records he claimed to have received. Unlike Smith, however, Strang offered his plates to the public for examination. The non-Mormon Christopher Sholes—inventor of the typewriter and editor of a local newspaper—perused Strang's "Voree Plates", a minuscule brass chronicle Strang said he had been led to by a vision in 1845. Sholes offered no opinion on Strang's find, but described the prophet as "honest and earnest" and opined that his followers ranked "among the most honest and intelligent men in the neighborhood". Strang published his translation of these plates as the "Voree Record", purporting to be the last testament of Rajah Manchou of Vorito, who had lived in the area centuries earlier and wished to leave a brief statement for posterity. The Voree Plates disappeared around 1900, and their current whereabouts are unknown.

Strang also claimed to have translated a portion of the "Plates of Laban" described in the Book of Mormon. This translation was published in 1851 as the Book of the Law of the Lord, said to be selected from the original Law given to Moses and mentioned in 2 Chronicles 34:14–15. Republished in 1856, expanded with inspired notes and commentary, this book served as the constitution for Strang's spiritual kingdom on Beaver Island, and is still accepted as scripture by Strangites. One distinctive feature (besides its overtly monarchial tone) is its restoration of a "missing" commandment to the Decalogue: "Thou shalt love thy neighbor as thyself." Strang insisted that versions of the Decalogue found in Bibles used by other churches—including other Latter Day Saint churches—contain only nine commandments, not ten.

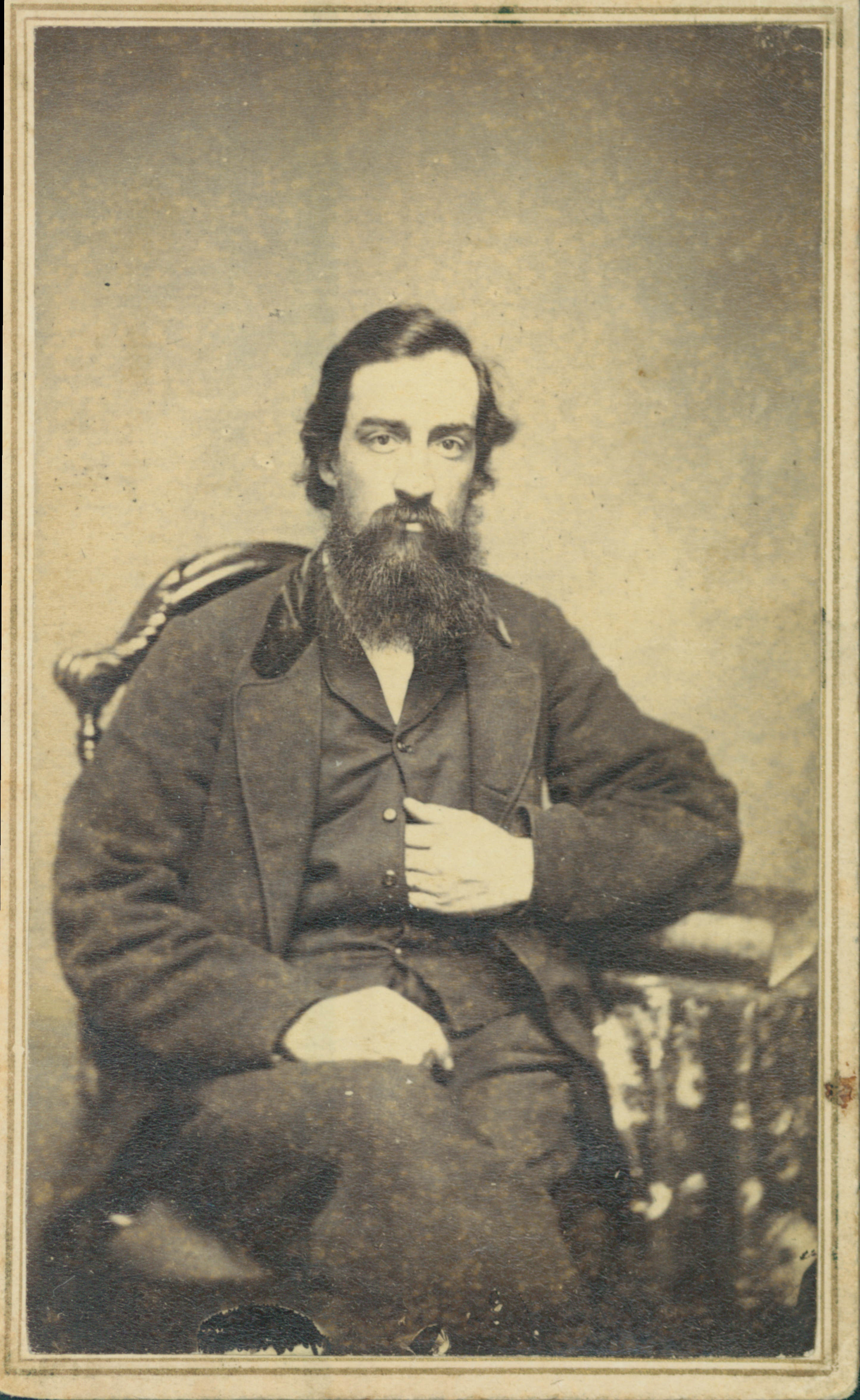
Joseph Smith III — Son of Joseph Smith. Rejected Strang; led the "Reorganized" church 1860–1914.

Strang received several other revelations, which while never formally added to his church's Doctrine and Covenants, are nevertheless accepted as scripture by his followers. These concerned, among other things, Baptism for the Dead, the building of a temple in Voree, the standing of Sidney Rigdon, and an invitation for Joseph Smith III, eldest son of Joseph Smith, to take a position as Counselor in Strang's First Presidency. "Young Joseph" never accepted this calling and refused to have anything to do with Strang's organization. Strang also authored The Diamond, an attack on the claims of Sidney Rigdon and Brigham Young, and The Prophetic Controversy, ostensibly for Mrs. Martha Coray, co-author with Lucy Mack Smith of The History of Joseph Smith by His Mother. Coray, a partisan of Brigham Young's, had challenged "the vain usurper" to provide convincing evidence of his claims, and Strang obliged in this open letter addressed to her. Coray's reaction has not been preserved.

=== Distinctive dogmas ===
Some of Strang's teachings differed substantially from those of other Latter Day Saint leaders, including Joseph Smith. For instance, Strang rejected the traditional Christian doctrines of the Trinity and the Virgin Birth of Jesus Christ, together with the Mormon doctrine of the "plurality of gods". A monotheist, he insisted that there was only one eternal God in all the universe, Father, and that "progression to godhood" (a doctrine allegedly taught by Joseph Smith toward the end of his life) was impossible. God had always been God, said Strang, and He was only one Person, not three persons, according to the doctrine of the traditional Christian Trinity. Jesus Christ was presented as the natural-born son of Mary and Joseph, who was chosen from before all time to be the Savior of mankind but he had to be born as an ordinary mortal from two human parents (rather than being the offspring of either the Father or the Holy Spirit) in order to fulfill his Messianic role. In essence, Strang claimed that the earthly Christ was "adopted" as God's son at birth, and he was fully revealed to be such during the Transfiguration. After proving himself to God by living a perfectly sinless life, he was enabled to provide an acceptable sacrifice for the sins of men, prior to his resurrection and ascension.

Furthermore, Strang denied the belief that God could do all things, and he insisted that some things were as impossible for Him as for us. Thus, he saw no essential conflict between science and religion, and while he never openly championed evolution, he did state that God's ability to use His power was limited by the matter which He was working with and it was also limited by the eons of time which were required to "organize" and shape it. Strang spoke glowingly about a future generation of people who would "make religion a science," to be "studied by as exact rules as mathematicks". "The mouth of the Seer will be opened," he prophesied, "and the whole earth enlightened".

Musing at length on the nature of sin and evil, Strang wrote that of all of the things that God could give to man, He could never give him experience. Thus, if "free agency" was real, said Strang, humanity must be given the opportunity to fail and learn from its own mistakes. The ultimate goal for each human being was to willingly conform oneself to the "revealed character" of God in every respect, preferring to do good rather than preferring to do evil not out of fear of punishment and not out of any desire for rewards, but preferring to do good solely "on account of the innate loveliness of undefiled goodness; of pure unalloyed holiness."

=== Practices ===
Strang strongly believed in the sanctity of the seventh-day Sabbath, and he enjoined it in lieu of Sunday; the Strangite church continues to observe this tradition. He advocated baptism for the dead, and practiced it to a limited extent in Voree as well as on Beaver Island. He also introduced animal sacrifice–not as atonement for sin, but as a part of Strangite celebration rituals. Animal sacrifices and baptisms for the dead are not currently practiced by the Strangite organization, but belief in each is still required by it. Strang attempted to construct a temple in Voree, but he was prevented from completing its construction due to the poverty and lack of cooperation which existed among his followers. No "endowment" rituals which are comparable to those in the Utah LDS and the Cutlerite churches appear to have existed among his followers. Eternal marriage formed a part of Strang's teaching, but he did not require it to be performed in a temple (as is the case in the LDS church). Thus, such marriages are still contracted in Strang's church in the absence of any Strangite temple or any "endowment" ceremony. Alcohol, tobacco, coffee and tea were all prohibited, just as they were in many other Latter Day Saint denominations. Polygamy is no longer practiced by Strang's followers, but belief in its correctness is still affirmed by them.

Strang allowed women to hold the Priesthood offices of Priest and Teacher, unique among all Latter Day Saint factions during his lifetime. He welcomed African Americans into his church, and he ordained at least two of them to its eldership. Strang also mandated the conservation of land and resources, requiring the building of parks and the retention of large forests in his kingdom. He wrote an eloquent refutation of the "Solomon Spalding theory" of the Book of Mormon's authorship, and defended the ministry and teachings of Joseph Smith.

== Coronation and troubled reign on Beaver Island ==
Strang claimed that he was required to occupy the office of king as it is described in the Book of the Law of the Lord. He insisted that this authority was incumbent upon all holders of the prophetic office from the beginning of time, in similar fashion to Smith, who was secretly crowned as "king" of the Kingdom of God before his murder. Strang was accordingly crowned in 1850 by his counselor and Prime Minister, George J. Adams. About 300 people witnessed his coronation, for which he wore a bright red flannel robe which was topped by a white collar with black speckles. His crown was made of tin, rather than gold, and it is described in one account as being "a shiny metal ring with a cluster of glass stars in the front". Strang also sported a breastplate and carried a wooden scepter. His reign lasted six years, and the date of his coronation, July 8, is still mandated as one of the two most important dates in the Strangite church year (the other being April 6, the anniversary of the founding of Joseph Smith's church).

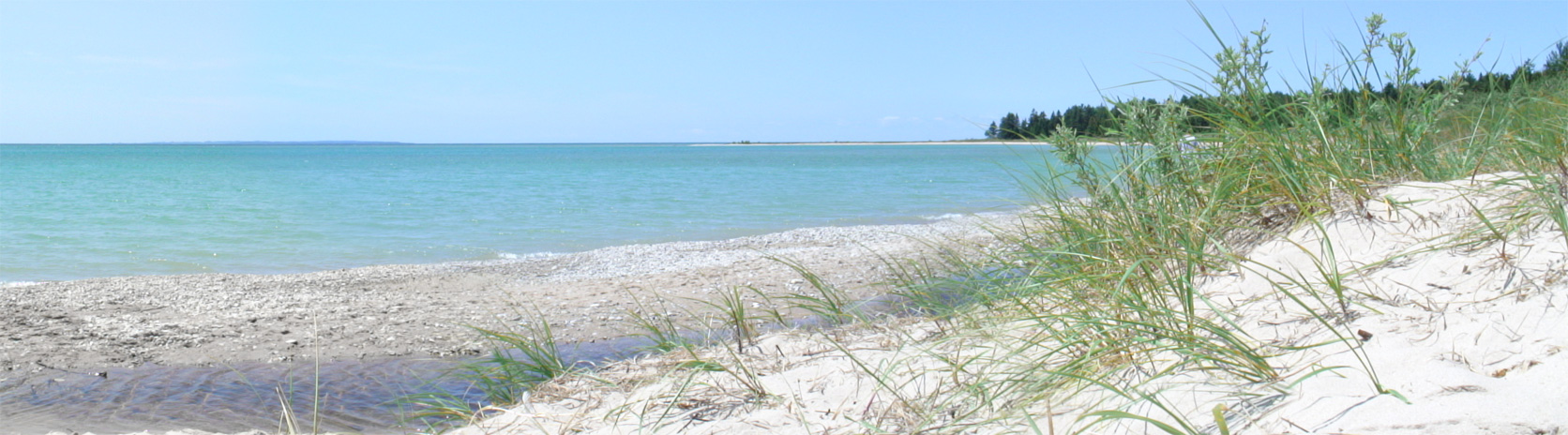
A view of Iron Ore Bay on the southern end of Beaver Island

Strang never claimed to be the king of Beaver Island itself, nor did he claim to be the king of any other geographical entity. Instead, he claimed to be king of his church, which he considered the true "Kingdom of God" which was prophesied in Scripture and destined to spread itself over all the earth. Nor did Strang ever say that his "kingdom" supplanted United States sovereignty over Beaver Island. However, since his sect was the main religious body on the isle, claiming the allegiance of most of its inhabitants, Strang often asserted his authority on Beaver, even over non-Strangites—a practice which ultimately caused him and his followers a great deal of grief. Furthermore, he and many of his disciples were accused of forcibly appropriating property and revenue on the island, a practice which earned him few friends among the non-Mormon "gentiles".

On the other hand, Strang and his people lived in apprehension of what their non-member neighbors might do next. Some Strangites were beaten up while they were going to the post office in order to collect their mail, and some of their homes were robbed and even seized by "gentiles" while Strangite men were away. On July 4, 1850, a drunken mob of fishermen vowed to kill the "Mormons" or drive them out, only to be awed into submission when Strang fired a cannon (which he had secretly acquired) at them. Competition for business and jobs added to tensions on the island, as did the increasing Strangite monopoly on local government, made sure after Beaver and adjacent islands were first attached to Emmet County in 1853, then later organized into their own insular county of Manitou in 1855.

As a result of his coronation, along with lurid tales which were being spread by George Adams (who had been excommunicated by Strang a few months after the ceremony), Strang was accused of treason, counterfeiting, trespassing on government land, and theft, along with other crimes. He was brought to trial in Detroit, Michigan, after President Millard Fillmore ordered US District Attorney George Bates to investigate the rumors about Strang and his colony. Strang's successful trial defense brought him considerable favorable press, which he used as leverage when he ran for, and won, a seat on the Michigan state legislature as a Democrat in 1853. Facing a determined effort to deny him this seat due to the hostility of his enemies, he was permitted to address the legislature in his defense, after which the Michigan House of Representatives voted twice (first unanimously, then a second time by a 49–11 margin) to allow "King Strang" to join them.

In the 1853 legislative session, Strang introduced ten bills, five of which passed. The Detroit Advertiser, on February 10, 1853, wrote of Strang: "Mr. Strang's course as a member of the present Legislature, has disarmed much of the prejudices which have previously surrounded him. Whatever may be said or thought of the peculiar sect of which he is the local head, I take pleasure in stating that throughout this session he has conducted himself with the degree of decorum and propriety which have been equaled by his industry, sagacity, good temper, apparent regard for the true interests of the people, and the obligations of his official oath." He was reelected in 1855, and did much to organize the upper portion of Michigan's lower peninsula into counties and townships. Strang ardently fought the illegal practice of trading liquor to local Native American tribes due to the common practice of selling them diluted liquor mixed with various contaminants at a high price. This made him many enemies among those non-Strangite residents of Beaver and nearby Mackinac Island who profited mightily from this illicit trade.

== Assassination ==
James Strang had problems with excommunicated or disaffected members who often became anti-Mormons and/or even conspired against him. One of the latter, Thomas Bedford, who had been flogged for engaging in adultery with another member's wife, blamed Strang for the flogging and sought revenge. Another, Hezekiah D. McCulloch, had been excommunicated for drunkenness and other alleged misdeeds, after previously enjoying Strang's favor and several high offices in local government. These men conspired against Strang along with the Mormons' enemies who were living in Mackinac, two of whom were Alexander Wentworth and Dr. J. Atkyn. Pistols were procured, and the four conspirators began several days of target practice while they finalized the details of their murderous plan.

Although Strang apparently knew that Bedford and the others were gunning for him, he openly challenged them in his newspaper, The Northern Islander, writing, "We laugh with bitter scorn at all these threats," just days before his murder. Strang refused to employ a bodyguard or carry a firearm or any other type of weapon.

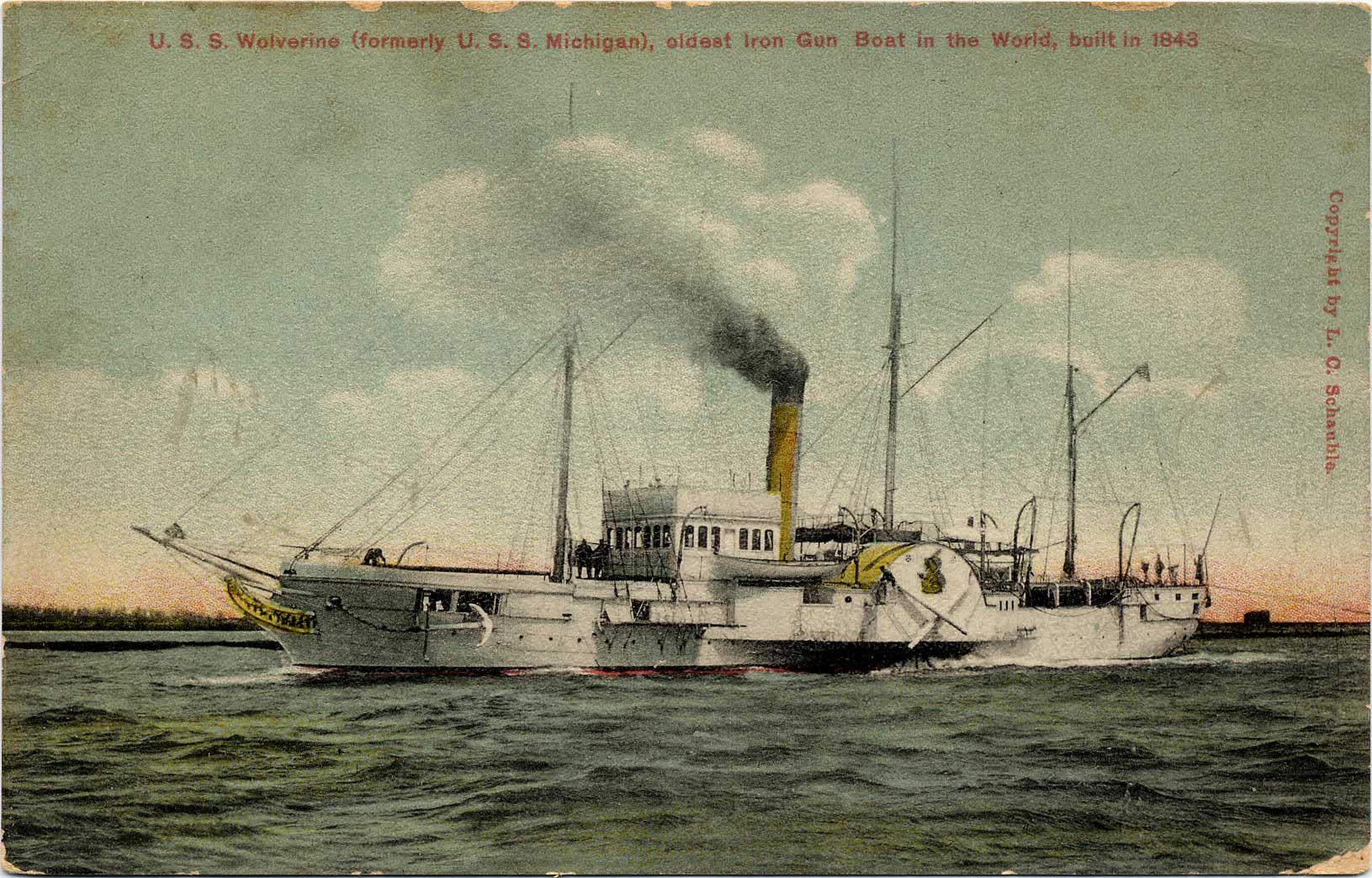
The USS Michigan later in her career

On Monday, June 16, 1856, Strang was waylaid around 7:00 p.m. on the dock at the harbor of St. James, the chief city on Beaver Island, by Wentworth and Bedford, who shot him in the back.

Strang was hit three times: one bullet grazed his head, another bullet lodged in his cheek and a third bullet lodged in his spine, paralyzing him from the waist down. One of the assassins then pistol-whipped the victim before running aboard the nearby vessel with his companion, where both claimed sanctuary. Some accused Captain Charles H. McBlair of the USS Michigan of being complicit in, or at least of having foreknowledge of, the assassination plot, though no hard evidence to support their accusation was ever forthcoming. The "King of Beaver Island" was taken to Voree, where he lived for three weeks, dying on July 9, 1856, at the age of 43. After refusing to deliver Bedford and Wentworth to the local Sheriff of Mackinac County, Julius Granger, McBlair transported them to Mackinac Island. Once on the island Sheriff Granger first held them in an unlocked jail cell at the 'urging' of the citizenry and then moved to a boarding house he was keeping, Grove House. Three days later they were given a 'mock trial' where the justice charged them $1.25 a piece for court costs, then released them where they were feted by the local citizenry. None of those involved, including McCulloch and Atkyn, received punishment for their alleged crimes; Wentworth lived until 1863 and Bedford died in 1889.

== Death of a kingdom ==
While Strang lingered on his deathbed in Voree, his enemies in Michigan were determined to extinguish his Beaver Island kingdom. On July 5, 1856, on what Michigan historian Byron M. Cutcheon later called "the most disgraceful day in Michigan's history", a group of non-Mormons from Mackinac and elsewhere forcibly evicted every Strangite from Beaver Island. Strang's subjects on the island—approximately 2,600 persons—were herded onto hastily commandeered steamers, most after being robbed of their money and other personal possessions, and unceremoniously dumped onto docks along the shores of Lake Michigan. A few of them moved back to Voree, while the rest scattered across the country.

Strang refused to appoint a successor, telling his apostles to take care of their families as best they could, and await divine instruction. While his supporters endeavored to keep his church alive, Strang's unique dogma which required his successor to be ordained by angels made his church unappealing to Latter Day Saints who were expecting to be led by a prophet. Lorenzo Dow Hickey, the last of Strang's apostles, emerged as an ad-hoc leader until his death in 1897, followed by Wingfield W. Watson, a High Priest in Strang's organization (until he died in 1922). However, neither of these men ever claimed Strang's office or authority. (Note: No apostles currently remain in Strang's organization, because all Strangite apostles must be appointed by revelation. The highest current office in Strang's church is that of High Priest (in the "incorporated" faction) or that of Elder (in the other).)

Left without a prophet to guide them, most of Strang's followers (including all of his wives) departed from his church in the years after his murder. Most of them later joined the Reorganized Church of Jesus Christ of Latter Day Saints, which was established in 1860. (Note: This organization is now called the Community of Christ. It remains the second-largest church in the Latter Day Saint movement.) However, a few Latter Day Saints continue to carry on Strang's mission. Strang's last and most important revelation, The Book of the Law of the Lord states that a prophet president is "...only necessary for the establishment of the rest of God, and bringing everlasting righteousness on earth. A lesser degree of the Priesthood has frequently stood at the head of the people of God on earth" (p. 251). Consequently, instead of believing that Strang's demise and his refusal to appoint a successor are failures, they believe that they are maintaining the pure faith and awaiting the appearance of a new successor who will take the place of their fallen founders. They believe that their position is bolstered by revelations which were given by Smith and Strang in which they stated that the condemnation of the church is prophetic and a sign of general apostasy.

Today, there are several groups and individual Strangite disciples who operate autonomously. One of these groups is a corporate church which is led by a Presiding High Priest, Bill Shepard, who claims that he does not have Joseph Smith or James Strang's authority or priesthood office. Another group, which is led by Samuel West, claims that the first faction is in error, and it also claims that by incorporating in 1961, it lost its identity as a faithful continuation of Strang's organization. This second group claims that it is the sole true remnant of James Strang's church. (Note: The corporate church has a website: http://www.ldsstrangite.com/; "unincorporated" Strangites have three websites: http://www.strangite.org and http://mormonbeliefs.com and http://www.strangite.blogspot.com.) Missionary work is no longer emphasized by Strangites (as it is by the LDS and many other Latter Day Saint sects), because they tend to believe that after the murder of three prophets (Joseph Smith, Hyrum Smith and James Strang) God closed His dispensation to the "gentiles" of the West. Consequently, Strang's church has continued to dwindle until the present day. The current membership of the corporate church comprises around 300 persons, while the Samuel West group claims to have several thousand members in the US and Africa.

While proving to be a key player in the 1844 succession struggle, Strang's long-term influence on the Latter Day Saint movement was minimal. His doctrinal innovations had little impact outside his church, and he was largely ignored until recent historians began to reexamine his life and career. Even the county (Manitou) which he had fought to establish was abolished by the Michigan legislature in 1895, removing the last tangible remnant of Strang's temporal empire. Of all of his efforts, Strang's most vital (albeit unintended) one was his contribution to the Latter Day Saint religion which turned out to provide some of the impetus behind the creation of the Reorganized Church, which became a major rival of the Utah-based LDS Church and other Latter Day Saint groups—including his own.

== Selected works ==
- Strang, Mark, ed. (1961). The Diary of James J. Strang: Deciphered, Transcribed, Introduced, and Annotated. East Lansing: Michigan State University Press.
- Strang, James J. (1854a, Reprinted 2005). Ancient and modern Michilimackinac, including an account of the controversy between Mackinac and the Mormons. Reprint by the University of Michigan Library. Retrieved on 2007-10-28.
- Strang, James J. (1848). The Diamond: Being the Law of Prophetic Succession and a Defense of the Calling of James J. Strang as Successor to Joseph Smith. Voree, Wisconsin. Retrieved on 2007-11-03.
- Strang, James J. (1854b). The Prophetic Controversy: A Letter from James Strang to Mrs. Corey. St. James, Michigan. Retrieved on 2007-10-28.
- Strang, James J. (1856). Book of the Law of the Lord, Being a Translation From the Egyptian of the Law Given to Moses in Sinai. St. James: Royal Press. Retrieved on 2007-10-28.

== See also ==
- List of homicides in Michigan
- List of assassinated American politicians
- Emperor Norton

== Further references ==
- Beshears, Kyle (Spring–Summer 2023). "'In Love and Union': The Writings of Mr. Charles J. Douglass, Secret Plural Wife of a Mormon King". John Whitmer Historical Association. 43 (1): 41–54.
- Blythe, Christopher James (June 2014). "The Coronation of James J. Strang and the Making of Beaver Island Mormonism". Communal Societies: Journal of the Communal Studies Association. 34 (1) – via Gale Academic OneFile.
- DeRogatis, Amy (Spring–Summer 2023). "Intimate Exposure: The Charley Douglass Daguerreotype and American Religious History". John Whitmer Historical Association Journal. 43 (1): 20–40.
- Faber, Don (2016). James Jesse Strang: The Rise and Fall of Michigan's Mormon King. University of Michigan Press. doi:10.3998/mpub.6963838. ISBN 9780472052899.
- Foster, Lawrence (June 1981). "James J. Strang: The Prophet Who Failed". Church History: Studies in Christianity and Culture. 50 (2): 182–192. doi:10.2307/3166882. JSTOR 3166882. S2CID 162192346.
- Harvey, Miles (2020). The King of Confidence: A Tale of Utopian Dreamers, Frontier Schemers, True Believers, False Prophets, and the Murder of an American Monarch. Little, Brown and Company. ISBN 978-0316463591.
- Jensen, Robin Scott (2007). "Mormons Seeking Mormonism: Strangite Success and the Conceptualization of Mormon Ideology, 1844–50". In Bringhurst, Newell G.; Hamer, John C. (eds.). Scattering of the Saints: Schism Within Mormonism. John Whitmer Books. ISBN 9781934901021.
- Quist, John (1989). "Polygamy Among James Strang and His Followers". John Whitmer Historical Association Journal. 9: 31–48. JSTOR 43200832.
- Silitto, John and Staker, Susan (eds.). (2002). Mormon Mavericks: Essays on Dissenters. Signature Books. ISBN 1-56085-154-6.
- van Noord, Roger (1988). King of Beaver Island: The Life and Assassination of James Jesse Strang. University of Illinois Press. ISBN 0-252-01472-3.
- van Noord, Roger (1997). Assassination of a Michigan King: The Life of James Jesse Strang. University of Michigan Press. ISBN 9780472084548.

Religious titles
Preceded by Joseph Smith	President of the Church of Jesus Christ of Latter Day Saints (Strangite); June 1844 – July 9, 1856	No successor to date
Political offices
Preceded by	Member of the Michigan House of Representatives; 1853 – July 9, 1856	Succeeded by
