= History of the Church of Jesus Christ (Bickertonite) =

The Church of Jesus Christ (Bickertonite) is part of the Latter Day Saint movement. Upon the death of Joseph Smith, the founder of the movement, there was a dispute regarding who should lead the church as his successor. The Quorum of the Twelve, led by Brigham Young, argued that they should have the right to lead the church while the First Counselor of the First Presidency, Sidney Rigdon, argued that he should act as protector of the church until a permanent leader was chosen. Those who followed Rigdon formed the "Church of Christ" centered in Pittsburgh, Pennsylvania. After an attempt to start a communitarian society, Church of Christ broke apart by 1847. William Bickerton, an apostle in Rigdon's church, associated himself with the Church of Jesus Christ of Latter-day Saints (LDS Church) for two years, and later broke with LDS Church after the official announcement of the practice of polygamy. In the 1850s, Bickerton's preaching led to the formation of a new church in Eastern Pennsylvania. Over the following years Bickerton's church faced two schisms related to doctrinal issues. Its current official name, the Church of Jesus Christ, was adopted by 1941. The growth of the church has continued to the present day, and it is now the third largest church that traces its lineage to Joseph Smith.

== History ==
=== Leadership of Joseph Smith (1829–1844) ===
The Church of Jesus Christ claims to be a continuation of the Church of Christ, which was the original church organization legally organized by Joseph Smith on April 6, 1830 in northwestern New York state. Soon after this formal organization, small branches were formally established in Fayette, Manchester, and Colesville.

Smith and his associates intended that the Church of Christ would be a restoration of the 1st century Christian church, which Smith taught had fallen from God's favor and authority because of a Great Apostasy.

In late 1830, Smith envisioned a "city of Zion" in Native American lands near Independence, Missouri. In October 1830 he sent his second-in-command Oliver Cowdery and others on a mission to the area. Passing through Kirtland, Ohio, the missionaries converted a congregation of Disciples of Christ led by Sidney Rigdon, and in 1831, Smith decided to temporarily move his followers to Kirtland until the Missouri area could be colonized. The church headquarters remained in Kirtland from 1831 to 1838.

Many of Smith's followers attempted to colonize Missouri throughout the 1830s, and Smith himself moved there in 1838, the church faced political and military opposition by other Missouri settlers. After a series of crises, the church then established its new headquarters in Nauvoo, Illinois, a city they built on drained swampland by the Mississippi River, where Joseph Smith served as mayor. There, the church thrived until Smith and his brother Hyrum were killed by a mob in 1844. They were awaiting trial for crimes related to the destruction of the printing press of the Nauvoo Expositor. At the time, Joseph Smith was a minor candidate for President of the United States with Sidney Rigdon as his running mate. Before his death, Smith also began teaching doctrines that were rejected by the later church, particularly plural marriage.

=== First transition of leadership ===
When Joseph Smith was killed in 1844, there was confusion about who should succeed him in leading the church. Many of the leaders of the church were absent from Nauvoo at the time of his death, serving as missionaries or working on Joseph Smith's presidential campaign. Sidney Rigdon was in Pittsburgh, Pennsylvania when he heard of Smith's death, and hurried back to Nauvoo, becoming one of the first church leaders to return. As Joseph Smith’s First Counselor in the First Presidency of the church, Rigdon felt that he had the responsibility to lead as its "guardian" until proper proceedings could decide the next church president, and that the Quorum of the Twelve did not have the right to lead the church. Rigdon had been ordained by Joseph Smith as a "Prophet, Seer and Revelator" — which were some of the same ecclesiastical titles held by Smith.

The Quorum of Twelve Apostles, led by Brigham Young, also claimed the right to lead the church. The Quorum of the Twelve's claim was derived from a revelation of Joseph Smith allowing them to stand equal to the First Presidency in attending to matters of the church not of a spiritual nature. Many individuals later claimed to have heard Joseph Smith say if Brigham Young ever got control of the church he would run it to the devil. The most notable of these individuals was Joseph Smith's own brother, William Smith.

The Church of Jesus Christ maintains that the First Presidency had made nearly all the major decisions and led the Church of Christ prior to Smith's death, and as first counselor to Smith, Rigdon should naturally have been the leader of the church after Smith's death. With this understanding, The Church of Jesus Christ actively opposes the opinion that the Quorum of Twelve had the right to lead the church. The position of The Church of Jesus Christ is that Rigdon should have been allowed to be what he claimed to be—a "guardian" over the church until proper proceedings could decide the next church president. The Church of Jesus Christ maintains that the proceedings which authorized Brigham Young to lead the church were a violation of proper proceedings of the church.

=== Leadership of Sidney Rigdon (1844–1847) ===
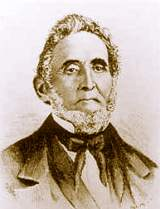
Sidney Rigdon

The Latter Day Saints who followed Rigdon separated themselves from the followers of Young. While the group led by Young remained in Nauvoo, Illinois and eventually settled in Utah Territory, Rigdon and his followers settled in Pittsburgh, Pennsylvania. On April 6, 1845, Rigdon presided over a conference of the Church of Christ, which he claimed was the rightful continuation of the church founded by Smith. (Historians often refer to Rigdon's church as the Church of Christ (Rigdonite) and its adherents as Rigdonites, Pennsylvania Latter Day Saints, or Pennsylvania Mormons.") William Bickerton was among those converted by Rigdon's preaching, and was baptized at Pittsburgh in 1845. Later that same year Bickerton was ordained an elder and shortly after an evangelist in the church.

=== Second transition of leadership ===
At a general conference of the church held that fall in Philadelphia, Rigdon announced that the church would re-establish a communitarian society on what was named "Adventure Farm" near Greencastle, Pennsylvania. Many of Rigdon's followers, including Bickerton, opposed moving the headquarters of the church. By 1847, disagreement among the members had led to the virtual disintegration of Rigdon's church, and Bickerton claimed that the Rigdonite organization had fallen away. Several prominent members, including William E. M'Lellin and Benjamin Winchester, separated from Rigdon's church and established another organization centered around the leadership of David Whitmer. However, some followers of Rigdon, including Bickerton, refused to join this group of dissenters.

Bickerton remained in Monongahela, Pennsylvania, and never moved to Greencastle with Rigdon. By April 1847, the Adventure Farm community had collapsed and Rigdon had abandoned his followers.

Having a strong conviction in the beliefs he had gained, but left without an organization, Bickerton associated with two elders of the Church of Jesus Christ of Latter-day Saints (LDS Church) in Elizabeth, Pennsylvania from March 1851 to March 1852. Bickerton acted as Presiding Elder of this Latter Day Saint church in West Elizabeth, Pennsylvania. In 1852, representatives of LDS Church president Brigham Young visited Bickerton and informed him that he must teach plural marriage. Bickerton replied, "If the approval of God were to come to me by accepting the doctrine of polygamy, I prefer the displeasure of God." Bickerton disassociated himself from the LDS Church because of its adherence to doctrines that he felt could not be substantiated in the Bible or the Book of Mormon, particularly plural marriage.

On March 10, 1852, Members of the West Elizabeth branch of the Latter Day Saint group led by Bickerton published the following statement:

We, the undersigned, have left off all connection whatsoever with Brigham Young and the twelve whose headquarters or home is in the Valley of the Great Salt Lake — because of their adultery and general wickedness.

=== Leadership of William Bickerton (1847–1880) ===
William Bickerton

In a pamphlet published in Pittsburgh in 1863, Bickerton described his situation after the collapse of the Rigdonite church and his departure from the Utah church:

... The Church [had become] disorganized. Here I was left to myself. I paused to know what course to pursue. I knew my calling was from Heaven, and I also knew that a man cannot build up the Church of Christ without divine commandment from the Lord, for it would only be sectarianism, and man's authority. But the Lord did not leave me; no, he showed me a vision, and in the vision I was on the highest mountain on the earth; and he told me that if I did not preach the gospel I would fall into a dreadful chasm below, the sight thereof was awful. I moved with fear, having the Holy Spirit with me. Here I was, none to assist me, and without learning, popular opinion against me, and the Salt Lake Mormons stood in the way. I could not turn back unto Methodism again. No, I knew they had not the gospel. I stood in contemplation. The chasm was before me, no other alternative but to do my duty to God and man. I went ahead preaching repentance towards God, and faith in the Lord Jesus Christ. Some believed my testimony and were baptized, and we met together [and] the Lord met with us ....

Bickerton continued to preach and by May 1851 a branch of the church was organized under Bickerton's leadership in West Elizabeth, Pennsylvania. Other ministers were ordained and branches were established in Allegheny, Rock Run, Green Oak, and Pine Run, Pennsylvania, as well as Wheeling, West Virginia. The church believes that William Bickerton was used to restore the purity of the church that arose due to "difficulties" in the restoration, specifically doctrines that they believe are not taught from the Book of Mormon or the Bible

Many visitors inquired of this organization's position concerning Latter-day Saints who followed Brigham Young. The following statement was officially recorded in 1855:

As some individuals have been inclining to the people of Salt Lake and their doctrines, we have felt it our duty while sitting in Council before the Lord, that all who hold such doctrines, after due examination before witnesses, shall be cut off from the Church of Jesus Christ of Latter Day Saints, as the spirit may direct and shall have no fellowship with the Saints.

At a conference on July 9, 1861, it was recorded that twelve of their number were chosen and called by the Holy Spirit to be apostles, and it was recorded that the word of the Lord had declared,

...yet once again I have raised up another like unto Joseph, to lead forth my people; him shall ye hear in all things. I decreed that I would set up an ensign, and raise up a standard. That ensign has been lifted, that standard raised, and now I have called forth my servant William Bickerton to lead forth my people, and they shall go in and out and find pasture, and the world shall know that there is a God in heaven...

At a conference in Green Oak (also known as Greenock), Pennsylvania in July 1862, leaders of several branches in Pennsylvania, Ohio and Virginia came together and formally organized "The Church of Jesus Christ". Bickerton presided over the conference. Bickerton's two counselors in the newly organized First Presidency were George Barnes and Charles Brown, who were ordained apostles. A Quorum of Twelve Apostles of that organization was also ordained. Those called to the Twelve (ordered by seniority) were Arthur Bickerton, Thomas Bickerton, Alexander Bickerton, James Brown, Cummings Cherry, Benjamin Meadowcroft, Joseph Astin, Joseph Knox, William Cadman, James Nichols, John Neish and John Dixon.

At a conference in 1863, a revelation was recorded that stated,

...William Bickerton shall be called a seer, a translator, a prophet, an apostle of Jesus Christ, an elder of the church, through the will of God and the grace of your Lord Jesus Christ; and also it was felt to be the will of God that the two counselors, Charles Brown and George Barnes, should have the same calling laid upon them...

The church was incorporated in Pittsburgh, Pennsylvania in June 1865 with the legal name, "Church of Jesus Christ of Green Oak, Pennsylvania."

The church quickly produced a translation of the Book of Mormon in Italian, and a significant amount of the church's early growth during the 1870s took place among Italian American immigrants in Philadelphia. People of Italian heritage have remained a significant element of the church's membership since that time.

In 1874, the church appointed a committee aimed at achieving a gathering of the church among the Native Americans. The following year Bickerton accompanied by approximately thirty-five to forty families moved to Kansas to found the Zion Valley Colony, which later became the town of St. John, Kansas. After dedicating Zion Valley, Bickerton encouraged the saints to migrate there. Shortly after their arrival, Bickerton and his followers erected a church, "about 40x70 feet", which nonmembers called the "Mormon temple". However, the community of Zion Valley did not last due to dissension among the members, and "a few years later the temple was sold to Swartz Bros. who converted it into a hardware and drug store." The saints who remained in Pennsylvania pledged to support the missionaries as best they could.

=== Third transition of leadership ===
As the church began to grow in the East, membership sought to establish missionary work with the Native Americans. In 1874 the church appointed a committee to establish a church in Stafford County, Kansas. The following year William Bickerton dedicated land now known as St. John, Kansas. At the time it was named "Zion Valley". Membership was encouraged to move and remaining members to support the mission financially. During this time, division in the church grew between east and west. William Cadman was elected president of the church in the east in 1880, while Bickerton remained president over the members in the west because of the geographical differences. At the time, there were ten missions in the east and Zion Valley in the west.

In 1880, the church faced a serious crisis when charges of adultery were brought against Bickerton by another member of the church in Kansas. Although Bickerton maintained his innocence, a church council decision went against him and he was disfellowshipped from the church. He was later exonerated of the charges in court and reinstated in the church in 1902. Bickerton remained a church member until he died in January 1905.

In 1887, at the final General Church Conference to be held in Kansas, the church headquarters was moved back to Pennsylvania, where it has been ever since. By 1904, Cadman was the only surviving member of the Quorum of Twelve Apostles. The Quorum was filled once again at a conference held that July. The following year Cadman died.

=== Dissent and schism (1907–1914) ===
At the conference of the church in 1907, apostle Allen Wright distributed a pamphlet that expressed a dissenting opinion on the Second Coming of Jesus and the nature of Christ's millennial reign on earth. The conference condemned the publication and passed a resolution that suspended any member who believed Wright's ideas. Wright and five other members of the Quorum of Twelve Apostles refused to sustain the administrative action of the conference and subsequently were removed from office and excommunicated. In 1914, another schism occurred in the main church, this one led by James Caldwell, an evangelist in the church. Caldwell's groups opposed The Church of Jesus Christ's continued use of the quorum of the First Presidency, which they claimed was an alien institution to the true Church of Jesus Christ. Caldwell and his followers named their church the Primitive Church of Jesus Christ. Eventually, the Primitive Church of Jesus Christ merged with the Reorganized Church of Jesus Christ, and the combined organization survived into the 1970s. In 1971, The Church of Jesus Christ absorbed the First Presidency, which they call the quorum of three, into the Quorum of Twelve.

=== Adoption of official name ===
On 5 April 1941, the church in Pennsylvania was granted the title of "The Church of Jesus Christ" by Washington County, Pennsylvania. The church today is legally registered as "The Church of Jesus Christ" in the corporate registry of the state of Pennsylvania.
