= Primitive Church of Jesus Christ =

Primitive Church of Jesus Christ may refer to:

- Primitive Church of Jesus Christ (Bickertonite), a schismatic sect that separated from the Church of Jesus Christ (Bickertonite) in 1914
- The body of followers of Jesus in early Christianity; many Christians maintain that Jesus established a "church", and this church is often referred to as the "primitive" church

== See also ==
- Church of Jesus Christ
- Primitive Baptists
