= Stephen Post =

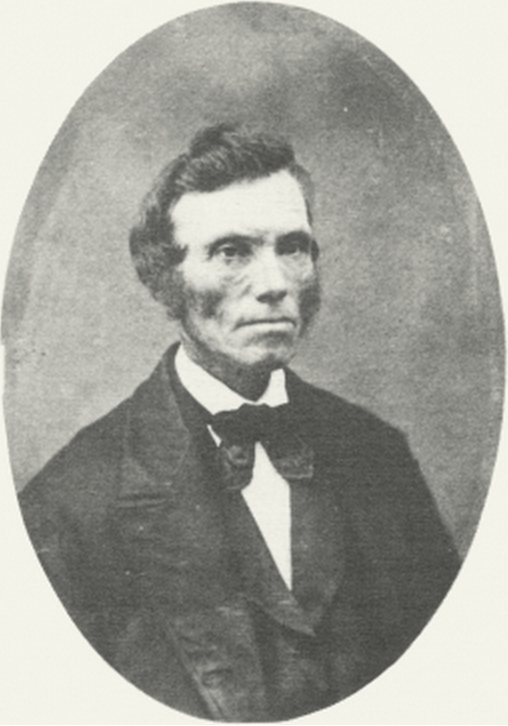

President of the Rigdonite Church of Jesus Christ
- July 1876 – December 18, 1879
- Predecessor: Sidney Rigdon
- Successor: Andrew J. Hinkle

Personal details
- Born: January 3, 1810; Greenwich, New York, U.S.
- Died: December 18, 1879 (aged 69); Woodmore, Manitoba Canada
- Spouse(s): Jane Post
- Children: 2

Stephen Post (January 3, 1810 – December 18, 1879) was an early member of the Latter Day Saint movement who became President of Sidney Rigdon's Rigdonite church (formerly the Church of Jesus Christ of the Children of Zion) after Rigdon's death in 1876.

Post converted to Joseph Smith's Church of the Latter Day Saints in Pennsylvania in 1835, and obtained his license to preach in Kirtland, Ohio, in 1836, becoming a member of the Second Quorum of the Seventy. By July 1837, he estimated that he had "traveled 544 miles and preached forty-three sermons." After Smith's martyrdom in 1844 precipitated a succession crisis in the church, Post initially demurred from affiliating with any of the resulting sects, instead continuing to preach as an independent believer. In 1850, he briefly joined James Strang's Church of Jesus Christ of Latter Day Saints, within which his younger brother Warren became an apostle, but he soon became disenchanted with Strang's practice of plural marriage and left the church.

In January 1856, Post wrote to Sidney Rigdon, Smith's former counselor, about the disordered state of Mormonism. Rigdon had briefly led his own church following Smith's martyrdom, but it had collapsed in 1848. In March, Rigdon responded to Post's letter with a revelation commanding him to assist in reestablishing the Rigdonite organization. Post eagerly embraced Rigdon's prophetic claims and became an able advocate of his cause, with an 1866 revelation designating him Rigdon's "spokesman." Post's non-Mormon wife, Jane, converted to the Rigdonite church in 1865 and was ordained an elder in 1868.

In 1871, Post was sent on a mission to Manitoba, Canada, where he spent the rest of his life. After Rigdon's death in July 1876, Post succeeded him as leader of the church, but died three years later after an extended illness. He was succeeded in 1880 by Andrew J. Hinkle, the son of early Mormon schismatic George M. Hinkle. However, Hinkle soon became a believer in Joseph Smith III's Reorganized Church of Jesus Christ of Latter Day Saints, and the few remaining Rigdonites replaced him as President of the Church with Post's widow Jane in February 1882. Shortly after the death of "Mother Post," the Rigdonite organization permanently disbanded.

== See also ==
- William Bickerton

== Notes ==
Church of Jesus Christ of the Children of Zion titles
Preceded by Sidney Rigdon	President of the Church; July 1876–December 18, 1879	Succeeded by Andrew J. Hinkle
