= Church of Jesus Christ =

Church of Jesus Christ may refer to:

- Christian Church, the body of all persons that share faith based in Christianity
- Church of Jesus Christ–Christian, a white-supremacist church founded by Ku Klux Klan organizer Wesley A. Swift
- Church of Jesus Christ at Armageddon, commonly known as the Love Family, a communal church founded in 1968 by Love Israel
- Church of Jesus Christ in Madagascar, the national church of Madagascar and the country's second-largest Christian denomination
- Church of Jesus Christ, known as Harshmanites, a small pacifist church in Illinois with Methodist origins
- A number of churches with a shared heritage in the Latter Day Saint movement:
  - Church of Christ (Latter Day Saints), the original Latter Day Saint church which for a short period of time was called "The Church of Jesus Christ"
  - The Church of Jesus Christ of Latter-day Saints (LDS Church) the largest denomination within the Latter Day Saint movement
  - Church of Jesus Christ (Cutlerite), a church consisting of a single branch in Independence, Missouri
  - Church of Jesus Christ (Drewite), a church founded in 1965 by Theron Drew as a schism from the Church of Jesus Christ of Latter Day Saints (Strangite)
  - Church of Jesus Christ (Original Doctrine) Inc., a Bountiful, British Columbia FLDS Church-offshoot based on the teachings of Winston Blackmore, who split with the FLDS Church after concluding that Warren Jeffs, had exceeded his authority and become too dictatorial.
  - Church of Jesus Christ (Zion's Branch), a Missouri church founded in 1986 by former members of the Reorganized Church of Jesus Christ of Latter Day Saints
  - Church of Jesus Christ of the Children of Zion, a short-lived denomination of Rigdonites, founded in 1845 and dissolved by 1847
  - Church of Jesus Christ Restored 1830, a church founded in the mid-1980s by dissenting members of the Reorganized Church of Jesus Christ of Latter Day Saints
  - Church of Jesus Christ, the Bride, the Lamb's Wife, a church founded in 1842 by George M. Hinkle and other excommunicated Latter Day Saints
  - Holy Church of Jesus Christ, a church founded in 1964 by Alexandre Caffiaux as a schism from the Church of Jesus Christ of Latter Day Saints (Strangite)
  - Primitive Church of Jesus Christ (Bickertonite), a church that was formed in 1914 by dissenters from the Church of Jesus Christ (Bickertonite)
  - Reorganized Church of Jesus Christ (Bickertonite), a church that was formed in 1907 by dissenters from the Church of Jesus Christ (Bickertonite)
  - Restoration Church of Jesus Christ (Gay Mormon Church), a church formed in 1985 by Antonio A. Feliz and other LGBT Latter Day Saints
  - Restored Church of Jesus Christ, a church founded in 1980 by Eugene O. Walton and based in Independence, Missouri
  - The Church of Jesus Christ (Bickertonite), an international church headquartered in Monongahela, Pennsylvania
  - True Church of Jesus Christ (Cutlerite), a now-defunct Cutlerite sect that existed from 1853 to 1869, based in Clitherall, Minnesota.

== See also ==
- Chiesa del Gesù, Alcamo, a Roman Catholic church in Alcamo, Sicily whose name translates to "Church of Jesus"
- Church of Christ (disambiguation)
