= Jesse Gause =

Early leader in the Latter Day Saint movement

First Counselor in First Presidency
- March 8, 1832 – December 3, 1832
- Called by: Joseph Smith
- End reason: Excommunicated

Personal details
- Born: 1785; East Marlborough, Pennsylvania, United States
- Died: c. 1836 (aged 50–51) unknown
- Spouse(s): Martha Johnson; Minerva Eliza Byram
- Children: At least 4
- Parents: William Gause; Mary Beverly

Jesse Gause (1785 – c. 1836) was an early leader in the Latter Day Saint movement and served in the presidency of the high priesthood, which later would become the First Presidency, as a counselor to church founder Joseph Smith. For decades Gause was generally unknown to Latter Day Saint historians. It was only in the 1970s and 80s that research identified his rightful place among early church leaders.

== Quaker and Shaker years ==
The son of William Gause and Mary Beverly, Gause was born in 1785 in East Marlborough, Chester County, Pennsylvania. Gause followed the faith of his parents and in 1806, apparently still single at twenty-one, he requested and was received into the Society of Friends, becoming a Quaker.

Although a Quaker in good standing, Gause's Quaker pacificism did not prevent him from joining the Delaware militia in 1814 during the War of 1812. Upon leaving the military in 1815 he moved to Wilmington, where he married Martha Johnson. In 1822, the family finally settled in Chester County where he became a teacher in a Quaker school. Martha died in 1828 after the birth of their fourth child.

Gause resigned from the Quakers on January 30, 1829, and joined the Shakers. In August 1830, Gause married Minerva Eliza Byram. They settled in Hancock, Massachusetts. Gause's new wife followed him, apparently accepting the Shaker practice of sexual abstinence even for married couples. In 1831, Gause, his wife, and infant son moved to the Shaker community near North Union, Ohio, leaving Martha's four children in the care of his sister, who was also a Shaker.

== Latter Day Saint years ==
At the same time that Gause was moving to North Union, Latter Day Saints from New York were also emigrating to Ohio, settling in the environs of Kirtland, some fifteen miles east of North Union. It is not known when Gause came into contact with these new settlers, but some time after October 1831 he was baptized; this time his wife refused to follow him. Gause rose quickly to a position of prominence in his new faith; in an early record book it states that on March 8, 1832, Joseph Smith "[c]hose this day and ordained brother Jesse Gause and Broth[er] Sidney [Rigdon] to be my counsellors of the ministry of the presidency of the High Priesthood". A week later, Smith said he received a revelation concerning Gause's selection as a counselor in what later became known as the First Presidency, as well as giving him additional instructions concerning his new assignment. Smith may have chosen a recent convert for such a responsible position due to Gause's experience with the Shaker communal society, because the Latter Day Saints had recently commenced their own communal experiment, the Law of Consecration. Both Gause and Smith's other counselor, Sidney Rigdon, had previous experience living in communal societies.

Gause settled into his new role, accompanying Smith to Jackson County, Missouri, between April and June 1832, in order to set up the Law of Consecration. Upon returning to Kirtland, Gause started on a mission with Zebedee Coltrin on August 1, 1832. The two missionaries traveled to North Union, where six days later Gause attempted to persuade Minerva to accept Mormonism, but she continued to refuse to join him. He then attempted unsuccessfully to take their daughter but had to leave "very much [e]nraged." Within a short time, Coltrin became ill and decided to return to Kirtland. The two men "parted in the fellowship of the gospel" on August 20. From this date Gause simply disappears from church history. It is not known what occurred to sour him on Mormonism, but by the end of 1832 he had "denied the faith" and was probably the "Bro. Jesse" recorded as excommunicated on December 3, 1832.

Gause's role in church history went unacknowledged for decades. The revelation given to him in 1832 was altered by replacing his name with his replacement in the First Presidency, Frederick G. Williams. His name was only recognized in the 1980 edition of the Doctrine and Covenants, but then only in the historical introduction to the revelation; his replacement's name remained in the text itself. Only after historians demonstrated his role in the formation of the church hierarchy, beginning with Robert J. Woodford in 1975 and D. Michael Quinn in 1983, was his name restored to the church's list of general authorities.

== Later years ==
Gause's activities after 1832 are not known. Apparently he did not rejoin Minerva at North Union, but may have returned to Chester County to be near his other children. By 1836, when he would have been 51 years old, he had died at Montgomery, Chester County, Pennsylvania. In that year his brother assumed the guardianship of Martha's children. However, his sister stated in 1873 that Gause "died away from his family", suggesting that he died estranged from his children.

== Notes ==
Church of Christ titles
First	First Counselor in First Presidency; March 8, 1832 – December 3, 1832	Succeeded by Sidney Rigdon
