= Linda L. Booth =

Former apostle in Community of Christ

- Born: Independence, Missouri, U.S.
- Education: University of Kansas (BA); Graceland University (MA)
- Occupations: Apostle and a member of the Council of Twelve Apostles
- Years active: 1998–present
- Spouse: Douglas J. Booth (m. ?)
- Children: 3

Linda L. Booth is a former apostle in the Council of Twelve Apostles of Community of Christ beginning March 31, 1998. Along with Gail E. Mengel, Booth was one of the first two women apostles in the Reorganized Church of Jesus Christ of Latter Day Saints (RLDS Church). In 2013, Booth became the first woman to be the church's president of the Council of Twelve. The RLDS Church was renamed Community of Christ in 2001.

== Biography ==
Booth is a native of Independence, Missouri and is a graduate of the University of Kansas. She was the founding editor of Kansas City Parent Magazine and the editor of Olathe Life Newspaper in Olathe, Kansas.

Prior to becoming an RLDS Church apostle, Booth had been a pastor of the RLDS Church congregation in Olathe, Kansas, and later a counselor to the president of a high priests quorum. Immediately prior to her ordination as an apostle, she had been the assistant director of communications for the RLDS Church. Along with Gail E. Mengel, Booth was selected by RLDS Prophet–President W. Grant McMurray to be an apostle and was ordained on March 31, 1998.

As of 2012, Booth was the secretary to the Council of Twelve and oversaw missionary work in the church's Southern USA Mission Field. In 2013, she became the first woman elected to serve as president of the Council of Twelve.
