= Paul Palmieri =

Paul Palmieri may refer to:

- Paul Palmieri (Bickertonite) (1933–2020), president of The Church of Jesus Christ (Bickertonite)
- Paul Palmieri (entrepreneur) (born 1970), chief executive officer of Millennial Media
