= Sidney Rigdon =

American Mormon leader (1793–1876)

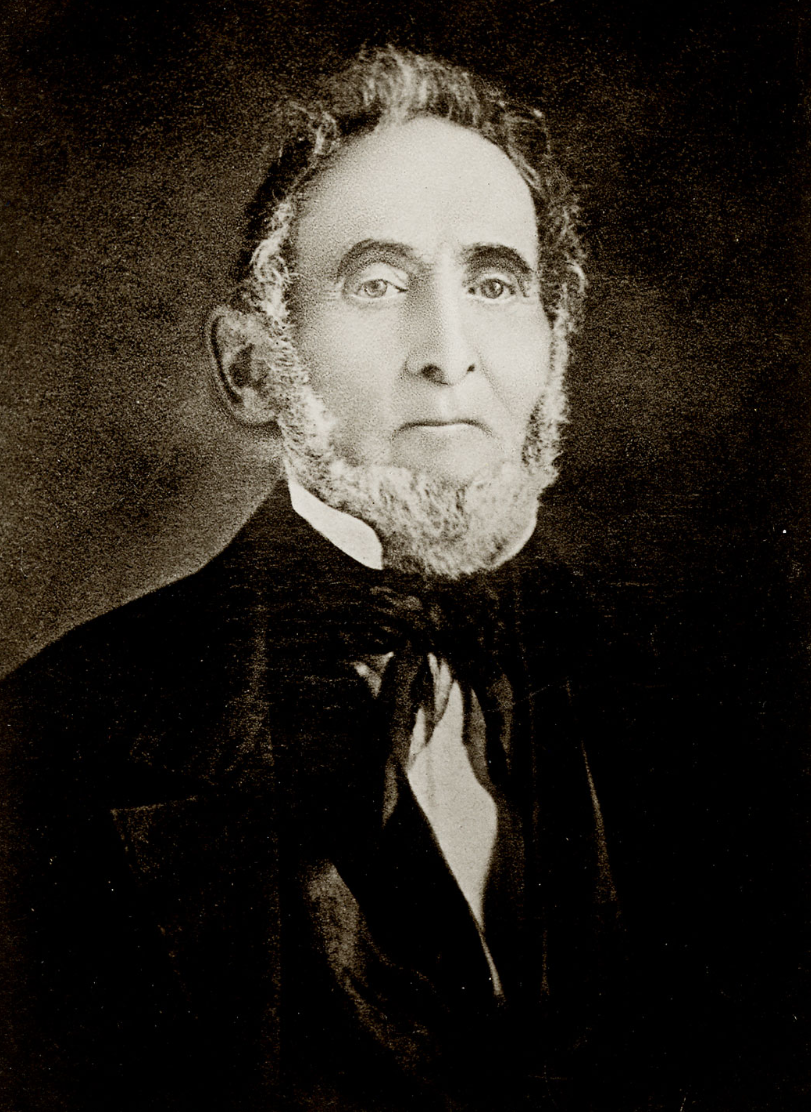
- Rigdon in 1873

President of the Church Church of Jesus Christ of the Children of Zion
- April 6, 1845 – 1847
- Predecessor: None
- Successor: Stephen Post; William Bickerton (reorganized church in 1862)

First Counselor in the First Presidency Church of Jesus Christ of Latter Day Saints
- March 18, 1833 – Summer of 1844
- Called by: Joseph Smith
- Predecessor: Jesse Gause
- End reason: Succession crisis after the death of Joseph Smith

Second Counselor in the First Presidency Church of Christ (Latter Day Saints)
- March 8, 1832 – March 18, 1833
- Called by: Joseph Smith
- Successor: Frederick G. Williams
- Reason: Initial organization of First Presidency
- End reason: Called as First Counselor in First Presidency

Personal details
- Born: February 19, 1793; St. Clair Township, Pennsylvania, United States
- Died: July 14, 1876 (aged 83); Friendship, New York, United States
- Resting place: Maple Grove Cemetery; 42.2175°N 78.1186°W
- Spouse(s): Phebe Brooks
- Children: 11, including Nancy Rigdon

Sidney Rigdon (February 19, 1793 – July 14, 1876) was an American Baptist minister and leader during the early history of the Latter Day Saint movement. Rigdon later founded the Church of Jesus Christ of the Children of Zion, a now defunct denomination succeeded by The Church of Jesus Christ.

== Biography ==
=== Early life ===
Rigdon was born in St. Clair Township, Allegheny County, Pennsylvania, on February 19, 1793. He was the youngest of four children of William and Nancy Rigdon. Rigdon's father was a farmer and a native of Harford County, Maryland. He died in 1810.

According to an account by his son John M. Rigdon, young Rigdon "borrowed all the histories he could get and began to read them. … In this way he became a great historian, the best I ever saw. He seemed to have the history of the world on his tongue's end and he got to be a great biblical scholar as well. He was as familiar with the Bible as a child was with his spelling book. He was never known to play with the boys; reading books was the greatest pleasure he could get. He studied English Grammar alone and became a very fine grammarian. He was very precise in his language."

Rigdon remained on the farm until his mother sold it in 1818.

=== Baptist ministry and tanner ===
On May 31, 1817, Rigdon was baptized by Rev. Phillips, and he became a member of the Peter's Creek Baptist Church of Library, Pennsylvania.

In 1818, Rigdon moved to North Sewickley to become an apprentice to Baptist minister Rev. Andrew Clark. Rigdon received his license to preach for the Regular Baptists in March 1819.

Rigdon moved in May to Trumbull County, Ohio, where he jointly preached with Adamson Bentley from July 1819. He married Bentley's wife's sister, Phoebe Brooks, in June 1820. Rigdon remained in Ohio until February 1822, when he returned to Pittsburgh to accept the pastorate of the First Baptist Church there under the recommendation of Alexander Campbell.

Rigdon and Bentley had journeyed to meet Campbell in the summer of 1821 to learn more about the Baptist who was encountering opposition to his idea that the New Testament should hold priority over the Old Testament in the Christian church. They engaged in lengthy discussions, with both men joining the Disciples of Christ movement associated with Campbell.

On January 28, 1822, Rigdon arrived in Pittsburgh to become a minister at the First Baptist Church. Rigdon's ministry met with opposition from member Rev. John Winter, and on July 11, 1823, a schism split the congregation, with each side disfellowshipping the other. On October 11, Rigdon was "excluded from the Redstone Association Baptist Denomination", of which the First Baptist Church was a member.

From 1824 to 1826, Rigdon worked as a journeyman tanner in Pittsburgh, while preaching Campbell's Restorationism on Sundays in the courthouse. He also worked as a journeyman printer for the Philadelphia publisher Paterson. In 1826, Rigdon became the pastor of the more liberal Baptist church in Mentor, Ohio, in the Western Reserve.

=== Latter Day Saint leader in Ohio, Missouri, and Illinois (1830–44) ===
Many prominent early Latter Day Saint leaders, including Parley P. Pratt, Isaac Morley, and Edward Partridge, were members of Rigdon's congregations prior to their conversion to the Church of Christ founded by Joseph Smith.

==== Early involvement ====
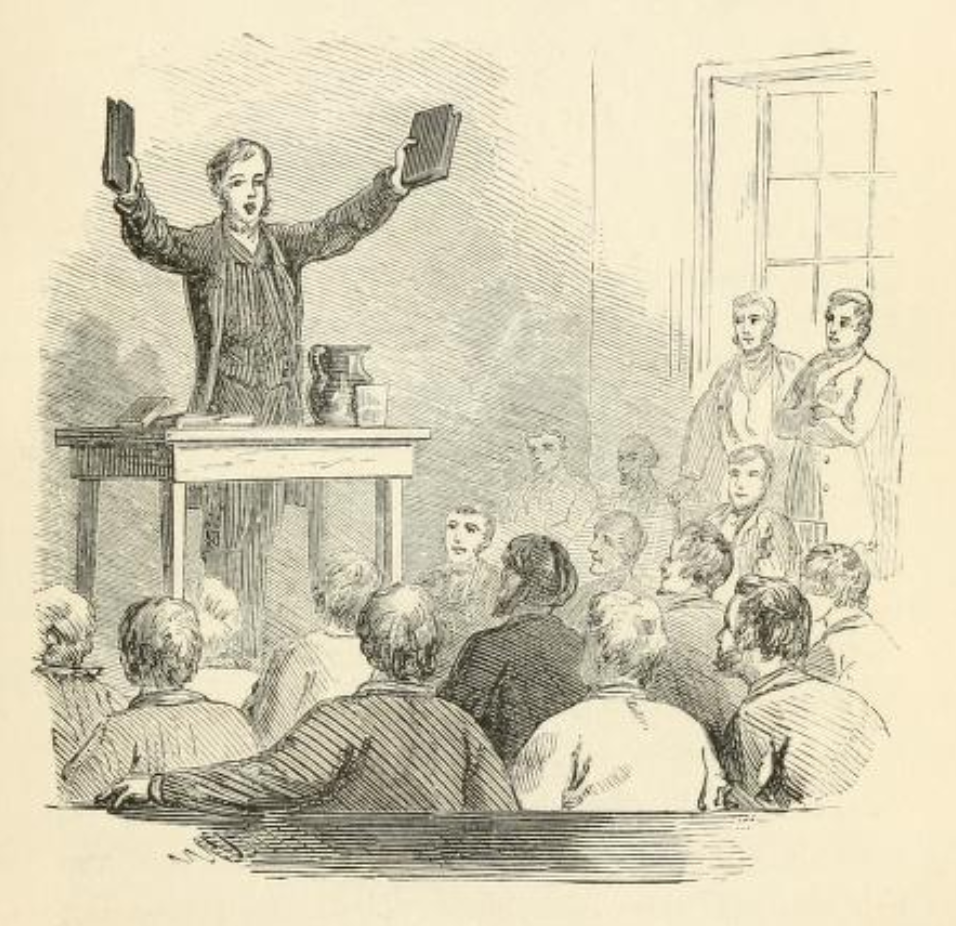
Sidney Rigdon preaching his first Mormon sermon

In early September 1830, Rigdon's associate, Pratt, was baptized into the Church of Christ founded by Smith. In October, Pratt and Ziba Peterson began a mission to preach to the American Indians.

They visited Rigdon and his wife, Phoebe, in Ohio. Rigdon read the Book of Mormon in fourteen days, proclaimed its truthfulness, and was baptized into the church on November 14, 1830, in Mentor, Ohio. He proceeded to convert hundreds of members of his Ohio congregations. In December 1830, Rigdon traveled to New York, where he met Joseph Smith. He was then ordained a high priest on June 3, 1831.

Rigdon was a fiery orator, and he was immediately called by Smith to be the spokesman for the church. He also served as a scribe and helped with Smith's re-translation of the Bible.

Rigdon as revelator

Rigdon reportedly received visions jointly with Smith. According to one account: "Joseph would, at intervals, say: 'What do I see?' as one might say while looking out the window and beholding what all in the room could not see. Then he would relate what he had seen or what he was looking at. Then Sidney replied, 'I see the same.' Presently Sidney would say 'What do I see?' and would repeat what he had seen or was seeing, and Joseph would reply, 'I see the same.' This manner of conversation was repeated at short intervals to the end of the vision."

==== Kirtland, Ohio, 1830–37 ====
In December 1830, Smith said he received a revelation counseling members of the church in New York to gather to Kirtland, Ohio. Many of the doctrines Rigdon's group had experimented with found place in the combined movement, such as living with all things in common.

August/September 1831: Rigdon rebuked

In August 1831, Smith announced that he had received a revelation admonishing Rigdon for exalting himself: "And now behold, verily I say unto you, I, the Lord, am not pleased with my servant Sidney Rigdon; he exalted himself in his heart, and received not counsel, but grieved the Spirit; Wherefore his writing is not acceptable unto the Lord, and he shall make another; and if the Lord receive it not, behold he standeth no longer in the office to which I have appointed him. … Wherefore, let all men beware how they take my name in their lips—For behold, verily I say, that many there be who are under this condemnation, who use the name of the Lord, and use it in vain, having not authority. Wherefore, let the church repent of their sins, and I, the Lord, will own them otherwise they shall be cut off."

March 1832: Tarred and feathered

Smith relocated to Hiram, Ohio, in September 1831. Smith and Rigdon were tarred and feathered at the John Johnson Farm on March 24, 1832. Smith recorded: "The next morning I went to see elder Rigdon, and found him crazy, and his head highly inflamed, for they had dragged him by his heels, and those too, so high from the earth he could not raise his head from the rough frozen surface, which lascerated it exceedingly; and when he saw me he called to his wife to bring him his razor. She asked him what he wanted of it? and he replied to kill me. Sister Rigdon left the room, and he asked me to bring his razor. I asked him what he wanted of it, and he replied he wanted to kill his wife, and he continued delirious some days."

July 1832: "Rigdon's depression"

On July 5, 1832, Rigdon taught that "the keys of the kingdom were taken from us. On hearing this, many of his hearers wept, and when some one undertook to dismiss the meeting by prayer he said praying would do them no good, and the meeting broke up in confusion."

In response, Hyrum Smith traveled to retrieve Joseph Smith, who returned to Kirtland on July 7. Joseph Smith rebuked Rigdon, and publicly prophesied that "[n]o power can pluck those keys from me, except the power that gave them to me; But for what Sidney has done, the devil shall handle him as one man handles another."

Reportedly, "About three weeks after this, Sidney was lying on his bed alone. An unseen power lifted him from his bed, threw him across the room, and tossed him from one side of the room to the other. The noise being heard in the adjoining room, his family went in to see what was the matter, and found him going from one side of the room to the other, from the effects of which Sidney was laid up for five or six weeks. Thus was Joseph's prediction in regard to him verified."

On July 28, Smith re-ordained Rigdon to the high priesthood after Rigdon had "repented like Peter of old".

First Presidency

On March 18, 1833, Smith organized the church's First Presidency and set apart Jesse Gause and Rigdon as his first two counselors. Smith and Rigdon became close partners, and Rigdon tended to supplant Oliver Cowdery, the original "Second Elder" of the church.

Rigdon became a strong advocate of the construction of the Kirtland Temple. He gave a "powerful discourse" in March 1836 at the temple's dedication. When the church founded the Kirtland Safety Society, Rigdon became the bank's president and Smith served as its cashier. When the bank failed in 1837, Rigdon and Smith were both blamed by Mormon dissenters. Rigdon supervised the church in Kirtland in Smith's absence, and taught at the Kirtland School.

==== Far West, Missouri, 1838 ====
Rigdon and Smith moved to Far West, Missouri, and established a new church headquarters there.

According to one report, while the Mormons were encamped at Adam-ondi-Ahman, Rigdon criticized Smith and others who were engaged in recreational wrestling on Sunday. Rigdon reportedly "rushed into the ring, sword in hand, and said that he would not suffer a lot of men to break the Sabbath day in that manner." Smith "dragged him from the ring, bareheaded, and tore Rigdon's fine pulpit coat from the collar to the waist." Reportedly, "after that Rigdon never countermanded the orders of the Prophet, to my knowledge—he knew who was boss."

As spokesman for the First Presidency, Rigdon preached several controversial sermons in Missouri, including the Salt Sermon and the July 4th Oration. These speeches have sometimes been seen as contributing to the conflict known as the 1838 Mormon War in Missouri.

As a result of the conflict, the Mormons were expelled from the state, and Rigdon and Smith were arrested and imprisoned in Liberty Jail. Rigdon was released on a writ of habeas corpus and made his way to Illinois, where he joined the main body of Mormon refugees in 1839.

==== Nauvoo, Illinois, 1839–44 ====
Smith and his followers were allowed to escape from Liberty Jail in Missouri as ordered by Governor Boggs, and so they were released by a sheriff on their way to stand trial. Smith went on to found the city of Nauvoo, Illinois. Rigdon continued to act as church spokesman and gave a speech at the ground-breaking of the Nauvoo Temple. On June 1, 1841, Sidney Rigdon was ordained as a "Prophet, Seer, and Revelator".

However, Smith and Rigdon's relationship began to deteriorate in Nauvoo. Rigdon's participation in church administrative affairs became minimal. He did not reside in Nauvoo and served in a local church presidency in Pittsburgh, Pennsylvania. He was also in poor health.

In the summer of 1842, John C. Bennett, accused Smith of attempting to take Rigdon's daughter Nancy Rigdon as a plural wife. According to Bennett, Nancy rejected the proposal. The accusation led to a confrontation between the Rigdon and Smith families wherein Smith denied having raised the issue with Nancy.

October 1843: Smith attempts to replace Rigdon

In October 1843, a Special Conference was called to consider "the case and standing of Elder Sidney Rigdon".

Joseph Smith "stated his dissatisfaction" with Rigdon. Charges were leveled that Rigdon had disloyal correspondences with John C. Bennett, former Governor Carlin, and "the Missourians". Rigdon was also accused to "leaguing with dishonest persons in endeavoring to defraud the innocent". In "indirect testimony" from Porter Rockwell's mother, Rigdon was accused of having been responsible for informing others about Smith's visit to Dixon and instructing them to arrest him while there.

Smith told the conference that, in light of the charges, Smith requested Rigdon be replaced as First Counselor.

The Times and Seasons and the History of the Church both record that Rigdon addressed the conference, denied the charges and made a "moving appeal"; they record "the sympathies of the congregation were highly excited". A vote was called, and the congregation held that Rigdon would be permitted to retain his position.

According to the Times and Seasons, Smith had "wholly removed suspicion from elder Sidney Rigdon" and "expressed entire willingness to have elder Sidney Rigdon retain his station", despite a "lack of confidence in his integrity and steadfastness, judging from their past intercourse". Alternately, the History of the Church records that Smith replied to the vote by saying, "I have thrown him off my shoulders, and you have again put him on me. You may carry him, but I will not."

1844: Rigdon as Vice-Presidential candidate

When Smith began his campaign for the presidency of the United States in 1844, Rigdon was selected as his vice-presidential running mate. After Smith's death, Rigdon was the senior surviving member of the First Presidency. (The other members were John Smith, who was an assistant counselor, and Amasa Lyman, who was a counselor.) During this time, Rigdon was strongly opposed to polygamy and other innovations within the church.

=== Aftermath of Smith's death ===
Joseph Smith was killed in 1844. Prior to Smith's death, the First Presidency had made nearly all the major decisions for the church. In 1841, Rigdon had been ordained by Smith as a "Prophet, Seer, and Revelator", as had all other members of the First Presidency and of the Quorum of the Twelve Apostles of the Church.

Rigdon returned to Nauvoo on August 3, and the next day he announced at a public meeting that he had received a revelation appointing him "Guardian of the Church". The president of the central stake, William Marks, supported Rigdon.

At an August 8 conference, Rigdon argued that he should be made the "Protector" of the church." Brigham Young, president of the Quorum of the Twelve Apostles, opposed this motion and asserted a claim for the primacy of the Quorum of the Twelve Apostles. The Quorum of Twelve Apostles were scattered throughout the United States and Europe at the time of Smith's death. The members of the quorum available in Illinois, in addition to a gathered assembly, voted to deny Rigdon his claim for church leadership. Rigdon felt this action was done without proper order.

One month later, on September 8, Rigdon was excommunicated from the church by a Common Council of the Church, which had been convened by Presiding Bishop Newel K. Whitney. Rigdon refused to attend this trial, after which he, in turn, likewise excommunicated the members of the Twelve. Rigdon fled Nauvoo, claiming that he felt threatened by Young's supporters.

=== Latter Day Saint leader in Pennsylvania and New York, 1845–76 ===
After the succession schism, Rigdon solidified and led an independent faction of Latter Day Saints, originally called the "Church of Christ", but at one point was called the Church of Jesus Christ of the Children of Zion. This sect is often referred to as the Rigdonites. The Latter Day Saints who followed Rigdon separated themselves and settled in Pittsburgh, Pennsylvania. On April 6, 1845, Rigdon presided over a conference of the Church of Christ, which he claimed was the rightful continuation of the church founded by Smith. He then reorganized the First Presidency and called his own Quorum of Twelve Apostles.

Although Rigdon's church briefly flourished through the publication of his periodical, The Messenger and Advocate, quarrels and bickering among the Rigdonites led most members of the church to desert the senior leader by 1847. A few loyalists, notably William Bickerton, eventually reorganized the church in 1862 under the name The Church of Jesus Christ.

Rigdon lived on for many years in Pennsylvania and New York. He maintained his testimony of the Book of Mormon and clung to his claims that he was the rightful heir to Joseph Smith. He died in Friendship, New York, on July 14, 1876.

== Significance in the Latter Day Saint movement ==
Following the murder of Joseph Smith in 1844, a succession crisis led to schisms within the movement. The Brigham Young branch traveled west to Utah, while Rigdon traveled eastward to Pittsburgh.

Rigdon's branch faced less success, modernly accounting for only a small fraction of practicing Latter Day Saints.

As early as 1834, skeptics were promoting what has become known as the Spalding-Rigdon theory of Book of Mormon authorship, in which Rigdon plays a central role.

=== Churches tracing their leadership through Rigdon ===
Name	Organized by	Date	Split off / Continuation of	Current status	Notes
Church of Jesus Christ of the Children of Zion	Sidney Rigdon	1844	Church of Jesus Christ of Latter Day Saints	Dissolved by 1847	Originally also used the name "Church of Christ". Also known as Rigdonites.
The Church of Jesus Christ (Bickertonite)	William Bickerton	1862	Organized by former members of the Church of Jesus Christ of the Children of Zion (Rigdonites), by then defunct	12,136 as of 2007; headquartered in Monongahela, Pennsylvania	Adherents commonly referred to as Bickertonites (church actively opposes use of this term).
Reorganized Church of Jesus Christ (Bickertonite)	Half of the Bickertonite Quorum of Twelve Apostles	1907	Church of Jesus Christ (Bickertonite)	Defunct	Dispute over nature of life in the millennium split Bickertonite Quorum of the Twelve in two; later merged with the Primitive Church of Jesus Christ (Bickertonite).
Primitive Church of Jesus Christ (Bickertonite)	James Caldwell	1914	Church of Jesus Christ (Bickertonite)	Defunct	Rejected the First Presidency as a valid leadership organization of the church; later merged with the Reorganized Church of Jesus Christ (Bickertonite).

== Rigdon as purported author of the Book of Mormon ==
Rigdon has been named as a potential author for the Book of Mormon. According to this theory, Rigdon obtained from a Pittsburgh publisher a manuscript for a historical novel written by Solomon Spalding, and by reworking it and adding a theological component, created the Book of Mormon.

The theory that Sidney Rigdon was the true author of the Book of Mormon first appeared in print in an August 31, 1831, article by James Gordon Bennett, who had visited the Palmyra/Manchester area and interviewed several residents. The theory of Rigdon's use of a Spalding manuscript first appeared in print in the 1834 book Mormonism Unvailed. The theory also later appeared in 1867 in Origin, Rise, and Progress of Mormonism by Pomeroy Tucker, in which he says Smith was visited by a "mysterious stranger" as early as 1827, who Tucker implies played a role in the creation of the Book of Mormon and later identifies the stranger as Rigdon.

This theory and the testimony of Rigdon to his son John, just prior to Rigdon's death and long after he had ceased an affiliation with any of the sects of Mormonism, contradict each other: "My father, after I had finished saying what I have repeated above, looked at me a moment, raised his hand above his head and slowly said, with tears glistening in his eyes: 'My son, I can swear before high heaven that what I have told you about the origin of [the Book of Mormon] is true. Your mother and sister, Mrs. Athalia Robinson, were present when that book was handed to me in Mentor, Ohio, and all I ever knew about the origin of [the Book of Mormon] was what Parley P. Pratt, Oliver Cowdery, Joseph Smith and the witnesses who claimed they saw the plates have told me, and in all of my intimacy with Joseph Smith he never told me but one story.'" However, Rigdon's grandson, Walter Sidney Rigdon, stated in an interview that the family knew that the "Golden Bible" was a hoax, contrived by Rigdon and Joseph Smith, to make money and that it was based on the Spalding manuscript.

A 2008 computer analysis of the Book of Mormon text supports this theory, although the study does not include Joseph Smith in the author sample on the ground that few pure examples of Smith's writings are extant. Several other significant problems are apparent in the methodology of this computer analysis, specifically the use of closed set methodology instead of open set methodology. For example, the original methodology, when replicated, also assigns Rigdon as the probable author of The Federalist Papers, which were written five years before his birth.

== Notes ==
Church of Jesus Christ of the Children of Zion titles
Preceded by Joseph Smith as President of the Church of Jesus Christ of Latter Day Saints	President of the Church; March 1856 – July 14, 1876	Succeeded by Stephen Post
Church of Christ (Rigdonite) titles Reorganized in 1862 under the name The Church of Jesus Christ
Preceded by Joseph Smith as President of the Church of Jesus Christ of Latter Day Saints	President of the Church; April 6, 1845 – 1847	Succeeded by William Bickerton
Church of Christ titles Later renamed: Church of the Latter Day Saints (1834) and Church of Jesus Christ of Latter Day Saints (1838)
Preceded by Jesse Gause	First Counselor in the First Presidency; March 18, 1833 – June 27, 1844	Succeeded by Disputed: Possible successors include: Heber C. Kimball (LDS Church); William Marks (RLDS Church)
First	Second Counselor in the First Presidency; March 8, 1832 – March 18, 1833	Succeeded by Frederick G. Williams
