= List of presidents of the Church of Jesus Christ (Bickertonite) =

This list of presidents of the Church of Jesus Christ includes all presidents of the Church of Jesus Christ (Bickertonite).

No.	Portrait	President	Life	Service	Length
1		Joseph Smith	December 23, 1805 – June 27, 1844	April 6, 1830 – June 27, 1844	14 years
2		Sidney Rigdon	February 19, 1793 – July 14, 1876	April 6, 1845 – 1847	2 years
3		William Bickerton	January 15, 1815 – February 17, 1905	July 1862 – July 1880	18 years
4		William Cadman	April 1834 – November 6, 1905	July 1880 – November 6, 1905	25 years
5		Alexander Cherry	June 29, 1852 – August 31, 1921	July 1906 – August 31, 1921	15 years
6		William Henry Cadman	December 19, 1876 – April 15, 1963	July 1922 – April 15, 1963	41 years
7		Thurman Furnier	April 21, 1888 – November 17, 1973	April 1963 – April 1965	2 years
8		Gorie Ciaravino	August 5, 1911 – April 7, 1995	April 1965 – April 1974	9 years
9		Dominic Richard Thomas	September 11, 1924 – March 19, 2005	1974–2005	31 years
10		Paul Palmieri	April 9, 1933 – May 6, 2020	2005 – October 13, 2018	13 years
11		Joel Cadman Gehly	1959 – living	October 13, 2018 – incumbent	7 years, 238 days
