= Frederick G. Williams =

American Mormon leader (1787–1842)

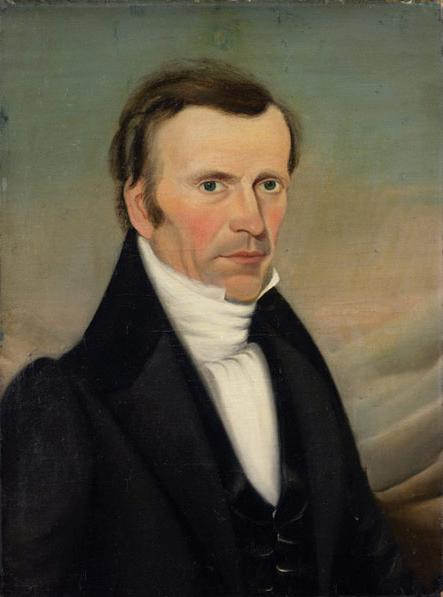

Second Counselor in First Presidency Church of the Latter Day Saints
- February 18, 1833 – November 7, 1837
- Called by: Joseph Smith
- Predecessor: Sidney Rigdon
- Successor: Hyrum Smith
- End reason: Removed from position by vote of the church

Personal details
- Born: Frederick Granger Williams; October 28, 1787; Suffield, Connecticut, United States
- Died: October 10, 1842 (aged 54); Quincy, Illinois, United States
- Resting place: Early Quincy Cemetery (now Madison Park); 39.931°N 91.3761°W
- Spouse(s): Rebecca Swain
- Parents: William W. Williams; Ruth Granger

Frederick Granger Williams (October 28, 1787 – October 10, 1842) was an early leader of the Latter Day Saint movement, serving in the First Presidency of the Church of the Latter Day Saints from 1833 to 1837.

== Life ==
Williams was born at Suffield, Connecticut, to William Wheeler Williams and Ruth Granger. He studied the herb-based Thomsonian method of medicine, and worked as a medical doctor. In the War of 1812, Williams was present for battles on the northern frontier. He became a maritime pilot on waterways from Buffalo, New York to Detroit. He married Rebecca Swain in December 1815. By 1828 he was living in Chardon, Ohio, and he moved to Kirtland in 1830. While in Ohio, he associated himself with Sidney Rigdon and the Disciples of Christ. When Oliver Cowdery and other early Latter Day Saints were traveling through Kirtland, they taught and baptized many in Rigdon's congregation, including Williams.

On July 20, 1832, Williams was appointed scribe to Joseph Smith and joined the church's First Presidency the next year. He was a member of the committee appointed to publish the Doctrine and Covenants, a portion of the church's canon, as well as the church's first hymnal from 1835, compiled by Smith's wife, Emma, under the auspices of F.G. Williams & Co.

In 1837, Williams was elected a justice of the peace in Kirtland, appointed an officer in the Kirtland Safety Society, released from the First Presidency, and moved to Far West, Caldwell, County, Missouri. Although there is no record of an excommunication, Williams was rebaptized in August 1838. He was excommunicated in absentia in March 1839 by proceedings in Nauvoo, Illinois, while Joseph Smith was in Liberty Jail, Missouri. Williams was at Liberty Jail to see Joseph Smith about the time he was excommunicated. Williams was restored to fellowship at a church conference presided over by Smith in April 1840. Williams died of a pulmonary hemorrhage at Quincy, Illinois in October 1842.

== Legacy ==
As Smith's scribe and counselor, Williams became a close friend and confidant of the prophet. Joseph and Emma Smith named one of their sons Frederick Granger Williams Smith (June 20, 1836 – April 13, 1862).

The lineage of Williams continues in the Church of Jesus Christ of Latter-day Saints, with at least several hundred descendants from six generations as members. Williams's great-great-grandson, and namesake, Frederick Granger Williams, served as president of the Recife Brazil Temple (2009–12) and then as a professor at Brigham Young University in Provo, Utah.

== Notes ==
Church of Christ titles Later renamed: The Church of Jesus Christ of Latter Day Saints (1834)
| Preceded by Sidney Rigdon | Second Counselor in the First Presidency; February 18, 1833 – November 7, 1837 | Succeeded by Hyrum Smith |
