= Rigdonite =

Name for members of the LDS movement

A Rigdonite is a member of the Latter Day Saint movement who accepts Sidney Rigdon as the successor in the church presidency to the movement's founder, Joseph Smith Jr. The early history of the Rigdonite movement is shared with the history of the Latter Day Saint movement, but as of the 1844 succession crisis becomes distinct. Sidney Rigdon and other church leaders, including Brigham Young and James J. Strang, presented themselves as leaders of the movement and established rival church organizations. Rigdon's group was initially headquartered in Pittsburgh, Pennsylvania. It was known at one point as the Church of Jesus Christ of the Children of Zion, and its adherents are referred to as Rigdonites, or sometimes "Pennsylvania Latter Day Saints" or "Pennsylvania Mormons." The only surviving organization that traces its succession back to Rigdon's organizations is The Church of Jesus Christ, founded by a group of Rigdon's followers led by William Bickerton.

== History ==
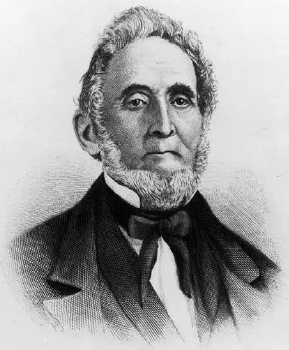
Sidney Rigdon

=== Background ===
On June 1, 1841, Sidney Rigdon had been ordained by Joseph Smith as a "Prophet, Seer and Revelator"—which was one of the same ecclesiastical titles held by Smith. The Church of Jesus Christ maintains that as First Counselor to Smith, Rigdon should naturally have been the leader of the church after Smith's death. With this understanding, The Church of Jesus Christ disagrees that the Quorum of Twelve had the right to lead the church. The Church of Jesus Christ argues that Rigdon should have been allowed to be what he claimed to be—a "guardian" over the church until proper proceedings could decide the next president—and that proceedings which resulted in Brigham Young leading the church constituted a procedural violation.

After the death of Joseph Smith in 1844, Sidney Rigdon, who had been the first counselor in the First Presidency, claimed to have received a vision sustaining him as the leader of the Church. The subsequent succession crisis caused a large amount of confusion about who should succeed the slain prophet. Rigdon claimed the right to lead the church as the senior surviving member of the church's highest ruling body, the First Presidency. Up until Smith's death, the First Presidency had made nearly all the major decisions and led the Church of Christ both naturally and spiritually. The Quorum of Twelve Apostles, led by Brigham Young, also claimed the right to lead the church. The Quorum of the Twelve's claim was derived from a revelation of Joseph Smith allowing them to stand equal to the First Presidency in attending to natural matters of the church.

On December 27, 1847, when Young organized a new First Presidency, the Quorum of the Twelve only had seven of the original twelve members present to represent a council to decide the Presidency. William Smith, John E. Page, and Lyman Wight had previously denounced the proceedings and were not present (Young had called replacement apostles, but Rigdon saw these callings as invalid). John Taylor and Parley P. Pratt were in the Salt Lake Valley and could not have known of the proceedings. This left just seven present, a majority of one meaning Young would have to vote for himself in order to gain a majority quorum vote in favor of his leadership. Young chose two of the other apostles, Heber C. Kimball and Willard Richards, as his counselors in the First Presidency. This left only four members of the Quorum of the Twelve, as recognized by Sidney, present to vote in favor of creation of the new First Presidency: Orson Hyde, Wilford Woodruff, George A. Smith, and Orson Pratt. The Church of Jesus Christ views this action as a violation of church law compromising the authority of Sidney Rigdon without a majority quorum vote. The LDS Church does not agree with this view of the proceedings, as they recognize newly ordained apostles under Joseph Smith as authorized to offer a sustaining vote.

=== Rigdon's Pittsburgh church ===
Undaunted, Rigdon relocated to Pittsburgh and established a rival organization of the church. Ebenezer Robinson, founding publisher of the Times and Seasons, became publisher of a new church periodical, the Latter Day Saints' Messenger and Advocate, (later the Messenger and Advocate of the Church of Christ.) The Rigdonite paper sought to expose and condemn the practice of plural marriage. Church elder Benjamin Winchester commented that Young and the Quorum of the Twelve had:

"Excited a certain portion of the Church to reject Elder Rigdon (which is a most horrid outrage upon the laws of the same) from a fear that he would bring them to...justice for teaching and practicing the doctrine of polygamy."

The Rigdonites came to believe that Joseph Smith had become a fallen prophet when he began to practice polygamy and that, as a result the "Lord smote him for this thing—cut him off from the earth." (Messenger and Advocate, Jan. 1, 1845)

Rigdon toured the eastern branches of the church in late 1844 and early 1845, gathering leaders to his cause. He was joined by former members of the First Presidency, John C. Bennett and William Law and also by former Apostle William E. McLellin.

On April 6, 1845—fifteen years after the original organization of the church—Rigdon presided over a General Conference of Rigdonite Latter Day Saints in Pittsburgh, establishing a new hierarchy. He himself was sustained as President of the Church. The new Quorum of the Twelve Apostles consisted of: William E. McLellin, George W. Robinson, Benjamin Winchester, James Blakeslee, Josiah Ells, Hugh Herringshaw, David L. Lathrop, Jeremiah Hatch, Jr., E.R. Swackhammer, William Small, Samuel Bennett. Carvel Rigdon became Presiding Patriarch, and a Standing High Council, Quorum of the Seventy, Presiding Bishopric, and other quorum presidencies were established. In addition, Rigdon called seventy-three men and boys to a "Grand Council," perhaps an adaptation of the Council of Fifty. Also at the conference, the new church organization formally returned its name to the 1830 church's original name, the "Church of Christ."

At a General Conference held that fall in Philadelphia, Rigdon announced that the church would re-establish a communitarian society on what was named "Adventure Farm" near Greencastle, Pennsylvania. Like many attempts to live the Law of Consecration in the Latter Day Saint movement, this experiment proved a failure. Rigdonite apostles William E. McLellin and Benjamin Winchester grew disgusted with Rigdon's leadership and found a new church president and organization in the person of David Whitmer and the Church of Christ (Whitmerite).

One of the replacements in the Quorum was William Bickerton. Bickerton, however, disagreed with Rigdon's proposed move to Greencastle and severed his ties to the Church. Bickerton remained in Monongahela, Pennsylvania, and never moved to Greencastle. By April 1847, the Adventure Farm community had collapsed and Rigdon had abandoned his flock, living out the rest of his life on the charity of relatives in New York state. Bickerton continued to live in the Monongahela area and in 1849 began meeting informally with other believers whom he had converted to the faith, few of which had ever been associated with Rigdon. In 1862, he formally organized his Pennsylvania followers into The Church of Jesus Christ.

=== Church of Jesus Christ of the Children of Zion ===
In January 1856, Stephen Post wrote to Rigdon about the disordered state of Mormonism, and in March Rigdon responded to Post's letter with a revelation commanding him to assist in reestablishing the Rigdonite organization. Post embraced Rigdon's prophetic claims and became an advocate of his cause, with an 1866 revelation designating him Rigdon's "spokesman." Post's non-Mormon wife, Jane, converted to the Rigdonite church in 1865 and was ordained an elder in 1868. In 1871, Post was sent on a mission to Manitoba, Canada, where he spent the rest of his life. After Rigdon's death, Post succeeded him as leader of the church, but died three years later. In 1880, Andrew J. Hinckle was appointed President of the Church in his stead, but was replaced by Jane Post in 1882. After Jane Post's death, the remaining organization quickly collapsed.

=== Scripture ===
Sidney Rigdon and his followers rejected many of the teachings taught by Joseph Smith. However, they accepted the Bible and the Book of Mormon as the word of God. In addition, Sidney Rigdon wrote many revelations in letters to Stephen Post, who then distributed it to Rigdon's adherents.

== See also ==
- The Church of Jesus Christ (Bickertonite)
- Primitive Church of Jesus Christ (Bickertonite): defunct Rigdonite/Bickertonite church
- Reorganized Church of Jesus Christ (Bickertonite): defunct Rigdonite/Bickertonite church

== Sources ==
- Stone, Daniel P. (2018) [2018]. William Bickerton: Forgotten Latter Day Prophet. Salt Lake City, Utah, USA: Signature Books. ISBN 978-1560852681. OCLC 1021065465.
- Van Wagoner, Richard S.: Sidney Rigdon: A Portrait of Religious Excess.
- Rigdon, Sidney, et al.: An Appeal to the Latter Day Saints (1863).
- William H. Cadman, A History of the Church of Jesus Christ, Monongahela, PA: The Church of Jesus Christ, 1945.
