= Quorum of Twelve Apostles (Bickertonite) =

Front row (L–R): Apostles Paul Liberto, Joseph Calabrese, Paul Palmieri, Isaac Smith, and John R. Griffith. Second row: Apostle Peter Scolaro

In The Church of Jesus Christ (Bickertonite), the Quorum of Twelve Apostles is composed of the chief governing officers of the church. Currently, the president of the church and his two counselors are not separated from the quorum, as the church interprets scriptures as permitting a maximum number of twelve apostles, all of whom should be members of the quorum. Like all ministers of the church, the twelve apostles are volunteers and are not given any compensation for their ministry.

== History ==
At a conference in Green Oak, Pennsylvania in July 1862, leaders of several branches in Pennsylvania, Ohio and Virginia came together and formally organized what they called "The Church of Jesus Christ". William Bickerton presided over the conference. Bickerton's two counselors in the newly organized First Presidency were George Barnes and Charles Brown who were ordained apostles. The members of the Quorum of the Twelve of that organization (ordered by seniority) were Arthur Bickerton, Thomas Bickerton, Alexander Bickerton, James Brown, Cummings Cherry, Benjamin Meadowcroft, Joseph Astin, Joseph Knox, William Cadman, James Nichols, John Neish and John Dixon. At the conference George Barnes reported receiving the "word of the Lord," which he related:

Hear the word of the Lord; Ye are my Sons and Daughters, and I have committed unto you the Keys of the Kingdom, therefore be ye faithful .

== List of members ==
#	Year	Name(s); * = reordination
1	July 1862	Joseph Astin, Alexander Bickerton, Arthur Bickerton, Thomas Bickerton, James Brown, William Cadman, Sr.; Cummings Cherry, John Dixon, Joseph Knox, Benjamin Meadowcroft, John Neish, James Nichols
2	January 1863	George Barnes, Charles Brown
3	July 1863	William Bickerton
4	July 1865	William Bacon, William Skillen
5	January 1870	Andrew Rattray
6	July 1873	James Louttit
7	July 1904	J. L. Armbrust, William H. Cadman, Marion Campbell, Alexander Cherry, Thomas Dixon, William Lynch, William T. Maxwell, James Skillen, Thornton Welch, John Williams, Allen Wright
8	July 1905	Solomon Van Lieu
9	July 1906	William Helms
10	July 1907	Francis Federer, Nephi Federer, John Grimes, Charles Tickhill
11	July 1908	Robert Anderson, Charles Ashton, Gustave Blum, Alma Cadman
12	July 1909	James Caldwell
13	July 1910	John Penn
14	July 1911	Vernon Chester, John Majoros
15	October 1911	George Neill, Isaac Smith
16	April 1912	Samuel Sanders, Fred Smith, John Ward
17	July 1914	Herman Kennedy, Harry Nicholson
18	October 1917	Thurman Furnier
19	Circa 1918	James C. Cowan
20	July 1919	Gustave Bloom *, E. J. Perry
21	August 1923	Charles Behanna, Joseph Corrado, Martin King, Ishmael D'Amico
22	July 1925	Alma Cadman *
23	July 1931	Isaac Smith *
24	April 1934	John Falola, Sr.
25	July 1934	John Dulisse
26	July 1939	Rocco Biscotti, Joseph Lovalvo
27	July 1941	Angelo Antonio Corrado, Samuel Kirschner, V. James Lovalvo
28	January 1944	James C. Cowan*
29	January 1948	Charles Behanna*
30	April 1953	Joseph Bittinger, Paul D'Amico
31	April 1956	Russell Cadman, Gorie Ciaravino, William Gennaro
32	April 1964	Frank Calabrese, Dominic Thomas
33	May 1974	Nick Pietrangelo
34	April 1979	Robert A. Watson
35	October 1986	Paul Palmieri
36	April 1989	Paul Benyola, Joseph Calabrese
37	October 1995	Thomas M. Liberto
38	October 1997	Peter Scolaro, Isaac Smith
39	October 2003	Richard T. Christman, John R. Griffith
40	April 2005	Paul Liberto, Philip R. Jackson
41	April 2007	Leonard A. Lovalvo
42	October 2007	James Crudup
43	October 2012	Joel Gehly
44	October 2015	Frank Natoli, Paul Aaron Palmieri
45	April 2018	Jerry Valenti
46	October 2021	Pete Giannetti, Scott Griffith

Current members of the Quorum of Twelve Apostles are: Thomas M. Liberto, Peter Scolaro, John R. Griffith, Paul Liberto, Leonard A. Lovalvo, James Crudup, Joel Gehly, Frank Natoli, Paul Aaron Palmieri, Jerry Valenti, Pete Giannetti and Scott Griffith.

Joel Gehly currently serves as church president, with Peter Scolaro and Frank Natoli as counselors.
