= St. John, Kansas =

City in Stafford County, Kansas

- City and County seat
- Location within Stafford County and Kansas

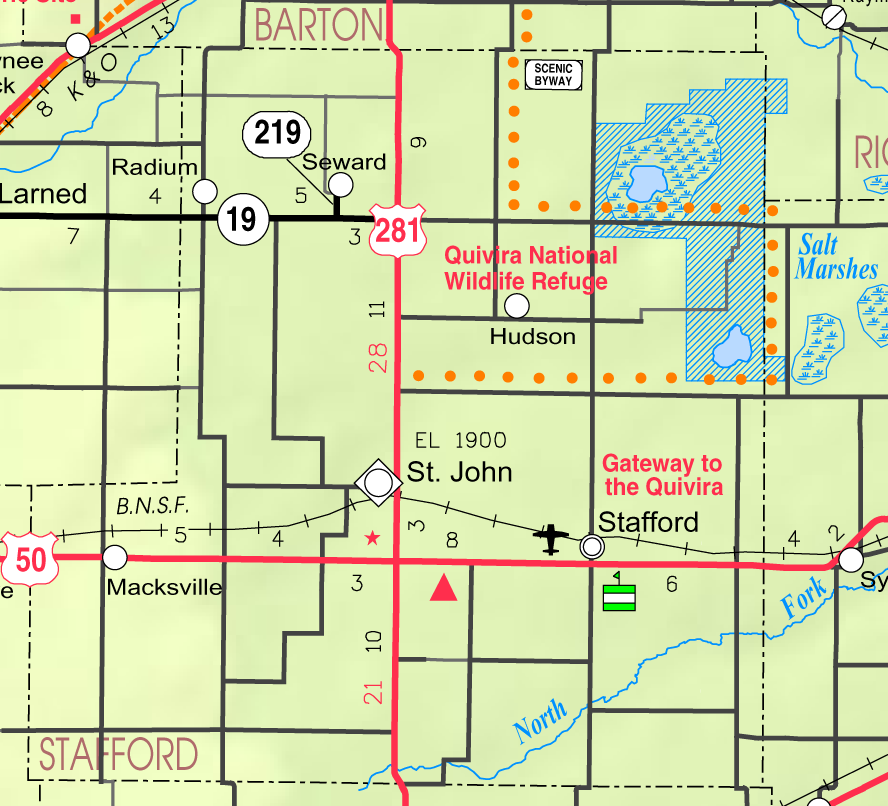
- KDOT map of Stafford County (legend)
- Coordinates: 38°00′00″N 98°45′40″W
- Country: United States
- State: Kansas
- County: Stafford
- Founded: 1875
- Incorporated: 1885
- Named for: John St. John

Area
  - Total: 1.95 sq mi (5.04 km^{2})
  - Land: 1.95 sq mi (5.04 km^{2})
  - Water: 0 sq mi (0.00 km^{2})
- Elevation: 1,910 ft (580 m)

Population (2020)
  - Total: 1,228
  - Density: 631/sq mi (244/km^{2})
- Time zone: UTC-6 (CST)
  - Summer (DST): UTC-5 (CDT)
- ZIP Code: 67576
- Area code: 620
- FIPS code: 20-62275
- GNIS ID: 2396496
- Website: www.stjohnkansas.org

St. John is a city in and the county seat of Stafford County, Kansas, United States. As of the 2020 census, the population of the city was 1,228.

== History ==
The first settlement in what is today St. John was made in 1875 when William Bickerton of the Church of Jesus Christ founded a religious colony named Zion Valley. By 1879, Zion Valley had grown into a small town, and the residents renamed it St. John, after then governor John P. St. John, in order to gain favor in winning the county seat of Stafford County.

In 2015, due to diligent work of local citizens and former local graduates, the official government listing of locations has been corrected to spell the town correctly as "St. John" instead of "Saint John" that was incorrectly changed by the United States Postal Service in the 1970s.

== Geography ==
According to the United States Census Bureau, the city has a total area of 1.88 square miles (4.87 km^{2}), all land.

== Demographics ==
Historical population
Census	Pop.	Note	%±
1880	56		—
1890	865		1,444.6%
1900	869		0.5%
1910	1,785		105.4%
1920	1,671		−6.4%
1930	1,552		−7.1%
1940	1,735		11.8%
1950	1,735		0.0%
1960	1,753		1.0%
1970	1,477		−15.7%
1980	1,501		1.6%
1990	1,357		−9.6%
2000	1,318		−2.9%
2010	1,295		−1.7%
2020	1,228		−5.2%
U.S. Decennial Census

=== 2020 census ===
The 2020 United States census counted 1,228 people, 491 households, and 309 families in St. John. The population density was 631.7 per square mile (243.9/km^{2}). There were 570 housing units at an average density of 293.2 per square mile (113.2/km^{2}). The racial makeup was 82.08% (1,008) white or European American (76.79% non-Hispanic white), 0.16% (2) black or African-American, 1.38% (17) Native American or Alaska Native, 0.16% (2) Asian, 0.0% (0) Pacific Islander or Native Hawaiian, 5.94% (73) from other races, and 10.26% (126) from two or more races. Hispanic or Latino of any race was 17.92% (220) of the population.

Of the 491 households, 29.7% had children under the age of 18; 49.5% were married couples living together; 24.0% had a female householder with no spouse or partner present. 32.8% of households consisted of individuals and 16.7% had someone living alone who was 65 years of age or older. The average household size was 2.5 and the average family size was 3.1. The percent of those with a bachelor's degree or higher was estimated to be 17.1% of the population.

24.2% of the population was under the age of 18, 8.4% from 18 to 24, 22.1% from 25 to 44, 23.4% from 45 to 64, and 21.9% who were 65 years of age or older. The median age was 40.4 years. For every 100 females, there were 104.0 males. For every 100 females ages 18 and older, there were 102.8 males.

The 2016–2020 5-year American Community Survey estimates show that the median household income was $54,962 (with a margin of error of +/- $8,416) and the median family income was $65,625 (+/- $13,766). Males had a median income of $31,719 (+/- $4,800) versus $27,328 (+/- $3,709) for females. The median income for those above 16 years old was $30,523 (+/- $4,133). Approximately, 7.1% of families and 12.5% of the population were below the poverty line, including 10.1% of those under the age of 18 and 12.2% of those ages 65 or over.

=== 2010 census ===
As of the census of 2010, there were 1,295 people, 534 households, and 336 families residing in the city. The population density was 688.8 inhabitants per square mile (265.9/km^{2}). There were 642 housing units at an average density of 341.5 per square mile (131.9/km^{2}). The racial makeup of the city was 92.4% White, 0.2% African American, 1.2% Native American, 0.8% Asian, 4.2% from other races, and 1.2% from two or more races. Hispanic or Latino of any race were 15.1% of the population.

There were 534 households, of which 30.3% had children under the age of 18 living with them, 51.5% were married couples living together, 7.9% had a female householder with no husband present, 3.6% had a male householder with no wife present, and 37.1% were non-families. 34.8% of all households were made up of individuals, and 18.2% had someone living alone who was 65 years of age or older. The average household size was 2.38 and the average family size was 3.09.

The median age in the city was 42.7 years. 25.9% of residents were under the age of 18; 7.4% were between the ages of 18 and 24; 20.5% were from 25 to 44; 26.2% were from 45 to 64; and 19.9% were 65 years of age or older. The gender makeup of the city was 49.4% male and 50.6% female.

== Education ==
The community is served by St. John–Hudson USD 350 public school district. It is home to St. John–Hudson High School. The mascot is a Tiger.
