= Reorganized Church of Jesus Christ (Bickertonite) =

The Reorganized Church of Jesus Christ was a sect that was created in 1907 from dissenting members of The Church of Jesus Christ (Bickertonite). Like its parent church, the Reorganized Church of Jesus Christ was a Rigdonite and Bickertonite organization: it traced the claim of succession to Latter Day Saint movement founder Joseph Smith through Sidney Rigdon and William Bickerton.

At the conference of The Church of Jesus Christ in 1907, church apostle Allen Wright distributed a pamphlet that expressed a dissenting opinion on the Second Coming of Jesus and the nature of Christ's millennial reign on earth. The conference condemned the publication and passed a resolution that suspended any member who believed Wright's ideas. Wright and five other members of the church's Quorum of Twelve Apostles refused to sustain the administrative action of the conference and subsequently were removed from office and excommunicated from The Church of Jesus Christ. A few months later, the six apostles and their followers organized the Reorganized Church of Jesus Christ. Another of the former church apostles, William T. Maxwell, was selected as the church's inaugural president.

The Reorganized Church of Jesus Christ eventually merged with the Primitive Church of Jesus Christ, another schismatic Bickertonite sect that was created in 1914. By the 1970s, the combined church had dwindled to a single congregation in Erie, Pennsylvania. Today, the church is believed to be defunct, leaving The Church of Jesus Christ headquartered in Monongahela, Pennsylvania as the only surviving Rigdonite–Bickertonite sect.

== Church publications ==
- J.L. Armburst (1929). Reformation or Restoration, or Which Is the Church? Jesus Christ Established but One Visible Church (N.p.: Reorganized Church of Jesus Christ)
- W.T. Maxwell (1908). A Statement Issued by the Re-Organized Church of Jesus Christ, July 4th, 1908 (Youngwood, Penn.: Reorganized Church of Jesus Christ)
