= Harshmanites =

Christian sect

Church of Jesus Christ (Harshmanites)
Founder
- Reverend S.R. Harshman

Regions with significant populations
- Illinois, United States

Religions
- Christianity

Scriptures
- Christian Bible

Languages
- English

The Church of Jesus Christ in Sullivan, Illinois, United States, colloquially known as the "Harshmanite Church", is a small Christian sect founded out of the Holiness movement. It numbers approximately 100 members.

== Foundation ==
The church was founded in 1871. The Reverend Samuel Rufus Harshman (November 30, 1841 – January 9, 1912), who organized the church, had a dairy herd and ran a delivery wagon in Sullivan, Illinois to supply fresh milk for 5 cents a quart. Harshman was a minister of the Methodist Episcopal Church, but did not believe the Methodist church was sufficiently pacifist. For this reason, he founded a separate church. One of the church's basic principles is to follow Christ's command to "love thy neighbor as thyself," which it interprets as prohibiting violence.

== History ==
During World War I, there was so much hostility to the church that its members could not find jobs. Some of them formed a small factory, employing church and non-church workers, that made ladies' aprons, candy, and later branched into garden tractors and tools. One night the Harshmanite church was painted yellow, a reference to cowardice. An 82-year-old assistant minister was knocked down. However, the Harshmanites would not prosecute on the basis that such an undertaking was proscribed by the biblical statement: "Vengeance is mine, saith the Lord".

In response to the depression of the 1930s, the church members felt that Federal relief projects would not bring lasting prosperity. They expanded their "Community Industries" as a way to provide employment. During World War II the candy operation was unable to obtain sugar unless it agreed to sell some of its products to the armed forces, and a small amount was sold to the Air Force to be including in emergency survivor kits. The church also sold ladies dresses for use by women in the Armed Forces. For these reasons, the United States Court of Appeals for the Seventh Circuit decided on 9 December 1954 that the church had contributed to the war effort and its members could therefore not be considered conscientious objectors. This was later reversed, and members of the church who refused induction into the armed forces were again treated as Conscientious Objectors.

In 1955 a member of the church declined to use the word "solemnly" in affirming to tell the truth in court. The court refused his testimony. However, an appeals court found that he was not required to use this word, or any particular form of oath, but only "a form or statement which impresses upon the mind and conscience of a witness the necessity for telling the truth."

Community Industries achieved no small measure of success for a time. In 1964 it had assets of approximately $3,800,000.00 and about 400 employees. Following losses suffered in the recession of 1957-58, however, its business declined, and after filing for Chapter 11 bankruptcy in 1966, it was subsequently dissolved. Some of its divisions apparently continued operations under new names or ownership, such as Agri-Fab, Inc..
