= Frederick Niels Larsen =

American church leader (1932–2019)

- Frederick Niels Larsen - Previous President of the Remnant Church of Jesus Christ of Latter Day Saints

President of the High Priesthood/Prophet
- April 6, 2002 – April 26, 2019
- Predecessor: W. Wallace Smith
- Successor: Terry W. Patience

President of the High Priests Quorum
- April 8, 2001 – April 6, 2002

Personal details
- Born: January 15, 1932; Kansas City, Missouri, United States
- Died: April 26, 2019 (aged 87); Independence, Missouri, United States
- Alma mater: Graceland College
- Spouse(s): Mary Louise Malott
- Children: 5
- Parents: Edward J. Larsen; Lois A. Smith

Frederick Niels Larsen (January 15, 1932 – April 26, 2019) was the President of the High Priesthood of the Remnant Church of Jesus Christ of Latter Day Saints and the great grandson of Joseph Smith III.

== Early life ==
Frederick Niels Larsen was born January 15, 1932, in the house occupied by his grandfather, Frederick M. Smith. The house in Kansas City, Missouri was the home of his parents Edward J. Larsen, a Danish immigrant and Lois A. (Smith) Larsen, daughter of the President/Prophet. The family moved to a 20-acre farm in East Independence, Missouri in 1937.

== Education ==
Larsen attended eight years at the DeKalb grade school located adjacent to the front yard of the farm home. After one year at the Independence Junior High School and one year at the William Chrisman High School the family moved to Santa Ana, California where Larsen attended Garden Grove Union High School, graduating in 1950.

Larsen attended Graceland College in Lamoni, Iowa and the University of Kansas City, Missouri. He concentrated his interests in the physical sciences and graduated in 1959 with a bachelor of science degree in chemistry.

== Work experience ==
While attending college he worked in the analytical laboratories of the Lake City Arsenal, the Great Lakes Pipeline Co., ChemAgro Corporation, and the Bendix Corporation. He retired from Bendix in 1994 after 35 years of service. Larsen earlier served as a consultant in the field of polymer science at the Lawrence Radiation Laboratory in Livermore, California in 1975 and 1976. After “retirement” he joined his brother Daniel in a capital venture company, Infinity Inc., and assisted in building wastewater treatment plants in Chanute, Kansas and Cheyenne, Wyoming. Larsen also worked with the City of Independence Police Department’s Crime Scene Unit, where as a forensic chemist for at least 5 years he analyzed illicit drugs and methamphetamine labs for the city and the Jackson County Drug Task Force.

== Personal life ==
Larsen married Mary Louise Malott and they had five children, Larry, Linda, Luann, Brian, and Stephen, and ten grandchildren.

== Latter Day Saint affiliations ==
Larsen grew up as a member of the Reorganized Church of Jesus Christ of Latter Day Saints (later called the Community of Christ). Prior to 1996 the RLDS church followed the doctrine of lineal succession, where certain key church positions, such as President of the Church and the Presiding Patriarch, were held by right of lineal inheritance.

As a descendant of Joseph Smith, Larsen had a close association with those leaders in the RLDS Church. He was blessed as a baby and confirmed a member of the RLDS church by his grandfather, Frederick M. Smith; ordained to the office of Priest in 1956 by Israel A. Smith, his great uncle; ordained to the office of Elder by W. Wallace Smith, his great uncle and he and Mary received their Patriarchal Blessings by Elbert A. Smith, a second cousin. Larsen would also serve as the minister of the East Alton and Beacon Heights RLDS branches in Independence.

However, in 1984 he ended his active membership in the RLDS Church. He began to attend the Blue Springs Restoration branch and the Conference of Restoration Elders in 1996. The Restoration Branches were formed in the 1980s by members of the RLDS church in a reaction against the approval of ordination of women by the RLDS 1984 world conference.

Larsen was one of the twelve signers of the “Proclamation and Invitation to the Faithful” in May 1999, which helped lead to the creation of the Remnant Church of Jesus Christ of Latter Day Saints on April 6, 2000.

On April 8, 2001, Larsen was made a High Priest and set apart as President of the High Priests Quorum of the Remnant Church. In April 2002, Larsen, as a descendant of Joseph Smith, was chosen to become the President of the High Priesthood and sustained as the President of the Church.

== Death and succession ==
Larsen died on April 26, 2019. Following his death, Terry W. Patience became President of the High Priesthood/Prophet/President.
