= First Presidency =

Highest governing body of the Latter Day Saint movement

Among many churches in the Latter Day Saint movement, the First Presidency (also known as the Quorum of the Presidency of the Church) is the highest presiding or governing body. Present-day denominations of the movement led by a First Presidency include the Church of Jesus Christ of Latter-day Saints (LDS Church), the Community of Christ, Remnant Church of Jesus Christ of Latter Day Saints, and the Righteous Branch of the Church of Jesus Christ of Latter-Day Saints.

When the Church of Christ was organized on April 6, 1830, Joseph Smith and Oliver Cowdery led the church in their capacity as elders. Smith established the inaugural First Presidency on March 8, 1832, with the ordinations of Jesse Gause and Sidney Rigdon as his counselors. The term "first presidency," though used at least as early as 1834, did not become standard until 1838. The presidency was to exercise authority over the entire church, whereas the jurisdictions of the Twelve Apostles and the Seventy were the outlying areas outside of the gathering places where the church had been organized on a more permanent basis.

After the death of Smith in 1844, First Presidencies were reorganized by Brigham Young for the LDS Church, by Rigdon for the Rigdonites (now defunct), by Joseph Smith III for the Reorganized Church of Jesus Christ of Latter Day Saints (now Community of Christ), by James J. Strang for the Church of Jesus Christ of Latter Day Saints (Strangite), and by William Bickerton for The Church of Jesus Christ, although the latter two organizations have not had a First Presidency for much of their history.

== LDS Church ==
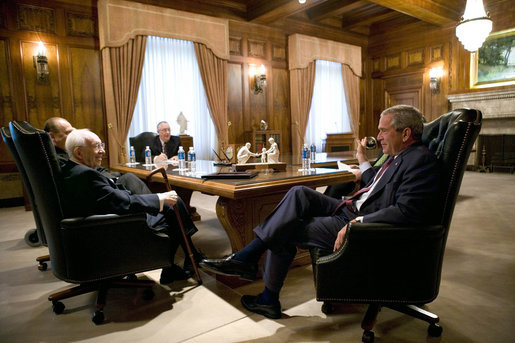
George W. Bush (right) meets with the LDS Church First Presidency in August 2006 in the Church Administration Building. Seated clockwise are: Gordon B. Hinckley, President; Thomas S. Monson, First Counselor (obscured); James E. Faust, Second Counselor (obscured); and F. Michael Watson, then Secretary to the First Presidency. Since this picture was taken, Hinckley, Faust, and Monson have died and the First Presidency has been reorganized.

In the LDS Church, the First Presidency is the presiding, or governing authority of the church. It usually consists of the President of the Church and two counselors, although up to eight counselors have on occasion been included in the presidency at the same time. The counselors assist the church president and work closely with him in guiding the entire church.

Like the church president and President of the Quorum of the Twelve Apostles, counselors in the First Presidency are referred to by the title "President"; he and his counselors are referred to as President Dallin H. Oaks, President Henry B. Eyring, and President D. Todd Christofferson. All members of the First Presidency are "sustained" by the membership of the church as prophets, seers, and revelators.

Any worthy high priest within the church may serve as a counselor in the First Presidency, though most of its members have been chosen from among the Quorum of the Twelve Apostles. Charles W. Nibley, for example, was a counselor to Heber J. Grant without ever being ordained to the priesthood office of apostle.

In the case of an infirm president, his counselors may be called upon to perform more of his duties. If needed, any number of additional counselors may be called to assist them, though the president of the church still remains the only person on the earth authorized to use all priesthood keys.

Counselors serve in the First Presidency until their own deaths, until the death of the church president who called them, or until they are released by the church president. The death of a church president dissolves the First Presidency, and leaves the President of the Quorum of the Twelve Apostles as the senior leader of the church.

The death or release of a counselor does not dissolve the First Presidency.

Often, the surviving counselors of the late president will be called as counselors in the new First Presidency, but a notably infirm counselor may revert to his place among the Twelve Apostles with a healthier man called as counselor in his place. On the death or release of a first counselor, the second counselor usually succeeds and a new second counselor is named. Although this is a fairly common occurrence, there are no hard and fast rules about such practices and each president is free to choose the counselors he prefers.

== Community of Christ ==
The First Presidency is the highest leadership or priesthood quorum of the Community of Christ. Normally the First Presidency consists of the Prophet-President of the church and two counselors.

In 1860 with the reorganization of the First Presidency, Joseph Smith III became the second Prophet-President of this church and also President of a new First Presidency. William Marks became Smith's First Counselor.

The First Presidency of Community of Christ differs from the First Presidency of the LDS Church, where the church president is always the senior-most member of the Quorum of the Twelve Apostles. In the Community of Christ, each new church president has generally been "designated" as the successor by God through revelation received by the preceding church president (while still in that role). The Counselors in the First Presidency are then chosen by the church president and are occasionally, but not required, to be former or current members of the Council of Twelve Apostles. In addition, the death of the Prophet-President does not dissolve the First Presidency, which continues on as the church's executive council in the persons of the remaining two presidents until a Prophet-President is called. The two members who were counselors to the Prophet-President, cease to be counselors during this time. Upon ordination of the Prophet-President, the former First Presidency is dissolved, and upon ordination of the two he calls to be his counselors, to the office of president, the First Presidency is then deemed reorganized. Members of the First Presidency are not generally considered to be members of the Council of Twelve Apostles or holding the priesthood office of apostle, regardless of previous calling.

Prior to 1996, all prophet-presidents were descendants of the movement's founder, Joseph Smith. This pattern was broken by Wallace B. Smith, who designated W. Grant McMurray church president. McMurray, in turn, resigned the church presidency in 2004 without designating a successor. A joint council of church leaders led by the Council of Twelve Apostles announced in March 2005 the name of Stephen M. Veazey as Prophet-President. Veazey had been serving as president of the Council of Twelve. Delegates elected to a special World Conference of the church approved Veazey and he was ordained as the 8th president of the High Priesthood, Prophet, and President of the Church on June 3, 2005.

On June 4, 2005 with the ordinations of Kenneth N. Robinson and David D. Schaal as presidents of the church and counselors to the president, the First Presidency was reorganized.

On March 27, 2007, Robinson retired from his position in the First Presidency and Becky Savage was ordained into the First Presidency. She is the first female to sit on the First Presidency.

Unlike most Latter Day Saint denominations with a First Presidency, the counselors in the First Presidency of the Community of Christ are no longer designated "first" and "second" counselors.

Current members of the First Presidency:

- President Stephen M. Veazey (President of the High Priesthood & of the Church)
- President Becky L. Savage (Counselor to the president)

== Remnant Church of Jesus Christ of Latter Day Saints ==
A First Presidency also leads the Remnant Church of Jesus Christ of Latter Day Saints, which was formed primarily out of discontent with changes in the Reorganized Church of Jesus Christ of Latter Day Saints and seeks to be a "renewal" of that church prior to those changes. The First Presidency consists of three High Priests chosen by the voice of the Church; a president and two counselors. The president is selected by revelation, Jewish Laws of Inheritance, and vote of the General Conference of the Church. The president has the right to choose his own counselors but they must also be sustained by vote of the general conference. The first president following the schism with the Reorganized Church of Jesus Christ of Latter Day Saints was Frederick Niels Larsen, a direct descendant (maternal 2nd great-grandson) of Joseph Smith. His successor is Terry W. Patience, whose first and second counselors are Michael Hogan and David Van Fleet.

== The Church of Jesus Christ (Bickertonite) ==
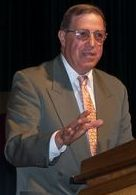
Paul Palmieri, president of The Church of Jesus Christ from 2005 until 2018

Within The Church of Jesus Christ, the president of the church and his two counselors are elected by the general priesthood in conference and selected from amongst the Quorum of Twelve Apostles. The president of the church, while being an ordained apostle, functions as the chief operating officer, overseeing the general operations of the church.

== See also ==
- List of sects in the Latter Day Saint movement
