= Primitive Church of Jesus Christ (Bickertonite) =

The Primitive Church of Jesus Christ was a schismatic sect that was formed in 1914 by and from dissenting members of The Church of Jesus Christ (Bickertonite). Like its parent church, the Primitive Church of Jesus Christ was a Rigdonite and Bickertonite organization: it traced its claim of succession to Latter Day Saint movement founder Joseph Smith through Sidney Rigdon and William Bickerton.

== History ==
In 1914, a dispute emerged in the Bickertonite church as to the proper leadership structure of their church. Some members, led by William Cadman, argued that the church should be led by a First Presidency and Quorum of the Twelve, while others maintained that there should be no First Presidency in the church because Jesus' original church was simply headed by twelve apostles. Church apostle James Caldwell and other dissenters who felt that the First Presidency was a deviation from Christ's original church left the church and established the Primitive Church of Jesus Christ. Caldwell and the other dissenters also disagreed with Cadman about the truth of Joseph Smith's First Vision. Caldwell and his followers did not believe that the First Vision took place, although they did believe that Joseph Smith was a prophet and that he was inspired by God to translate the Book of Mormon.

Caldwell and his followers referred to members of their parent church as "Cadmanites", because it was led by William Cadman.

At the organization of the church in Washington, Pennsylvania, Caldwell was elected as the first president of the church, and he was succeeded by his nephew, Lawrence Dias. The church was strongly opposed to plural marriage, plurality of gods, and baptism for the dead.

The Primitive Church of Jesus Christ eventually merged with the Reorganized Church of Jesus Christ, another schismatic Bickertonite sect that had been created in 1907. By the 1970s, the combined church had dwindled to a single congregation in Erie, Pennsylvania. The church is believed to be defunct, leaving the Church of Jesus Christ in Monongahela, Pennsylvania as the only surviving Rigdonite–Bickertonite sect.
