= William Bickerton =

Leader of Latter Day Saint movement

- Bickerton in 1905, just prior to death.

3rd President of the Church The Church of Jesus Christ
- July 1862 – July 1880
- Predecessor: Sidney Rigdon
- Successor: William Cadman

Personal details
- Born: January 15, 1815; Kyloe, Northumberland, England
- Died: February 17, 1905 (aged 90); St. John, Kansas, United States
- Resting place: Fairview Park Cemetery; 38.0078°N 98.7457°W
- Spouse(s): Dorothy Breminger (1843–1863); Charlotte Rodgers Hibbs (1863–1880)
- Children: By Dorothy; James Bickerton; Eliza Ann; Clara Virginia; Angeline Ann; Josephine; Florence; By Charlotte; William Alma
- Parents: Thomas Bickerton; Isabella Hope

William Bickerton (January 15, 1815 – February 17, 1905) was a leader in the Latter Day Saint movement after the 1844 succession crisis. In 1862, Bickerton became the founding president of the church now known as The Church of Jesus Christ (Bickertonite), which is one of many churches that claim to be a continuation of the Church of Christ founded by Joseph Smith Jr in 1830.

== Early life ==
Bickerton was born in Kyloe, Northumberland, England, the seventh of twelve children of Thomas Bickerton (1762-1828) and Isabella Hope Bickerton (1781-1857). Bickerton immigrated to the United States on June 20, 1831 and became a coal miner in, first, Virginia and then Pennsylvania.

== Follower of Sidney Rigdon ==
Following Smith's death in 1844, a number of Latter Day Saint leaders, including Brigham Young, Sidney Rigdon, and James Strang, claimed to be Smith's rightful successor to lead the Church of Jesus Christ of Latter Day Saints, which Smith had founded in 1830 as the Church of Christ. The Latter Day Saints who followed Rigdon separated themselves from the followers of Young. While the group led by Young remained in Nauvoo, Illinois, and eventually settled in Utah; Rigdon and his followers settled near Pittsburgh, Pennsylvania. On April 6, 1845, Rigdon presided over a conference of the Church of Christ (Rigdonite), which he claimed was the rightful continuation of the church founded by Smith.

Bickerton was not a Latter Day Saint during Smith's lifetime. Rather, he was a practicing Methodist who was converted to the Church of Christ (Rigdonite) after he and his wife Dorothy attended a Rigdonite meeting in Limetown, Union Township, Washington County, Pennsylvania in April 1845. Bickerton was baptized a member of Rigdon’s church in Pittsburgh in June 1845. Later that same year, Bickerton was ordained an elder and shortly after an evangelist in the church.

At a general conference of the church held that fall in Philadelphia, Rigdon announced that the church would re-establish a communitarian society on what was named "Adventure Farm" near Greencastle, Pennsylvania. Many of Rigdon's followers, including Bickerton, opposed moving the headquarters of the church. By 1847, disagreement among the Rigdonites had led to the virtual disintegration of Rigdon's church. Several prominent members, including William E. McLellin and Benjamin Winchester, separated from the church and established a rival organization centered on the leadership of David Whitmer. However, some followers of Rigdon, including Bickerton, refused to join the dissenters.

== Establishing The Church of Jesus Christ ==
Bickerton remained in Monongahela, Pennsylvania, and never moved to Greencastle with Rigdon. By April 1847, the Adventure Farm community had collapsed and Rigdon had abandoned his followers. Bickerton described his situation upon the collapse of the Rigdonite church:

The Church [had become] disorganized. Here I was left to myself. I paused to know what course to pursue. I knew my calling was from Heaven, and I also knew that a man cannot build up the Church of Christ without divine commandment from the Lord, for it would only be sectarianism, and man's authority. But the Lord did not leave me; no, he showed me a vision, and in the vision I was on the highest mountain on the earth; and he told me that if I did not preach the gospel I would fall into a dreadful chasm below, the sight thereof was awful. I moved with fear, having the Holy Spirit with me. Here I was, none to assist me, and without learning, popular opinion against me, and the Salt Lake Mormons stood in the way. I could not turn back unto Methodism again. No, I knew they had not the gospel. I stood in contemplation. The chasm was before me, no other alternative but to do my duty to God and man. I went ahead preaching repentance towards God, and faith in the Lord Jesus Christ. Some believed my testimony and were baptized, and we met together [and] the Lord met with us ....

Bickerton maintained his faith in the Restoration and led a small congregation of 9 in West Elizabeth, Pennsylvania. After writing to the LDS church, Bickerton and his congregation were visited by two LDS missionaries who baptized them all and, on 25 May 1851, established them as a branch of the LDS church. They also ordained Bickerton an elder and presiding minister in the new West Elizabeth congregation of the LDS Church. In early 1852 Bickerton attended a church leadership conference where he was made aware of the church's beliefs about plural marriage. Bickerton remarked, "If the approval of God were to come to me by accepting the doctrine of polygamy, I prefer the displeasure of God." On 10 March 1852 Bickerton announced to his congregation that he was disassociating himself from the LDS church because of its adherence to doctrines that he felt could not be substantiated in the Bible or the Book of Mormon, particularly plural marriage. An unknown number of people chose to follow him.

Bickerton engaged in public preaching and met with his growing congregation in houses and, by the end of 1854, his church had around 60 members.

On 5 July 1859, Bickerton was ordained as head of the church by his followers and called a Prophet and Seer. At a conference of believers in Green Oak (also known as Greenock), Pennsylvania, in July 1862, leaders of several branches of the faith in Pennsylvania, Ohio and Virginia came together and formally organized what they called The Church of Jesus Christ. Bickerton presided over the conference and reorganized the First Presidency and Quorum of the Twelve. Because of Bickerton's leadership, past and present members of this church are sometimes referred to by historians as "Bickertonites", and The Church of Jesus Christ has been nicknamed the "Bickertonite church" or the "Bickerton organization".

== Life in Kansas and a schism in the church ==
At a conference in 1872 in West Elizabeth, Bickerton was chosen to spend the remainder of his days on missionary work. His missionary endeavors culminated in 1875: Bickerton, accompanied by approximately 35 to 40 families of the church, moved to Kansas to found the Zion Valley Colony, which later became the town of St. John, Kansas. The distance between Bickerton's Kansas colony and the remainder of his church in Pittsburgh, eventually led by William Cadman, as well as other disagreements over property, led to growing division within the church.

In June 1879, charges of adultery were brought against Bickerton by a member of the church in Kansas and the accuser pressed the issue at a church meeting in 1880 A local church council decision on 7 July 1880 went against Bickerton and his membership of the church was revoked along with all his callings whilst at the same time anyone who spoke in his defence was excommunicated. Bickerton maintained his innocence but Cadman believed the accusations leading to the two of them holding rival church conferences in St. John in July 1880. On 15 July 1880 Cadman began a public inquiry into the accusations but left for Pennsylvania when it ruled Bickerton innocent of adultery. Following this Bickerton continued leading his followers, a majority of whom were in Kansas, in opposition to Cadman, whose followers were mainly in Pennsylvania.

In the 1890s Bickerton and his followers made repeated missionary trips to Oklahoma to attempt to convert Native Americans into his church which was referred to colloquially as the "Stafford County Saints".

In 1902, he reconciled with Cadman and was reinstated in the church with Cadman now the undisputed leader (though Bickerton considered his own leadership to have ended in 1902 not 1880) and Bickerton remained a faithful church member until he died on February 17, 1905, a week after suffering injuries in a fire.

== Marriage and family ==
Bickerton married Dorothy Breminger (1826-1863) in 1843 in Allegheny County, Pennsylvania; the couple had one son, James, and five daughters: Eliza Ann, Clara Virginia, Angeline Ann, Josephine, and Florence. After the death of Dorothy, Bickerton married his second wife, Charlotte Rodgers Morgan Hibbs (1819-1895), on July 8, 1863. Charlotte bore him one child, William Alma. Charlotte briefly moved to Kansas to join her husband when he founded Zion Valley but moved back to Pennsylvania in 1877. Bickerton sued for divorce from her in 1880 and this was granted on 27 August 1880.

Bickerton died at St. John, Stafford County, Kansas, at the age of 90 as a member and leader of the church he organized in 1862. He is buried in the Fairview Cemetery in St. John.

== See also ==
- Primitive Church of Jesus Christ (Bickertonite)
- Reorganized Church of Jesus Christ (Bickertonite)

== Notes ==
Religious titles
Preceded by Sidney Rigdon	President of the Church; The Church of Jesus Christ (Bickertonite); July 1862 – July 1880	Succeeded by William Cadman
