= The Church of Jesus Christ (Bickertonite) =

Christian religious denomination

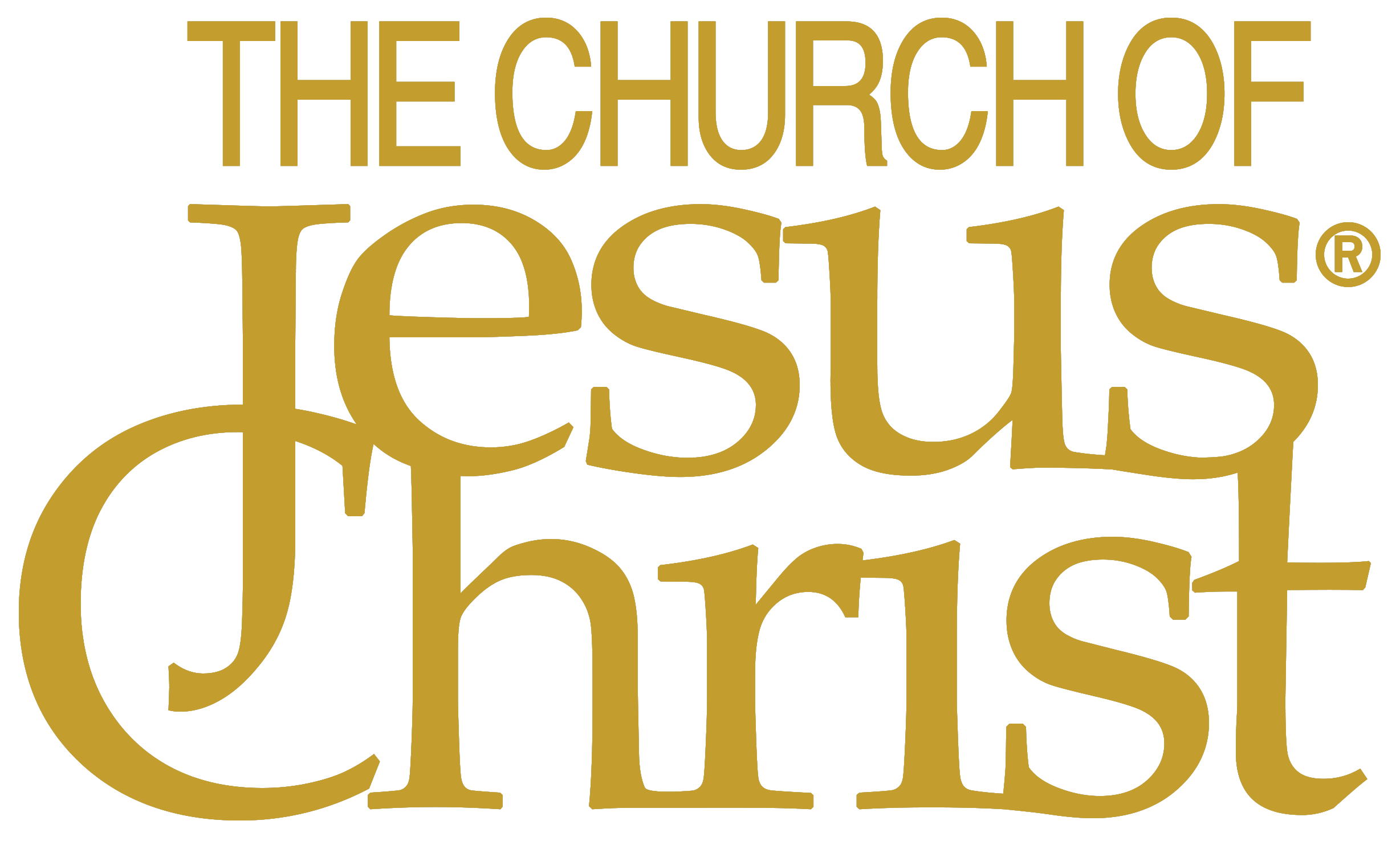
- Classification: Restorationist
- Region: Worldwide
- Headquarters: Monongahela, Pennsylvania
- Origin: April 6, 1830; Manchester or Fayette, New York, United States
- Members: 23,199
- Official website: thechurchofjesuschrist.org

The Church of Jesus Christ is an international Christian religious denomination that is headquartered in Monongahela, Pennsylvania, United States. The church is a Christian Restorationist church with origins in the Latter Day Saint movement and accepts the Book of Mormon as scripture. The church considers itself the gospel restored, or the original church and good news as established by Jesus Christ in the New Testament, restored upon the earth. It also claims to be the spiritual successor to the Church of Christ, organized by Joseph Smith on April 6, 1830. The church sees Sidney Rigdon as Smith's rightful successor following the assassination of Smith because Rigdon was Smith's first counselor in the First Presidency. The church is not officially affiliated with any other church, organization or denomination.

As of August 2023, church membership totaled 22,992. The Church of Jesus Christ is considered "the third largest Restoration church to have resulted from the 1844 succession crisis", describing Joseph Smith's death that year without a clear line of succession. It has sometimes been referred to as a "Bickertonite church" or "Rigdonite organization" based upon the church's historical succession through William Bickerton and Sidney Rigdon and partly to distinguish from other churches with similar names. However, the church does not use these terms in referring to itself as it believes it must be named after Jesus Christ alone.

The stated purpose of the church is "to share the gift of salvation through Jesus Christ, His promises and His redeeming love with all nations and races throughout the world and to carry out God’s plans in the latter days."

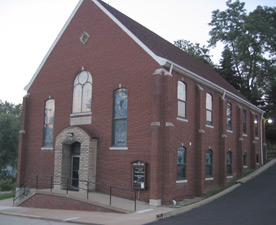
The Church of Jesus Christ's historic chapel in Monongahela, Pennsylvania

== Mission and purpose ==
Stated mission:

- "The Church of Jesus Christ will teach the Gospel to all nations, baptizing them in the name of the Father, and of the Son, and of the Holy Ghost, teaching them to observe all things commanded by Jesus Christ, while working to draw Israel to Christ through efforts focused on the indigenous peoples of North, Central, and South America."

Stated purpose:

- "To fulfill the plan of God by bringing salvation through Christ to all people."

Stated vision:

- "Living and worshipping in unity and righteousness will result in the fullness of God’s spirit and power among the saints, culminating in continuous growth of the Church and fulfillment of Christ’s promises concerning His kingdom on Earth."

== Use of descriptive terms ==
The church refers to itself only as "The Church of Jesus Christ", its legal and official name. This name comes from Jesus Christ's words in the text of the Book of Mormon, who names his church after himself. The Church of Jesus Christ believes itself to be the restored self-same church as established in both the New Testament and Book of Mormon. The belief system of being Jesus Christ's church upon the earth is the reason for avoiding any other names as descriptive terms, even in a historical context.

The church is sometimes referred to as a "Bickertonite" or "Rigdonite" organization by non-members, and occasionally used in scholarly works to distinguish from other denominations with similar names. These terms have reference to the church tracing its historical succession through William Bickerton and Sidney Rigdon. The use of these terms are discouraged by the church as detracting from Jesus Christ. Although the church acknowledges the Book of Mormon to be scripture, it does not consider itself to be a "Mormon church" as it is distinct from the largest Latter Day Saint church, based in Utah.

== History ==
William Bickerton

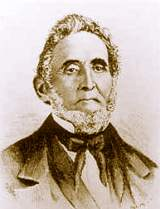
Sidney Rigdon

The Church of Jesus Christ sees itself as a continuation of the Church of Christ, which was the original church organization established by Joseph Smith informally in 1829 and then as a legal entity on April 6, 1830, in northwestern New York. On April 6, 1830, Smith, Oliver Cowdery, and a group of approximately 30 believers met to formally organize the Church of Christ into a legal institution. Traditionally, this is said to have occurred at the home of Peter Whitmer Sr. in Fayette, New York, but some early accounts place it in Manchester. Soon after this formal organization, small branches were formally established in Fayette, Manchester and Colesville.

Smith and his associates intended that the Church of Christ would be a restoration of the 1st-century Christian church, which Smith taught had fallen from God's favor and authority because of a Great Apostasy. In late 1830, Smith envisioned a "city of Zion" in Native American lands near Independence, Missouri. In October 1830, he sent his second-in-command Oliver Cowdery and others on a mission to the area. Passing through Kirtland, Ohio, the missionaries converted a congregation of Disciples of Christ led by Sidney Rigdon, and in 1831, Smith decided to temporarily move his followers to Kirtland until the Missouri area could be colonized. The church headquarters remained in Kirtland from 1831 to 1838.

Many of Smith's followers attempted to colonize Missouri throughout the 1830s, and Smith himself moved there in 1838. The church faced political and military opposition by other Missouri settlers. After the Mormon War of 1838, the religion was expelled from Missouri under an Extermination Order signed by the governor. The church then established its new headquarters in Nauvoo, Illinois, a city they built on drained swampland by the Mississippi River, where Smith served as mayor. There, the church thrived until Smith and his brother Hyrum were killed by a mob in 1844. They were in prison awaiting trial for crimes related to the destruction of the printing press of the Nauvoo Expositor. At the time, Smith was a minor candidate for President of the United States with Rigdon as his running mate.

After Smith was killed in 1844, there was confusion about who should succeed him in leading the church. Many of the leaders of the church were absent from Nauvoo at the time of his death, serving as missionaries or working on Smith's presidential campaign. Rigdon was in Pittsburgh, Pennsylvania, when he heard of Smith's death, and hurried back to Nauvoo, becoming one of the first church leaders to return. He quickly announced that he had the right to lead the church as its "guardian" until proper proceedings could decide the next church president, and that the Quorum of the Twelve did not have the right to lead the church. Rigdon, like the Twelve, had been ordained by Smith as a "prophet, seer, and revelator".

The Church of Jesus Christ maintains that the First Presidency had made nearly all the major decisions and led the Church of Christ prior to Smith's death, and as first counselor to Smith at the time of Smith's death, Rigdon should naturally have been the leader of the church after Smith's death.

The Latter Day Saints who followed Rigdon separated themselves from the majority of the members, who followed Brigham Young and the Quorum of the Twelve. Rigdon and his followers settled in Monongahela, Pennsylvania. On April 6, 1845, Rigdon presided over a conference of the Church of Christ, which he saw as the rightful continuation of the church founded by Smith. William Bickerton was among those converted by Rigdon's preaching, and was baptized at Monongahela in 1845. Later that same year, Bickerton was ordained an elder and shortly after an evangelist in the church. Rigdon's organization disbanded shortly afterwards.

Bickerton continued to preach and by May 1851 a branch of the church was organized under Bickerton's leadership in West Elizabeth, Pennsylvania. At a conference on July 9, 1861, it was recorded that twelve of their number were chosen and called by the Holy Spirit to be apostles. The church was incorporated in Pittsburgh in June 1865 with the legal name, "Church of Jesus Christ of Green Oak, Pennsylvania." On April 5, 1941, the church was granted the name of "The Church of Jesus Christ" by Washington County, Pennsylvania. The church today is registered as "The Church of Jesus Christ" in the corporate registry of the state of Pennsylvania.

== Organizational structure and membership ==
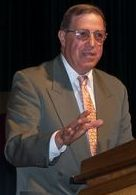
Apostle Paul Palmieri, previous president of The Church of Jesus Christ

The Church of Jesus Christ is organized with twelve apostles, seventy evangelists (see Quorum of Seventy Evangelists), and elders as ordained offices within the general priesthood. Teachers, deacons and deaconesses are also ordained offices within the church. The church structures itself as closely as possible to the New Testament church according to the 4th and 5th articles of the Faith and Doctrine of The Church of Jesus Christ. Apostles lead the church; evangelists preach to the world; elders serve their various branches and missions. Teachers visit the membership, teach, and preach or lead services when elders are not present. All of these offices are considered the "ministry" of the church.

The church presidency is composed of apostles including the president of the church, first and second counselors. The president of the church and his two counselors are elected by the general priesthood in conference and selected from among the Quorum of Twelve Apostles. The president of the church, while being an ordained apostle, along with his counselors, also apostles, oversee the general operations of the church. In contrast, the Quorum of Twelve Apostles has its own president and officers elected among themselves, independent of the general priesthood. The Quorum of Twelve is primarily responsible for guiding the spiritual growth and development of the church in general, acting as advisers to key operating committees.

Today, The Church of Jesus Christ has a total worldwide membership of 23,200, with nearly 3,000 located in the United States.

== Doctrines and practices ==
The Church of Jesus Christ is independent of any other church in the Latter Day Saint movement. The Church of Jesus Christ has long rejected plural marriage, celestial marriage, two separate priesthoods, and many other doctrines taught by some other Latter Day Saint movement denominations. The Church of Jesus Christ teaches that many of the doctrines and revelations Joseph Smith taught were not from God and were contrary to the Bible and the Book of Mormon. The church also teaches that many of the Latter Day Saint denominations fell into error by following these revelations. The Church of Jesus Christ views the nature of God as explained in the Bible and Book of Mormon, which the church distinguishes from the views taught by the Church of Jesus Christ of Latter-day Saints.

=== Nature of God ===
Godhead: The Church of Jesus Christ believes, "...in God, the Eternal Father, and His Son, Jesus Christ, and the Holy Spirit. These three are the great matchless power that rules all things visible and invisible, for it is of Him and through Him that we receive all things both for this life, and that which is to come."

- God the Father: God the Father, or God Almighty, is believed to be a personage of Glory.
- Jesus Christ: Jesus Christ is the Son of God, the "...express image of the Father..." who "...came from the bosom of the Father, was born of the Virgin Mary...became man and suffered and died for the sins of the whole world." The church believes in the physical life, crucifixion, resurrection and ascension of Jesus Christ who they believe now sits at the right hand of God the Father.
- Holy Spirit: The Holy Spirit is considered to be a spirit and the very mind of the Father and the Son. He is not considered to be a personage itself, but can take upon himself many forms. "God, through His spirit, can be everywhere. He can observe and penetrate any part of the universe of His creation. This does not mean that God is physically everywhere, but His spirit, which is in communication with all things at all times, is everywhere. It is like the fragrance of a beautiful bouquet of flowers that permeates an entire house, although it is only in one room." It is considered to be the Power, Glory and Witness as referenced in New Testament Scriptures.

=== Scriptures ===
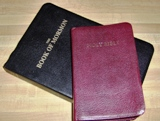
The Church of Jesus Christ prints both a large and small version of the Book of Mormon. Both the King James Version of the Bible and the Book of Mormon are used as scripture.

The Church of Jesus Christ teaches that the New Testament scriptures contain a true description of the church as established by Jesus Christ. The church teaches that this church is set up to be sufficient for life and salvation to all humankind. Both the Bible and Book of Mormon are considered to be the inspired word of God. All doctrines and faith of the church are referenced with these two books. No other books are accepted as scripture.

=== Salvation ===
The Church of Jesus Christ teaches that the church as set up by Christ in the New Testament contains all doctrines and practices essential for salvation. Adherents believe that the church today should contain every element of the early church. Humankind will be punished according to their own sins and not the sins of Adam and Eve. The church believes that in order to obtain salvation, one must obey the Gospel by fulfilling the commandment of Jesus Christ.

=== Principles of the gospel ===
Minister baptizing in Mexico

1. Faith – Members must believe in Jesus Christ, that He died and was resurrected.
2. Repentance – A feeling of sorrow for sin and desire to sin no more.
3. Baptism (Water) – Done by immersion in water in the name of the Father, Son, and Holy Ghost for the remission of sins. Immersion is considered being buried in likeness of the death of Christ and arising in newness of life. The church teaches that baptism must be in a natural body of water such as a river or lake, and not in a pool or other artificial structure.
4. Laying on of hands to receive the Holy Ghost – The priesthood lay hands on the head of the candidate for this reception after the baptism of water.
5. Enduring to the End – Members must strive to serve God to the best of their ability for the rest of their time on this earth.

=== Priesthood and church structure ===
The Church of Jesus Christ teaches that the structure of the early church and that apostles, evangelists, elders, teachers, and deacons should still lead the church today. Apostles, Evangelists, and Elders are called after the holy order of the priesthood of Jesus Christ and have the responsibility to perform ordinances based on the example Jesus Christ provided as recorded in the Bible and The Book of Mormon. These three offices make up "The Priesthood". The leadership is not considered a hierarchy, but rather the church holds that those with greater responsibility are called to greater service, and the most important calling within the church is that of a member. The priesthood is responsible for the spiritual well-being of the church. As with most Restoration denominations, elders are never referred to as "Father" or "Reverend", as the belief of the church is that scripture forbids this practice (Matthew 23:9). Elders and all church officials (including the Church Presidency and Quorum of Apostles) receive no financial remuneration for their activities.

Teachers, deacons, and deaconesses are also called to support the ministry. Teachers, while considered a part of the broader ministry, cannot perform any ordinances. Their responsibilities include visiting the membership, teaching, and preaching or leading services when elders are not present. Deacons and deaconesses visit the sick, widows, and attend to many physical and spiritual duties for each branch of the church. Deaconesses also set the sacrament table and attend to the needs and development of the women of the church. Although women may serve as deaconesses in the church, in accordance with the church's interpretation of the scriptures, only men may become elders. Deaconesses do not have priesthood authority.

Evangelist anointing with oil in Kenya, Africa

In worship services, members of the priesthood do not prepare written sermons prior to the meeting. Instead, the priesthood strives to speak under the inspiration from the Holy Spirit. Each week, church services begin with preaching from the priesthood and generally followed by a testimony portion of the meeting, during which time members of the congregation (and visitors) are given the opportunity to "praise God for what He has done for them."

According to the doctrine of the church, all ordained offices are called to their positions by revelation. No office within the church is paid, including the ministry.

=== Joseph Smith ===
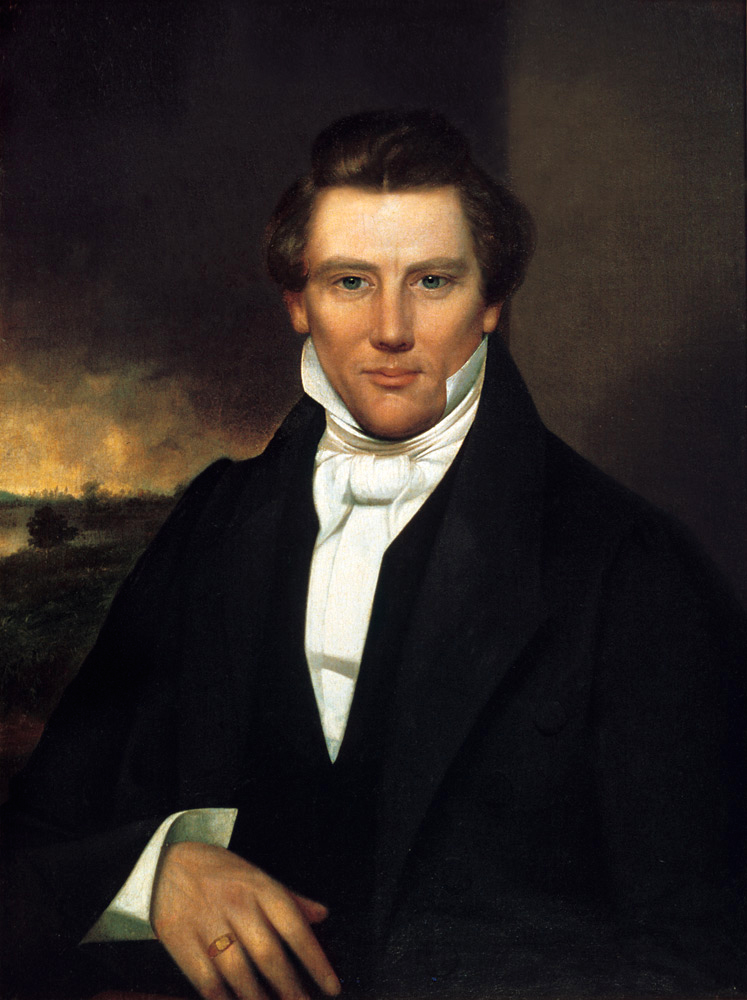
Joseph Smith

The Church of Jesus Christ considers Joseph Smith to have been an instrument in the hands of God in the restoration of the gospel. The Church of Jesus Christ believes that many revelations began to enter into the church through Smith that were contrary to the scriptures and the will of God. In contrast with other Latter Day Saint denominations, the church does not believe that Smith was the "choice seer" predicted by the Book of Mormon (2 Nephi 3:6-7). Its members are still awaiting the coming of the choice seer whom many in the organization believe will be of Native American heritage.

One of the key reasons why The Church of Jesus Christ believes Smith received many revelations contrary to the word of God was described by one of the Three Witnesses to the Book of Mormon, David Whitmer. A revelation received by Smith to go to Toronto for business turned into a bankrupt expedition. Smith then was reportedly given a revelation clarifying that, "Some revelations are of God: some revelations are of men: and some revelations are of the devil." Thus, in order to strictly adhere to God's will, The Church of Jesus Christ only accepts revelation as supported by the Bible and the Book of Mormon. On this matter, church leader William Cadman wrote:

There has been much said about Joseph Smith ... [A]ll people who manifest faith in the Restored Gospel of Jesus Christ, which includes the coming forth of the Book of Mormon, do acknowledge him to be inspired of God when but a youth ... He has been a much accused man, whether truly or falsely, eternity will reveal. If he taught plural marriage ... plural Gods, baptism for the dead, the Book of Mormon does not sustain him, neither does the teachings of our Savior in the New Testament ... The Church of Jesus Christ does not believe such teachings."

=== Ordinances ===
Members of The Church of Jesus Christ perform many ordinances as found in the New Testament and the Book of Mormon. Baptism, the Lord's Supper/Communion, feet washing, and others are all ways to remember Jesus Christ. The church claims these ordinances demonstrate remembrance, love, and humility before God and each other.

Like many Christian denominations, the church uses bread and wine for the Lord's Supper/Communion, which represents the body and blood of Christ, which it believes was sacrificed for the sins of humankind. Although the Book of Mormon provides an example of an appropriate prayer for communion (Moroni 4 and Moroni 5), the ministry does not recite them verbatim and instead follows the "inspiration of the Holy Spirit" for the communion prayers. A first prayer is given prior to passing the bread and then another is offered prior to passing the wine. The communion is administered only to active, baptized members of the church. The wine is served in a communal cup. The ministers serve the congregation by walking around to each person in their seats, first with plate of bread and then with the cup of wine. The bread is not wafers or crackers, but leavened bread that has been broken into small pieces by the ministry during the ordinance. The ministers are the last to partake of the bread and the wine after the congregation has been served.

Foot-washing in the Philippines

Church members follow the ordinance of feet washing (John 13:5) four times a year as a demonstration of personal humility. The church believes that this is a very important ordinance, citing Jesus' statement to Peter: "If I wash thee not, thou hast no part with me." Church members greet each other with a "holy kiss", preferably on the cheek, to signify that they are greeting each other in the love of God, in accordance with the description given in the King James Version of the New Testament. Members of the church believe in the gifts of the Spirit, as described in their scriptures. These include but are not limited to: the word of wisdom, the word of knowledge, faith, healing, prophecy, discernment, witnessing of angels, speaking in tongues, and the interpretation of divers tongues.

=== Other ===
Members of the church refer to each other as "Brother" and "Sister." The church counsels members to be moderate in all things including their dress and appearance.

The church believes that little children have no need of baptism to obtain salvation, as they are without sin, and are commonly blessed by the priesthood. Young people are permitted to join the church when they reach an age of accountability and have a desire to obey the Gospel of Jesus Christ.

Elders perform administration to the sick through the laying on of hands, using oil if the illness is physical.

The church believes that serving God and following Jesus is a "365 day per year activity", not just a Sunday activity. Chapels of the church do not contain altars or crosses.

The Church of Jesus Christ teaches that hymns are often revealed through divine inspiration for the edification of the church. The hymnal The Songs of Zion consists of hymns that were given to a church member, Arlene Lea Buffington, through divine inspiration. The church also uses The Saints Hymnal, which contains many hymns sung in traditional Christian churches as well as hymns of the restoration. Many congregations also use additional hymnals from other Christian organizations.

The church maintains a publishing house in Greensburg, Pennsylvania, and prints its own edition of the Book of Mormon. The church publishes a monthly periodical called The Gospel News.

== Racial integration ==
The Church of Jesus Christ has advocated full racial integration throughout all aspects of the church since its organization in 1862. While North America disputed over civil liberties and racial segregation, the church directed its message towards all races. In 1905, the church suspended an elder for opposing the full integration of all races.

Historian Dale Morgan wrote in 1949: "An interesting feature of the Church's doctrine is that it discriminates in no way against ... members of other racial groups, who are fully admitted to all the privileges of the priesthood. It has taken a strong stand for human rights, and was, for example, uncompromisingly against the Ku Klux Klan during that organization's period of ascendancy after the First World War."

Two of the most prominent leaders of The Church of Jesus Christ were African American during the early and mid 1900s. Apostle John Penn, member of the Quorum of Twelve Apostles from 1910 to 1955, conducted missionary work with many Italian Americans, and was often referred to as "the Italians' Doctor". Matthew Miller, an evangelist ordained in 1937, traveled throughout Canada establishing missions with Native Americans.
