= Clayne L. Pope =

American economist (born 1940)

Clayne L. Pope (born October 29, 1940) is the former Zina Card Williams Young professor of economics at Brigham Young University (BYU) and specializes in 19th century economic history.

Born in Emmett, Idaho, Pope has a bachelor's degree from Brigham Young University (BYU) and an MA and PhD from the University of Chicago. Pope is a member of the Church of Jesus Christ of Latter-day Saints (LDS Church). He served for a time as the president of the BYU 3rd Stake.

Pope has been on the faculty of BYU since 1970. Prior to that he was a lecturer at the University of Michigan for a year. In the summer of 1977 Pope was a visiting lecturer at the College of William and Mary and he was a visiting lecturer at Princeton University in 1979. He also served for a time as the dean of the College of Home Family and Social Sciences at BYU.

Pope has advocated the use of higher prices to reduce energy consumption.

In 2009 a Clayne L. Pope Professorship in Economics was created in the BYU College of Family, Home and Social Sciences. The first recipient was James B. McDonald.

== Publications ==
- The Impact of the Ante-Bellum Tariff of Income Distribution. Arno Press, 1975.
- "The Genealogical Society of Salt Lake City: A Source of Data for Economic and Social Historians" with Larry T. Wimmer in Historical Methods 8 (March 1975) no. 2. p. 51-58.
- "The Church and The Secular World: Freedom and Equality" (with James R. Kearl) in F. Lamond Tullis and Douglas Tobler, ed. Mormonism: A Faith for All Cultures 1978.
- Choices, Rents and Luck: Economic Mobility in 19th Century Utah Households with James R. Kearl. 1986.
- Economy, Society and Public Policy with Larry T. Wimmer. Morton Publishing Company, 1976.
- American Heritage with Frank W. Fox.
- "Precedence and Wealth: Evidence from 19th Century Utah" with David Galenson. 1992
- "The Height of Union Army Recruits" with Sven Wilson in Health and Labor Force Participation Over The Life Cycle: Evidence from the Past Dora L. Costa, ed., January 2003
