= Kirtland Safety Society =

Financial scandal in Latter-day Saint history

Kirtland Safety Society Anti-Banking Company
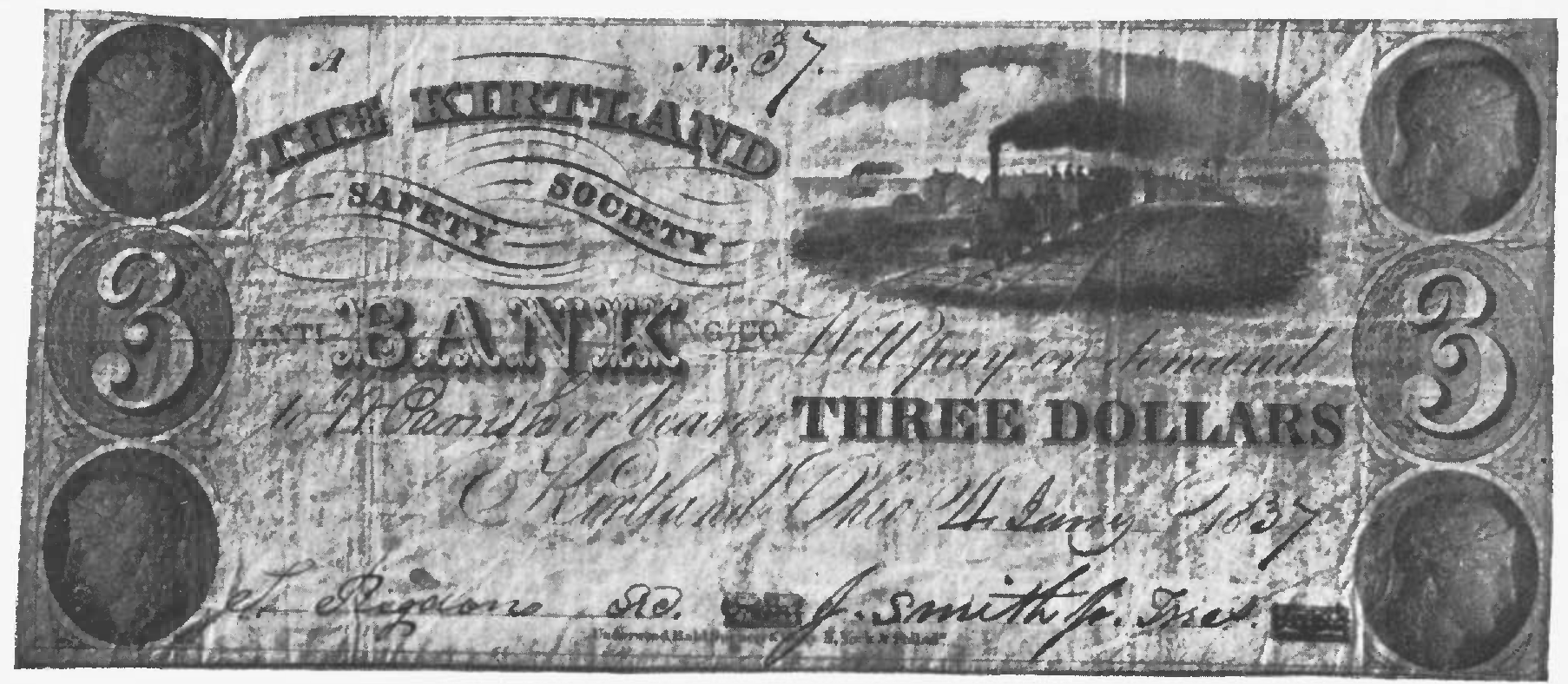
- Bank note issued by the Kirtland Safety Society in early 1837, after its reorganization.
- Type: Joint-stock company
- Industry: Financial services
- Founded: January 2, 1837
- Defunct: November 1837
- Headquarters: Kirtland, Ohio, United States
- Products: Bank notes

The Kirtland Safety Society (KSS) was first proposed as a bank in 1836, and eventually organized on January 2, 1837, as a joint stock company, by leaders and followers of the then-named Church of the Latter-day Saints. According to KSS's 1837 "Articles of Agreement", it was intended to serve the financial needs of the growing Latter Day Saint community in Kirtland, Ohio. Its preamble stated it was:

... for the promotion of our temporal interests, and for the better management of our different occupations, which consist in agriculture, mechanical arts, and merchandising.

However, by November 1837, KSS failed and its business closed. In the aftermath, Joseph Smith, founder of the Latter Day Saint movement, was fined for "running an illegal bank," though he was employed as the institution's Cashier. While Smith appealed the fine and made arrangements to have Oliver Granger settle the affairs of the quasi-bank, many financially harmed Latter Day Saints left the church because they believed Smith had established the institution in order to enrich himself and church leadership.

== Economy in Kirtland ==
By late 1836, many recent Latter Day Saint converts had gathered in Missouri and Kirtland, Ohio. The city of Kirtland experienced a significant population increase, growing from approximately 1,000 people in 1830 to 3,000 in 1836, with a similar increase in surrounding agricultural areas. The population growth was at least partially responsible for a rapid increase in land prices between 1832 and 1837. The average price per acre of land sold in Kirtland rose from approximately $7 in 1832 to $44 in 1837, only to fall back to $17.50 in 1839. (Ludlow, p. 283) Generalized inflation during the period accounted for between 25 and 40 percent of the price increase. Although the church held considerable real estate, estimated at approximately $60,000 in equity by historian Larry T. Wimmer, it also needed liquidity to repay outstanding loans. The credit needs of the church, growing population and ongoing land transactions required a local bank. Banks in the United States in the period before the Civil War issued and often backed their own currency.

== KSS organization ==
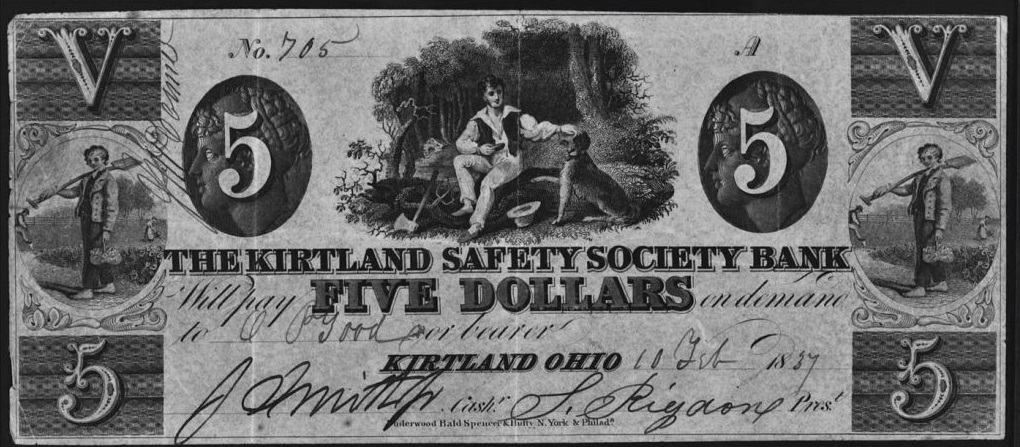
A Kirtland Safety Society bank note for five dollars.

After some discussion by the leadership of the Church, church apostle Orson Hyde went to the Ohio legislature to request a bank charter while Oliver Cowdery went to Philadelphia and acquired plates to print notes for the proposed Kirtland Safety Society bank. On January 2, Hyde returned to Kirtland empty-handed. He had been unable to persuade any legislator to sponsor a bill giving KSS a bank charter. Church president and founder Joseph Smith attributed the lack of sponsorship to disfavor toward the Mormons.

Hyde returned to the Ohio legislature in February with a petition, joined by several non-Mormons, for a bank based on far less capital stock. This time Hyde secured legislative sponsors, and the request was added as an amendment to another bill. However, the bill was defeated by the Ohio legislature. Grandison Newell, a professed antagonist to the Latter Day Saints in general and its president in particular, instigated several lawsuits against the Mormons in Ohio. Newell was close to three legislators who had taken the charter requests under consideration and used his influence to dissuade them.

Although this rejection has been attributed to both political and religious differences, this Ohio legislature was much more restrictive in issuing bank charters than the previous legislative body. The legislature was now dominated by the hard money wing of the Democratic party, the "Jacksonian Democrats". Due to their influence, the legislature refused all applications for bank charters but one during 1836 and 1837, in part because of endemic nationwide problems with land speculation, wildcat banking and counterfeiting.

Under the advice of non-Mormon legal counsel, the Kirtland Safety Society Anti-Banking Company (KSSABC) was formed under revised articles on January 2, 1837 as a joint stock company to serve as a quasi-banking institution. Quasi-banks operated as banks (sometimes in conjunction with other business activities) although they had no formal bank charter. These corporate institutions were not uncommon in Ohio at the time as banking regulations were limited. Whigs went so far as to encourage businesses to operate as quasi-banks. Even after the national bank failure in 1837, there was no widespread opposition to quasi-banks in Ohio until 1873.

"Anti" and "ing" were engraved before and after "Bank"—in smaller typeface—on the printing plates Cowdery had previously purchased in Philadelphia. Subscribers and organizers of the KSSABC were members of the Kirtland community (merchants, farmers, etc.), many of whom became shareholders of the company. Sidney Rigdon served as the KSSABC's chairman and president, Warren Parrish as signatory, secretary and teller; Joseph Smith was cashier. Supporters hoped that they would eventually be able to secure a formal banking charter. In the interim, the KSSABC began issuing notes as a quasi-bank in early January 1837.

The proposed capitalization of the "anti-bank" greatly exceeded the resources that were available from its backers, as noted by historian, Robert Kent Fielding:

As it was projected, there was never the slightest chance that the Kirtland Safety Society anti-Bank-ing Company could succeed. Even though their economy was in jeopardy, it could scarcely have suffered such a devastating blow as that which they were themselves preparing to administer to it. ... The Safety Society proposed no modest project befitting its relative worth and ability to pay. Its organizers launched, instead, a gigantic company capitalized at four million dollars, when the entire capitalization of all the banks in the state of Ohio was only nine and one third million. Such presumption could not have escaped the notice of bankers who would have been led to examine its capital structure more closely. ... according to the articles of incorporation capital stock was to be paid in by subscription but that the amount of payments were left to the discretion of the company managers. Furthermore, total issuance of notes was not prescribed, nor was the relation of notes to capital and assets. The members, to be sure, pledged themselves to redeem the notes and bound themselves individually by their agreement under the penal sum of one hundred thousand dollars. But there was no transfer of property deeds, no power of attorney, no legal pains and penalties. To a banker, the articles fairly shouted: 'this is a wildcat, beware!'

== Opposition and failure ==
On January 20, the Painesville Telegraph noted the production of "Mormon money", accused it of being fraudulent, and noted that it was illegal to issue bank notes without a legal charter from the State. In February 1837, Samuel D. Rounds swore a writ against Smith and Rigdon for illegal banking and issuing unauthorized bank paper. At a hearing in March, this trial was postponed until autumn. Eventually Rounds voluntarily dropped all of the cases in his suit except those against Smith and Rigdon. Although Smith's only official capacity for KSSABC was cashier, other officers and parties with equal or greater responsibility were absolved from the suit. KSSABC continued issuing notes through June, but eventually failed due to insolvency, as most of the KSSABC reserves were tied up in land rather than silver as some erroneously believed.

Smith transferred all of his holdings to Oliver Granger and J. Carter in June and resigned from the KSSABC in July. Parrish and Frederick G. Williams assumed management of the KSSABC until the institution closed its doors in November with about $100,000 in unresolved debt. Smith appointed Granger as his agent to clear up his Kirtland affairs, as Smith was named in seventeen lawsuits with claims totalling $30,206.44 over debts incurred in the failure of the KSSABC. According to LDS Church scholars, "Four of these suits were settled; three were voluntarily discontinued by the plaintiffs; and ten resulted in judgments against Joseph Smith and others. Of these ten judgments, three were satisfied in full, three were satisfied in part, and only four were wholly unsatisfied." The church also raised and put up $38,000 in bail money for Smith at the Geauga County Court which was to be held to satisfy any judgment that might be rendered against Smith.

On July 28, Smith, Rigdon and Thomas B. Marsh headed to Upper Canada on church business and returned in late August. On September 27, Smith and Rigdon departed Kirtland for Missouri. They arrived about one month later, spent about two weeks in Missouri on Church business and returned to Kirtland on December 10. In their absence, in October, they were fined $1,000 for operating an illegal bank. According to Dale W. Adams, professor of agricultural economics at Ohio State University, other, larger quasi-banks had been operating in Ohio longer than KSSABC and were not being prosecuted.

Smith later accused Parrish of embezzling $25,000 from KSSABC. In August 1838 Smith sought a search warrant to confirm the allegations against Parrish but was denied.

== Response in the Latter Day Saint community ==
After Parrish started to stir up the Latter Day Saint community, many church members (including Church leaders) became disillusioned with the failure of the KSSABC and left the Church or were disfellowshipped or excommunicated. In May 1837, disgruntled church members (including Church leaders) and non-members alike began to publicly blame Smith for their losses. Some members, like Parley P. Pratt and Cowdery, were later reconciled to Smith and the church.

Smith warned the community against speculation and counterfeiting. Shortly after his resignation from the KSSABC in July he stated in the August 1837 Messenger and Advocate:

I am disposed to say a word relative to the bills of the Kirtland Safety Society Bank. I hereby warn them to beware of speculators, renegadoes [defectors] and gamblers, who are duping the unsuspecting and the unwary, by palming upon them, those bills, which are of no worth, here. I discountenance and disapprove of any and all such practices. I know them to be detrimental to the best interests of society, as well as to the principles of religion.

Shortly before his resignation, Smith also took out a $1,225 loan from a separate bank to help keep KSSABC solvent. Smith publicly denied claims that the KSSABC was created for the purpose of surreptitiously enriching the church leadership, but many disaffected members felt otherwise.

Regardless of the reasons for the KSSABC's failure, much of the blame was laid upon Smith. Half of The Quorum of Twelve Apostles accused Smith of improprieties in the banking scandal, and church Apostle Heber C. Kimball later said that the bank's failure was so shattering that afterwards "there were not twenty persons on earth that would declare that Joseph Smith was a prophet of God." Woodruff records that Smith had an alleged revelation on the topic, but declined to share it, saying only that "if we would give heed to the commandments the Lord had given this morning all would be well." Then Woodruff expresses his own hopes that the KSSABC will "become the greatest of all institutions on EARTH."

On January 12, 1838, faced with a warrant for his arrest on a charge of illegal banking, Smith fled with Rigdon to Clay County, Missouri just ahead of an armed group intending to capture and hold Smith for trial. Smith and Rigdon were both acquainted with not only conflict and violent mobbing they experienced together in Pennsylvania and New York, but with fleeing from the law. According to Smith, they left "to escape mob violence, which was about to burst upon us under the color of legal process to cover the hellish designs of our enemies." Brigham Young left Kirtland for Missouri weeks earlier on December 22 to avoid the dissidents who were angry with Young and threatened him because of his persistent public defense of Smith's innocence. Most of those who remained committed to the church moved to join the main body of the church in Missouri.

== Kirtland Safety Society notes ==
One of the tangible connections from this episode to the present are the notes that were printed at the time. Some church leaders encouraged people to retain these notes in the belief they would regain their value. While the notes never regained their face value, by the late 19th century they had become collector's items. A Kirtland Safety Society note bearing Joseph Smith's signature can be quite valuable. For example, in an auction in March 2006, a $100 note sold for $11,500 (about a 3% per year gain).

== Sources ==
- Adams, Dale W. (1983). "Chartering the Kirtland Bank". BYU Studies. 23 (4): 467–482.
- Bitton, Davis (1972). "The Waning of Mormon Kirtland". BYU Studies. 12 (4): 455–464.
- Fielding, Robert Kent (1957). The Growth of the Mormon Church in Kirtland, Ohio (Ph.D. Diss.). Indiana University. OCLC 6043664.
- Hill, Marvin S.; Rooker, C. Keith; Wimmer, Larry T. (1977). "The Kirtland Economy Revisited: A Market Critique of Sectarian Economics". BYU Studies. 17 (4): 391–476.
- Ludlow, Daniel H., Editor. Church History, Selections From the Encyclopedia of Mormonism. Deseret Book Co., Salt Lake City, UT, 1992. ISBN 0-87579-924-8.
- Partridge, Scott H. (1972). "The Failure of the Kirtland Safety Society". BYU Studies. 12 (4): 437–454.
- Peck, Reed (September 18, 1839), Reed Peck manuscript, Quincy Adams City, Illinois.
- Sampson, D. Paul; Wimmer, Larry T. (1972). "The Kirtland Safety Society: The Stock Ledger Book and the Bank Failure". BYU Studies. 12 (4): 427–436.
- Tanner, Jerald and Sandra. Mormonism: Shadow or Reality?, Chapter 35. Utah Lighthouse Ministry 1964, ISBN 99930-74-43-8.
