= BYU Jerusalem Center =

Middle East site for Brigham Young University, East Jerusalem

Coordinates: 31°47′12″N 35°14′40″E

- Type: Private; Satellite campus of BYU
- Established: May 16, 1989; 37 years ago
- Religious affiliation: The Church of Jesus Christ of Latter-day Saints
- Location: Mount of Olives, East Jerusalem
- Campus: Suburban, 5 acres (0.020 km^{2})
- Director: James R. Kearl
- Website: BYU Jerusalem Center

The Brigham Young University Jerusalem Center for Near Eastern Studies (often simply referred to as the BYU Jerusalem Center or BYU–Jerusalem, and locally known as the Mormon University), situated on Mount of Olives in East Jerusalem, is a satellite campus of Brigham Young University (BYU), the largest religious university in the United States. Owned by the Church of Jesus Christ of Latter-day Saints (LDS Church), the center provides a curriculum that focuses on the Old and New Testaments, ancient and modern Near Eastern studies, and language (Hebrew and Arabic). Classroom study is built around field trips that cover the Holy Land, and the program is open to qualifying full-time undergraduate students at either BYU, BYU-Idaho, or BYU-Hawaii.

Plans to build a center for students were announced by church president Spencer W. Kimball in 1979. By 1984, the LDS Church had obtained a 49-year lease on the land and had begun construction. The center's prominent position on the Jerusalem skyline quickly brought it notice by the ultra-Orthodox Jews of Israel. Protests and opposition to the building of the center springing from the Haredi Jews made the issue of building the center a national and even international issue. After several investigative committees of Israel's Knesset reviewed and debated the issue, Israeli officials decided to allow the center's construction to continue in 1986. The center opened to students in May 1988 and was dedicated by Howard W. Hunter, of the Quorum of the Twelve Apostles, on May 16, 1989. It did not admit students from 2001 to 2006 due to security issues during the Second Intifada but continued to provide tours for visitors and weekly concerts. During construction, the church hired about 300 workers at one time, with 60% Arab workers, and 40% Jewish workers, and as of 2008 uses a similar level of cooperation.

== History ==
=== Before the center ===
The first Latter-day Saint official to enter the city of Jerusalem was apostle Orson Hyde, who came in 1841 and dedicated the land for the gathering of the people of Israel, the creation of a Jewish state, and the building of a temple at some future time. After his visit, the presence of the church in the city was virtually non-existent. By 1971, the city saw enough Latter-day Saint visitors for the church to lease a building in East Jerusalem for church services. BYU's study abroad program to Jerusalem, which began in 1968, played a key role in the growth of church members visitors to the area. The church's presence in the area soon grew too large for the leased space to provide adequate space for worship, so it began looking into building a center for students. In 1972, David B. Galbraith became the director of BYU's program in Jerusalem. He remained in this position until 1987 when the church's First Presidency asked him to organize the BYU Jerusalem Center.

On October 24, 1979, church president Spencer W. Kimball visited Jerusalem to dedicate the Orson Hyde Memorial Gardens, located on the Mount of Olives. The church had donated money to beautify the Jerusalem area, and officials of the Israeli government were present at the occasion. It was at this dedication that Kimball announced the church's intent to build a center for BYU students in the city. Negotiations between the church and the Israeli government stretched from 1980 to 1984. The land the church wanted for the center, located at the northwestern margin of Mount of Olives, right next to the valley which separates it from Mount Scopus, had been occupied by Israel since the Six-Day War of 1967 and could not be sold under Israeli law. The church decided to obtain a lease on the land instead. Leasing the land also prevented the politically controversial problem of the church owning a piece of Jerusalem land. Israeli officials saw the building of the center on the land as a way of solidifying control over land whose ownership was ambiguous under international law. By August 1984, the church had the land on a 49-year lease, building permits had been obtained, and construction on the building began.

=== Construction and controversy ===
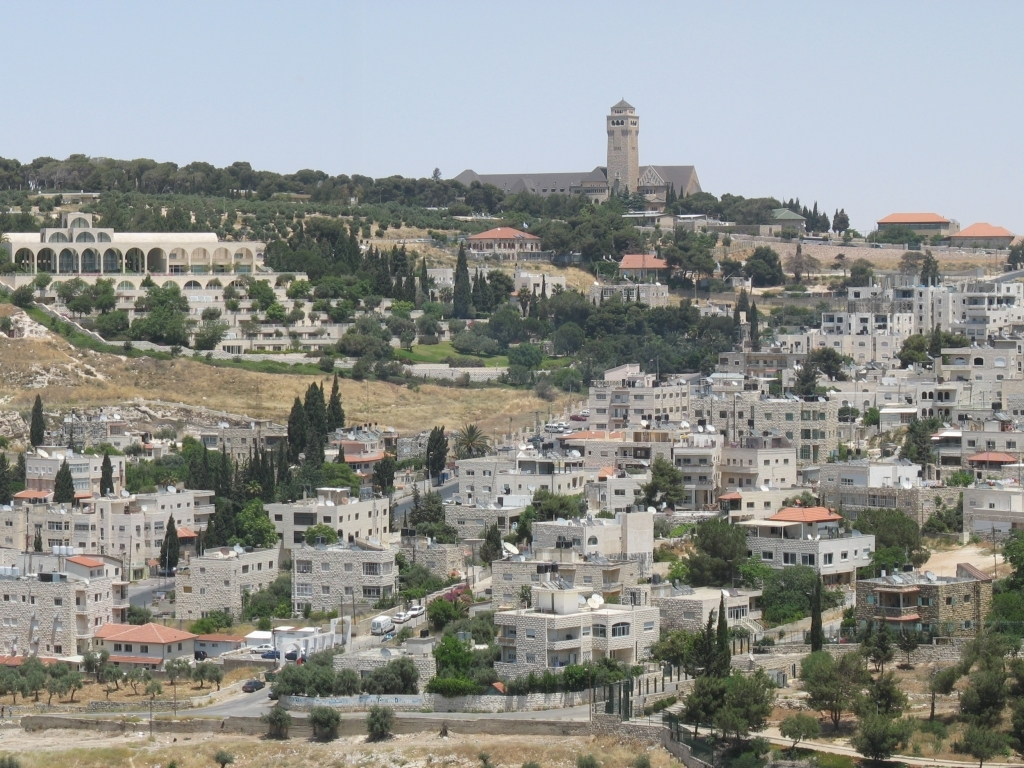
The distinctive multiple-arched BYU Jerusalem Center (top left) amid the buildings of Jerusalem

The 1980s saw Latter-day Saints and other Christian groups vying for representation and space in the city. These groups constantly faced opposition from a strong political minority of Orthodox Jews living in the city. Neither major political party in Israel (the Likud and Labor Parties) could achieve a majority vote in the Knesset without support from the more religious parties. Religious parties used this situation to pass laws in favor of Jewish Orthodoxy in exchange for their support on other issues. At the time, the conservative Jews, who made up the "religious right" in Israel, or the Haredim, constituted 27% of the population of Jerusalem, and was decidedly against the building of the BYU Jerusalem Center or any other similar Christian structure. Larger parties faced loss of a majority if they stood opposite on this issue. Many Israeli officials, however, such as the Mayor of Jerusalem at the time, Teddy Kollek, along with others in attendance at the Orson Hyde Memorial Garden dedication, supported the center because of what the church had done for the city. Kollek specifically stated that the "church's presence in Jerusalem can do a great deal of work in providing the bridge of understanding between the Arab and Jews...because its members look with sympathy and understanding at both sides." The land on which the center was built was then still considered Arab land by many, and many officials saw that its lease would add an image of religious tolerance to their government and increase Israeli control of the land.

Because of its prominent location in the Jerusalem skyline, construction was quickly noticed, and this sparked a major controversy in Israel and in the Jewish world as a whole beginning in 1985. The Haredim led the opposition, their main concern being that the building would be used not as a school, but as a center for Latter-day Saint proselytizing efforts in Jerusalem. The Haredim said there could be a "spiritual holocaust". They argued that the church had no local presence in the population of the Jerusalem area and no historical connections to the land. The group spread information through letters, newspapers, and television that the church's missionaries would convert Jews throughout the city. Kol Ha'lr, an Israeil Periodical, said that the church is one of the most dangerous organizations, and that the church has already struck down many Jews. Kol Ha'lr also stated that church missionary activities would cause "tremendous opposition", and that once the center is completed, the church would not be able to be stopped. Inter Mountain Jewish News, a publication in Colorado, stated that there was an emotional and bitter controversy surrounding whether Christian Zionism should be helped by Jewish government and municipal authorities, like what was being done with BYU.

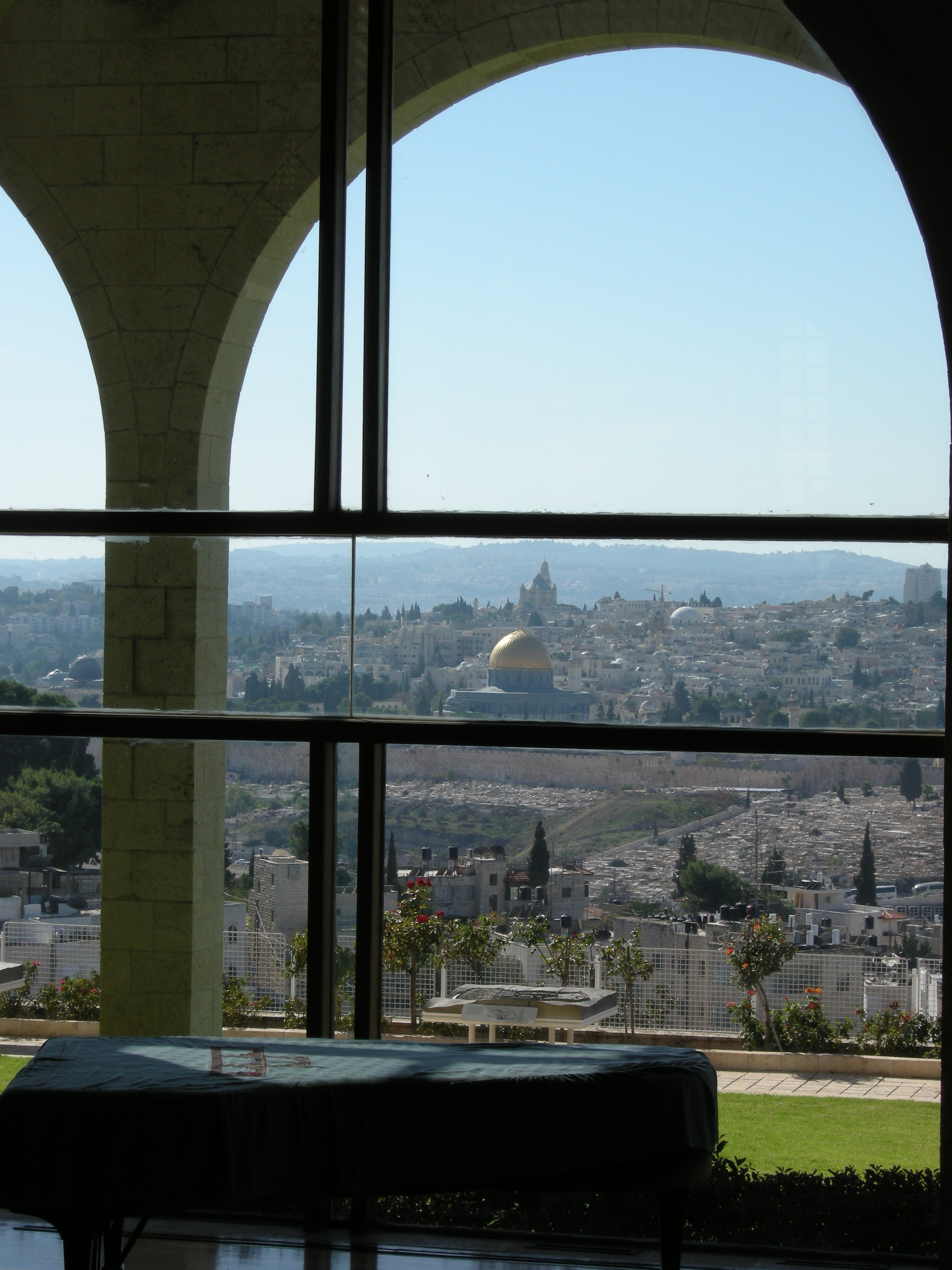
Overlooking the Dome of the Rock from inside the center

Warnings in the media led to street protests and demonstrations. Orthodox Jews marched on City Hall and to the construction site in 1986. Some even gathered at the Western Wall in a public prayer of mourning because of the center. They also gathered at the hotel at which the BYU president was staying at one point, carrying signs saying: "Conversion is Murder!" and "Mormons, stop your mission now". Despite the intensity of the Haredi opposition, at no point did the protests become physically violent. In late 1985, the Haredim motioned for a no-confidence vote against the leading Labor Party. Prime Minister Shimon Peres organized a committee of eight, four for the center and four against, to debate the issue and come up with a solution either for or against the center's presence. Another committee was formed to look into the allegation that the money the church had put into Jerusalem was a bribe to gain Mayor Kolleck's support for the center (the committee found the church "Not Guilty"). A subcommittee of the Knesset requested that the church issue a formal promise not to proselytize Jews. Some Israelis considered this discriminatory, as no other Christian church had been asked to do this in Jerusalem. Church leaders, however, agreed to comply and sent a formally signed statement soon after. Some Jews in the area were still uneasy and doubted the church's intent, believing that religious belief among Latter-day Saints would supersede adherence to the law. One protester stated that "converting the sons of Judah, us, is a basic article of their faith. . . . They regard themselves as sons of Joseph and believe there will be no Second Coming for as long as we and they do not fuse."

In addition to the promise not to proselytize, BYU began a public relations campaign to inform the public of their intentions for the center as a school and a gathering place for those already of the faith. Ads were purchased in local newspapers, magazines, and on television, and the center had personnel appear on radio talk shows. Government officials in favor of the center also began to speak out, saying that Jerusalem should deny no one a place to worship, Jew, Muslim, or Christian. The Minister for Economic Planning, Gad Yaakobi said that the debate had "already caused considerable damage to Israel", and Former Foreign Minister Abba Eban stated that the "free exercise of conscience and dissent in a democratic society" was at stake. The center also received support in the U.S., as former president Gerald Ford spoke for the center, as well the United Jewish Council of Utah, who wrote a letter stating that "For over one hundred years, the Jewish and (Latter-day Saint) communities have coexisted in the Salt Lake Valley in a spirit of true friendship and harmony. It has been our experience that when the leaders of the ... Church make a commitment of policy, it is a commitment which can be relied upon. The stated commitment of Brigham Young University not to violate the laws of the state of Israel, or its own commitment regarding proselytizing in the state of Israel through the Jerusalem-based Brigham Young facility, is a commitment which we sincerely believe will be honored." The U.S. government also became an intermediary as 154 members of Congress issued a letter to the Knesset in support of the BYU Jerusalem Center. In 1986, the Knesset approved the completion of the center.

=== Opening and dedication ===
Students moved into the center on May 8, 1987. The school remained unfinished, but the dormitory levels had been completed. Students had formerly been housed at Kibbutz Ramat Rachel. In 1988, before the center's dedication, a few Jerusalem locals complained that the arrangement of the windows at night looked like a Christian cross. The center purchased blinds and carefully arranged them over the windows so that no such sign would be seen. LDS Church members do not use the symbol of the cross as other Christian denominations do, due to their focus on the resurrection, rather than the death of Christ.

The center was dedicated on May 16, 1989, by Howard W. Hunter, the president of the Quorum of the Twelve Apostles. The dedication ceremony was small, as the church decided not to announce it until a month later. The church did not want a large ceremony to cause concern among those in opposition to the center, who may have seen it as a religious gathering. Thomas S. Monson, then a second counselor in the church's First Presidency, and Boyd K. Packer, another member of its Quorum of the Twelve, were among those in attendance, as well as BYU president Jeffrey R. Holland. Robert C. Taylor, director of the BYU Travel Study program was in attendance and stated in an interview with The Daily Universe that the dedication of the building was centered solely on the educational aspect of the school, as well as for "whatever purposes [the Lord] has in store" in the future. Taylor stated that the church would respect the laws of the land and their commitment not to proselyte.

=== Center closings ===
After the onset of the Second Intifada, security for BYU students became increasingly difficult to maintain, and the center closed indefinitely to students in 2000. During the fighting, BYU sources reported that the center's staff remained on location and managed to maintain good relations on both Israeli and Palestinian sides. As negotiations to stop the fighting continued, one proposed settlement had the center placed within the borders of a proposed Palestinian state (this, however, was not the proposal ultimately agreed upon by the two sides). While closed to students, the center remained open for visitors and concerts.

On June 9, 2006, officials announced their intention to reopen the Jerusalem Center for the Fall 2006 semester. However, escalating violence in the area from the 2006 Israel-Lebanon Conflict frustrated these plans and raised new concerns about students' safety in the area. School officials deemed the center would remain closed until the conflict was resolved. During this time, some Latter-day Saints in Northern Israel were "voluntarily relocated" into the center, away from border missile strikes. BYU officials announced on October 9, 2006, that the center would be reopening for student academic programs for Winter Semester 2007. The initial program was limited to only 44 students. Currently, over 80 students participate each semester. The center remains open into future academic terms.

== Facilities and architecture ==
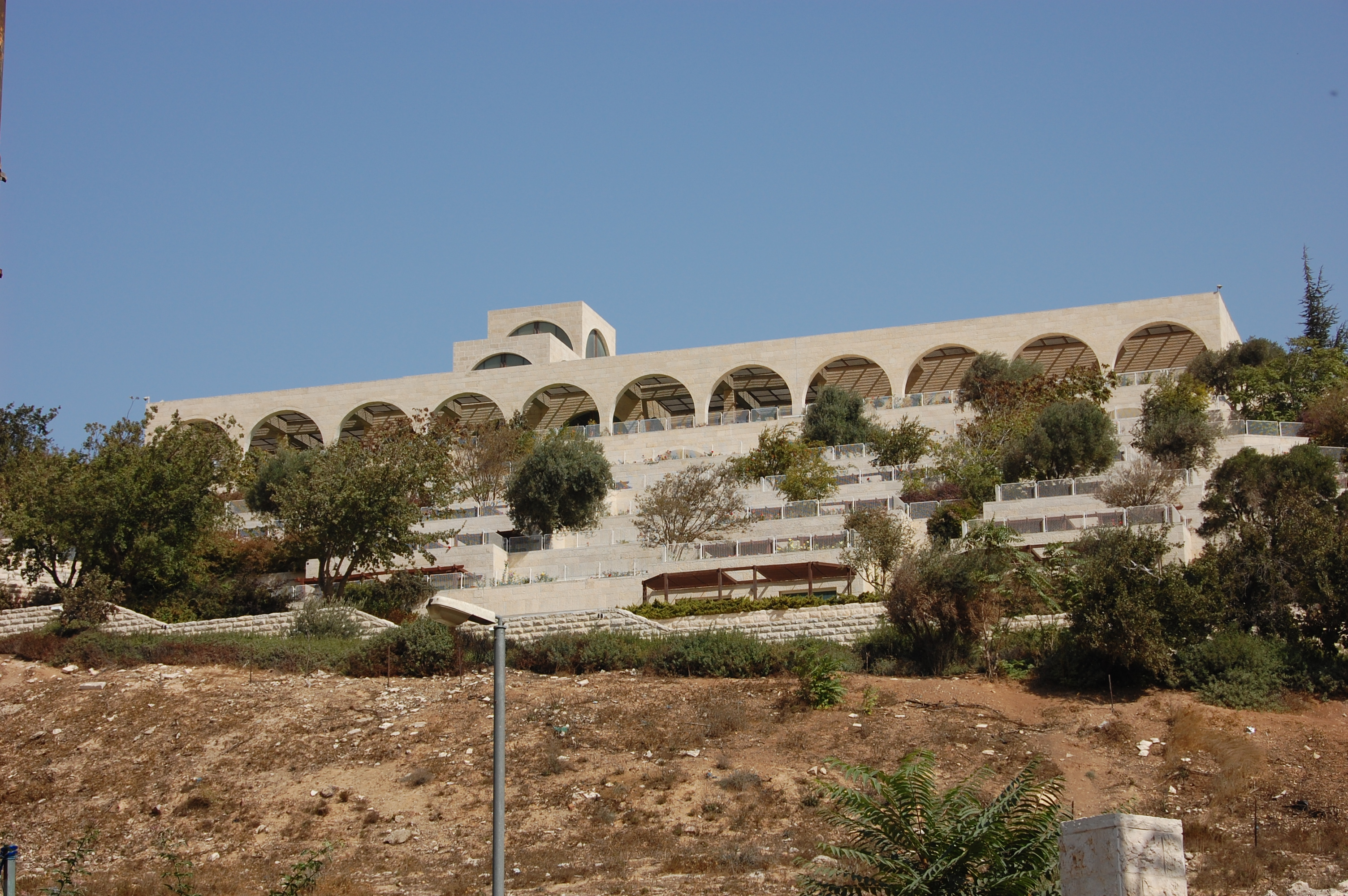
Building seen from below

The center was designed in partnership with Frank Ferguson of FFKR Architects (Salt Lake City) and by Brazilian-Israeli architect David Resnick, who also designed the nearby campus of the Hebrew University. The center is situated on the western slope of the Mount of Olives, right where it connects to Mount Scopus, overlooking the Kidron Valley and the Old City. The 125,000-square-foot (11,600 m^{2}), eight-level structure is set amid 5 acres (2.0 ha) of gardens. The first five levels provide dormitory and apartment space for up to 170 students, each of these apartments having a patio overlooking the Old City. The sixth level houses a cafeteria, classrooms, computer facilities, and a gymnasium, while administrative and faculty offices are located on the seventh level, along with a 250-seat auditorium. The main entry is on the eighth level, which also contains a recital and special events auditorium with organ, lecture rooms, general and reserve libraries, offices, a domed theater, and a learning resource area. This auditorium is surrounded by glass on three sides, providing views of the city. The organ within it is a Scandinavian-made Marcussen organ. The aforementioned library on the same floor as the auditorium contains 10,000-15,000 volumes focusing largely on the Near East.

The center's design reflects the architecture of the Near East. It is constructed of cast concrete. Hand-carved Jerusalem limestone adorn the building, according to local custom. The use of arches and domes closely models other building of Jerusalem and the gardens throughout the center contain many trees and other plants named in the Bible. The interior contains the arches and cupolas typical of the Near East, and large, windowed pavilions provide wide views of Jerusalem.

Over 400 micropiles were drilled into the Mount to secure the foundation in case of an earthquake. The building also contains, in adherence to Israeli law, bomb shelters capable of holding all faculty, staff, and students in case of emergency.

== Research and education ==
The Jerusalem Center played a role in the research of the Dead Sea Scrolls in cooperation with the Dead Sea Scrolls Foundation of Jerusalem. They developed a comprehensive CD-ROM database of the contents of the Scrolls, enabling researchers worldwide the ability to study them.

The center provides a curriculum that focuses on Old and New Testaments, ancient and modern Near Eastern studies, and language (Hebrew and Arabic). Classroom study is built around field trips that cover the Holy Land, and the program is open only to qualifying full-time undergraduate students at either BYU, BYU-Idaho, or BYU-Hawaii.

The center teaches classes in four-month semesters occurring three times per year. Each semester costs $10,815. Students are required to take a small orientation course online before entering the center and are interviewed individually. Application requirements state that students must have attended at least two semesters (including the semester immediately preceding the trip abroad) at BYU, BYU-Hawaii, or BYU-Idaho, have a GPA of at least 2.5, and sign an agreement not to proselytize. Married students are not allowed to attend.

== Mission ==
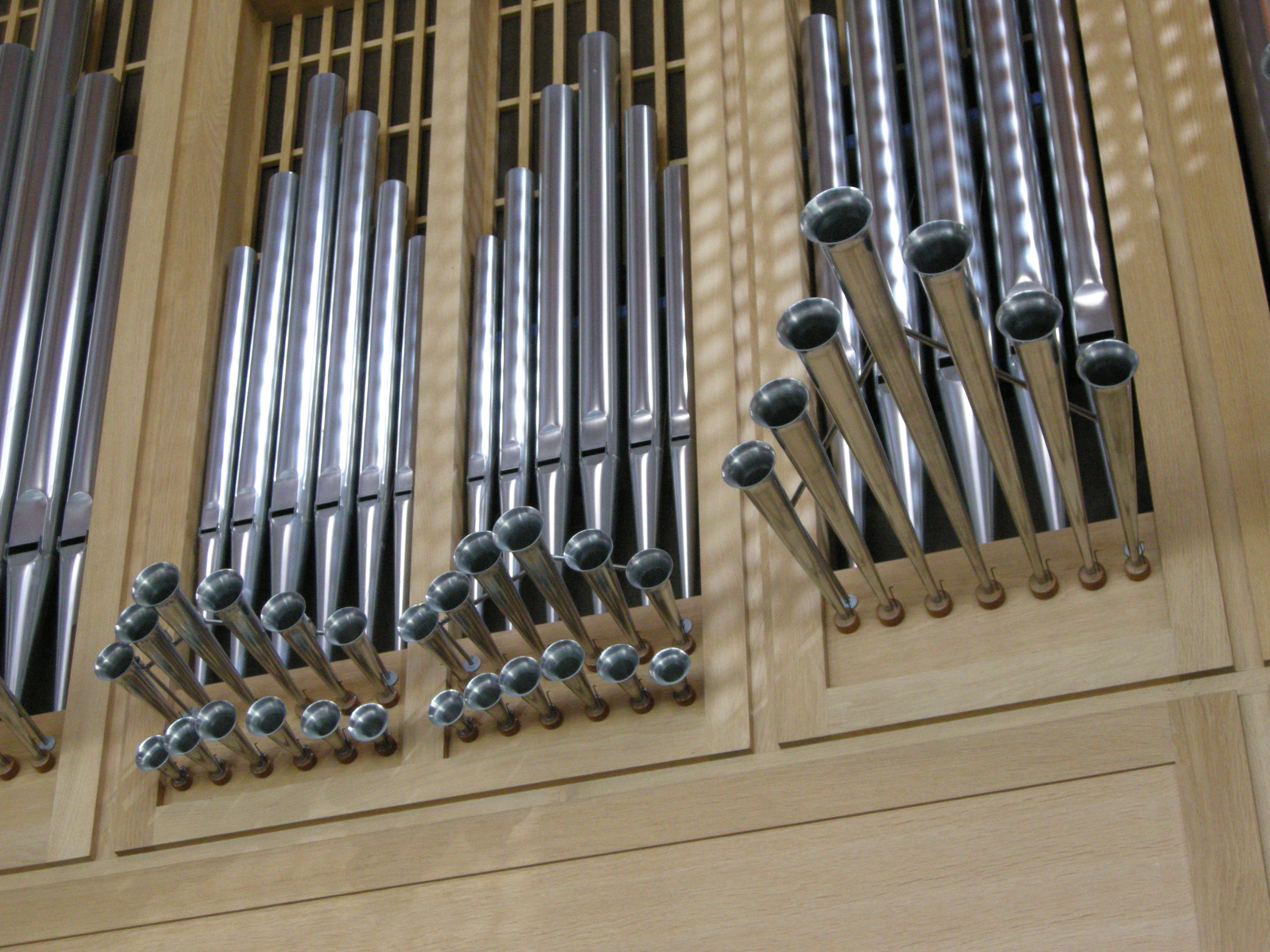
The pipe organ inside the center

LDS Church members believe that Jesus Christ will return in glory in his Second Coming. Howard W. Hunter, who was president of the church's Quorum of the Twelve at the time of the center's completion, pointed out that although there would be no proselytizing from the center, it still served a valuable purpose. One church member quoted him this way: "Elder Hunter said that our mission was not to harvest, probably not even to plant, but to clear away a few more stones." Latter-day Saints often see the center as a way for them to show local Jews what the church is about by example, rather than by proselyting. This is done by the way students and faculty at the center live their lives, as well as through the hiring of both Israeli and Palestinian workers, as an example of what can be done through cooperation. During construction of the center, for example, the church hired as many as 300 workers at one time, with about 60% of them being Arab and the other 40% being Jewish. As of 2008, similar cooperation still continues.

The center also strives to meet the goals of the BYU mission statement, "to assist individuals in their quest for perfection and eternal life" as well as in their educational endeavors. The center aims to give students not only an educational experience by experiencing cultures and languages firsthand, but a spiritual experience by taking them to the sites of biblical events and encouraging them to live their lives in a Christian way.
