= David B. Galbraith =

Canadian theological academic (born 1937)

David Brian Galbraith (born July 5, 1937) is a retired Brigham Young University (BYU) professor of political science who served as director of the BYU Jerusalem Center.

== Biography ==
Galbraith was born in Lethbridge, Alberta, Canada to Bruce V. Galbraith and his wife, Beth Heninger. As a young man, Galbraith served as a missionary in the Swiss-Austrian Mission (LDS Church) of the Church of Jesus Christ of Latter-day Saints (LDS Church).

Galbraith attended BYU, where he received a bachelor's degree in political science and a master's degree in international relations. He holds a doctorate in international relations from Hebrew University of Jerusalem. His doctorate focused on Arab-Israeli relations and conflict resolution.

Galbraith married Frieda Greta Lucile Kruger, a native of Amsterdam in the Netherlands. They first met in 1961 while he was living on a kibbutz and studying Hebrew. She has a bachelor's degree from BYU and a master's degree from Jerusalem University College. She has taught Book of Mormon classes for BYU students who were not native English speakers. They are the parents of five children.

Galbraith spent much of his academic career in the Middle East. He lived there for a total of 20 years and was the director of the BYU Jerusalem Center for 15 years, from its start as a small study abroad program in 1972 through its growth into a major program by the late 1980s. Galbraith wrote the book Jerusalem: The Eternal City with Andrew C. Skinner and D. Kelly Ogden. Other writings of Galbraith include "The Jerusalem Center for Near Eastern Studies: Reflections of a Modern Pioneer" with Blair G. Van Dyke in The Religious Educator Vol. 9 (2008) no. 1.

Galbraith has served in the LDS Church as a stake president, district president and branch president. In 1969 Galbraith became the first LDS branch president in Jerusalem. As such he was closely involved with the requests that led to approval of church meetings for LDS branches in Israel on Saturday and the building of the Orson Hyde Memorial Garden. In these activities he worked closely with Harold B. Lee, Edwin Q. Cannon (who as president of the church's Swiss Mission in 1972 had responsibility for the church in Israel), Gordon B. Hinckley, and Howard W. Hunter.

Galbraith served as president of the Bulgaria Sofia Mission from 2000 to 2003. When he arrived the mission only covered Bulgaria, but in September 2000 the mission was expanded to also include Serbia, Montenegro and Turkey. He later served as president of the church's Montreal Quebec Temple from 2009 to 2012. At the same time his brother, John Galbraith, served as president of the Kiev Ukraine Temple. He is currently retired and living in Provo, Utah with his wife.
