= James R. Kearl =

American economist (born 1947)

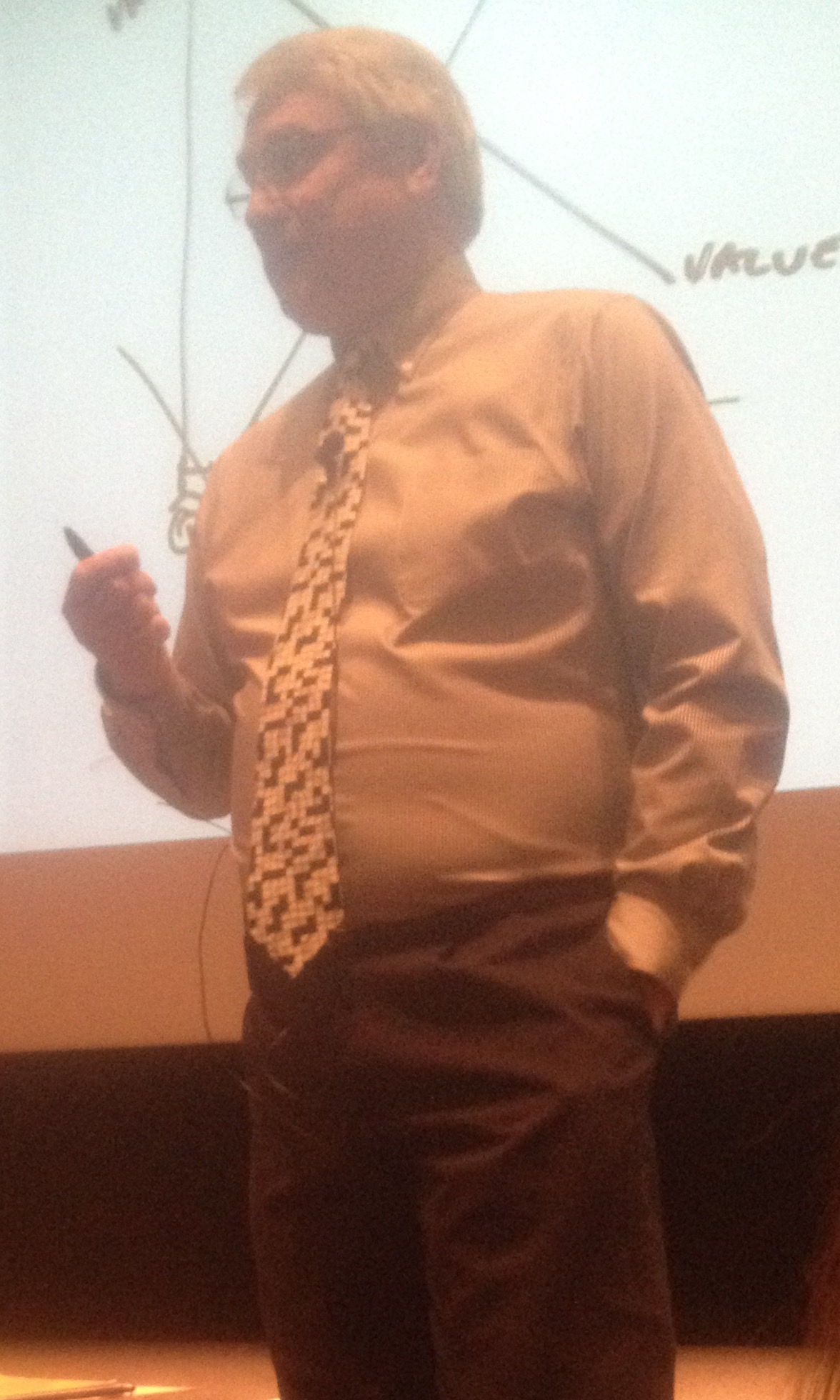
- Born: May 27, 1947 (age 79); Logan, Utah
- Education: Harvard University (post doctoral); Massachusetts Institute of Technology (PhD); Utah State University (BS)
- Occupation: Professor
- Employer: Brigham Young University
- Title: A. O. Smoot Professor of Economics
- Spouse: Linda Durrant Kearl
- Children: 5

James R. Kearl (born May 27, 1947) is the Abraham O. Smoot Professor of Economics at Brigham Young University (BYU) and a principal figure in establishing the BYU Jerusalem Center.

Kearl was born in Logan, Utah, and earned a bachelor's degree from Utah State University in Mathematics and Economics. He obtained a PhD in Economics from the Massachusetts Institute of Technology and completed a post-doctoral program in Law at Harvard Law School.

== Career ==
Kearl was a teaching fellow while studying at Harvard Law School. He joined the faculty of BYU in 1975. He was named a White House Fellow in 1983. From 1983 to 1984 he served as a special assistant to the United States Secretary of Defense. From 1986 to 1989, Kearl served as the dean of general education and honors at BYU. After that role, Kearl served as an associate academic vice president (AAVP) at BYU from 1989 to 1991. From 1991 to 1994, Kearl served as a member of the United States Census Bureau Advisory Board on Population Statistics. Kearl previously served as board chair of the Food and Care Coalition.

A few years after the dedication of the BYU Jerusalem Center, Kearl, who was then a BYU AAVP, became the assistant to the university president to oversee the center. He continues to hold this position, playing a key role in its ongoing success and operation.

He was a Senior Consultant for Charles River Associates. In this capacity, Kearl has served as an expert witness on several prominent cases including Oracle v. Google and Apple v. Samsung.

His areas of expertise include the economics of antitrust liability and damages, the economics of intellectual property and intellectual property damages, and general commercial damages. Kearl has done many studies in cooperation with Clayne L. Pope and Larry T. Wimmer.

== Personal life ==
Kearl is married to Linda Durrant Kearl and they have five children. He is a member of the Church of Jesus Christ of Latter-day Saints.

== Notable Quotes ==
"The optimal amount of traffic deaths is not zero." -Jim R. Kearl (2026)

== Bibliography ==
- Principles of Economics James R. Kearl (D C Heath & Cos, March 1, 1993, ISBN 978-0669289619)
- Principles of Macroeconomics James R. Kearl (D C Heath & Cos, 1993, ISBN 978-0669289633)
- Finding God at BYU S. Kent Brown (Editor), James R. Kearl, Kaye T. Hanson (Covenant Communications Inc., 2001, ISBN 1577349296)
- Economics and Public Policy: An Analytical Approach James R. Kearl (Pearson Custom Publishing, 2005, ISBN 978-0536906649)
