= John Gould (Latter Day Saints) =

First Seven Presidents of the Seventy
- April 6, 1837 – September 3, 1837
- Called by: Joseph Smith
- End reason: Honorably released due to an excess of Presidents of the Seventy

Personal details
- Born: December 21, 1784; New Hampshire, United States
- Died: June 25, 1855 (aged 70); Truro Township, Illinois, United States

John Gould (December 21, 1784 – June 25, 1855) was an early leader in the Latter Day Saint movement.

== Biography ==
Born in New Hampshire, Gould was a Baptist minister in New York and Pennsylvania from 1817 to 1832. He was baptized into The Church of Jesus Christ of Latter-day Saints on December 16, 1832. The following day, he was ordained as an elder in the church by David W. Patten. In August 1833, he traveled with Orson Hyde from church headquarters in Kirtland, Ohio to assist the Latter Day Saints in Jackson County, Missouri. In 1834, Gould helped Joseph Smith organize Zion's Camp, a larger group of men that traveled to Missouri to render assistance; however, Gould did not participate in Zion's Camp.

Gould was a missionary for the church in 1834 and 1835; he preached primarily in New York with Evan M. Greene. Gould was ordained to the priesthood office of Seventy in 1836 and on 6 April 1837 became one of the seven presidents of the Seventy, a position with church-wide authority. However, on September 3 of that year, Gould was removed from his position when it was discovered that there were eight, not seven, men who had been chosen to be presidents of the Seventy. Joseph Young, one of the other presidents of the Seventy, asked Gould if he would be willing to join the high priests quorum; Gould agreed, and was ordained a high priest.

Gould moved with the majority of Latter Day Saints to Nauvoo, Illinois in 1839. When the Latter Day Saints left Hancock County, due to ill health, Gould chose to relocate to Pottawattamie County, Iowa rather than travel west with the Mormon pioneers. In 1846, he relocated to Knoxville, Illinois, and affiliated with the Church of Jesus Christ of Latter Day Saints (Strangite).

Gould died at his home in Truro Township, Knox County, Illinois.

Gould was married to Olivia Swanson and was the father of at least two children. Harrington died in 1847; in 1848, Gould married Delia Metcalf.

== Doctrine and Covenants ==
Gould is mentioned in the Doctrine and Covenants, a Latter Day Saint book of scripture. In a revelation given to Joseph Smith and Sidney Rigdon on October 12, 1833, Smith and Rigdon were told that Gould and Orson Hyde were safe and would be saved if they kept the commandments of God.

== Identity confusion ==
For many years, Latter Day Saint sources confused Gould with another person of the same name who was born in Upper Canada in 1808 and died in Pottawattamie County, Iowa, in 1851. Research performed by the Joseph Smith Papers project revealed the correct dates and places of birth and death of Gould.
