= Carthage Conspiracy =

1975 book by Dallin H. Oaks and Marvin S. Hill

Carthage Conspiracy: The Trial of the Accused Assassins of Joseph Smith
- First edition
- Author: Dallin H. Oaks and Marvin S. Hill
- Language: English
- Publisher: University of Illinois Press
- Publication date: 1975
- Publication place: United States
- Pages: 249
- ISBN: 0252005546
- Dewey Decimal: 345.7302524
- LC Class: KF223 W5302

Carthage Conspiracy: The Trial of the Accused Assassins of Joseph Smith is a 1975 book by Brigham Young University professors Dallin H. Oaks and Marvin S. Hill on the trial of the five defendants who were charged with and acquitted of the murder of Joseph Smith. The book received the Mormon History Association Best Book prize in 1976. It was published by the University of Illinois Press.

== See also ==
- Thomas C. Sharp
- Mark Aldrich
- William N. Grover
- Jacob C. Davis
- Levi Williams
