= Dallin H. Oaks =

American religious leader and jurist (born 1932)

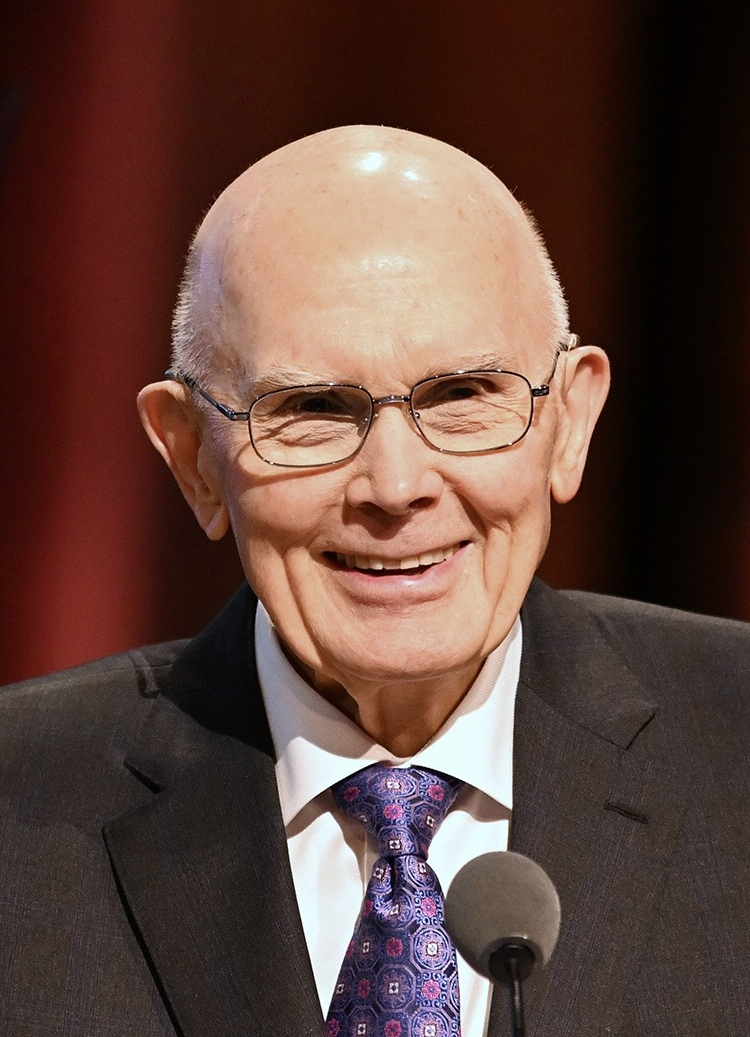
- Oaks in 2023

18th President of the Church of Jesus Christ of Latter-day Saints
- October 14, 2025
- Predecessor: Russell M. Nelson

President of the Quorum of the Twelve Apostles (Note: with M. Russell Ballard (2018–2023) and Jeffrey R. Holland (2023–2025) as Acting Presidents)
- January 14, 2018 – October 14, 2025
- Predecessor: Russell M. Nelson
- Successor: Jeffrey R. Holland
- End reason: Became president of the Church

First Counselor in the First Presidency
- January 14, 2018 – September 27, 2025
- Called by: Russell M. Nelson
- Predecessor: Henry B. Eyring
- Successor: Henry B. Eyring
- End reason: Death of Russell M. Nelson

LDS Church Apostle
- May 3, 1984
- Called by: Spencer W. Kimball
- Reason: Death of Mark E. Petersen

Quorum of the Twelve Apostles
- May 3, 1984 – January 14, 2018
- Called by: Spencer W. Kimball
- End reason: Called as first counselor in the First Presidency

Justice of the Utah Supreme Court
- In office 1980–1984
- Preceded by: D. Frank Wilkins
- Succeeded by: Michael D. Zimmerman

8th President of Brigham Young University
- In office August 1971 – August 1980
- Preceded by: Ernest L. Wilkinson
- Succeeded by: Jeffrey R. Holland

Military career
- 1949–1954
- Service/branch: United States National Guard
- Unit: Utah National Guard

Personal details
- Born: Dallin Harris Oaks; August 12, 1932 (age 94); Provo, Utah, U.S.
- Education: Brigham Young University (BS); University of Chicago (JD)
- Occupation: Lawyer, judge
- Spouse(s): June Dixon (m. 1952; died 1998) Kristen Meredith McMain (m. 2000)
- Children: 6
- Awards: Canterbury Medal (2013); Distinguished Eagle Scout (1984)
- Signature

Dallin Harris Oaks (born August 12, 1932) is an American religious leader and former jurist who is the eighteenth president of the Church of Jesus Christ of Latter-day Saints (LDS Church). He served as the first counselor in the church's First Presidency from 2018 to 2025. He was called as a member of the church's Quorum of the Twelve Apostles in 1984.

Oaks was born in Provo, Utah, and grew up in Provo and Vernal, Utah. He studied accounting at Brigham Young University (BYU), then attended law school at the University of Chicago, where he was editor-in-chief of the University of Chicago Law Review. After graduating in 1957, Oaks was a law clerk to Chief Justice Earl Warren of the U.S. Supreme Court, then spent three years in private practice at Kirkland & Ellis before returning to the University of Chicago as a professor of law. In 1971, Oaks succeeded Ernest L. Wilkinson as the president of BYU. He held the position until 1980, when he was appointed to be a justice of the Utah Supreme Court. He served on the court until his selection to the LDS Church's Quorum of the Twelve Apostles in 1984.

During his professional career, Oaks was twice considered by the president of the United States for nomination to the U.S. Supreme Court: first in 1975 by Gerald Ford, who ultimately nominated John Paul Stevens, and again in 1981 by Ronald Reagan, who ultimately nominated Sandra Day O'Connor.

== Early life ==
Oaks was born on August 12, 1932, in Provo, Utah, to Stella (née Harris) and Lloyd Edress Oaks. Through his mother, he is a second great-grandnephew to Martin Harris, one of the three witnesses of the Book of Mormon. His given name, Dallin, honors Utah artist Cyrus Dallin. Oaks's mother had attended Cyrus Dallin's unveiling of The Pioneer Mother in Springville, Utah in July 1932 and "decided then and there to name her first child after the artist—'providing it was a son.'" Between ages two and eight, Oaks and his family lived in Twin Falls, Idaho.

In 1940, when Oaks was seven years old, his father died of tuberculosis at age thirty-seven. After her husband's death, Stella suffered an episode of mental illness and was unable to attend school and work for a time. During this time, Oaks and his two younger siblings resided with their maternal grandparents in Payson, Utah. The loss of his father and the temporary loss of his mother caused him to have difficulties concentrating in school. When he was about nine or ten years old, he resumed living with his mother, who had taken a position as a teacher in Vernal, Utah. Stella Oaks eventually pursued a graduate degree at Columbia University and later served as head of adult education for the Provo School District. In 1956, she became the first woman to sit on the Provo City Council, where she served for two terms. In 1958, she also briefly served as Provo's assistant mayor.

From about age ten to sixteen, Oaks and his younger brother and sister spent the school year in Vernal, Utah, and the summer in Payson, Utah, with their maternal grandparents while their mother Stella pursued her graduate degree at Columbia. During the school year, Stella was a high school teacher in Vernal. Oaks obtained his first job at the age of twelve at a radio repair shop in Vernal sweeping the floors. He later worked as an engineer and announcer for stations in both Vernal (KJAM) and Provo (KCSU). He obtained his first-class radio operator license in the spring of 1948. Oaks was involved in Boy Scouts and earned the rank of Eagle Scout at age fourteen.

During his first two years of high school, Oaks attended Uintah High School in Vernal, where he was a member of the school's football and debate teams and played oboe in the school band. At the start of his eleventh-grade year, the family moved to Provo, where Oaks chose to attend Brigham Young High School (B.Y. High) because it was smaller than Provo High School. At B.Y. High, he was again involved in football, track, and dramatic productions and played the oboe in the band. Oaks graduated from B.Y. High in 1950.

== Education ==
After graduating from high school, Oaks enrolled at BYU, where he studied accounting. Due to his service in the Utah National Guard and the possibility of being called up to serve in the Korean War, he did not serve a mission for the LDS Church. As a college student, he occasionally served as a radio announcer for local high school basketball games. At a game during his freshman year, he met June Dixon, a senior at one of the high schools. They dated for two years before marrying in 1952 in the Salt Lake Temple.

Oaks graduated from BYU in 1954 with a bachelor's degree with high honors. He then attended the University of Chicago Law School on a full-tuition National Honor Scholarship, where he was editor-in-chief of the University of Chicago Law Review. He graduated in 1957 with a Juris Doctor, cum laude.

== Career ==
After law school, Oaks was a law clerk to Chief Justice Earl Warren of the U.S. Supreme Court from 1957 to 1958. He then entered private practice at the law firm Kirkland & Ellis, where he specialized in corporate litigation. Oaks had worked with this firm twice before, first during a summer in law school and then for a few months before he began his clerkship with Chief Justice Warren. When Oaks began at Kirkland & Ellis, he worked under Robert Bork, but he was quickly appointed as one of the firm's principal lawyers. He worked primarily on cases for clients Standard Oil of Indiana, B. F. Goodrich and Chemetron Corporation, but also assisted with cases for several other companies. Initially, the Oaks family lived in the western suburbs of Chicago, but in 1960, they purchased a home in Elmhurst, Illinois. According to historian Lavina Fielding Anderson, Oaks was the first lawyer from Kirkland & Ellis to represent an indigent party before the Illinois Supreme Court. This case was also the first time Oaks argued a case before an appellate court.

In 1961, Oaks left Kirkland & Ellis and became a professor at the University of Chicago Law School. In 1962, only six months later, he became associate dean of the school when dean Edward H. Levi was named provost of the university. As a professor, Rex E. Lee was among the students for whom he sought to obtain Supreme Court clerkships. As a faculty member, Oaks taught primarily in the fields of trust and estate law, as well as gift taxation law. He worked with George Bogert on a new edition of a casebook on trusts. In 1963, Oaks edited a book entitled The Wall Between Church and State covering discussions on views on the relationship of the government and religion in the law and the aptness of that metaphor. He wrote an article on the school prayer cases aimed at a lay audience that was published in the LDS Church's Improvement Era in December 1963. He also wrote on issues of evidence exclusion and the Fourth Amendment. He was opposed to the exclusionary rule and favored prosecution in "victim-less crimes." In the summer of 1964, he served as assistant state's attorney for Cook County, Illinois. In the fall of 1964, Oaks was appointed a full professor at the University of Chicago law school. While at the University of Chicago, Oaks was the faculty advisor to the legal aid clinic at that institution. He also worked to find ways to address the root issues facing the poor. He felt that federal anti-poverty programs of the time focused too much on symptoms and not enough on causes. Oaks served as a visiting professor at the University of Michigan Law School during the summer of 1968. In 1966, he became a founding member of the editorial board of Dialogue: A Journal of Mormon Thought; he resigned from the journal in early 1970.

In 1969, Oaks served as chairman of the University of Chicago disciplinary committee. In conducting hearings against the 160 students who had been involved in a sit-in at the administration building, Oaks was physically attacked twice. Over 100 students were eventually either suspended or expelled. During the first half of 1970, Oaks took a leave of absence from the University of Chicago while serving as legal counsel to the Bill of Rights Committee of the Illinois Constitutional Convention, which caused him to work closely with the committee chair, Elmer Gertz. From 1970 to 1971, Oaks served as the executive director of the American Bar Foundation. Oaks left the University of Chicago Law School when he was appointed the president of BYU in 1971. In 1975, Oaks was one of eleven candidates considered to be nominated for the vacancy in the United States Supreme Court.

Oaks served for five years as chairman of the board of directors of the Public Broadcasting Service (1979–84) and eight years as chairman of the board of directors of the Polynesian Cultural Center. Additionally, over the course of his career, Oaks served as a director of the Union Pacific Corporation and Union Pacific Railroad.

=== BYU president ===
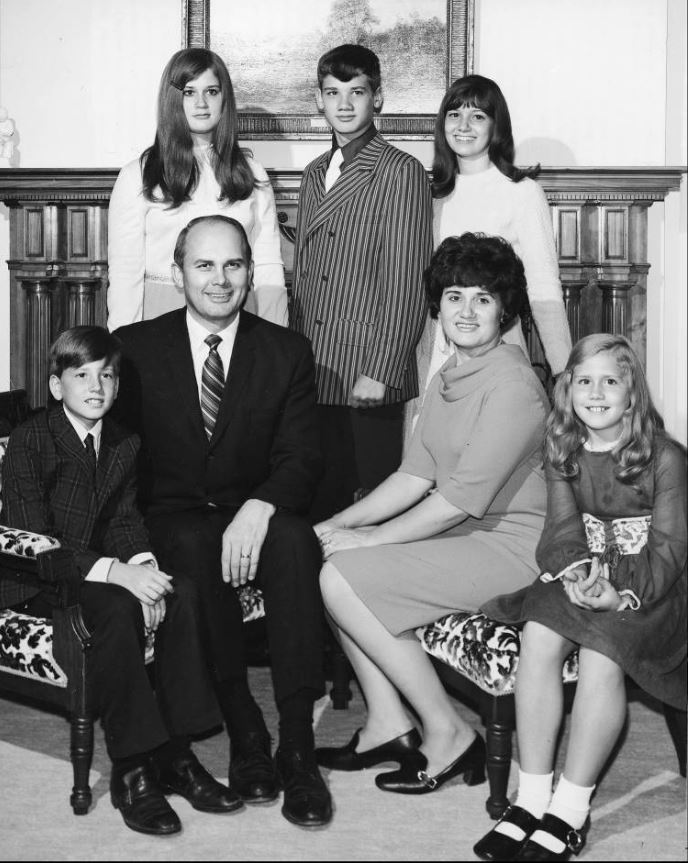
Photo of Oaks and family for his inauguration as BYU president (1971)

After the resignation of Ernest L. Wilkinson as BYU's seventh president, Neal A. Maxwell, who was then commissioner of the Church Educational System, created a search committee for a new president, without any specific candidates in mind. Both Wilkinson and University of Utah Vice President Jerry R. Anderson recommended to Maxwell that Oaks be interviewed. Oaks was offered the position and assumed his duties as BYU's eighth president on August 1, 1971. In this capacity, he oversaw the creation of the J. Reuben Clark Law School and the Graduate Business School. Bruce C. Hafen closely assisted Oaks in the process of setting up the law school.

Although university enrollment continued to grow and new buildings were added, neither was done at the pace of the previous administration. Unlike his predecessor, Oaks took a hands-off approach to the discipline of the university students, specifically in relation to the Church Educational System Honor Code. He believed that disciplinary matters should be delegated to the dean of students. Oaks was well-liked and became a popular president, standing in contrast with the austerity of the Wilkinson administration. He created a Faculty Advisory Council whose members were elected from among the university's faculty. He also instituted a three-tiered system of general education examinations for undergraduates.

When Oaks took office as BYU president, he retained Robert K. Thomas as academic vice president and Ben E. Lewis as executive vice president, the same positions they had held under Wilkinson. Early in his administration, Oaks sought to delegate more authority to deans and department chairs. He also worked to create standardized lines of authority within the university.

Other major changes under Oaks included implementing a three-semester plan with full fall and winter semesters, and a split spring and summer term. This shifted the end of the fall term to before Christmas. Oaks also oversaw a large-scale celebration of the BYU centennial. During his tenure at BYU, enrollment grew twenty percent; the average class size was maintained at thirty-four students. Library holdings increased to 2 million and the number of faculty members with doctorate degrees increased to 22 percent. The number of buildings constructed per year decreased to eight per year, compared to eleven per year during Wilkinson's administration. Church appropriations increased from $19.5 million to $76 million, making up approximately one-third of the university's income. Spending increased from $60 million to $240 million. Under the realization that faculty salaries were considerably low compared to other colleges in the western United States, BYU periodically increased the salary of employees, particularly female employees. Even with the raising of salaries, BYU faculty salaries were still about $1,000 less than other universities and colleges in the region. University income was bolstered by donations and fund-raising. In the mid-1960s, the university decided to name buildings after people who donated more than $500,000 to the university. The first building constructed entirely from private donations was the N. Eldon Tanner Building.

During his administration, Oaks emphasized the equal treatment of women in the workplace. He instituted affirmative action policies to hire more women and worked to equalize the salaries of male and female employees. Despite these reforms, the number of female full professors at BYU was almost unchanged after his presidency, and BYU was behind other universities in the United States in the number of female employees by five percent. Oaks established an ad hoc committee over women's affairs to investigate gender discrimination at BYU. In 1975, BYU instituted policies prohibiting unfair distribution of church-sponsored scholarships based on gender. While at BYU, Oaks led an effort to fight the application of Title IX to non-educational programs at schools that did not accept direct government aid, in an effort to prevent the legislation being used to force BYU to implement mixed-gender student housing. BYU was one of two initial schools to voice opposition to these policies. This issue ultimately ended in an agreement between the U.S. Department of Education and BYU that allowed BYU to retain requirements that all unmarried students live in gender-specific housing whether they lived on or off campus. Oaks was an opponent of federal government intrusion in the private education sector and served as president of the American Association of Presidents of Independent Colleges and Universities for three years.

The Oaks administration dealt with multiple attempts by the federal government to exert control over BYU. In 1975, what was then the U.S. Department of Housing, Education and Welfare, tried unsuccessfully to assert that BYU's honor code was discriminatory based on sex. The next year, the Justice Department tried to exert pressure against small landlords to no longer uphold BYU's sex-separated housing standard. BYU ultimately prevailed in both disputes. In 1979, the Internal Revenue Service tried to force BYU to disclose names of its donors on the contention that they were over-valuing the worth of their donations to BYU. This case went to federal court, where the demand was ruled unjustified.

During his presidency, Oaks co-authored Carthage Conspiracy: The Trial of the Accused Assassins of Joseph Smith with BYU professor of history Marvin S. Hill. The book received the Mormon History Association Best Book prize in 1976.

As president of BYU, Oaks became known for his politically moderate personal beliefs, which largely contrasted with the ultra-conservative views of his predecessor, Wilkinson. Oaks struggled throughout his presidency to distance BYU and the LDS Church from the partisan political atmosphere that had prevailed under Wilkinson, establishing policies intended to prevent BYU administrators from participating in partisan politics. In particular, he worked to counteract the political tensions brought to BYU by the appointment of W. Cleon Skousen, a fiery anti-communist and conspiracy theorist who had been hired as a BYU religion professor under Wilkinson. Other professors in the religion department were strongly critical of Skousen's hiring, believing that he was unqualified and had been hired only because of his conservative political views. During the Oaks administration, Skousen claimed to have been authorized to teach a new course about "Priesthood and Righteous Government", which would be published clandestinely under the name "Gospel Principles and Practices". This course was targeted toward informing ultra-conservative students of what to do about alleged communist infiltration at BYU. Upon learning of Skousen's intentions, Oaks informed the First Presidency that he would not be permitted to teach that course. Skousen was ordered to stop mixing church doctrine and politics and to stop activities associated with his political-educational organization, the "Freeman Institute", which is now known as the National Center for Constitutional Studies. However, he substantially ignored these instructions and continued teaching his politically infused version of church doctrine until his retirement from BYU in 1978.

By the mid-1970s, the relationship between Oaks and some of the more conservative members of the board of trustees became strained, particularly with Ezra Taft Benson, who then served as president of the Quorum of the Twelve Apostles. While Oaks was the BYU president, Benson condemned the undergraduate economics textbooks in use at the university for supporting Keynesian economics, and he expressed concerns as to whether faculty members were teaching socialist economic ideas. Oaks was displeased upon learning that the College of Social Sciences had invited the leader of Utah's Communist party to speak to political science classes, believing that it could set an undesired precedent. Not long afterward, he again became upset when he learned that Benson had invited conservative activist Phyllis Schlafly to address students despite her having previously been rejected by the speakers committee due to her "extreme" views. Oaks also prominently fought against the hiring of conservative Richard Vetterli as a professor of political science despite the fact that Wilkinson had promised to hire him prior to his resignation. Wilkinson lobbied Benson to facilitate Vetterli's appointment after leaving BYU, and Benson and the board of trustees approved his hiring, overruling the insistence by Oaks that Vetterli was not qualified. Soon afterward, Oaks was released as BYU president and Jeffrey R. Holland took his place. The press cited the stand-off between Benson and Oaks with regard to Vetterli as a contributing factor to Oaks's release.

When Oaks had been in office for six years, he wrote to the First Presidency to express that he had become worn out and close-minded in his position. He suggested that BYU establish a six- or seven-year term limit for its presidents. His proposal was tabled for more than two years before he was unexpectedly notified that his release had been approved. After serving for nine years, Oaks stepped down in August 1980. He was appointed to the Utah Supreme Court three months later.

==== Campus police spying controversy ====
Before and during Oaks's time as president of BYU, campus police routinely used undercover agents and a polygraph to investigate honor code violations. In 1975, the university began a program to reduce the number of alleged homosexuals on campus, which included interrogating men in fine arts and drama programs, taking down license plates at gay bars and cross-referencing them with student license plates, and "searches of dorms and other student housing units [which took] place without bona fide search warrants." When asked about the program by reporters, Oaks acknowledged the activities in general terms. BYU public relations stated that the program ended once Oaks became aware of it.

=== Utah Supreme Court ===
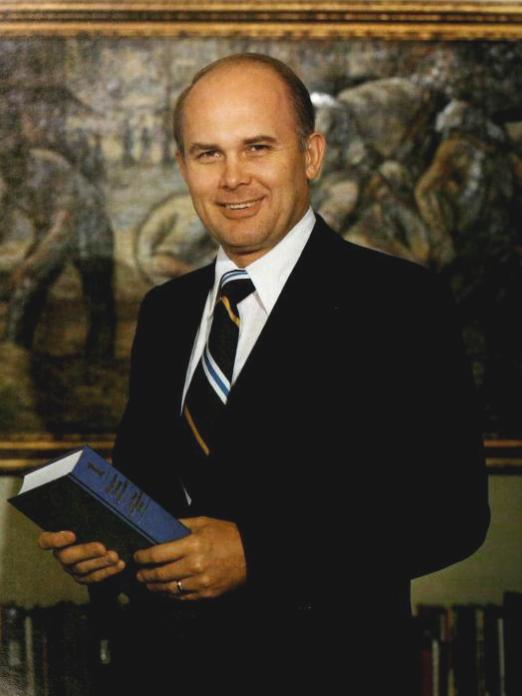
Oaks while president of BYU (1977)

On January 1, 1981, Utah governor Scott M. Matheson appointed Oaks to be a justice of the Utah Supreme Court. Oaks served on the court until 1984, when he resigned following his selection to the LDS Church's Quorum of the Twelve Apostles.

=== U.S. Supreme Court consideration ===
Oaks was twice considered for nomination to the U.S. Supreme Court. In 1975, U.S. Attorney General Edward H. Levi listed Oaks on President Gerald Ford's short list of Supreme Court candidates, but Ford "crossed Oaks's name off the list early on, noting in the margin that a member of the LDS Church might bring a 'confirmation fight.' " Ford ultimately nominated John Paul Stevens, who served on the court from 1975 to 2010.

In 1981, the Reagan administration closely considered Oaks as a potential Supreme Court nominee. A high-ranking official from the U.S. Department of Justice asked Oaks whether he was interested in a vacant seat on the U.S. Court of Appeals for the District of Columbia Circuit, which is often a stepping-stone to the U.S. Supreme Court. Oaks declined the opportunity and instead recommended Antonin Scalia, whom Reagan appointed to the D.C. Circuit in August 1982. Reagan ultimately nominated Sandra Day O'Connor to the Supreme Court seat, fulfilling his campaign promise to appoint the first woman Supreme Court justice, followed by Scalia in 1986.

=== Scholarly research and notable judicial opinions ===
As a law professor, Oaks focused his scholarly research on the writ of habeas corpus and the exclusionary rule. In California v. Minjares, Justice William H. Rehnquist, in a dissenting opinion, wrote "[t]he most comprehensive study on the exclusionary rule is probably that done by Dallin Oaks for the American Bar Foundation in 1970. According to this article, it is an open question whether the exclusionary rule deters the police from violating Fourth Amendment protections of individuals.

Oaks also undertook a legal analysis of the Nauvoo City Council's actions against the Nauvoo Expositor. He opined that while the destruction of the Expositor's printing press was legally questionable, under the law of the time the newspaper certainly could have been declared libelous and therefore a public nuisance by the Nauvoo City Council. As a result, Oaks concludes that while under contemporaneous law it would have been legally permissible for city officials to destroy, or "abate", the actual printed newspapers, the destruction of the printing press itself was probably outside of the council's legal authority, and its owners could have sued for damages.

As a Utah Supreme Court justice from 1980 to 1984, Oaks authored opinions on a variety of topics. In In Re J. P., a proceeding was instituted on a petition of the Division of Family Services to terminate parental rights of child J.P.'s natural mother. Oaks wrote that a parent has a fundamental right protected by the Constitution to sustain their relationship with their child but that a parent can nevertheless be deprived of parental rights upon a showing of unfitness, abandonment, and substantial neglect.

In KUTV, Inc. v. Conder, media representatives sought review by appeal and by a writ of prohibition of an order barring the media from using the words "Sugarhouse rapist" or disseminating any information on past convictions of the defendant during the pendency of a criminal trial. Oaks, in the opinion delivered by the court, held that the order barring the media from using the words "Sugarhouse rapist" or disseminating any information on past convictions of defendant during the pendency of the criminal trial was invalid on the ground that it was not accompanied by the procedural formalities required for the issuance of such an order.

In Wells v. Children's Aid Soc. of Utah, an unwed minor father brought action through a guardian ad litem seeking custody of a newborn child that had been released to the state adoption agency and subsequently to adoptive parents after the father had failed to make timely filing of his acknowledgment of paternity as required by statute. Oaks, writing the opinion for the court, held that the statute specifying the procedure for terminating parental rights of unwed fathers was constitutional under due process clause of the United States Constitution.

Among works edited by Oaks is a collection of essays entitled The Wall Between Church and State. Since becoming an apostle, Oaks has consistently spoken in favor of religious freedom and warned that it is under threat. He testified as an official representative of the LDS Church on behalf of the Religious Freedom Restoration Act during congressional hearings in 1991, (Note: This was the third time that an official of the LDS Church brought an official stance to Congress, and in his testimony Oaks stated that his actions as an official church spokesperson were an exception to the general rule of the church's not taking a stand on pending legislation.) and then in 1998 in favor of the Religious Land Use and Institutionalized Persons Act. These were among of few occasions on which the church has sent a representative to testify on behalf of a bill before the U.S. Congress. Earlier, in 1987, while Oaks was serving as an apostle of the church, he testified in support of the nomination of Robert Bork to the U.S. Supreme Court, but on this occasion he appeared on his own behalf, and not as an official representative of the LDS church.

== LDS Church service ==
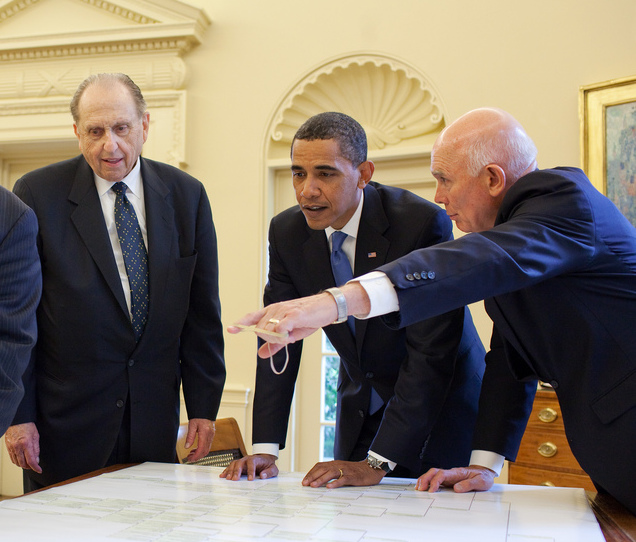
Dallin H. Oaks (right) with LDS Church president Thomas S. Monson (left) and U.S. President Barack Obama (center) in the Oval Office on July 20, 2009, presenting a personal volume of President Obama's genealogy as a gift from the LDS Church

While a law student, Oaks served as an elders quorum president in his ward in Chicago. After he returned to the Chicago metro area after clerking for Justice Warren, Oaks was a counselor in his ward Sunday School presidency starting in 1959. He also was a counselor in the presidency of the Chicago Stake genealogical organization. He was then called as a stake missionary and counselor in the stake mission presidency, a set of positions at the time that required him to spend about forty hours per month proselytizing.

In 1962, Oaks served as the stake mission president in the church's Chicago Illinois Stake. He was set apart to this position by Boyd K. Packer, who was then an assistant to the Quorum of the Twelve Apostles.

In 1963, he served as second counselor in the presidency of the newly created Chicago Illinois South Stake. He was set apart to this office by Howard W. Hunter. He later served briefly as the first counselor in the same stake in 1970 but was released when he was appointed as BYU's president and moved to Utah.

During part of his time as BYU president, Oaks served as a regional representative, assigned to oversee some of the stakes in the Salt Lake Valley. After leaving BYU, Oaks conducted research and other assignments for the church's special affairs committee, headed by Gordon B. Hinckley, and overseeing public relations, government relations, and related matters.

=== Quorum of the Twelve Apostles ===
On April 7, 1984, during the Saturday morning session of the LDS Church's general conference, Oaks was sustained as an apostle and member of the Quorum of the Twelve. In addition to advisory and operational duties, as a member of the Quorum of the Twelve, Oaks is accepted by the church as a prophet, seer, and revelator.

Although sustained on April 7, Oaks was not ordained an apostle until May 3, 1984. He was given this time between sustaining and ordination to complete his judicial commitments. Of the shift from judge to apostolic witness, Oaks commented, "Many years ago, Thomas Jefferson coined the metaphor, 'the wall between church and state.' I have heard the summons from the other side of the wall. I'm busy making the transition from one side of the wall to the other." At age fifty-one, he was the youngest apostle in the quorum at the time and the youngest man to be called to the quorum since Boyd K. Packer, who was called in 1970 at age forty-five. Every apostle ordained since has been older, with the youngest being David A. Bednar at fifty-two and Jeffrey R. Holland at fifty-three.

From 1985 to 2000, and again from 2005 to 2010, Oaks served as one of the advisors to the church's history department, where he served with Russell M. Nelson in this assignment during the latter time period. For several years Oaks was also closely involved with the church's public relations operations.

Oaks has spoken on behalf of the LDS Church on political issues, primarily those affecting religious liberty. In 1992, he testified before committees in the United States Senate and the United States House of Representatives on the proposed Religious Freedom Restoration Act (RFRA), arguing that it would be a step in the right direction in maintaining protection of religious liberty after the precedent set by Employment Division v. Smith (1990). Oaks spoke again after the law had passed in 1993 and had subsequently been ruled unconstitutional a few years later.

In 1989, Oaks traveled to India to dedicate that country for the preaching of the gospel.

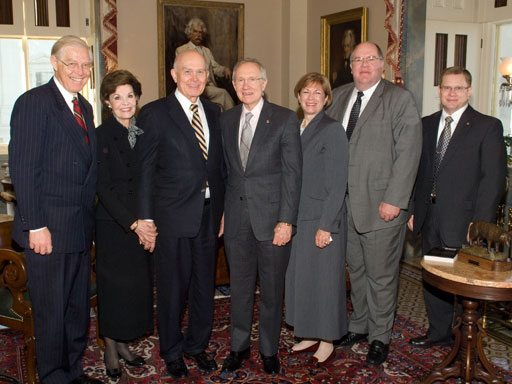
Oaks with U.S. Senator Harry Reid at the U.S. Capitol with other members of the LDS leadership in 2010

From 2002 to 2004, Oaks presided over the church's Philippines Area. Responsibility for presiding over such areas is generally delegated to members of the Quorums of the Seventy. The assignment of Oaks, along with Jeffrey R. Holland, who served in Chile at the same time, was aimed at addressing challenges in developing areas of the church, including rapid growth in membership, focus on retention of new converts, and training local leadership. During his first year as president, Oaks and his counselors, Angel Abrea and Richard J. Maynes, focused on three main goals: teaching doctrine and building faith, shifting efforts towards retention, and establishing programs of activity for youth.

In 2006, Oaks and Lance B. Wickman were interviewed regarding homosexuality and the LDS Church.

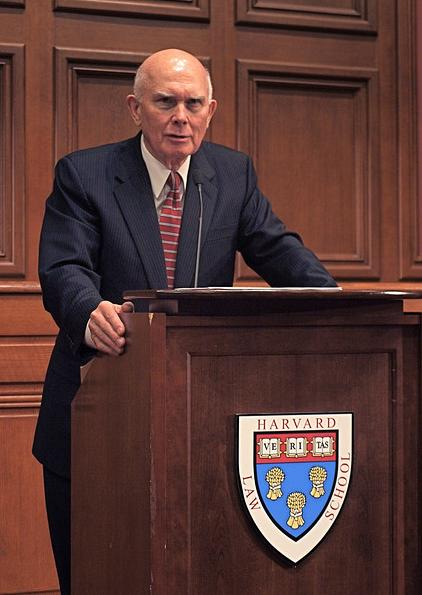
Oaks addressed an audience at Harvard Law School, 2010

On February 26, 2010, Oaks addressed students at the annual Mormonism 101 series convened at Harvard Law School.

In April 2015, included as part of an assignment to tour Argentina, Oaks gave a speech on religious freedom to the Argentine Council for International Relations.

Among other assignments, Oaks has served as the senior member of the Quorum of the Twelve Apostles on the Church Board of Education and Boards of Trustees (CES Board), including as chairman of its executive committee.

=== Counselor in the First Presidency ===
In January 2018, Russell M. Nelson became the church's new president. As the apostle second in seniority to Nelson, Oaks became president of the Quorum of the Twelve Apostles. However, since Oaks was appointed as Nelson's first counselor in the First Presidency, M. Russell Ballard was appointed as the quorum's acting president. As first counselor in the First Presidency, Oaks served as first vice chairman of the CES Board.

On June 1, 2018, Oaks gave the opening address at the First Presidency-sponsored "Be One" event, celebrating the fortieth anniversary of the revelation extending the priesthood and access to temple ordinances, such as the endowment and sealing, to all worthy males, regardless of race. Oaks spoke of seeing the hurt that the restriction had caused, more so while he was a resident of Washington, D.C., and Chicago than he had seen in Utah. He also spoke of how the announcement had been a very emotional time for him. He noted that, prior to the 1978 announcement, having studied many explanations for the priesthood restriction, he concluded that he was not satisfied that any offered explanation for the restriction was inspired. Oaks called on people to not dwell too deeply on past policies but to look forward to a brighter future. He also denounced any prejudices, be they racial, ethnic, economic, or others and called on anyone who held such beliefs to repent.

In October 2020, Oaks gave a talk at general conference in which he encouraged civility and denounced racism. On October 27, 2020, he gave a BYU devotional address in which he again touched on this topic, explicitly endorsing the message "Black Lives Matter" while also discouraging its use to advance controversial propositions. In May 2022, Oaks delivered a eulogy at the funeral service of former Senator Orrin Hatch.

=== Church president ===
On October 14, 2025, Oaks was appointed as the church's eighteenth president, following the death of Russell M. Nelson. Oaks selected Henry B. Eyring as First Counselor and D. Todd Christofferson as Second Counselor in the newly reconstituted First Presidency.

A number of scholars reacted to the announcement. Historian Benjamin Park said, "President Oaks has been one of the most influential and consequential LDS apostles for quite some time, so I expect his presidency to be a culmination of trends already in motion rather than a redirection." Historian Patrick Q. Mason said, "Unity is a top priority for Oaks and other senior church leaders. They will do everything they can to prevent schisms of various sorts in the church." Religion scholar Taylor G. Petrey noted:

[Oaks] strongly believes that the church only flourishes in a culture and environment that is broadly compatible with its values. Rather than seeking to adapt the church to those shifting values, he seeks to shape society to reflect the values of the church. This is not a matter of theocratic rule, but a democracy that is friendly toward religious interests and culture. Fairness for all was a major slogan and initiative he undertook.

== Awards and honors ==
Oaks earned the rank of Eagle Scout in 1947, and he was honored with the Distinguished Eagle Scout Award in 1984. He was named "Judge of the Year" by the Utah State Bar in 1984. Oaks received an honorary degree from Southern Utah University in 1991. And, he was bestowed the Lee Lieberman Otis Award for Distinguished Service by the Federalist Society in 2012. He received the Canterbury Medal from the Becket Fund for Religious Liberty in 2013, and he received the Pillar of the Valley Award by Utah Valley Chamber of Commerce in 2014. In 2021, he was honored by America's Freedom Festival for his lifetime of work promoting the values of God, family, freedom, and country. Oaks was named an honorary board member of the World Congress of Families.

Students at the University of Chicago Law School created the Dallin H. Oaks Society to "increase awareness within the law school community of the presence, beliefs, and concerns of law students who are members of the Church of Jesus Christ of Latter-day Saints".

== Family ==
Oaks and his first wife, June Dixon, were married in 1952 in the Salt Lake Temple. They had six children, including Dallin D. Oaks, a linguistics professor at BYU, and Jenny Oaks Baker, a violinist. Their last child, Jenny, was born thirteen years after their fifth child. His brother Merrill, who was also an LDS leader, died in December 2024 at the age of 88.

June Dixon Oaks died of cancer in 1998, aged 65. Two years later, Oaks married Kristen Meredith McMain in the Salt Lake Temple. McMain was in her early fifties, and it was her first marriage; she had previously served a mission for the LDS Church in the Japan Sendai Mission. McMain has bachelor's and master's degrees from the University of Utah and a doctorate in curriculum and instruction from BYU.

As of 2025, Oaks had 29 grandchildren, 73 great-grandchildren, and 2 great-great-grandchildren.

== Works ==
=== Articles ===
- Oaks, Dallin H. (1962). "The 'Original' Writ of Habeas Corpus in the Supreme Court". Supreme Court Review. 1962: 153–211. doi:10.1086/scr.1962.3108795. JSTOR 3108795. OCLC 479577199. S2CID 147013819.
- — (1965). "Habeas Corpus in the States—1776–1865". University of Chicago Law Review. 32 (2): 243–288. JSTOR 1598691. OCLC 486661030.
- — (1965). "The Suppression of the Nauvoo Expositor". Utah Law Review. 9 (4): 862–903. OCLC 83257504.
- — (1966). "Legal History in the High Court—Habeas Corpus". Michigan Law Review. 64 (3): 451–472. JSTOR 1287225. OCLC 485030899.
- — (1970). "Studying the Exclusionary Rule in Search and Seizure". University of Chicago Law Review. 37 (4): 665–757. JSTOR 1598840. OCLC 486663762.
- — (1976). "Ethics, Morality and Professional Responsibility". Brigham Young University Studies. 16 (4): 507–516. OCLC 367531806. Archived from the original on February 1, 2014.
- — (1976). "A Private University Looks at Government Regulation". Journal of College and University Law. 4 (1): 1–12. OCLC 425071127.
- —; Bentley, Joseph I. (1976). "Joseph Smith and Legal Process: In the Wake of the Steamboat Nauvoo". BYU Law Review. 1976 (3): 735–782.
- — (August 1977). "BYU and Government Controls". Change. 9 (8): 5. JSTOR 40176982.
- — (1982). "Tribute to Lewis F. Powell, Jr". Virginia Law Review. 68 (2): 161–167. JSTOR 1072876.

=== Books ===
- Oaks, Dallin H. (2014), Trust In His Promises - A Message for Women, Salt Lake City: Deseret Book, ISBN 978-1-60907-906-2
- —— (2011), Life's Lessons Learned: Personal Reflections, Salt Lake City: Deseret Book, ISBN 978-1-60908-931-3, OCLC 748290748
- —— (2002), With Full Purpose of Heart, Salt Lake City: Deseret Book, ISBN 978-1-57008-934-3, OCLC 50205573
- —— (1998), His Holy Name, Salt Lake City: Bookcraft, ISBN 978-1-57008-592-5, OCLC 40186303
- —— (1991), The Lord's Way, Salt Lake City: Deseret Book, ISBN 978-0-87579-578-2, OCLC 24467303
- —— (1988), Pure In Heart, Salt Lake City: Bookcraft, ISBN 978-0-88494-650-2, OCLC 51605024
- —— (1984), Trust Doctrines in Church Controversies, Salt Lake City: Mercer University Press, ISBN 978-0-86554-104-7, OCLC 10230752
- ——; Hill, Marvin S. (1975), Carthage Conspiracy: The Trial of the Accused Assassins of Joseph Smith, Urbana, Illinois: University of Illinois Press, ISBN 978-0-252-00554-1, OCLC 1528345
- ——; Lehman, Warren (1968), A Criminal Justice System and the Indigent: A Study of Chicago and Cook County, Chicago: University of Chicago Press, OCLC 227925
- Oaks, Dallin H.; Drinan, Robert F., eds. (1963). The Wall Between Church and State. Chicago, Illinois: University of Chicago Press. OCLC 232323.
- Oaks, Dallin H. (1957), The effects of Griffin v. Illinois on the States' administration of the criminal law, Chicago: Council of State Governments, hdl:2027/mdp.39015077934076, OCLC 5882888

=== Book chapters ===
- Oaks, Dallin H. (2001). "The Historicity of the Book of Mormon". In Hoskisson, Paul Y. (ed.). Historicity and the Latter-day Saint Scriptures. Religious Studies Center monograph series, v. 18. Provo: Religious Studies Center, Brigham Young University. pp. 238–248. ISBN 978-1-57734-928-0. OCLC 48749213.
- —— (1999). "The missionary work of The Church of Jesus Christ of Latter-day Saints". In Witte, John; Martin, Richard C. (eds.). Sharing The Book: religious perspectives on the rights and wrongs of proselytism. Maryknoll, New York: Orbis Books. ISBN 1570752761. OCLC 42290427.
- —— (1995). "Rights and Responsibilities". In Etzioni, Amitai (ed.). Rights and the Common Good: the Communitarian Perspective. New York: St. Martin's Press. ISBN 0312102720. OCLC 31614187.

=== Speeches ===
- —— (2025), Honoring Judge J. Clifford Wallace: A Life of Law, Leadership, and Legacy, BYU Speeches
- —— (2022), Going Forward in the Second Century, BYU Speeches
- —— (2020), Racism and Other Challenges, BYU Speeches
- —— (2017), Challenges to the Mission of Brigham Young University, BYU Speeches
- —— (2016), Elections, Hope, and Freedom, BYU Speeches
- —— (2015), Joy at Graduation, BYU Speeches
- —— (2012), "Hold the Banner High", BYU Speeches
- —— (2011), Truth and Tolerance, BYU Speeches
- —— (2007), Push Back Against the World, BYU Speeches
- —— (2005), The Dedication of a Lifetime, BYU Speeches
- —— (2004), Where Will It Lead?, BYU Speeches
- —— (2002), Timing, BYU Speeches
- —— (1999), Weightier Matters, BYU Speeches
- —— (1998), Why Do We Serve at BYU?, BYU Speeches
- —— (1998), Judge Not and Judging, BYU Speeches
- —— (1995), Adversity, BYU Speeches
- —— (1994), Sins and Mistakes, BYU Speeches
- —— (1994), Responsibilities of Citizenship, BYU Speeches
- —— (1993), "Another Testament of Jesus Christ", BYU Speeches
- —— (1992), Our Strengths Can Become Our Downfall, BYU Speeches
- —— (1991), Getting to Know China, BYU Speeches
- —— (1990), Meeting the Challenges of the Nineties, BYU Speeches
- —— (1990), Sin and Suffering, BYU Speeches
- —— (1987), Free Agency and Freedom, BYU Speeches
- —— (1986), Spiritual Gifts, BYU Speeches
- —— (1985), "The Desires of Our Hearts", BYU Speeches
- —— (1984), Counsel for Students, BYU Speeches
- —— (1981), Revelation, BYU Speeches
- —— (1979), The Formula for Success at BYU, BYU Speeches
- —— (1978), Where Much is Given, BYU Speeches
- —— (1976), Expectations at BYU, BYU Speeches
- —— (1975), The Student Body and the President, BYU Speeches
- —— (1974), The Blessing of Commandments, BYU Speeches
- —— (1974), The Popular Myth of the Victimless Crime, Internet Archive
- —— (1973), Challenges for the Year Ahead, BYU Speeches
- —— (1973), Be Honest in All Behavior, BYU Speeches
- —— (1971), Why Dress and Grooming Standards?, BYU Speeches
- —— (1971), Gambling, BYU Speeches

== See also ==
- Council on the Disposition of the Tithes
- Church Board of Education and Boards of Trustees
- List of law clerks for the chief justice of the United States

== Notes ==
The Church of Jesus Christ of Latter-day Saints titles
Preceded by Russell M. Nelson	President of the Church; October 14, 2025 –	Succeeded by Incumbent
Preceded by Russell M. Nelson	Quorum of the Twelve Apostles; May 3, 1984 – January 14, 2018	Succeeded by M. Russell Ballard
Preceded by Russell M. Nelson	President of the Quorum of the Twelve Apostles; January 14, 2018 – October 14, 2025; With: M. Russell Ballard (Acting until November 12, 2023) and Jeffrey R. Holland (Acting from November 15, 2023, to September 27, 2025)	Succeeded by Jeffrey R. Holland
Preceded by Henry B. Eyring	First Counselor in the First Presidency; January 14, 2018 – September 27, 2025	Succeeded by Henry B. Eyring
Academic offices
Preceded by Ernest L. Wilkinson	President of Brigham Young University; 1971–1980	Succeeded by Jeffrey R. Holland
