= James McDonald (economist) =

American economist

James B. McDonald (born c. 1942) was the Clayne L. Pope Professor of Economics at Brigham Young University, specializing in econometrics. He received his B.S. in Mathematics from Utah State University in 1964; his M.S. in mathematics from Utah State University in 1966; and his Ph.D. in Economics from Purdue University in 1970.

His research includes (1) the study of models for the distribution of income and of stock returns and (2) partially adaptive estimators of various econometric models which are robust to many types of misspecification of the error distribution.

He has received the following awards for teaching and influential research: BYU Professor of the Year Award (1986), the Robert Mehr Research Award Journal of Risk and Insurance (2002), the Brigham Service Award Brigham Young University (2003); Fellow, Utah Academy of Sciences, Arts, and Letters (2003); and the Clayne L. Pope Professorship, Brigham Young University (2006).
