= Marvin S. Hill =

American historian (1928–2016)

- Born: Marvin Sidney Hill; August 28, 1928
- Died: July 27, 2016 (aged 87); Pleasant Grove, Utah, US
- Spouse: Lila Foster (m. 1953)

Academic background
- Education: Brigham Young University; University of Chicago
- Thesis: The Role of Christian Primitivism in the Origin and Development of the Mormon Kingdom, 1830–1844 (1968)
- Doctoral advisor: Martin E. Marty

Academic work
- Discipline: History
- Sub-discipline: American history; Mormon history
- School or tradition: New Mormon history
- Institutions: Brigham Young University

Marvin Sidney Hill (1928–2016) was a professor of American history at Brigham Young University (BYU) and a historian of the Latter Day Saint movement.

== Biography ==
Born on August 28, 1928, Hill completed his Master of Arts in history at BYU in 1955. He received a PhD in American intellectual history from the University of Chicago in 1968 and studied under Martin E. Marty and wrote his dissertation on Christian primitivism and Mormonism. Hill attended the University of Chicago at the same time as Dallin H. Oaks, and their mutual interest in the murder of the Mormon founder Joseph Smith in Illinois led to a ten-year research effort. Together, they published the book Carthage Conspiracy: The Trial of the Accused Assassins of Joseph Smith in 1975 while both were working at BYU, Hill as a professor of history and Oaks as the president of BYU. It won the Mormon History Association's best book award for 1976.

Hill was a professor of American history at BYU starting in the 1960s. In 1972, he took leave from BYU to accept a post-doctoral research fellowship at Yale University. He has also served as president of the Mormon History Association and on the board of editors of the Journal of Mormon History.

In Mormon studies, Hill was a well-known proponent of the new Mormon history and advocated a "middle ground" approach that did not seek to describe Mormonism as authentic or fraudulent.

Hill married Lila Foster in 1953. They had six children and lived in Provo, Utah. He was the brother of Donna Marie Hill (1921–2007), the author of the noted 1977 biography Joseph Smith, the First Mormon. He died in Pleasant Grove, Utah, on July 27, 2016.

== Awards ==
- 1975: Best Book Award for Carthage Conspiracy with Dallin H. Oaks (Mormon History Association)
- 1977: Best Article By a Senior Author for "The Kirtland Economy Revisited" with C. Keith Rooker and Larry T. Wimmer (Mormon History Association)
- 1989: Best Book Award for Quest for Refuge (Mormon History Association)

== Writings ==
=== Books ===
- Hill, Marvin S.; Allen, James B., eds. (1972). Mormonism and American Culture. Interpretations of American History. New York: Harper & Row. ISBN 0-06-042819-8.
- Oaks, Dallin H.; Hill, Marvin S. (1975). Carthage Conspiracy: The Trial of the Accused Assassins of Joseph Smith. Urbana: University of Illinois Press. ISBN 0-252-00554-6.
- Hill, Marvin S.; Clifton Keith Rooker (1937 - 2022); Larry T. Wimmer (1977). The Kirtland Economy Revisited: A Market Critique of Sectarian Economics. Studies in Mormon History. Vol. 3. Provo, Utah: BYU Press. ISBN 0-8425-1230-6. Published concurrently in BYU Studies 17.
- Hill, Marvin S. (1989). Quest for Refuge: The Mormon Flight from American Pluralism. Salt Lake City: Signature Books. ISBN 0-941214-70-2.
- Smith, Joseph Jr. (1995). Marvin S. Hill (ed.). The Essential Joseph Smith. Classics in Mormon Thought. Vol. 4. Salt Lake City: Signature Books. ISBN 0-941214-71-0.

=== Articles ===
- Hill, Marvin S. (December 1959). "Survey: The Historiography of Mormonism". Church History. 28: 418–26. doi:10.2307/3162089. JSTOR 3162089. S2CID 161123051.
- Hill, Marvin S. (Spring 1969). "The Shaping of the Mormon Mind in New England and New York". BYU Studies. 9 (3): 351–72.
- Hill, Marvin S. (Autumn 1970). "The Manipulation of History". Dialogue: A Journal of Mormon Thought. 5 (3): 96–99. doi:10.2307/45224182. JSTOR 45224182. S2CID 254398281.
- Hill, Marvin S. (Winter 1972). "Joseph Smith and the 1826 Trial: New Evidence and New Difficulties". BYU Studies. 12 (2): 223–33.
- Hill, Marvin S. (Summer 1972). "An Uncertain Voice in the Wilderness". Dialogue: A Journal of Mormon Thought. 7 (2): 54–56. doi:10.2307/45224293. JSTOR 45224293. S2CID 254392866.
- Hill, Marvin S. (Winter 1972). "Brodie Revisited: A Reappraisal". Dialogue: A Journal of Mormon Thought. 7 (4): 72–85. doi:10.2307/45224368. JSTOR 45224368. S2CID 254311417.
- Hill, Marvin S. (March 1974). "Secular or Sectarian History?: A Critique of 'No Man Knows My History'". Church History. 43 (1): 78–96. doi:10.2307/3164082. JSTOR 3164082. S2CID 162436872.
- Hill, Marvin S. (1975). "Quest for Refuge: An Hypothesis as to the Social Origins and Nature of the Mormon Political Kingdom". Journal of Mormon History. 2: 3–20. Archived from the original on 2011-08-08.
- Hill, Marvin S. (Spring 1976). "Mormon Religion in Nauvoo: Some Reflections". Utah Historical Quarterly. 44 (2): 170–80. doi:10.2307/45059578. JSTOR 45059578. S2CID 254448884. Archived from the original on 2011-08-08.
- Hill, Marvin S. (1976). "The "Prophet Puzzle" Assembled; or, How to Treat Our Historical Diplopia toward Joseph Smith". Journal of Mormon History. 3: 101–05. Archived from the original on 2011-08-08.
- Hill, Marvin S. (1978). "The Rise of the Mormon Kingdom of God". In Richard D. Poll (ed.). Utah's History. Provo, Utah: BYU Press. pp. 97–112. ISBN 0-8425-0842-2.
- Hill, Marvin S. (Spring 1979). "A Note of Joseph Smith's First Vision and Its Import in the Shaping of Early Mormonism". Dialogue: A Journal of Mormon Thought. 12 (1): 90–99. doi:10.2307/45224752. JSTOR 45224752. S2CID 254386475.
- Hill, Marvin S. (October 1980). "The Rise of Mormonism in the Burned-Over District: Another View". New York History. 61 (4). New York State Historical Association: 411–430.
- Hill, Marvin S. (September 1980). "Cultural Crisis in the Mormon Kingdom: A Reconsideration of the Causes of Kirtland Dissent". Church History. 49 (1): 286–97. doi:10.2307/3164451. JSTOR 3164451. S2CID 161679398.
- Hill, Marvin S. (Spring 1981). "Joseph Smith the Man: Some Reflections on a Subject of Controversy". BYU Studies. 21 (2): 175–86.
- Hill, Marvin S. (Summer 1982). "The First Vision Controversy, A Critique and Reconciliation". Dialogue: A Journal of Mormon Thought. 15 (2): 31–46. doi:10.2307/45225076. JSTOR 45225076.
- Hill, Marvin S. (1984). "Richard L. Bushman: Scholar and Apologist". Journal of Mormon History. 11: 125–133. Archived from the original on 2011-08-08.
- Hill, Marvin S. (Fall 1984). "Money-Digging Folklore and the Beginnings of Mormonism: An Interpretive Suggestion". BYU Studies. 24 (4): 473–488.
- Hill, Marvin S. (1986). "Dialogue". In Charles H. Lippy (ed.). Religious Periodicals of the United States. Westport, CT: Greenwood Press. ISBN 0-313-23420-5.
- Hill, Marvin S. (Autumn 1988). "The 'New Mormon History' Reassessed in Light of Recent Books on Joseph Smith and Mormon Origins". Dialogue: A Journal of Mormon Thought. 21 (3): 115–127. doi:10.2307/45228015. JSTOR 45228015. S2CID 254387064.
- Hill, Marvin S. (June 1989). "Counter-Revolution: The Mormon Reaction to the Coming of American Democracy" (PDF). Sunstone. 13 (3): 24–33.
- Hill, Marvin S. (Fall 1990). "Afterward". BYU Studies. 30 (4): 117–124.
- Hill, Marvin S. (Spring 1994). "Positivism or Subjectivism? Some Reflections on a Mormon Historical Dilemma". Journal of Mormon History. 20 (1): 1–23. Archived from the original on 2011-08-08.
- Hill, Marvin S. (Summer 2004). "Carthage Conspiracy Reconsidered: A Second Look at the Murder of Joseph and Hyrum Smith" (PDF). Journal of the Illinois State Historical Society. 97 (2): 107–34. Archived from the original (PDF) on 2013-10-21.
- Hill, Marvin S. (Fall 2006). "By Any Standard, a Remarkable Book". Dialogue: A Journal of Mormon Thought. 39 (3): 155–63. doi:10.2307/45227297. JSTOR 45227297. S2CID 254399344.

=== Other ===
- Hill, Marvin S. (1955), An Historical Study of the Life of Orson Hyde: Early Mormon Missionary and Apostle From 1805-1852, MA thesis, Provo, Utah: Department of History, Brigham Young University
- Hill, Marvin S. (June 1968), The Role of Christian Primitivism in the Origin and Development of the Mormon Kingdom, 1830-1844, PhD dissertation, Department of History, University of Chicago

Professional and academic associations
Preceded by Ronald W. Walker	President of the Mormon History Association; 1992–1993	Succeeded by Roger D. Launius
