= Orson Hyde Memorial Garden =

Park in Jerusalem, Israel

Coordinates: 31.7809°N 35.2412°E

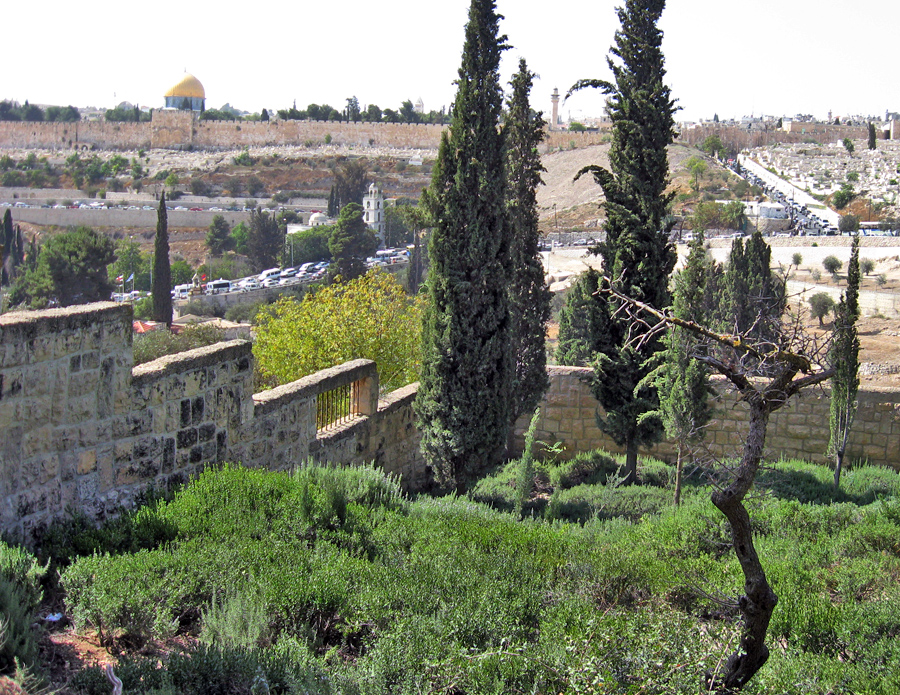
The Orson Hyde Memorial Garden in Jerusalem

The Orson Hyde Memorial Garden is a 5.5 acres (0.022 km^{2}) park on the Mount of Olives in East Jerusalem. The park was inaugurated on October 24, 1979, by the president of the Church of Jesus Christ of Latter-day Saints (LDS Church), Spencer W. Kimball. The garden is dedicated to the memory of Orson Hyde, an early church apostle who visited Jerusalem and offered a prayer on October 24, 1841, dedicating the Holy Land for the return of the Jews.

A plaque inscribed with the prayer by Hyde in English and Hebrew once stood in the park; it was removed due to vandalism. The creation of the memorial garden and an agreement by the LDS Church not to proselytise in Israel played an important part in overcoming local opposition to the construction of BYU Jerusalem Center.

The park features a 150-seat stone amphitheatre, and is noted for its views of the Kidron Valley and the Old City of Jerusalem.

== See also ==
- Judaism and Mormonism
