= Larry T. Wimmer =

American economist

Larry Turley Wimmer (born December 8, 1935) served as the Warren and Wilson Dusenberry University Professor at Brigham Young University (BYU). He is an emeritus professor of economics at BYU, who specialized in American economic history and the economics of aging.

== Biography ==
Wimmer was born in Snowflake, Arizona, lived in Showlow, Arizona, and graduated from Safford High School, Safford, Arizona.

Wimmer holds a bachelor's degree from Brigham Young University and an MA and Ph.D. from the University of Chicago. He first joined the BYU faculty in 1963, subsequently serving as Chair for nine years, and as Associate Dean of General Education for three years. He was a Fulbright Scholar in Taiwan from 1972 to 1973.

Wimmer is a member of the Church of Jesus Christ of Latter-day Saints (LDS Church), for which he has served in various roles, including as a missionary for the Church in England from 1956 to 1958, as a Bishop, and in three Stake Presidencies. He married Louise Johnson from Buhl, Idaho, in 1958, who died in 1985. They are the parents of five sons. He is currently married to Patricia Tischner Hansen, formerly of Salt Lake City, Utah.

== Publications ==
Wimmer has written several works on economic history, many of which were coauthored with Clayne L. Pope. He has also written several works on the Kirtland Safety Society, including The Kirtland Economy Revisited with Marvin S. Hill and Clifton Keith Rooker (1937 - 2022). He has also written on the gold crisis of 1869.

He authored a letter to Martin Luther King in 1966, and asked Dr. King for any materials he could use to challenge claims from the "ultra-right" that Dr. King was a communist. This letter was written 12 years before the LDS Church granted equal rights to black members.
