= Orson Hyde =

American religious leader (1805–1878)

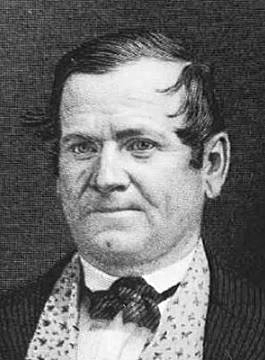

President of the Quorum of the Twelve Apostles
- December 27, 1847 – April 10, 1875
- Predecessor: Brigham Young
- Successor: John Taylor
- End reason: John Taylor replaced Hyde as President of the Quorum

Quorum of the Twelve Apostles
- June 27, 1839 – November 28, 1878

Quorum of the Twelve Apostles
- February 15, 1835 – May 4, 1839
- Called by: Three Witnesses
- End reason: Removed from Quorum by a vote of the church

LDS Church Apostle
- February 15, 1835 – November 28, 1878
- Called by: Three Witnesses
- Reason: Initial organization of Quorum of the Twelve
- End reason: Death
- Reorganization at end of term: Moses Thatcher ordained

Personal details
- Born: January 8, 1805; Oxford, Connecticut, United States
- Died: November 28, 1878 (aged 73); Spring City, Utah Territory, United States

Orson Hyde (January 8, 1805 – November 28, 1878) was a leader in the early Latter Day Saint movement and a member of the first Quorum of the Twelve Apostles. He was the president of the Quorum of the Twelve Apostles of the Church of Jesus Christ of Latter-day Saints (LDS Church) from 1847 to 1875 and was a missionary of the LDS Church in the United States, Europe, and the Ottoman Empire.

== Early life ==
Hyde was born on January 8, 1805, in Oxford, Connecticut, to Nathan Hyde and Sally Thorpe. His father served in the War of 1812. His mother died when he was seven years old, and Hyde and his eleven siblings were "scattered among several foster parents." In 1812, he moved to Derby, Connecticut, where he was raised under the care of Nathan Wheeler. When he was 14 years old, Hyde walked from Derby, Connecticut to Kirtland, Ohio, where he settled with Wheeler. He was employed as a retail clerk in Kirtland. Hyde joined the local Methodist church in 1827, and then later affiliated with the Reformed Baptist Society (later Disciples of Christ or Campbellites). He was a Campbellite pastor in Mentor, Ohio, in 1830.

== Church membership and service ==
When Oliver Cowdery and other Latter Day Saint missionaries preached in Kirtland in late 1830, Hyde spoke publicly against the Book of Mormon. However, when his former minister, Sidney Rigdon, joined the Church of Christ, Hyde investigated the claims of the missionaries and was baptized by Rigdon in October 1831. Rigdon and Joseph Smith ordained him as an elder later that month, and Oliver Cowdery ordained him as a high priest on the 26th of October. Hyde was called and appointed to serve on a succession of missions for the church, serving alongside Hyrum Smith, Samuel H. Smith, and John Gould. His first mission call was extended in November 1831 to preach the gospel in Orange, Ohio then he was again called in January 1832 to go with Samuel H. Smith to "take their journey into the eastern countries and proclaim" the gospel to the inhabitants there. His mission proved successful as he baptized many during his time in the eastern states, which included Connecticut, Maine, and Massachusetts. During one trip, Hyde traveled about 2,000 miles (3,200 km) on foot between New York, Rhode Island, Massachusetts, and Maine. He discussed his new faith with his old Campbellite acquaintances during these missions.

Hyde was present for the founding of the School of the Prophets in 1833. He then marched with Zion's Camp in 1834 and became one of the members of the first presiding high council in Kirtland, Ohio. He was ordained an apostle of the church on February 15, 1835, as one of the original Quorum of the Twelve, being fifth in seniority. David Whitmer, Oliver Cowdery, and Martin Harris performed Hyde's ordination. After becoming an apostle, Hyde served additional missions to Vermont, New Hampshire, New York, and Canada. He also embarked on a mission with Heber C. Kimball to Great Britain in 1837, returning home in 1838. Their efforts were successful in bringing approximately 1,500 converts to the faith.

Upon returning from Britain, Hyde found the church in a period of persecution and internal dissension. He traveled to Missouri where he fell sick enough to be bed-bound. Thomas B. Marsh and his family took Hyde in and cared for him away from the violence surrounding rest of the church members and, as they did, a grudge they had against the church poisoned his perspective. Marsh then swore out an affidavit before the justice of the peace of Ray County, Missouri saying that the Latter-day Saints there had organized a vigilante group, "who have taken an oath to support the heads of the church in all things that they say or do, whether right or wrong;" that church vigilantes had burned and looted non-Mormon settlements in Daviess County; and that:

The plan of said Smith, the prophet, is to take this State, and he professes to his people to intend taking the United States, and ultimately the whole world. This is the belief of the church, and my own opinion of the prophet's plans and intentions."

Bed-bound, sick and isolated, Hyde swore before the same justice on the same day that he either knew Marsh's statements to be true or believed them to be such.

Because he had signed the Richmond affidavit with Marsh, Hyde was disfellowshipped (disciplined, but not removed from membership) in 1838. On May 4, 1839, he was removed from the Quorum of the Twelve Apostles. The church leadership invited Hyde to explain his actions. On June 27, Hyde returned to the church and publicly explained himself, recanting his affidavit and asking to be restored. He was readmitted into the Quorum the same day in Nauvoo, Illinois.

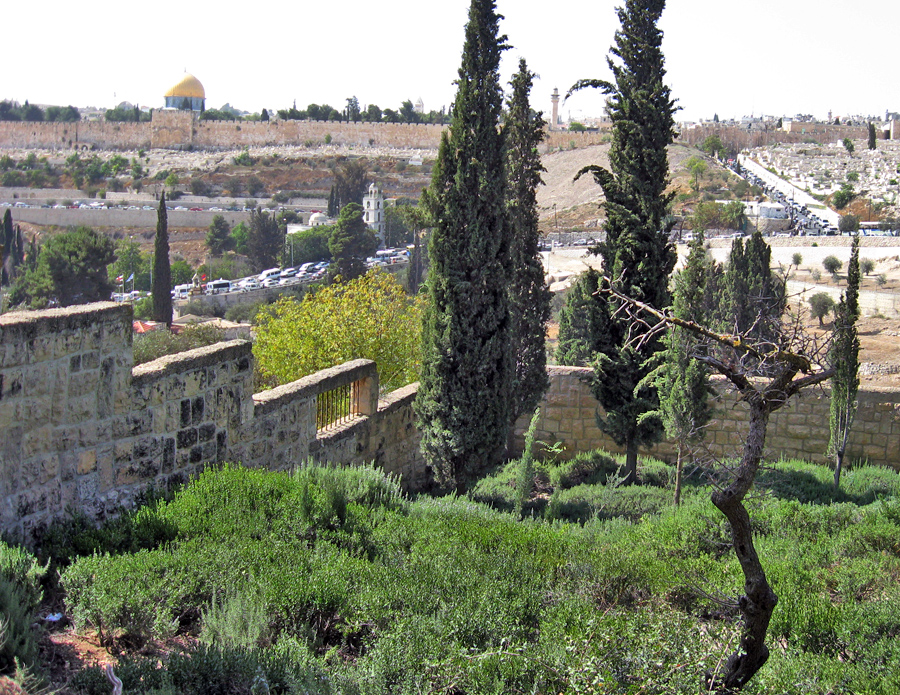
The Orson Hyde Memorial Garden, in Jerusalem

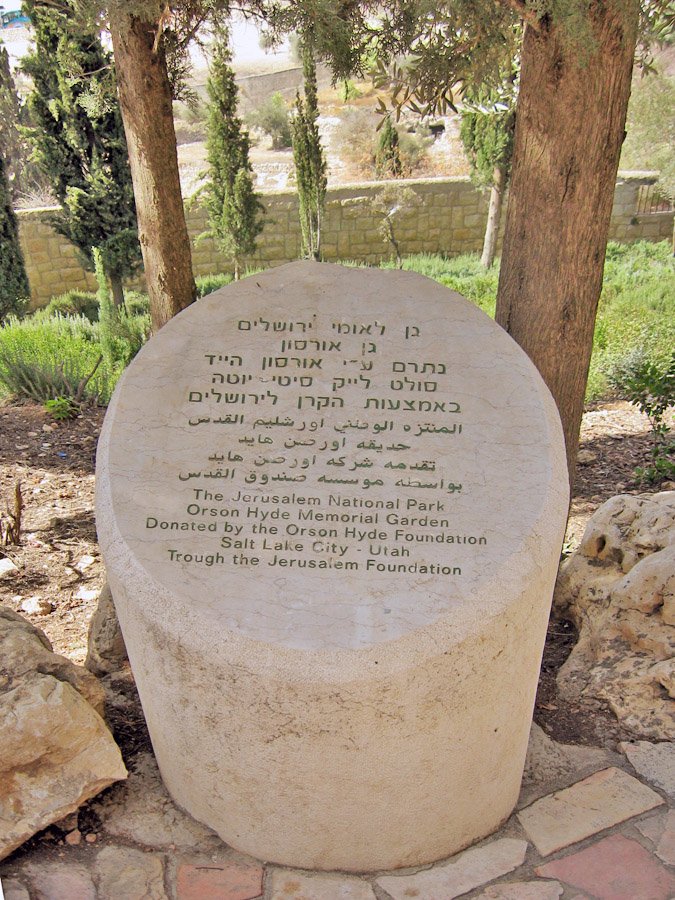
Stone marker at the Orson Hyde Memorial Garden in Jerusalem

== Mission to Jerusalem ==
As early as 1832, when he was a newly baptized member of the church eager to know the will of the Lord, Hyde sought direction from Joseph Smith, whom he considered to be a prophet. In a blessing Hyde received in 1832 at the hands of Smith, Hyde was told, “Thou shalt go to Jerusalem . . . and be a watchman unto the house of Israel; and by thy hands shall the Most High do a good work, which shall prepare the way, and greatly facilitate the gathering together of that people.”

Eight years after receiving this blessing, Orson Hyde had a vision in March 1840 in which the Spirit told him he was to visit the cities of London, Amsterdam, Constantinople, and Jerusalem, and that in Jerusalem he was to declare to those of Judah that they must "gather together," "assemble yourselves," and "go into the defenced cities." One month after this vision, on April 6, 1840, Orson Hyde spoke at a church general conference in Nauvoo, Illinois. In his address, Hyde said that “it had been prophesied, some years ago [referring to his 1832 blessing], that he had a great work to perform among the Jews; and that he had recently been moved upon by the Spirit of the Lord to visit that people.” When Hyde concluded speaking, Joseph Smith motioned to those in attendance at the conference and resolved that Hyde should proceed on a mission to Jerusalem. This Hyde did with a prayer on October 24, 1841, in which he dedicated the Holy Land for the return of the Jews.

According to the minutes from the April 6, 1840 general conference, at which Hyde was dispatched, "Elder John E. Page then rose, and spoke with much force on the subject of Elder Hyde’s mission," and on the last day of the conference, Joseph Smith “stated that since Elder Hyde had been appointed to visit the Jews, he had felt an impression that it would be well for Elder John E. Page to accompany him on his mission.” The two elders, Hyde and Page, left Nauvoo and embarked on their mission on 15 April 1840. For the following months, Hyde and Page traveled as circumstances allowed, sometimes together and at other times apart. In the end, however, Page "failed to accompany him" all the way to Jerusalem. They parted ways when Hyde waited for Page in New York City for several months, but Page never arrived, so Hyde set out for Jerusalem alone, as he had foreseen in his vision.

His letter of introduction claimed that "The Jewish nations have been scattered abroad among the Gentiles for a long period; and in our estimation, the time of the commencement of their return to the Holy Land has already arrived." He left the United States and traveled through Germany, the Ottoman Empire, and Egypt before arriving in Jerusalem. He stayed in Bavaria for a while to learn the German language.

Hyde was only in Jerusalem for a few days. He arrived there on Thursday, October 21, 1841, and stayed until Monday, October 25, 1841. He recorded that before dawn on October 24, 1841, he climbed up the Mount of Olives overlooking the city, then both wrote and recited a prayer, part of which reads:

Now, O Lord! Thy servant has been obedient to the heavenly vision which Thou gavest him in his native land; and under the shadow of Thine outstretched arm, he has safely arrived in this place to dedicate and consecrate this land unto Thee, for the gathering together of Judah's scattered remnants, according to the predictions of the holy Prophets -- for the building up of Jerusalem again after it has been trodden down by the Gentiles so long, and for rearing a Temple in honor of Thy name. Everlasting thanks be ascribed unto Thee, O Father, Lord of heaven and earth, that Thou hast preserved Thy servant from the dangers of the seas, and from the plague and pestilence which have caused the land to mourn. The violence of man has also been restrained, and Thy providential care by night and by day has been exercised over Thine unworthy servant. Accept, therefore, O Lord, the tribute of a grateful heart for all past favors, and be pleased to continue Thy kindness and mercy towards a needy worm of the dust.

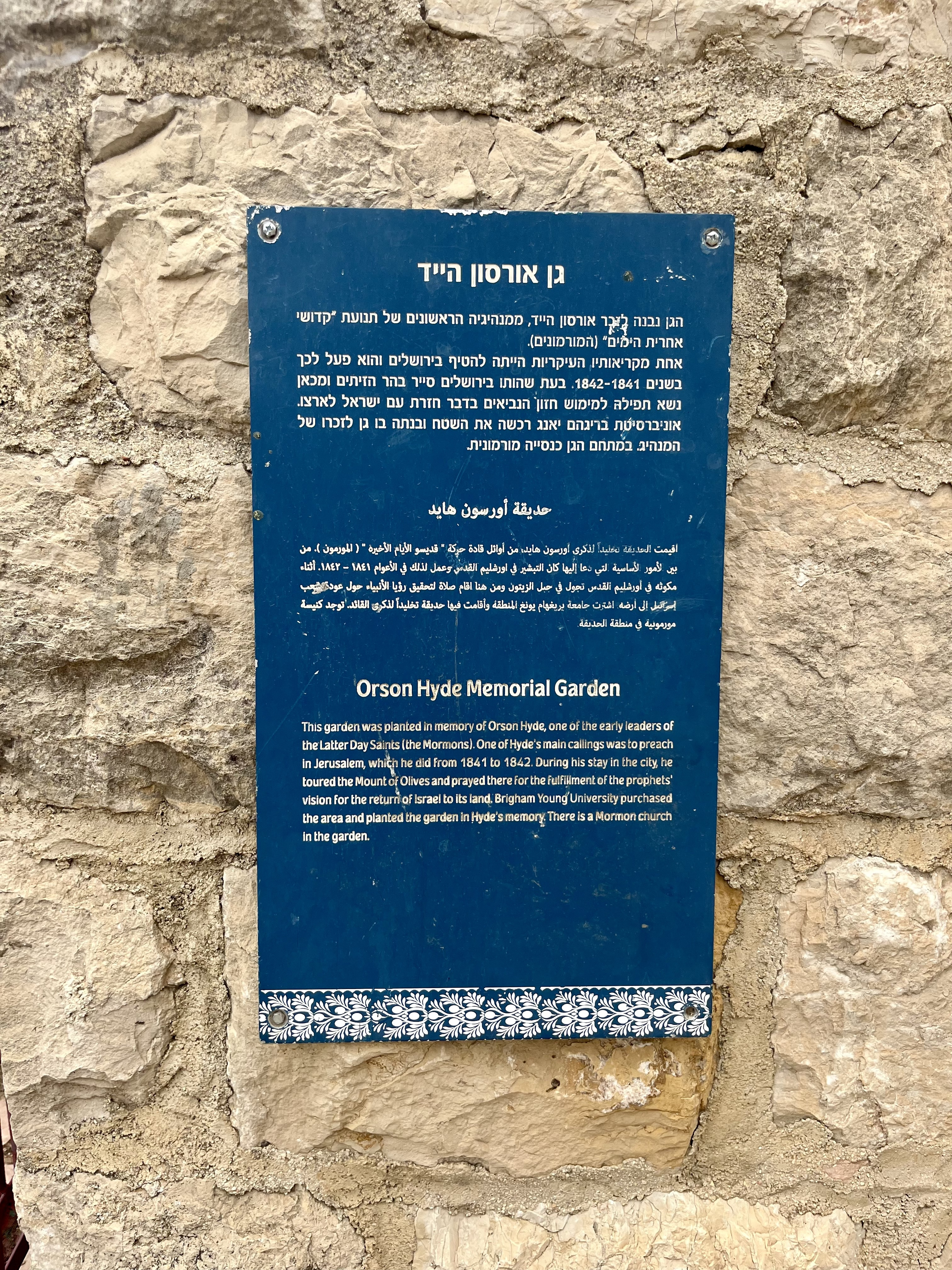
Sign located at the entrance of the Orson Hyde Memorial Garden

Having dedicated Jerusalem for the gathering of the Jews, Hyde departed the mountain after building a small altar with stones. Nearly a year later, Orson Hyde returned to America. He traveled back by way of Regensburg, Germany where he spent a number of months working on a church publication in German. He finally arrived home to his wife and two daughters in Nauvoo on December 7, 1842, having been gone for a few months shy of three years.

Since Orson Hyde's dedicatory mission, the Holy Land has been "formally dedicated for the return of Judah and the house of Israel in at least ten other dedicatory prayers."

The Orson Hyde Memorial Garden on the Mount of Olives was dedicated in 1979. The park was funded by donations to the Orson Hyde Foundation through the Jerusalem Foundation. The sign at the front of the Orson Hyde Memorial Garden was created by the Israeli government; however, it contains several mistakes that are common misconceptions about Hyde's mission to Jerusalem: 1) Unlike most other missions, Hyde was not called to preach the gospel in Jerusalem but to dedicate the land for the gathering of Judah, and 2) Hyde was only in Jerusalem for several days, although it is true that he was traveling to and from Jerusalem during the years 1841–1842.

== Family life ==
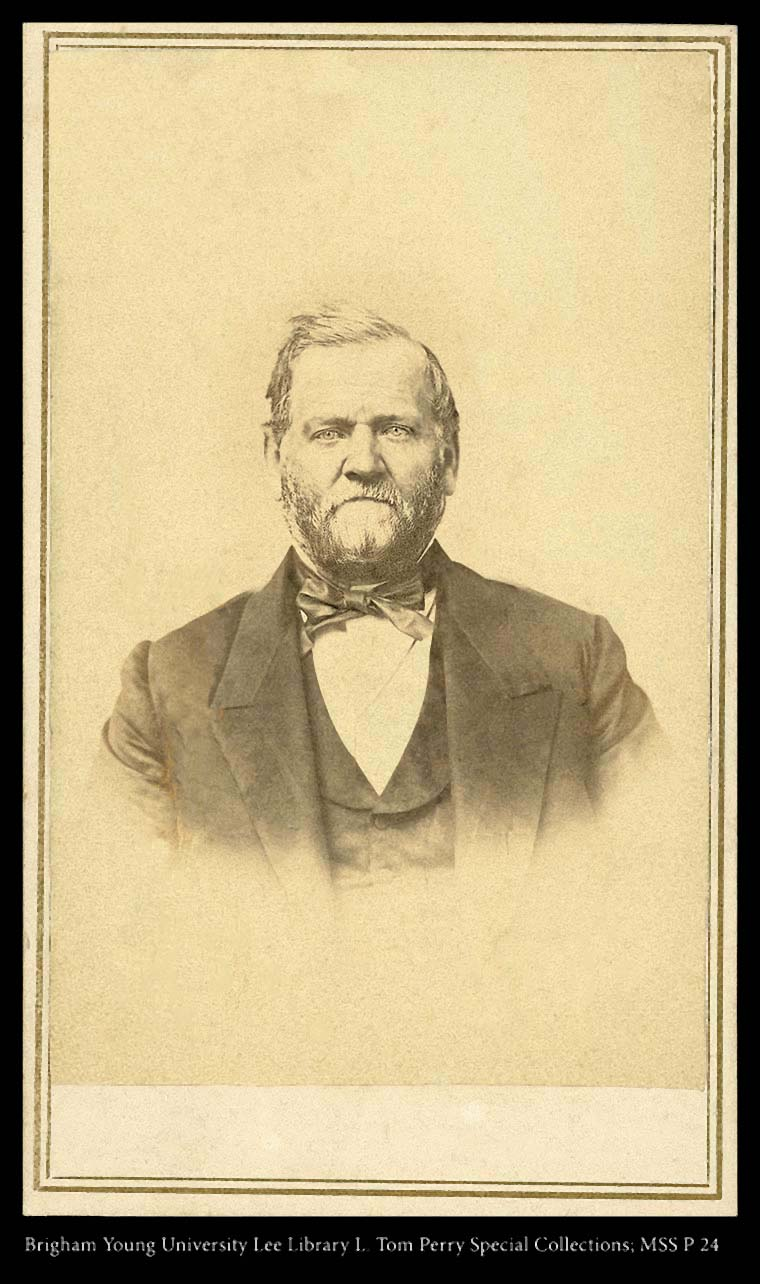
Orson Hyde around 1862

Hyde married Marinda Nancy Johnson, in Kirtland, Ohio, on September 4, 1834. Joseph Smith was sealed to Marinda as a plural wife either in April 1842, or in May 1843. Marinda signed an affidavit saying that her sealing to Joseph Smith occurred in May 1843. However, one of Smith's scribes, Thomas Bullock, later wrote a list of plural marriage dates in the back of one of Smith's journals and noted a sealing date of April 1842. It is not clear when or if Hyde learned about his wife's sealing to Smith, however, John D. Lee, in his book Mormonism Unveiled, reported that Hyde may have given his consent. Three months after his return from his mission, Hyde learned about plural marriage and married two additional wives. He ultimately took eight wives and fathered 32 children. He and Johnson divorced in 1870.

== Later life ==
Hyde served on the Nauvoo City Council from 1843 to 1845 and joined the Council of Fifty on March 13, 1844. After Joseph Smith's death in 1844, he oversaw the completion of the Nauvoo Temple, which was dedicated in 1846, just before the church members left for Iowa territory. He moved with them to the staging grounds at Council Bluffs, Iowa, for their trek west and to oversaw their emigration to Utah. He then was sent to England, presiding over the British Mission from 1846 to 1847. During this trip, he also served as editor of the Millennial Star, the Latter-day Saint publication in England. Upon his return to the United States, he became President of the Quorum of the Twelve in 1847. Hyde was placed in charge of the church in the Midwest, remaining in Council Bluffs, Iowa, until 1852. He published the Frontier Guardian in Council Bluffs. He then joined the main body of the church in Utah Territory in 1852.

Hyde served as an associate judge for Utah Territory for the U.S. Supreme Court beginning in 1852. During the settlement of the territory, Brigham Young called Hyde to lead settlement groups to Carson Valley, Nevada, and the Sanpete–Sevier District in Utah. He also led an expedition to the Green River in 1853. Hyde was a member of the Manti Temple Building Committee and the Utah Territorial Assembly until he was sent to settle Spring City, Utah.

When dealing with the question of seniority in the council in 1875, long after the death of Joseph Smith, Brigham Young ruled that, if a council member had been disciplined and removed from the council, his seniority was based on the date of readmission. By this ruling, in June 1875, both Hyde and apostle Orson Pratt were moved down in quorum seniority. So, when Hyde repented in 1839, he effectively joined the quorum as a new member. As a result of this ruling, John Taylor replaced Hyde as president of the Quorum of the Twelve Apostles in 1875.

== Death and legacy ==
Hyde died in Spring City on November 28, 1878 at 72 years of age. He was succeeded by Moses Thatcher in the Quorum of the Twelve Apostles. He is buried at Spring City. Hyde is mentioned by name in six sections of the Doctrine and Covenants: sections 68, 75, 100, 102, 103, and 124. In his Latter-day Saint Biographical Encyclopedia, Andrew Jenson describes Hyde as "a man of great natural ability, and by industrious application had acquired a good education, which, with his great and varied experience and extended travels, rendered him a powerful instrument in the hands of God for the defense and dissemination of the gospel and the building up of the Latter-day Work."

== Notes ==
Religious titles
Preceded by Brigham Young	President of the Quorum of the Twelve Apostles; December 27, 1847–June 1875	Succeeded by John Taylor
Preceded by Heber C. Kimball	Quorum of the Twelve Apostles; February 15, 1835–May 4, 1839	Succeeded by William E. M'Lellin
Preceded by George A. Smith	Quorum of the Twelve Apostles; June 27, 1839–November 28, 1878	Succeeded by William Smith
