= The Church of Jesus Christ of Latter-day Saints in Ohio =

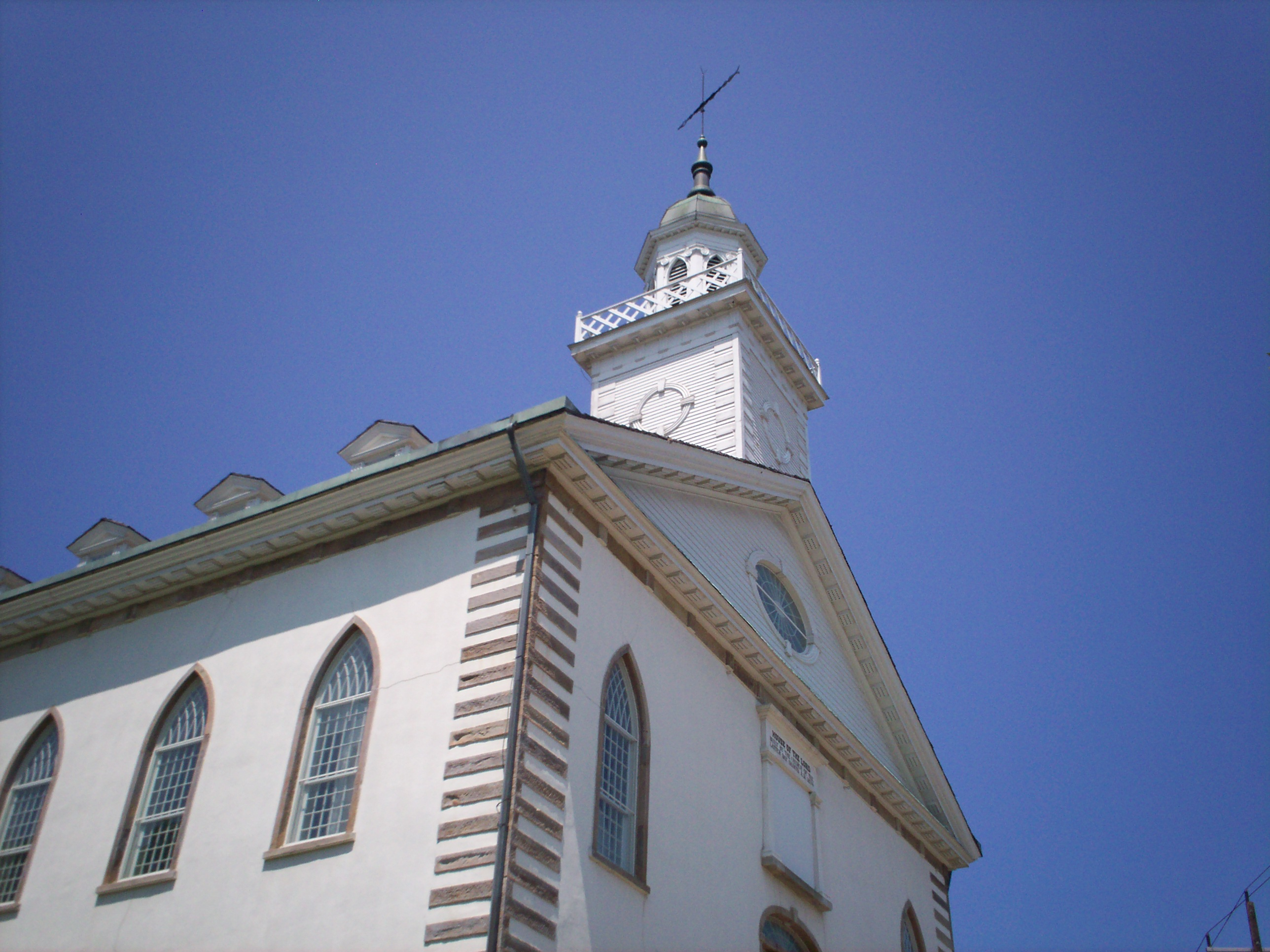
- The Kirtland Temple
- Area: US Northeast
- Members: 65,991 (2025)
- Stakes: 15
- Wards: 99
- Branches: 33
- Total Congregations: 132
- Missions: 2
- Temples: 2 operating 1 under construction 3 total
- FamilySearch Centers: 46

The Church of Jesus Christ of Latter-day Saints in Ohio refers to the Church of Jesus Christ of Latter-day Saints (LDS Church) and its members in Ohio. The official church membership as a percentage of general population was 0.52% in 2014. According to the 2014 Pew Forum on Religion & Public Life survey, roughly 1% of Ohioans self-identify themselves most closely with The Church of Jesus Christ of Latter-day Saints. The LDS Church is the 14th largest denomination in Ohio.

Stakes are located in Akron, Cincinnati (3), Cleveland, Columbus (4), Dayton (3), Hiram, Kirtland, Toledo, and Zanesville.

== History ==
Membership in Ohio
Year	Membership
1983	26,028
1989*	37,000
1999	47,437
2009	57,918
2019	62,023
2025	65,991
*Membership was published as a rounded number. Source: Wendall J. Ashton; Jim M. Wall, Deseret News, various years, Church Almanac State Information: Ohio

The church has two distinct periods in Ohio, the first being from 1831 to 1838, often known as the Kirtland era, and the second largely beginning in the early 20th century with the establishment of the first branches of the church in Ohio since the Kirtland era. In the time between the two periods, LDS missionaries occasionally visited Ohio, but the church did not have any official presence in the state.

The earliest missionaries visited Ohio in October 1830 shortly after the church was organized and found success. Parley P. Pratt, who had been living in Amherst, Ohio, had joined the church in New York in September 1830, and agreed to serve as a missionary. As part of his preaching, he visited his associate and prominent Campbellite minister Sidney Rigdon in Mentor, Ohio. Rigdon was receptive and joined the church in November 1830, which led to a number of his congregants joining as well. Joseph Smith Jr. received what is now Doctrine and Covenants sections 37 and 38 in December 1830, which called the early church members to gather in Ohio. Joseph and Emma Smith arrived in Kirtland in February 1831 and it subsequently became headquarters of the church. From September 1831 to March 1832, the church was headquartered in Hiram, Ohio, while the Smiths lived at the home of John and Elsa Johnson.

While in Ohio, the church experienced a number of major developments both organizational and doctrinal, including the creations of the First Presidency in 1832, Quorum of the Twelve Apostles in 1835, and the first stake in 1834, along with the construction and dedication of the first temple in 1836. Of the 138 sections of the modern LDS Doctrine and Covenants, 65 were received in Ohio, including 46 in Kirtland alone. At its peak, the Kirtland area was home to approximately 3,200 members. Developments at the other center of church activity in western Missouri combined with economic fallout from the Panic of 1837 and the collapse of the Kirtland Safety Society led Smith and other church leaders, along with most church members, to leave Kirtland in 1838. The largest group, approximately 500 people, left Kirtland in July 1838 as part of the Kirtland Camp.

While other Latter Day Saint movement groups maintained a presence in Ohio, the Church of Jesus Christ of Latter-day Saints had little to no permanent presence in the area for much of the early 20th century outside of missionaries. Ohio was part of the Northern States Mission created in the late 1870s and a succession of other multi-state missions until the creation of the Ohio Mission in 1967. Informal branches were established as early as 1876, with a branch in Cincinnati dating to the early 1900s, a branch in Akron organized in 1917 and a branch in Columbus in 1925. The first building built by the church since the Kirtland era was a meetinghouse in Columbus dedicated in 1930. The Cincinnati Ohio Stake, the first stake in the state since the original Kirtland Stake, was created in 1958. It was followed by the Cleveland Stake in 1961 and the Columbus Stake in 1962.

The church began acquiring historic sites with the purchase of the John and Elsa Johnson Home in 1956 and the Newel K. Whitney store in 1976, adding additional significant historic properties over the years. The Johnson Home was restored to its 1830s appearance and dedicated in 2001 by Gordon B. Hinckley, who was serving as President of the Church at the time. The following year, the church began a $15 million project in Kirtland to create a small historic village centered around the Whitney home and store known as Historic Kirtland Village. The project restored the Whitney Home to its 1830s appearance, built a new visitors' center, and rebuilt multiple buildings from the 1830s on or near their original foundations. It also led to two major roads being rerouted around the sites to allow for pedestrian traffic. The project was dedicated in May 2003, also by Hinckley. About 100,000 people, mostly church members, visit the site annually. The church acquired the home of Joseph and Emma Smith in 2012 from Community of Christ and restored it to its 1830s appearance in 2023, followed by the Kirtland Temple and adjacent visitors' center, also from Community of Christ, in 2024.

== Stakes ==
As of August 2026, the following stakes are located in Ohio or include parts of Ohio:

Stake	Organized	Mission	Temple district
Akron Ohio	25 May 1975	Ohio Columbus	Cleveland Ohio
Charleston West Virginia (Note: Stake located outside Ohio with congregation(s) meeting in Ohio)	23 Aug 1970	West Virginia Charleston	Columbus Ohio
Cincinnati Ohio	23 Nov 1958	Ohio Cincinnati	Columbus Ohio
Cincinnati Ohio East	15 Feb 2004	Ohio Cincinnati	Columbus Ohio
Cincinnati Ohio North	17 Mar 1985	Ohio Cincinnati	Columbus Ohio
Cleveland Ohio	20 Sep 1961	Ohio Columbus	Cleveland Ohio
Columbus Ohio	25 Feb 1962	Ohio Columbus	Columbus Ohio
Columbus Ohio East	28 Nov 1976	Ohio Columbus	Columbus Ohio
Columbus Ohio North	19 Oct 1986	Ohio Columbus	Columbus Ohio
Columbus Ohio South	14 Nov 2004	Ohio Columbus	Columbus Ohio
Dayton Ohio	24 May 1970	Ohio Cincinnati	Columbus Ohio
Dayton Ohio East	20 May 1979	Ohio Cincinnati	Columbus Ohio
Dayton Ohio North	21 Nov 2021	Ohio Cincinnati	Columbus Ohio
Hiram Ohio (Note: The Hiram Ohio Stake was known as the Youngstown Ohio Stake until November 24, 2024)	18 Feb 2007	Ohio Columbus	Cleveland Ohio
Huntington West Virginia	7 Nov 1982	West Virginia Charleston	Louisville Kentucky
Kirtland Ohio	17 Feb 1834 (Note: The original Kirtland Stake was dissolved in 1838); 16 Oct 1983	Ohio Columbus	Cleveland Ohio
Pittsburgh Pennsylvania West	7 Sep 2014	Pennsylvania Pittsburgh	Pittsburgh Pennsylvania
Toledo Ohio	2 Nov 1980	Michigan Detroit	Columbus Ohio
Zanesville Ohio	6 Mar 2022	Ohio Columbus	Columbus Ohio

== Historic sites ==
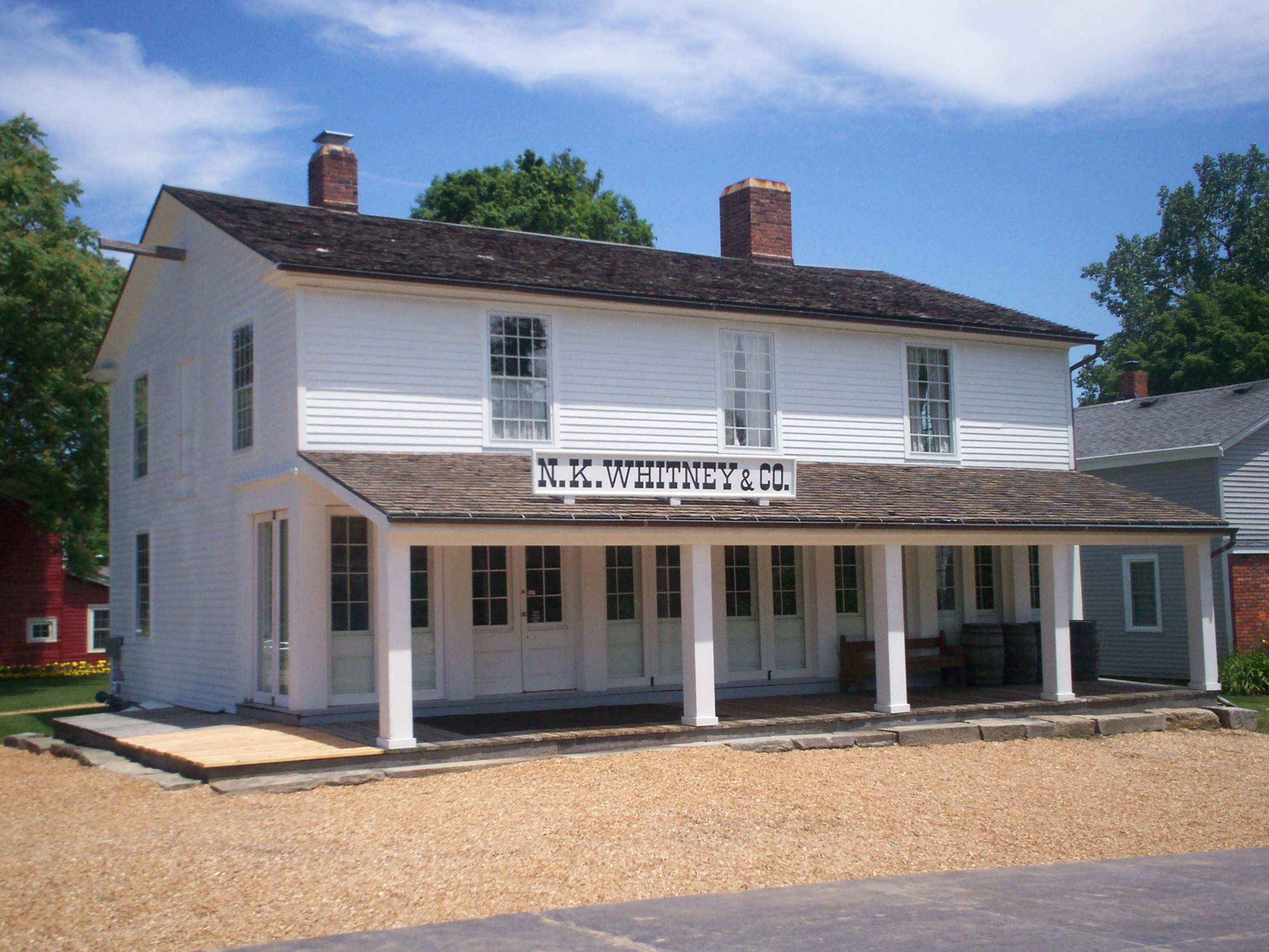
The Newel K. Whitney Store in Kirtland, Ohio

As headquarters of the church from 1831 to 1838, there are a number of significant church historic sites in Ohio, many of which are in the northeastern part of the state. The church maintains and operates several historic sites in and near Kirtland, while several additional sites are either general locations or are owned by outside entities.

=== General sites ===
- Amherst, community west of Cleveland where Parley P. Pratt joined the church in 1830 and later preached. A branch was established there in 1831. In January 1832, a church conference was held there and Doctrine & Covenants section 75 was received.
- Fairport Harbor, community north of Kirtland along Lake Erie that was a debarking point for many of the early church members moving to Ohio from western New York and other locations, as well as an embarking point for missionaries leaving the area.
- Kirtland
  - Kirtland Historic North Cemetery, owned and maintained by the city of Kirtland and located in between the Kirtland Temple and Joseph Smith properties. Many early church members are buried here.
  - Stannard Quarry, located in the Chapin Forest Reservation and location where sandstone was quarried to build the Kirtland Temple
- Kirtland Camp Historical Marker near Dayton, a historical marker commemorating the 30-day encampment of the Kirtland Camp along the Mad River in 1838
- Orange Township, community southeast of Cleveland and southwest of Kirtland that was home to several early Saints and site of a church conference in 1831.
- Thompson Township, community east of Kirtland that was home to early settlers in 1831 including the relocated Colesville Branch.

=== Church-owned sites ===
- Historic Kirtland Village in Kirtland includes a mix of original and restored structures related to the early church activity in Kirtland during the 1830s. The church created a pedestrian village in 2002 by rerouting parts of two major roads around the area.
  - East Branch of the Chagrin River, site of many early baptisms of church members using ponds created by dams for water power
  - Historic Kirtland Visitors' Center
  - John Johnson Inn, replica of the 1820s building, rebuilt in 2002 on the original site. The original Johnson Inn, which was the first brick building in Kirtland, was purchased by the church in 1833 and was mainly used for lodging and offices and was managed by John Johnson. It burned down in 1915.
  - Joseph and Emma Smith Home, the mid-1830s home of Joseph and Emma Smith, purchased by the church in 2012 from Community of Christ and restored to its 1830s appearance in 2023.
  - Kirtland Flats Schoolhouse, replica of 1819 schoolhouse rebuilt near its original location. The schoolhouse was used for public education and gatherings and church meetings
  - Newel K. and Elizabeth Ann Whitney Home, original 1824 home of Newel and Elizabeth Whitney, restored to its 1830s appearance
  - N. K. Whitney & Co. Store, original 1826 store of Newel K. Whitney, also used as a home of Joseph and Emma Smith during the early 1830s and for various church meetings, including the School of the Prophets
  - Sawmill and ashery, replicas of commercial enterprises used and operated by early church members, particularly Newel K. Whitney, both rebuilt in 2002 near their original sites.
- John Johnson Farm near Hiram, original 1828 home of John and Elsa Johnson and also home to Joseph and Emma Smith from 1831-1832. It was purchased by the church in 1956 and restored to its original appearance in 2001.
- Kirtland Temple and Visitors’ Center in Kirtland, original 1836 temple and the adjoining visitors' center, built by Community of Christ in 2007. Both properties were acquired by the church in 2024.
- Morley Farm in Kirtland Hills

== Missions ==
There are two missions based in Ohio as of 2026, the Ohio Columbus Mission and the Ohio Cincinnati Mission, and the Michigan Detroit Mission covers much of Northwest Ohio. The Columbus mission was established in 1967 as the Ohio Mission and was renamed the Ohio–West Virginia Mission in 1972 followed by the Ohio Columbus Mission in 1974. It covers most of central, eastern, southeastern, and northeastern Ohio, and extends into western Pennsylvania and the northern West Virginia panhandle. The Cincinnati Mission was created in 2013. It covers southwestern Ohio and extends into eastern Kentucky and southwestern Indiana. An earlier Ohio Cincinnati Mission was in operation from 1998 to 2010.

Additionally, there are two Ohio-based missions that have been discontinued, the Ohio Cleveland Mission and the Ohio Akron Mission. The Ohio Cleveland Mission, which mainly covered northern Ohio and extended into western Pennsylvania, was in operation from 1977 to 2018. At its closure, most of the mission was assigned to the Ohio Columbus Mission, while the portion in northwestern Ohio was assigned to the Michigan Detroit Mission. The Ohio Akron Mission, which covered parts of northeast and north central Ohio, operated from 1984 to 1989. At its closure, the mission was absorbed by the Ohio Cleveland Mission.

== Temples ==
Temples in Ohio
- = Operating
- = Under construction
- = Announced
- = Closed for renovation
- = Historic site

As of November 2026, the church operates two temples in the state of Ohio, the Columbus Ohio Temple and the Cleveland Ohio Temple, and owns the Kirtland Temple, which is open to the public as a historic site. There is one temple currently under construction, the Cincinnati Ohio Temple, announced by President Nelson on 7 April 2024.

The Columbus temple was announced 25 April 1998 by President Gordon B. Hinckley as one of the first using the smaller design plan and was dedicated 4 September 1999, also by Hinckley. It underwent extensive renovations from 2020 to 2023 and was rededicated by President M. Russell Ballard on 3 June 2023. The Cleveland temple was announced by President Russell M. Nelson on 3 April 2022 and dedicated 16 August 2026 by Elder David A. Bednar.

The Kirtland Temple was used by the main body of the church from 1836 to 1838. Unlike current operating LDS temples, the Kirtland Temple was used primarily for religious meetings rather than ordinance work. At the time of construction, none of the ordinances associated with LDS temple worship, such as baptism by proxy, had been instituted. Operated by Community of Christ for over a century, the LDS Church acquired the Kirtland Temple in March 2024. A contract between the two churches stipulates that it will remain open to the public for a minimum of 15 years and the LDS Church indicated they have plans to continue to keep it open as a historical site beyond the contractual years.

. Kirtland Temple (Historic site); News & images	
Location: Announced: Groundbreaking: Dedicated: Size: Style: Notes:	Kirtland, Ohio, United States; December 27, 1832 by Joseph Smith; June 5, 1833; March 27, 1836 by Joseph Smith; 15,000 sq ft (1,400 m^{2}) on a 5.8-acre (2.3 ha) site Federal Georgian and New England Colonial; Ownership transferred from Community of Christ to The Church of Jesus Christ of Latter-day Saints on March 5, 2024.
60. Columbus Ohio Temple; Official website; News & images	
Location: Announced: Groundbreaking: Dedicated: Rededicated: Size: Style:	Columbus, Ohio, United States; April 25, 1998 by Gordon B. Hinckley; September 12, 1998 by John K. Carmack; September 4, 1999 by Gordon B. Hinckley; June 4, 2023 by M. Russell Ballard; 11,745 sq ft (1,091.1 m^{2}) on a 5-acre (2.0 ha) site Classic modern, single-spire design - designed by Firestone J. Mullin
221. Cleveland Ohio Temple; Official website; News & images	
Location: Announced: Groundbreaking: Dedicated: Size:	Independence, Ohio, United States; 3 April 2022 by Russell M. Nelson; 1 June 2024 by Vaiangina Sikahema; 16 August 2026 by David A. Bednar; 9,950 sq ft (924 m^{2}) on a 11.04-acre (4.47 ha) site
292. Cincinnati Ohio Temple (Under construction); Official website; News & images	
Location: Announced: Groundbreaking: Size:	Mason, Ohio, United States; 7 April 2024 by Russell M. Nelson; 7 November 2026 by Alan T. Phillips; 29,630 sq ft (2,753 m^{2}) on a 35-acre (14 ha) site

== See also ==
- The Church of Jesus Christ of Latter-day Saints membership statistics (United States)
- Ohio: Religion
