= Cleveland Ohio Temple =

Temple of the Church of Jesus Christ of Latter-day Saints in Ohio, US

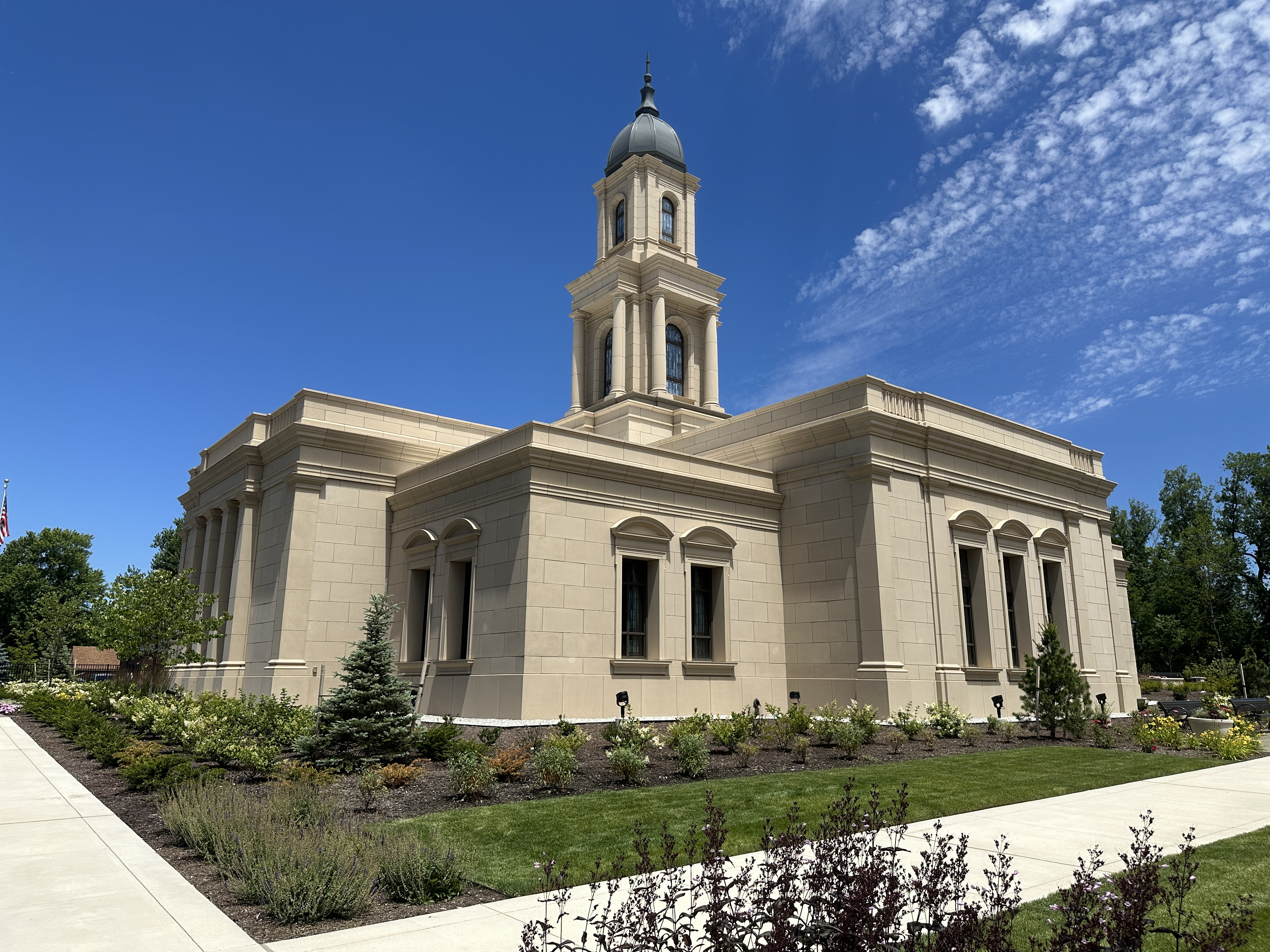
- West and south facades in 2026
- Interactive map of Cleveland Ohio Temple
- Number: 221
- Dedication: 16 August 2026, by David A. Bednar
- Site: 11.04 acres (4.47 ha)
- Floor area: 9,950 ft^{2} (924 m^{2})
- Official website • News & images

Additional information
- Announced: 3 April 2022, by Russell M. Nelson
- Groundbreaking: 1 June 2024, by Vaiangina Sikahema
- Open house: 18 June – 3 July 2026
- Current president: Sidney Allen Connor
- Location: Independence, Ohio, United States
- Coordinates: 41°24′00″N 81°38′14″W
- Baptistries: 1
- Ordinance rooms: 1 (stationary)
- Sealing rooms: 1

The Cleveland Ohio Temple is the 221st operating temple of the Church of Jesus Christ of Latter-day Saints (LDS Church), and is located in Independence, Ohio. Announced by church president Russell M. Nelson on April 3, 2022, it was one of 17 temples announced near the close of the church's 192nd annual General Conference. The official groundbreaking ceremony was held June 1, 2024, led by general authority Vai Sikahema, and the temple was dedicated by David A. Bednar, a member of the Quorum of the Twelve Apostles, on August 16, 2026.

Located on a 11.04 acres (4.47 ha) site, the temple has a single-spire design. The 9,950 square feet (924 m^{2}) structure includes one ordinance room, one sealing room, and a baptistry. The temple’s interior draws on a number of local Cleveland natural and architectural features.

It is the second modern temple in the state after the Columbus Ohio Temple, and is located roughly 20 miles (32 km) southwest of the historic Kirtland Temple. The temple district covers the four stakes based in Northeast Ohio and extends into parts of the northern panhandle of West Virginia and Western Pennsylvania.

== History ==
The temple was announced by LDS Church president Russell M. Nelson on April 3, 2022, near the close of the 192nd annual General Conference, and was one of 17 announced that day. The site in the suburb of Independence, Ohio, was announced December 22, 2022, followed by the architectural rendering on July 25, 2023.

The official groundbreaking ceremony was held June 1, 2024, and was presided over by Vai Sikahema, a general authority who was serving as first counselor of the church's North America Northeast Area presidency. The temple's open house was held from June 18 through July 3, 2026, excluding Sundays. Prior to the general public open house, a media day was held on June 15 and private tours were given for invited guests on June 16 and 17. Proclamations of support and celebration were issued by Cleveland mayor Justin Bibb, Ohio Secretary of State Frank LaRose, Ohio Treasurer Robert Sprague, and the Ohio House of Representatives. The temple was dedicated August 16, 2026, by David A. Bednar of the Quorum of the Twelve Apostles with the session broadcast to all church buildings in the temple district. It was dedicated the same day as the Belo Horizonte Brazil Temple.

== Design and architecture ==
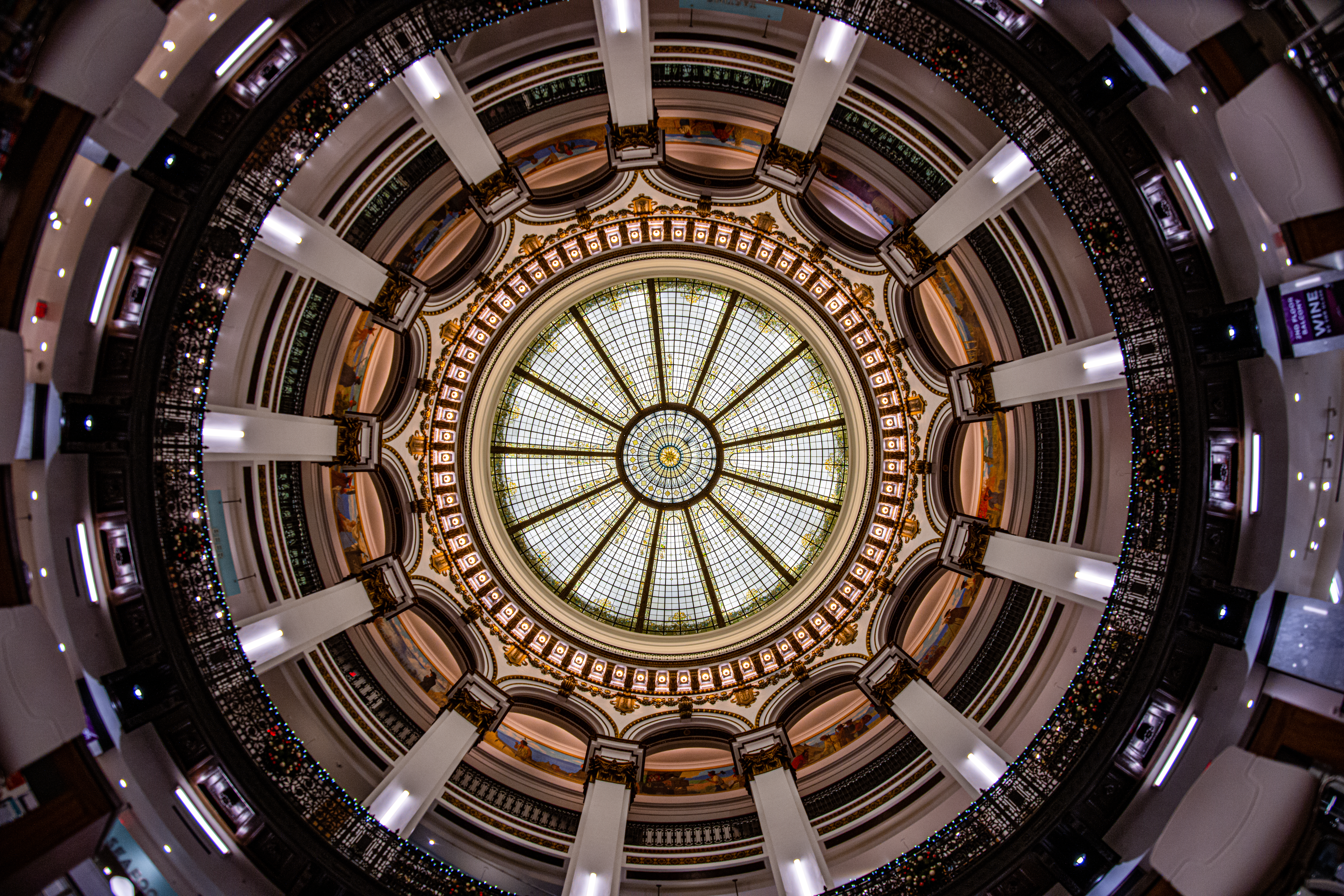
The dome of the Cleveland Trust Company Building rotunda was one of the local Cleveland landmarks that inspired the interior design of the temple

The temple site is 11.04 acres (4.47 ha) and is located along Brecksville Road (Ohio State Route 21) in the suburb of Independence, south of Cleveland. Adjacent to the site is Cleveland Clinic Courts, the main practice facility for the Cleveland Cavaliers of the National Basketball Association (NBA). Along with the temple is a small 2,200-square-foot (200 m^{2}) building that includes restrooms, a non-patron waiting area, break room, and storage for yard and building maintenance equipment.

The temple is 9,950 square feet (924 m^{2}) with a 100-foot (30 m) spire. The main structure was built primarily using prefabricated sections built offsite and then assembled onsite. The exterior is covered in Spanish Burdur Beige marble and Brazilian Azul Macaubus marble.

The interior design features elements from Cleveland's architectural heritage, as well as the northern Ohio landscape. The Trillium flexipes or white trillium, the state wildflower of Ohio, is a central theme, and the color palette, particularly the use of blue, gold, and green, and coral, symbolizes a Lake Erie sunrise and downtown Cleveland's East Fourth Street area. Patterns used in the building include diamonds inspired by the ceilings at the Cleveland Public Library main building, and the main lobby ceiling of the Terminal Tower, as well as the stained glass in Cleveland Trust Company Building rotunda. Decorative frieze bands adapted from Cleveland City Hall and the 1912 Cuyahoga County Courthouse are also present.

== Temple presidents and admittance ==
The church's temples are directed by a temple president and matron, each typically serving for a term of three years. The president and matron oversee the administration of temple operations and provide guidance and training for both temple patrons and staff. The first president is Sidney Connor, with Melody Connor serving as matron.

Like all the church's temples, it is not used for Sunday worship services. To members of the church, temples are regarded as sacred houses of the Lord. Once dedicated, only church members with a current temple recommend can enter for worship.

== See also ==
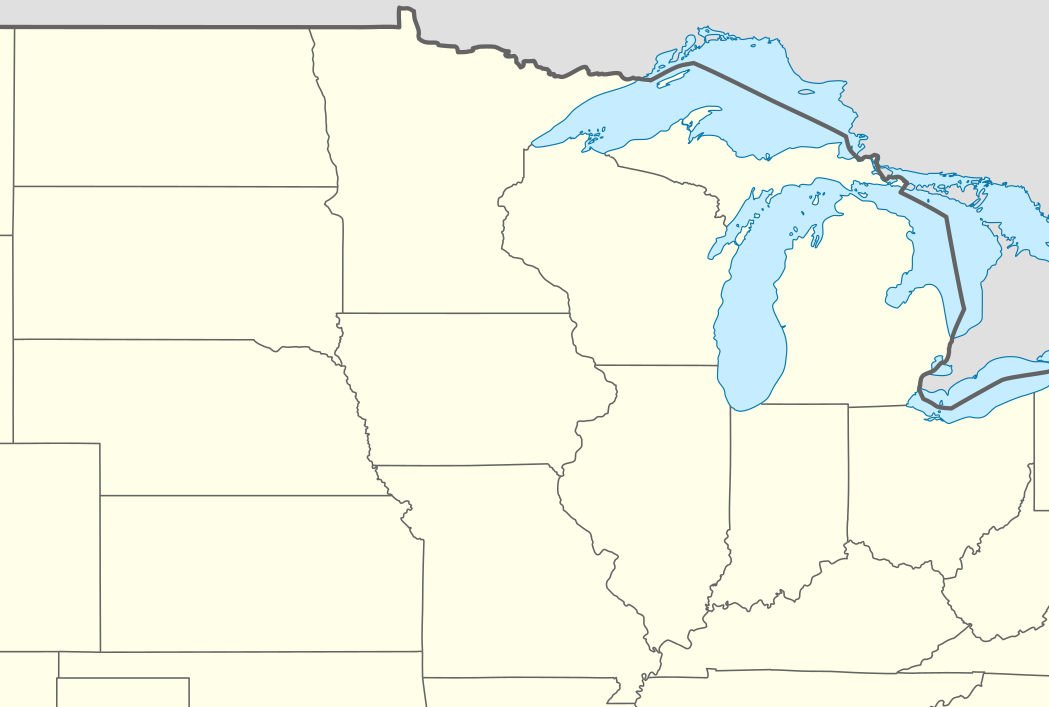
Temples in the United States Midwest
- = Operating
- = Under construction
- = Announced
- = Closed for renovation
- Comparison of temples of The Church of Jesus Christ of Latter-day Saints
- List of temples of The Church of Jesus Christ of Latter-day Saints
- List of temples of The Church of Jesus Christ of Latter-day Saints by geographic region
- Temple architecture (Latter-day Saints)
- The Church of Jesus Christ of Latter-day Saints in Ohio
