= John F. Boynton =

American Latter Day Saint leader (1811–1890)

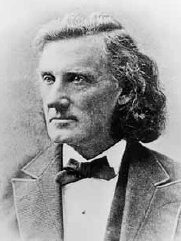

Quorum of the Twelve Apostles
- February 15, 1835 – September 3, 1837
- End reason: Disfellowshipped for apostasy

Latter Day Saint Apostle
- February 15, 1835 – December 3, 1837
- Reason: Initial organization of Quorum of the Twelve
- End reason: Excommunicated for apostasy
- Reorganization at end of term: No apostles immediately ordained

Personal details
- Born: John Farnham Boynton; September 20, 1811; Bradford, Massachusetts
- Died: October 20, 1890 (aged 79); Syracuse, New York
- Resting place: Woodlawn Cemetery; 43.0731°N 76.1276°W

John Farnham Boynton (September 20, 1811 – October 20, 1890) was an early leader in the Latter Day Saint movement and an American geologist and inventor. He was one of the original members of the Latter Day Saint movement's Quorum of the Twelve Apostles.

Boynton was born in Bradford, Massachusetts, to Eliphalet Boynton and Susan Nichols. He was married to Susan Lowell. In his teenage years, Boynton attended Columbia University and at age 20 began medical school in St. Louis, Missouri.

== Church service ==
Boynton was baptized a member of the Church of Jesus Christ of Latter Day Saints by Joseph Smith in September 1832 in Kirtland, Ohio. He was ordained to the office of an elder by Sidney Rigdon.

Boynton proved to be an effective missionary for the church. He initially served in Erie County, Pennsylvania, with Zebedee Coltrin, in 1832. The following December, Smith sent him on a mission to Maine. In an 1834 letter written from Saco, Maine, Boynton states: "I have baptized about forty in this section; Elder Even M. Greene travelled with me from 16 Jan., 1833, till October following; while together we baptized about 130." While in Maine and Massachusetts, Boynton also served with Horace Cowen.

Boynton was chosen as one of the church's apostles at the organization of the initial Quorum of Twelve Apostles on February 14, 1835. He was the only one of the original apostles who had attended university. Soon after, he accompanied the Twelve on their 1835 mission through the church branches in the eastern United States. He attended a conference in Laboro', Upper Canada, with six other members of the Quorum on June 29, 1835. Boynton returned to Ohio in the fall, and preached to a gathering of church members on October 18. After this mission, he began a mercantile business in Kirtland with church associate Lyman E. Johnson.

Despite his dedication to the church's religious message, Boynton broke with Smith and Rigdon during the Kirtland Safety Society banking controversy. In May 1837, U.S. President Andrew Jackson ordered the U.S. Treasury to accept only gold for public land, rejecting privately printed paper money such as the Safety Society and other unchartered community institutions produced. This ultimately caused the Kirtland bank to fail. The failure of the financial institution, founded with the support of church leaders, led to widespread dissent in 1837. Two distinct factions developed in the community, with members of the church's leadership aligned on both sides. Boynton explained that his difficulties with the church resulted from "the failure of the bank" which he had understood "was instituted by the will & revelations of God, & he had been told that it would never fail."

A high council trial disfellowshipped and removed Luke Johnson, Lyman E. Johnson, and Boynton from the Quorum of the Twelve on September 3, 1837. However, the dissenters, led by Boynton, Warren Parrish, Martin Harris, and Luke Johnson, had a strong local following and took physical control of the Kirtland Temple, the major financial asset of the church. They also sought to control the church organization and led a competing high council which excommunicated Smith and Rigdon, who left the city and fled to Far West, Missouri.

In 1838, after Smith had relocated to Missouri, Boynton and other dissident church leaders, including Oliver Cowdery, David Whitmer, and the Johnsons, were excommunicated. Boynton believed Smith to have become a "fallen prophet" and said to Heber C. Kimball, "if you are such a fool as to go at the call of the fallen prophet, Joseph Smith, I will not help you a dime, and if you are cast on Van Diemen's Land, I will not make an effort to help you."

Boynton later became a member of Warren Parrish's reformed "Church of Christ", which took possession of the Kirtland Temple.

Although he never rejoined the faith, Boynton is reported to have later become less antagonistic toward his former associates. His nephew (son of his sister, Olive Boynton Hale), Alma Helaman Hale, of Grantsville, Utah Territory, reported that Boynton visited Brigham Young (also one of the original members of the Quorum of the Twelve) during a visit to Utah Territory and counseled Erastus Snow to continue his efforts and involvement with the church.

== Scientific work ==
After parting ways with the church, Boynton traveled throughout the United States lecturing on natural history, geology, and other sciences. Between 1853 and 1854, he joined a U.S. government geological surveying expedition to California. During the American Civil War, Boynton was employed by the U.S. to design torpedoes and other weapons. He holds 36 patents in the U.S. National Patent Office. Boynton patented:

- A process to generate carbonic acid gas
- A soda fountain
- A portable fire extinguisher
- A vacuum process for extracting gold from ore
- Several small electrical appliances
- A process for converting cast iron to malleable steel

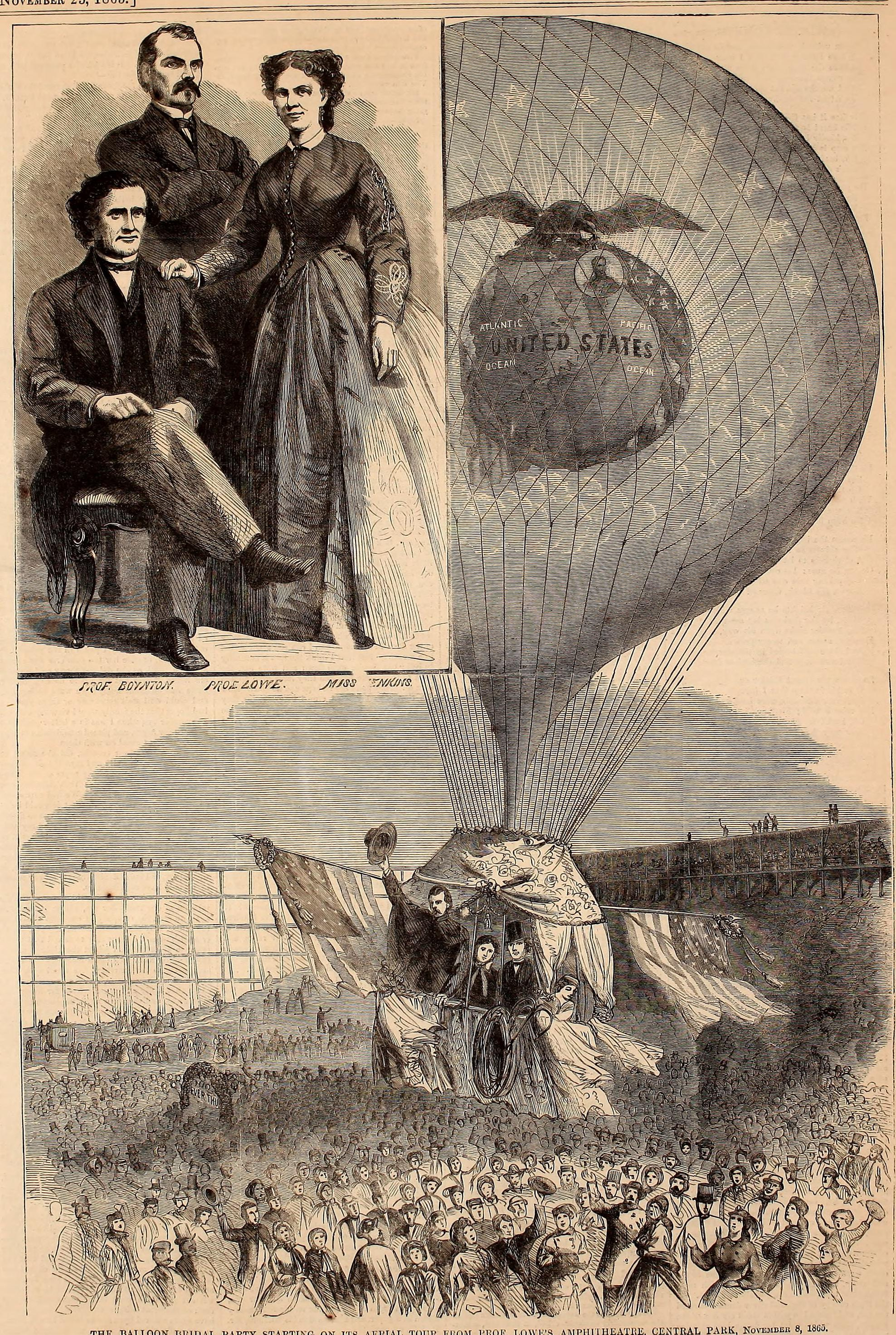
In 1865 Boynton remarried Mary West Jenkins. The balloon bridal party started on its aerial tour from Prof. Lowe's Amphitheater, Central Park, on November 8, Harper's Weekly

In 1869, Boynton was the first geologist to examine the Cardiff Giant after it was unearthed near Cardiff, New York. Boynton declared that the giant could not be a fossilized man, but hypothesized that it was a statue that was carved by a French Jesuit in the 16th or 17th century in order to impress the local Native Americans. The giant was later determined to be a hoax.

Boynton died in Syracuse, New York.

== Published works ==
- Boynton, John F. (1884). A Treatise on Maiz, Clover, Silos and Ensilage. Columbia Press. ISBN B00089EPEK.

== Notes ==
Church of the Latter Day Saints titles
Preceded by Orson Pratt	Quorum of the Twelve Apostles; February 15, 1835–September 3, 1837	Succeeded by Lyman E. Johnson
