= Lyman E. Johnson =

American Mormon leader (1811–1859)

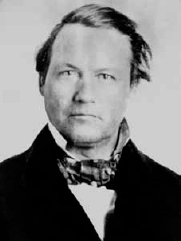

Quorum of the Twelve Apostles
- February 14, 1835 – September 3, 1837
- Called by: Three Witnesses
- End reason: Excommunicated for apostasy

Latter Day Saint Apostle
- February 14, 1835 – April 13, 1838
- Called by: Three Witnesses
- Reason: Initial organization of Quorum of the Twelve
- End reason: Excommunicated for apostasy
- Reorganization at end of term: No apostles immediately ordained

Personal details
- Born: Lyman Eugene Johnson; October 24, 1811; Pomfret, Vermont
- Died: December 20, 1859 (aged 48); Prairie du Chien, Wisconsin

Lyman Eugene Johnson (October 24, 1811 – December 20, 1859) was an early leader in the Latter Day Saint movement and an original member of the Quorum of the Twelve Apostles, along with his brother Luke Johnson. He broke with Joseph Smith and Sidney Rigdon during the 1837–38 period when schism divided the early church. Johnson later became a successful pioneer lawyer in Iowa and was one of the town fathers of Keokuk, Iowa.

Johnson was born in Pomfret, Windsor County, Vermont, to John Johnson, and Elsa Jacobs. The family moved to Hiram, Ohio, in 1818, where they established the John Johnson Farm, a successful 300-acre (1.2 km^{2}) farm.

Johnson died in 1859, drowning in the Mississippi River in a carriage accident at Prairie du Chien, Wisconsin. He had at least five children.

== Involvement in the Latter Day Saint movement ==
=== Early contact ===
Johnson was baptized into the Church of Christ by Sidney Rigdon in February 1831. Joseph Smith and Emma Hale Smith moved into the Johnson family home on September 12, 1831. Johnson was then ordained an elder on October 25, 1831 and a high priest of the church on November of that same year. In response to a revelation given on January 25, 1832, Johnson joined Orson Pratt on an evangelizing mission which took them through the eastern United States. The two were successful preachers and brought many converts to Mormonism on this and other missions.

=== Quorum of the Twelve ===
In the summer of 1834, Johnson marched with the Zion's Camp expedition which hoped to restore Latter Day Saints in Missouri to their lands in Jackson County. Although the expedition was a failure, many of the veterans of the expedition were soon called to high leadership positions in the church. Among these were Johnson and his brother Luke, who were among the original twelve men called on February 14, 1835, to be "Special Witnesses" or apostles in a "traveling high council" of the church, later known as the Council or Quorum of the Twelve. The chief duty of the apostles was to preside over missionary activities. Johnson continued to operate as a successful missionary from 1835 to 1837. On September 4, 1834, Johnson was married to Sarah Susan Long.

=== Bank failure ===
The failure of the Kirtland Safety Society, a bank founded by church leaders, led to widespread dissent in 1837. The church held a high council trial on September 3, 1837, which ejected Johnson, his brother Luke, and John F. Boynton from the Quorum of the Twelve. Boynton explained that his difficulties with the church resulted from "the failure of the bank" which he had understood "was instituted by the will and revelations of God, and he had been told that it would never fail". Despite these difficulties, Johnson and the others temporarily reconciled with church leaders and were restored to their apostleships on September 10, 1837, after which Johnson and his family moved to the Latter Day Saint settlement of Far West, Missouri.

=== Excommunications ===
Meanwhile, schismatic strife between the loyalist faction and the dissenting faction continued to divide the church in Kirtland. The strife spread to Missouri, but in Far West, the loyalists were able to keep control by excommunicating the leadership of the Missouri church—David Whitmer, John Whitmer, W. W. Phelps—along with Oliver Cowdery, Johnson, and others. In Johnson's case, a list of seven charges were presented to him by the Far West High Council on April 9, 1838, which included the charge of "saying he would appeal the suit between him & Brother Phineas Young and take it out of the County." Johnson replied on April 12 that "I should not condescend to put my constitutional rights at issue upon so disrespectful a point, as to answer any of those other charges until that is withdrawn & until then shall withdraw myself from your society and fellowship."

== Later life ==
After Lyman E. Johnson's excommunication from the church in 1838, he pursued a secular career, primarily focusing on law and business. He initially remained in Ohio for a period before relocating to Iowa and subsequently to Wisconsin. In Iowa, Johnson became one of the founding figures of Keokuk, along with his brother Luke, contributing to the town's early development. He established himself as a successful pioneer lawyer, gaining respect and recognition in the legal community.

On December 20, 1859, Johnson died in a sleighing accident near Prairie du Chien, Wisconsin. An obituary detailed the incident, stating, "He was in a sleigh with others, when it went through an air-hole in the ice, of the Mississippi." At the time of his death, he was 45 years old.

== Notes ==
Church of the Latter Day Saints titles Later renamed: Church of Jesus Christ of Latter Day Saints (1838)
Preceded by John F. Boynton	Quorum of the Twelve Apostles; February 14, 1835–April 12, 1838	Succeeded by John E. Page
