= Warren Parrish =

American LDS leader (1803–1877)

Reverend Warren F. Parrish
- Born: Warren F. Parrish; January 10, 1803; Mendon, New York, United States
- Died: January 3, 1877 (aged 73); Emporia, Kansas, United States
- Resting place: Maplewood Memorial Lawn Cemetery; 38.420°N 96.206°W
- Spouse: Martha H. Raymond

Warren Farr Parrish (January 10, 1803 – January 3, 1877) was a leader in the early Latter Day Saint movement. Parrish held a number of positions of responsibility, including that of scribe to church president Joseph Smith Jr. Parrish and other church leaders became disillusioned with Smith after the failure of the Kirtland Safety Society; left the Church of Jesus Christ of Latter Day Saints in 1837; and formed a short-lived church in Kirtland, Ohio, in 1838 which they called The Church of Christ, after the original name of the church organized by Smith. This church soon disintegrated as the result of disagreement between its leaders. By 1844, Parrish was working as a Baptist minister in the Fox River area of Wisconsin and Illinois.

== Activity in Latter Day Saint church ==
=== Marriage ===
Parrish married Elizabeth "Betsy" Patten (1797–1834). Their daughter Mary Parrish was born in Theresa, Jefferson County, New York in 1828.

Elizabeth was the younger sister of David W. Patten who became one of the original Latter Day Saint apostles in 1835.

=== Baptism by Brigham Young ===
Patten records that on "May 20, 1833, brother Brigham Young came to Theresa, Indian River Falls, where I had been bearing testimony to my relatives; and after preaching several discourses, he baptized my brothers Archibald and Ira Patten, Warren Parrish, Cheeseman, my mother, and my sister Polly."

=== Participation in Zion's Camp ===
In 1834, Joseph Smith said he received a revelation from God, calling for a militia to be raised in Kirtland which would then march to Missouri and "redeem Zion." Parrish volunteered to join a group of about 200 men to form the militia, which became known as "Zion's Camp". Parrish and his wife Elizabeth left Kirtland with Zion’s Camp on May 4, 1834.

Parrish's wife Elizabeth died from cholera at Rush Creek, Clay County, Missouri on June 27, 1834.

=== Mission to Missouri ===
In September 1834, Parrish and Patten traveled throughout upper Missouri together "to preach the Gospel". Patten reports that "we baptized twenty, during which time several instances of the healing power of God were made manifest."

=== Attempts at translation ===
In 1835, Parrish became a member of the First Quorum of Seventy; became scribe to Joseph Smith Jr; and built his home in Kirtland.

Joseph Smith recorded in his journal on November 14, 1835 that Parrish had been promised the ability to "know of hidden things" and be "endowed with a knowledge of hidden languages". During the fall of 1835, Parrish, along with Oliver Cowdery, William W. Phelps and Frederick G. Williams, recorded the translation from the Joseph Smith Book of Abraham papyri as Joseph Smith dictated it. Parrish and Phelps under the direction of Smith also produced a set of documents called the "Grammar & A[l]phabet of the Egyptian Language" that accompanied the dictated translation.

=== Remarriage ===
On December 3, 1835, Parrish married Martha Hadley Raymond (1804–1875) in Kirtland, Geauga County, Ohio. Joseph Smith performed the ceremony. Their daughter Martha Parrish (1837–1900) was born in Kirtland on August 6, 1837.

=== Preaching in Tennessee ===
In May 1836, Parrish traveled from Kirtland to Tennessee to join Patten and Wilford Woodruff. According to Woodruff, they traveled through Kentucky and Tennessee "preaching the word of God, healing the sick, and the Spirit of God was with us and attended our ministrations." During this time, Parrish, Woodruff and Patten were arrested by a local sheriff at the urging of Matthew Williams, a Methodist minister, who claimed that they were making false prophecies. The group was accused of preaching "that Christ would come the second time before this generation passed away" and that "four individuals should received the Holy Ghost within twenty-four hours." A mock trial was held in which they were not allowed to speak, at the end of which they were pronounced guilty. They were later released unharmed on the condition that they pay court costs and leave the area within ten days.

== Dissent and conflict with Smith ==
=== Failure of the Kirtland Safety Society ===
In 1836, Joseph Smith organized the Kirtland Safety Society Antibanking Company, a joint-stock company with note issuing powers. Parrish later became the company's treasurer. Smith encouraged church members to invest in the Kirtland Safety Society. By 1837, the "bank" had failed, which according to the Mormon leader George A. Smith was partly as the result of Parrish and other bank officers stealing funds. Parrish's alleged role in this was cited in his excommunication from the church. From this time forward, Parrish sought to destroy Joseph Smith and the church, and as a result Smith was forced to leave Kirtland. Soon after Smith and Sidney Rigdon left on July 26, 1837, a crisis formed within the church at Kirtland during their absence.

=== Armed confrontation in the Kirtland Temple ===
In addition to Parrish, the failure of the bank caused a major rift among some other church leaders as well, who concluded that Smith could not be a true prophet if he could not foresee that the "bank" would be unsuccessful.

Parrish and those supporting him soon claimed ownership of the Kirtland Temple. Eliza R. Snow relates that Parrish and a group of others came into the temple during Sunday services "armed with pistols and bowie-knives and seated themselves together in the Aaronic pulpits, on the east end of the temple, while father Smith [Joseph Smith, Sr.] and others, as usual, occupied those of the Melchizedek priesthood on the west." Parrish's group interrupted the services and, according to Snow "a fearful scene ensued—the apostate speaker becoming so clamorous that Father Smith called for the police to take that man out of the house, when Parrish, John Boynton, and others, drew their pistols and bowie-knives, and rushed down from the stand into the congregation; John Boynton saying he would blow out the brains of the first man who dared to lay hands on him." Police arrived and ejected the troublemakers, after which the services continued.

=== Public statements ===
Parrish wrote letters to several newspapers expressing his anger with church leaders, referring to them as "infidels". In one such letter, Parrish claims that "Martin Harris, one of the subscribing witnesses; has come out at last, and says he never saw the plates, from which the book purports to have been translated, except in vision; and he further says that any man who says he has seen them in any other way is a liar, Joseph not excepted; – see new edition, Book of Covenants, page 170, which agrees with Harris's testimony." Wilford Woodruff recorded his reaction to some of Parrish's writings in his journal entry of April 4, 1838, stating that they were "full of slander and falsehoods against Joseph Smith Jr."

=== Parrish's Church of Christ ===
Parrish eventually led a group of dissenters that formed a new church based in Kirtland, which they called the Church of Christ, after the original name of the church organized by Joseph Smith. George A. Smith wrote that the group intended "to renounce the Book of Mormon and Joseph Smith, and take the 'Mormon' doctrines to overthrow all the religions in the world, and unite all the Christian churches in one general band, and they to be its great leaders." Among those who associated themselves with this church was Martin Harris. Parrish's group believed that Joseph Smith had become a fallen prophet. By the beginning of 1838, Parrish's church had taken control of the Kirtland Temple as Smith and those loyal to him left Kirtland to gather in Far West, Missouri.

A debate arose among Parrish's group regarding the validity of the Book of Mormon and the existing revelations, with Parrish, John F. Boynton, Luke S. Johnson, and several others claiming that it was all nonsense. George A. Smith reported: "One of them told me that Moses was a rascal and the Prophets were tyrants, and that Jesus Christ was a despot, Paul a base liar and all religion a fudge. And Parrish said he agreed with him in principle." This resulted in a permanent division between Parrish's supporters and other leaders, including Martin Harris, who cautioned them not to reject the book. Cyrus Smalling, Joseph Coe and several others "declared [Harris's] testimony was true." Parrish's church dissolved soon after this division.

=== Later life ===
In 1840, Parrish and his family were living in Chardon, Geauga County, Ohio.

In 1844, Parrish was working as a Baptist minister in the Fox River area of Wisconsin and Illinois for a salary of $500 per year.

In 1850, Parrish, wife Martha, daughter Mary (22 years old) and daughter Martha (13 years old) were living in Mendon, New York; and he was working as a clergyman.

In 1855, Parrish and his family were living in Rockford, Winnebago County, Illinois.

In 1860, Parrish, his wife Martha and his daughter Martha (22 years old) were living in Rockford. On June 15, 1860, Parrish was excluded from the Baptist church.

In 1870, Parrish and his wife Martha were living in Emporia, Lyon County, Kansas.

On July 14, 1875, Parrish's wife Martha died in Emporia and was soon buried in the Maplewood Memorial Lawn Cemetery in Emporia.

On January 3, 1877, Parrish died in Emporia and was soon buried in the Maplewood Memorial Lawn Cemetery in Emporia.
