= Hosanna shout =

Latter Day Saint movement ritual

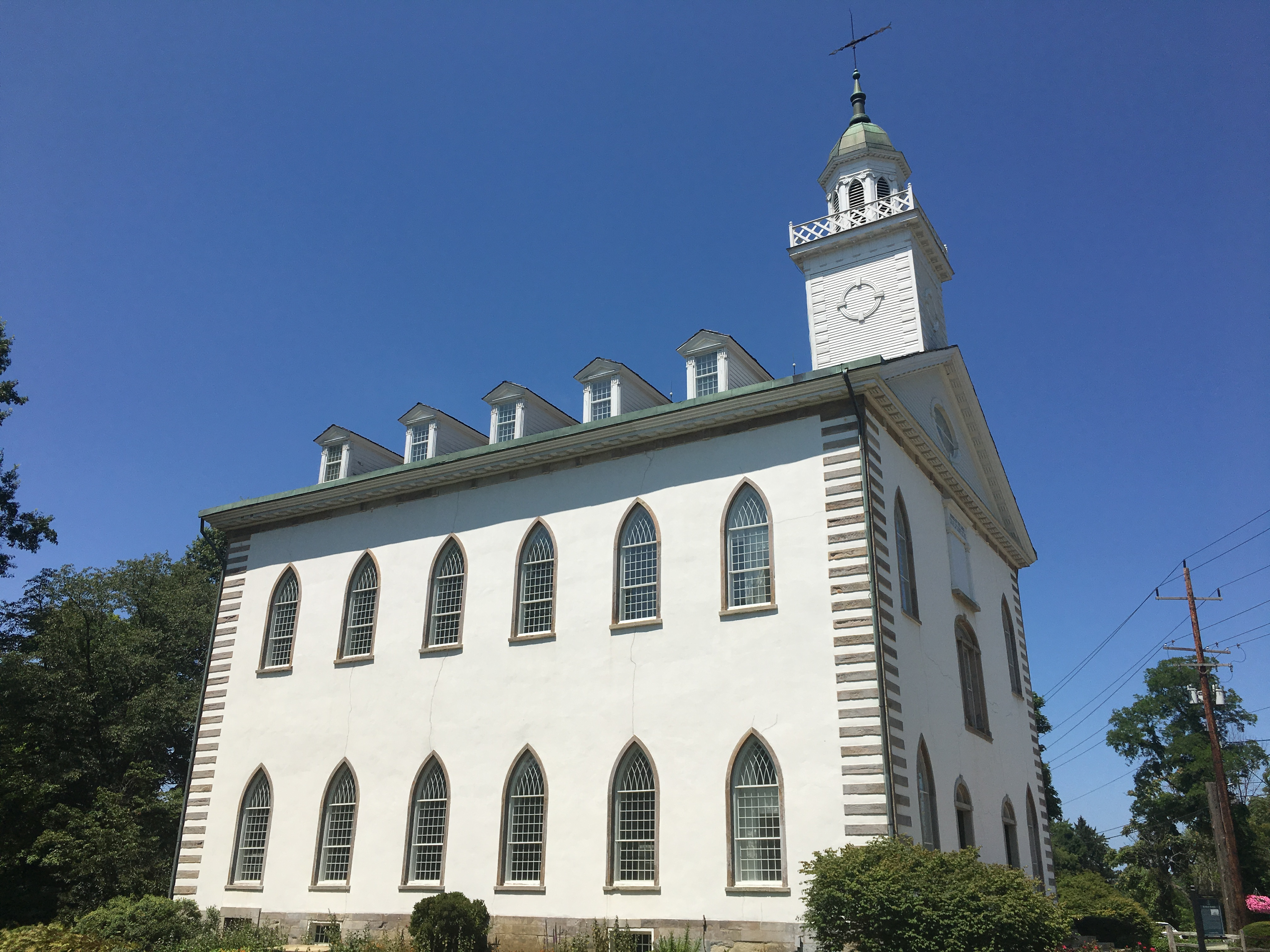
The Kirtland Temple in Kirtland, Ohio

In the Latter Day Saint movement, a hosanna shout is an organized ritual of a congregation shouting "hosanna". It was first performed as a ritual in the dedication of the Kirtland Temple, and was a part of the Kirtland endowment ceremony. It continues to be practiced by some Latter Day Saint denominations, most notably the Church of Jesus Christ of Latter-day Saints (LDS Church), which practices the ritual at the dedication of each of its temples and other important buildings.

The Encyclopedia of Mormonism states:

When the ordinance of the washing of feet was introduced at Kirtland, shouts of hosanna were viewed as a sealing benediction on both private and quorum prayer and then on the dedicatory prayer. At prayer meetings in the Kirtland Temple, the Saints sometimes used related phrases such as "Blessed is the name of the Most High God" and "Glory to God in the highest" (HC 2:386).

The Hosanna Shout is whole-souled, given to the full limit of one's strength. The congregation stands and in unison shouts the words "Hosanna, Hosanna, Hosanna to God and the Lamb. Amen, Amen, and Amen," repeating them three times. This is usually accompanied by the rhythmic waving of white handkerchiefs with uplifted hands. The epithet "Lamb" relates to the condescension and Atonement of Jesus Christ.

The Hosanna Shout memorializes the pre-earthly Council in Heaven, as "when … all the sons of God shouted for joy" (Job 38:7). It also recalls the hosannas and the waving of palm branches accorded the Messiah as he entered Jerusalem. And hosannas welcomed him as he appeared to the Nephites. [LDS Church] President Lorenzo Snow taught that this shout will herald the Messiah when he comes in the glory of the Father (cf. 1 Thes. 4:16).

The worldwide membership of the LDS Church participated in a hosanna shout, led by church president Gordon B. Hinckley, when the Conference Center was dedicated on October 8, 2000.

On April 5, 2020, which was also Palm Sunday, church president Russell M. Nelson led a church-wide hosanna shout as part of the Sunday morning session of general conference. This occurrence coincided with the bicentennial year of the theophany which church founder, Joseph Smith, said he experienced, known as the First Vision.

== See also ==
- Hosanna Anthem
- Sukkot: Hoshanot
- Four Species: The waving ceremony
- Hoshanah Rabbah: Seven hoshanot
- Palm Sunday
