= Historic Kirtland Village =

Place in Ohio, United States

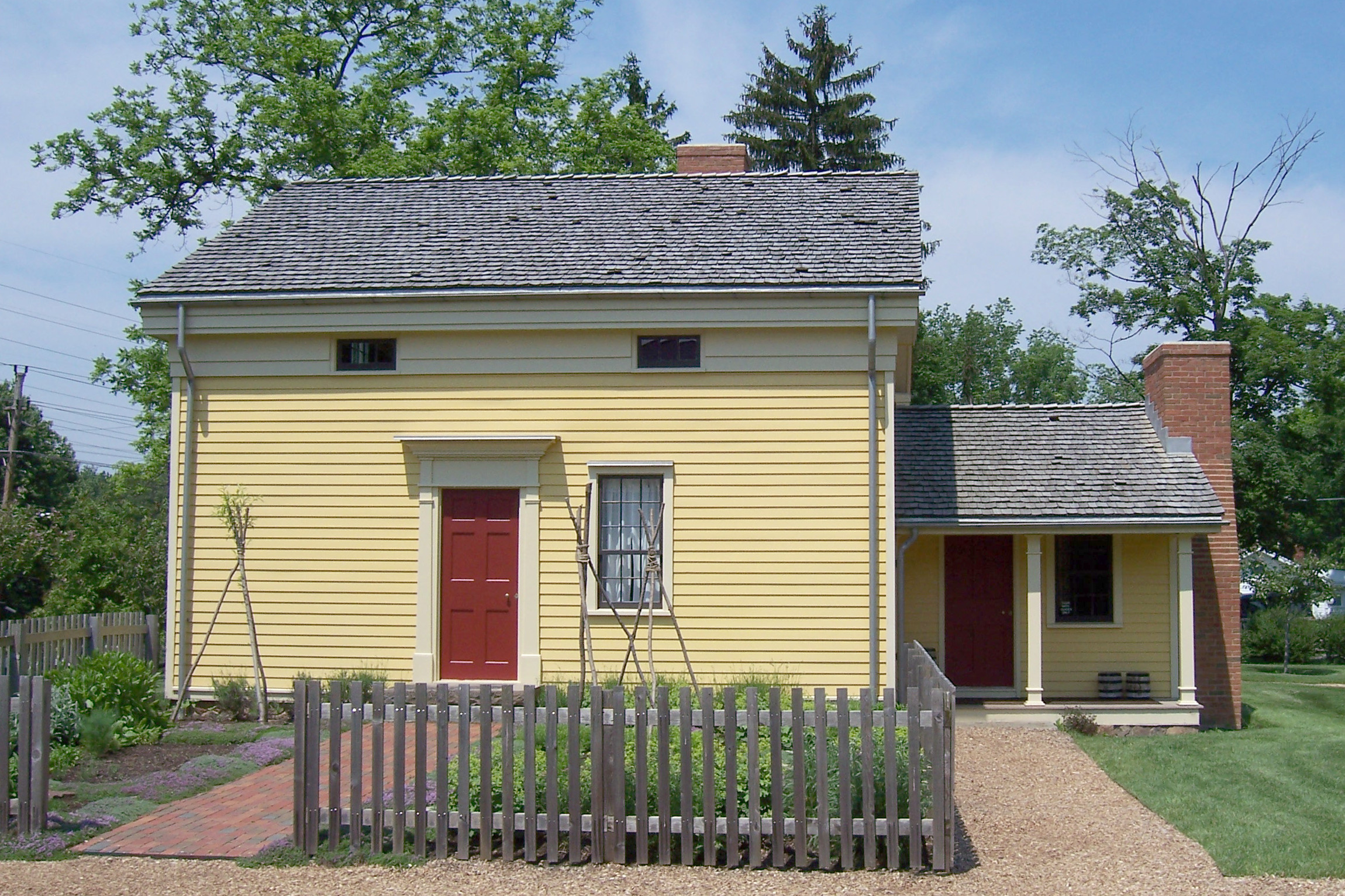
- Newel K. Whitney Home

- Site location within Ohio, USA
- 41.629185°N 81.361678°W
- Location: Kirtland Flats, Kirtland, Lake County, Ohio, United States

History
- Years of significance: 1831–1838

Site notes
- Restored: 2000–2003, 2022–2023
- Governing body: The Church of Jesus Christ of Latter-day Saints

Historic Kirtland Village is a historic district in Kirtland, Ohio, United States. It is owned and operated by the Church of Jesus Christ of Latter-day Saints (LDS Church). The district is made up of buildings and sites important to the early Latter Day Saint movement. Some of the buildings are original and have been restored to their 1830s appearances, while others were rebuilt on or near their original sites. In addition to Historic Kirtland, the LDS church also owns and operates the nearby Kirtland Temple, the Isaac Morley Farm just east of Kirtland in Kirtland Hills, and the John Johnson Farm in Hiram.

== History ==
The LDS Church purchased the first property in the village, the Newel K. Whitney Store, in the late 1970s, and restored it in 1984. In the years since then, the LDS Church acquired more historic buildings and property in the area. In April 2000, plans were announced to restore the remaining buildings, while reconstructing others, building a new visitors center, and rerouting some of the surrounding streets to create a pedestrian-friendly village. Following the completion of the project, LDS Church president Gordon B. Hinckley dedicated the site on May 18, 2003.

In 2018, Historic Kirtland Village exhibited nearly 600 nativity displays from around the world as part of an annual Christmas tradition in its 10th year.

The most recent addition to the village is the Joseph and Emma Smith home, located one block north of the Kirtland Temple. The home, purchased by the church in 2012, was dedicated by David A. Bednar on August 26, 2023, following the completion of a restoration project that began in May 2022 to return the house to its 1830s appearance.

== List of buildings ==
- Visitors' Center
- Newel K. Whitney Store (restored)
- Newel K. Whitney Home (restored)
- Joseph Smith Home (restored)
- John Johnson Inn (rebuilt)
- Schoolhouse (rebuilt)
- Sawmill (rebuilt): Some of the original foundation stones were used in the reconstruction of the sawmill.
- Ashery (rebuilt): Located a hundred yards from the Newel K. Whitney Store and historically a major source of revenue.

== See also ==
- Mormon Historic Sites Foundation
