= Ashery =

Factory producing lye from wood ash

An ashery is a factory that converts hardwood ashes into lye, potash, or pearlash. Asheries were common in newly settled areas of North America during the late 18th century and much of the 19th century, when excess wood was available as settlers cleared their land for farming. Hardwood ashes contain abundant levels of potassium carbonate and potassium hydroxide, the principal components of the products being produced.

Lye was produced by soaking ashes in hot water, filtering out the ashes, and repeating with fresh ashes as necessary to obtain the desired alkalinity in the resulting liquid. This liquid, commonly called lye could then be mixed with fats to produce soft soap, or it could be evaporated (often by boiling) to produce pot ash or black salts which still contained dark carbon impurities. The potash could then be baked in a kiln to further refine the substance into a pearly white material called pearl ash, pearl-ash or pearlash.

The lye and potash stages were commonly performed on site by the settlers themselves, and the asheries only performed the final and most difficult step of converting the black salts to pearlash.

The product was often shipped to Great Britain where it was used in the production of glass and ceramic wares.

The ashery at Historic Kirtland Village is thought to be the only example of a reconstructed ashery in North America.
