= John Johnson (Latter Day Saints) =

Leader in the Latter Day Saint movement in Ohio (1778–1843)

John Johnson Sr. (April 11, 1778 – July 30, 1843) was an early leader in the Latter Day Saint movement in Ohio.

== Early life and family ==
Johnson was born in Chesterfield, New Hampshire. He became a farmer and farmed near Pomfret, Vermont. In 1818, he moved to Hiram, Ohio, where he purchased land and became a prominent member of the Methodist Church. He married Mary Elsa (Alice) Jacobs in 1800 and they were the parents of 15 children: Alice (Elsa), Robert, Fanny, John Jr., Luke, Olmstead, Lyman, Emily, Marinda (married Orson Hyde), Mary, Justin, Edwin, Charlotte, Albert, and Joseph.

== Conversion to Mormonism ==
Elsa Johnson, wife of John Johnson

In early 1831, Johnson's sons Luke and Lyman were baptized into the Church of Christ, which had been founded by Joseph Smith the previous year. After their sons were baptized, Johnson and his wife travelled with Methodist preacher Ezra Booth to Kirtland, Ohio, to learn more about the church. While in Kirtland, Johnson's wife reported that she experienced a miraculous healing at the hands of Smith:

"Elsa Johnson had been afflicted for many years with a rheumatic arm. She experienced so much pain and difficulty in movement that for two years she hadn’t been able to raise her hand to her head. As the Johnsons and others from the Hiram area visited with Joseph Smith in the Newel K. Whitney home, they discussed the gifts of the Spirit as held in the early Church. Someone asked whether God had given power to men today to heal people like Elsa Johnson. After the conversation had turned to another subject, the Prophet [Smith] walked up to Elsa and said, 'Woman, in the name of the Lord Jesus Christ I command thee to be whole,' and then he walked out of the room. Elsa was instantly healed, and the next day she did her washing 'without difficulty or pain.'"

As a result, Johnson, his wife, and Booth were converted to Mormonism and became members of the Church of Christ. Johnson was baptized by Smith. Johnson invited Smith and his wife and children to live at the Johnson farm, which served as the headquarters of the church from September 1831 to March 1832. While living at the farm, Smith recorded a number of revelations which are included in the Doctrine and Covenants and continued his translation of the Bible.

== Church leadership ==
In 1833, Johnson and his wife moved to Kirtland where they opened an inn next to the store owned by Newel K. Whitney. Johnson was ordained as an elder in the church on February 17, 1833, and as a high priest on June 4, 1833. On February 17, 1834, Johnson was appointed as one of the founding members of the church's first high council in Kirtland. In 1835, Johnson's sons Luke and Lyman were selected as two of founding members of the Quorum of the Twelve.

While in Kirtland, Johnson assisted with the building of the Kirtland Temple and allowed his inn to be used for the display of a number of Egyptian mummies that Smith had purchased. Smith used scrolls that accompanied the mummies to produce the Book of Abraham.

== Disaffection from Mormonism ==
Johnson was a charter member of Smith's Kirtland Safety Society, which failed in the mid-1830s. In 1836 and 1837, Johnson was sued a number of times for non-payment of debts. In the midst of these difficulties, Johnson's presence on the high council was objected to on September 3, 1837, and he was dropped from the body. Some sources report that he was excommunicated from the church. A more recent work indicates that the official position of the Church of Jesus Christ of Latter-day Saints is that Johnson did not lose his membership.

== Death ==
Johnson remained in Kirtland when the Latter Day Saints moved on to Missouri. He died in Kirtland and is buried in the Kirtland Cemetery across the street from the Kirtland Temple.
