= Luke Johnson (Mormon) =

American religious leader (1807–1861)

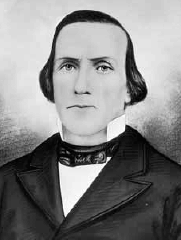

Quorum of the Twelve Apostles
- February 15, 1835 – September 3, 1837
- Called by: Three Witnesses
- End reason: Disfellowshipped and removed from Quorum

Latter Day Saint Apostle
- February 15, 1835 – December 31, 1837
- Called by: Three Witnesses
- Reason: Initial organization of Quorum of the Twelve
- End reason: Resignation from the church
- Reorganization at end of term: No apostles immediately ordained

Personal details
- Born: Luke Johnson; November 3, 1807; Pomfret, Vermont, United States
- Died: December 9, 1861 (aged 54); Salt Lake City, Utah Territory, United States
- Resting place: Salt Lake City Cemetery; 40°46′37.92″N 111°51′28.8″W

Luke Johnson (November 3, 1807 – December 9, 1861) was a leader in the Latter Day Saint movement and an original member of the Quorum of the Twelve Apostles from 1835 to 1838. He served in the Quorum with his younger brother, Lyman E. Johnson, and Orson Hyde, his brother-in-law.

Johnson was born November 3, 1807, in Pomfret, Vermont, a son of John Johnson and Elsa Jacobs. He wrote of his family in an autobiographical sketch:

My grandfather, Israel Johnson lived in Chesterfield, New Hampshire, and was much respected by his neighbors for his honesty, integrity and industry. My father, John Johnson, was born in Chesterfield, New Hampshire, April 11, 1779. He followed the occupation of farming on a large scale, and was noted for paying his debts and living independently. He moved from Pomfret, Vermont, to Hiram, Portage county, Ohio. He was connected with the Methodist church for about five years previous to receiving the Gospel. My father was satisfied in regard to the truth of "Mormonism" and was baptized by Joseph Smith, Jun., in the winter of 1830–31, and furnished him and his family a home, while he translated a portion of the Bible.

Johnson was an educator and a physician. He married Susan H. Poteet on November 1, 1833. This marriage produced six children: Elisa Mary, Fanny, Eliza, Vashtia, James, and Solomon. After Susan's death on September 20, 1846, he married America Morgan Clark on March 3, 1847, in Council Bluffs, Iowa, and had additional children. This family included Susan Marinda, Orson Albert, Mark Anthony, Charlotte Elizabeth, Lovinia Ann, Phebe W. and Luke.

== Church membership and service ==
Johnson was baptized into the Church of Christ on May 10, 1831, by Joseph Smith. By October 1831, he had been ordained an elder and went on a mission to southern Ohio with Robert Rathburn. Later in 1831, he joined Sidney Rigdon in preaching the gospel in areas of Pennsylvania and Ohio. Their efforts brought about fifty new members into the young church, including Rigdon's mother and other members of the Rigdon family. At one point, while he was praying, he had a vision of both the Angel Moroni and the golden plates.

Johnson was ordained to the office of high priest by Smith on October 25, 1831. With Seymour Brunson and Hazen Aldrich, he served as a missionary in Ohio, Virginia, and Kentucky in 1832 and 1833, baptizing more than a hundred people on their journey. He was a member of the Kirtland high council which was formed on February 17, 1834. On June 26, 1834, Johnson marched with Zion's Camp, suffering with cholera on the journey. At age 27, Johnson was chosen and ordained one of the original members of the Quorum of Twelve Apostles on February 15, 1835. Shortly after the quorum was formed, the new apostles were sent on missions. Johnson served in the Eastern United States, New York and Upper Canada. He returned to Kirtland, Ohio, in late 1836. There, he attended Hebrew school and the Kirtland Temple.

Johnson defended Smith from criticism on several occasions. But, in 1837, he became alienated from Smith, in part because of financial losses suffered in the failure of the Kirtland Safety Society. He was disfellowshipped at Kirtland on September 3, 1837. Johnson was later received back into fellowship for a short time, but in December 1837, he denounced Smith and resigned from the church. After leaving the church, Johnson moved to Cabell County, Virginia, where he taught at Marshall Academy and then studied medicine, ultimately setting up a medical practice in Kirtland. The church excommunicated Johnson in 1838 on charges of apostasy.

In 1846, after the death of Smith, Johnson requested permission to address an assembly of the saints in Nauvoo, Illinois. He said: "I have stopped by the wayside and stood aloof from the work of the Lord .... But my heart is with this people. I want to be associated with the saints, go with them into the wilderness and continue with them to the end." Johnson's brother-in-law, Orson Hyde, rebaptized him into the Church of Jesus Christ of Latter-day Saints on March 8, 1846. However, he never again served in the higher councils of the church.

Johnson traveled with Brigham Young and Wilford Woodruff to the Salt Lake Valley, serving as a captain of ten, as part of the first group of 143 Mormon pioneers in July 1847. He also served as a Captain of Fifty in the Daniel A. Miller/John W. Cooley Company (1853), while traveling with members of his family. Johnson settled in St. John, Tooele County, Utah, where he served as bishop of a local LDS congregation. He is the only man in the church's history who served as a bishop after being a member of the Quorum of the Twelve Apostles. He died December 9, 1861, in the home of Orson Hyde in Salt Lake City and was buried at Salt Lake City Cemetery.

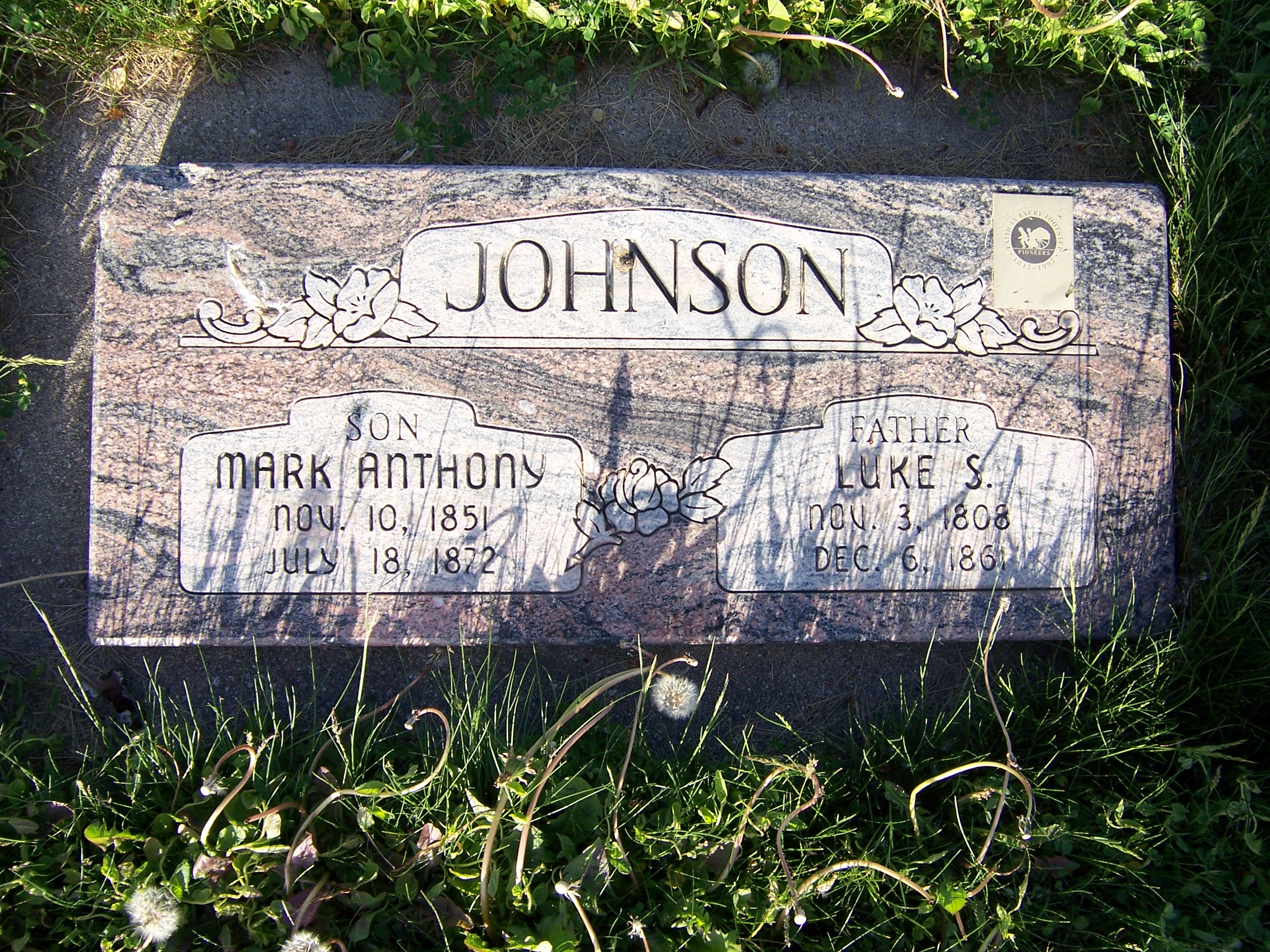
Grave marker of Luke Johnson.

== See also ==
Church of the Latter Day Saints titles
Preceded by Parley P. Pratt	Quorum of the Twelve Apostles; February 15, 1835–3 September 1837	Succeeded by William Smith
