= Columbus Ohio Temple =

Temple of the Church of Jesus Christ of Latter-day Saints in Ohio, US

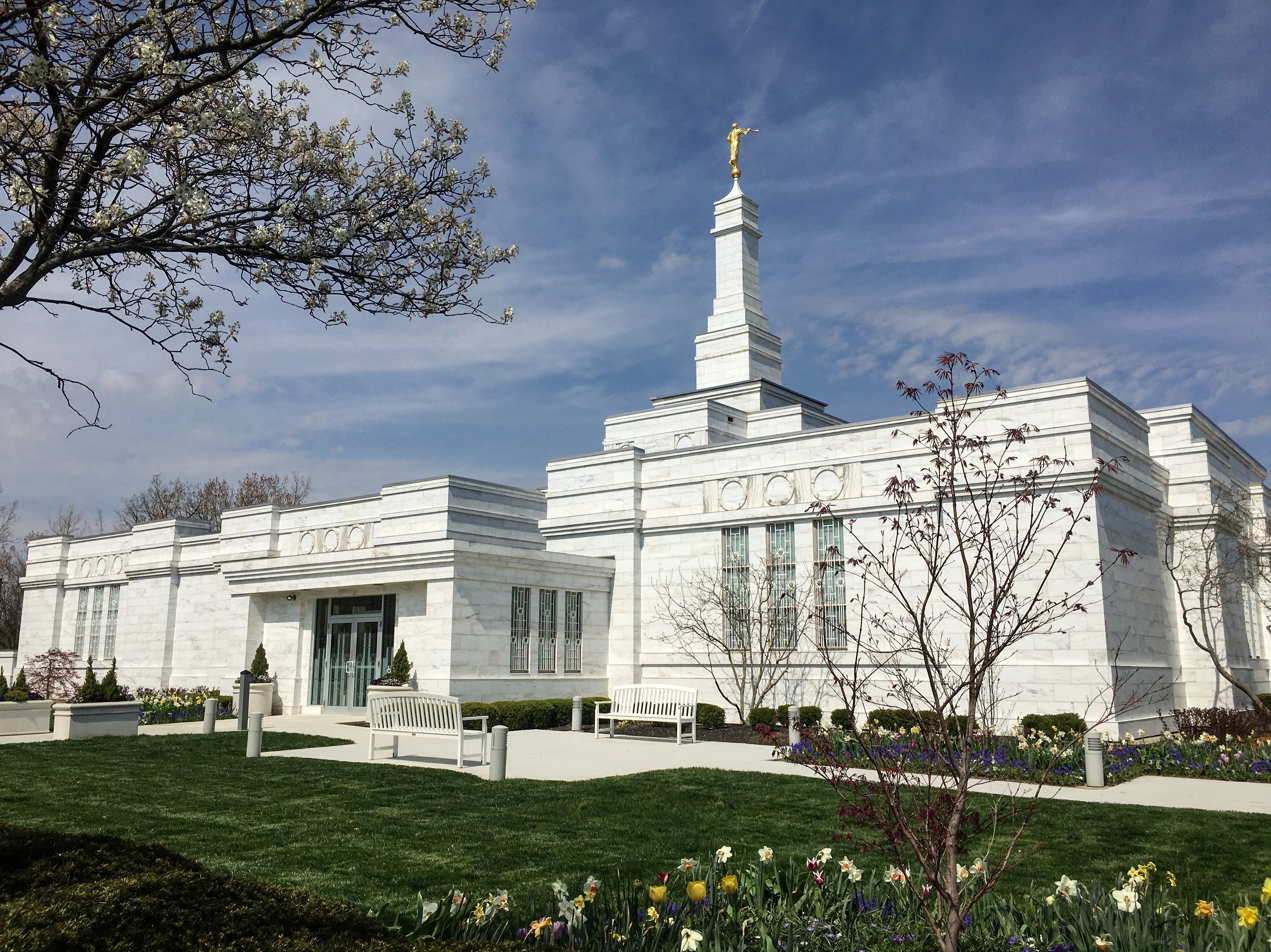
- April 2017
- Interactive map of Columbus Ohio Temple
- Number: 60
- Dedication: September 4, 1999, by Gordon B. Hinckley
- Site: 5 acres (2.0 ha)
- Floor area: 11,745 ft^{2} (1,091.1 m^{2})
- Height: 71 ft (22 m)
- Official website • News & images

Church chronology
← Spokane Washington Temple	Columbus Ohio Temple	→ Bismarck North Dakota Temple

Additional information
- Announced: April 25, 1998, by Gordon B. Hinckley
- Groundbreaking: September 12, 1998, by John K. Carmack
- Open house: August 21–28, 1999; April 29 – May 13, 2023
- Rededicated: June 4, 2023, by M. Russell Ballard
- Current president: George E. Mitchell
- Designed by: Firestone J. Mullin
- Location: Columbus, Ohio, United States
- Coordinates: 39°59′38.72040″N 83°6′47.57039″W
- Exterior finish: Imperial Danby White variegated marble quarried from Vermont
- Design: Classic modern, single-spire design
- Baptistries: 1
- Ordinance rooms: 2 (two-stage progressive)
- Sealing rooms: 2

The Columbus Ohio Temple is the 60th operating temple of the Church of Jesus Christ of Latter-day Saints (LDS Church), and is located in Columbus, Ohio. Announced by church president Gordon B. Hinckley on April 25, 1998, it was part of a broader initiative to construct smaller temples closer to church members worldwide. A groundbreaking ceremony occurred on September 12, 1998, led by general authority John K. Carmack, and was dedicated by Hinckley on September 4–5, 1999.

Located on a 5 acres (2.0 ha) site, the temple has a single-spire design using white marble quarried from Spain, with a statue of the angel Moroni on the spire. The 11,745 square feet (1,091.1 m^{2}) structure includes two ordinance rooms, two sealing rooms, and a baptistry. The temple’s interior is of a Regency style.

In 2020, the temple underwent extensive renovations to update its mechanical systems, enhance energy efficiency, and improve accessibility. The renovations also introduced larger windows to allow more natural light and incorporated additional art glass. Following the renovations, a public open house was held from April 29 to May 13, 2023, and the temple was rededicated on June 4, 2023, by M. Russell Ballard, acting president of the Quorum of the Twelve Apostles.

The temple serves Latter-day Saints across north and central Ohio, western West Virginia, and Kentucky.

== History ==
The temple was announced by LDS Church president Gordon B. Hinckley on April 25, 1998, during a member meeting in Columbus, Ohio, and was part of a broader initiative to build smaller temples closer to church members around the world. The temple would be constructed on a 5-acre (2.0 ha) property located at 3870 Gateway Boulevard in Columbus. Preliminary plans called for a one-story structure of 10,700 square feet (990 m^{2}).

A groundbreaking ceremony took place on September 12, 1998, marking the commencement of construction. John K. Carmack, a member of the Seventy and then-president of the church's North America East Area, presided and it was attended by local church members and community leaders. There were several adjustments made during construction, including incorporating a patron waiting area for members traveling long distances to get to the temple, allowing patrons to eat and change. This was one of the first temples to do so, and this feature was added to later temple designs, beginning with the Spokane Washington Temple. When construction was completed, a public open house was held from August 19 to August 28, 1999, with approximately 30,000 people touring the building, including Ohio governor Bob Taft. The temple was dedicated on September 4–5, 1999, by Gordon B. Hinckley, in six sessions, with about 11,000 members from the 10 stakes in the temple district attending.

In February 2013, a shooting took place in the temple's parking lot in which two people were injured. According to a church spokesperson, the shooting was unrelated to the temple.

In March 2020, like all the church's others, the Columbus Ohio Temple was closed for a time in response to the COVID-19 pandemic. Later that month, the LDS Church announced that the temple would close for renovation on August 15, 2020, and was anticipated to reopen in late 2022. A public open house for the renovated temple was held from April 29 to May 13, 2023, excluding Sundays, and was rededicated on June 4, 2023, by M. Russell Ballard, Acting President of the Quorum of the Twelve Apostles.

== Design and architecture ==
Located on a 5-acre plot at 3870 Gateway Boulevard in Columbus, the temple is in a wooded area adjacent to a church meetinghouse. Landscaping uses native plants such as Eastern redbud, Red Sunset maple, magnolias, junipers, and boxwoods. During the 2020–2023 renovation, walkways and larger plaza areas were added to better accommodate large groups and enhance the temple's serene environment.

The single-story structure is 77 feet tall, including the multilevel spire with the angel Moroni at the top, and has a square base and two windows on each side as it rises above the center of the building. The exterior uses white marble quarried in Spain. Renovations completed in 2023 included climate control upgrades for energy efficiency and larger windows to allow more natural light and the inclusion of additional art glass.

The structure is 11,745 square feet and includes two ordinance rooms and two sealing rooms. The interior has a magnolia blossom motif, symbolizing purity, which appears in both exterior and interior design elements. Flooring materials include beige and gold Turkish stone, with additional stone accents obtained from Pakistan. The interior is done in a regency era style, and decorative painting covers the walls and ceilings to match that style.

Symbolic elements are used throughout the temple's design. The baptismal font rests on the backs of twelve oxen, representing the twelve tribes of Israel and the strength upon which God’s work rests. Art and carvings are made with attention to detail to represent faith in Jesus Christ.

== Renovations ==
The Columbus Ohio Temple is one of nearly 40 that use the small temple plan. After Hinckley initially addressed plans for smaller temples in 1997, this was the first of thirteen announced in 1998 using this approach. It was the second such temple completed, and one of nine smaller temples dedicated in 1999, of 13 dedicated that year. The angel Moroni statue was originally used on the Monticello Utah Temple and was white instead of the traditional gold. In Monticello, the white proved difficult to see on cloudy days, so the statue there was replaced with a slightly larger gold leaf statue, while the white fiberglass statue was covered in gold leaf and sent to Columbus.

A renovation project commenced in 2020 provided a comprehensive update of its interior and exterior features. Those in charge of the renovation were HKS Architects and then contracted by Westland Construction. The renovations focused on several key areas, including cleaning of art glass, acoustic improvements, and improvements to energy efficiency. The exterior received climate-control enhancements, and larger windows were installed to allow more natural light and accommodate additional art glass. One of the most prominent aspects of the renovation was the expansion of walkways and plaza areas to better accommodate large gatherings of members and visitors.

== Cultural and community impact ==
When the temple was originally opened to the public in 1999, more than 30,000 visitors toured the building during its open house period, including Ohio Governor Bob Taft. A similar experience occurred after the renovations completed in 2023, where thousands of guests visited during a multi-week open house.

During the open house in 2023, Ohio Governor Mike DeWine made his first tour of a church temple. He expressed gratitude for the tour and the explanation of the various rooms, along with the emphasis on families, stating that the temple is “a very, very peaceful place”. Ohio Secretary of State Frank LaRose gave a certificate of commendation for a commitment to excellence, earning “the respect and appreciation of (their) community”, which was received during the open house by Allen D. Haynie, a church general authority.

== Temple presidents and admittance ==
The church's temples are directed by a temple president and matron, each typically serving for a term of three years. The president and matron oversee the administration of temple operations and provide guidance and training for both temple patrons and staff.

Serving from 1999 to 2004, the first president was Jerry N. Martin, with Norma J. Martin serving as matron. As of 2025, George E. Mitchell is the president, with Debra Mitchell being the matron.

Like all the church's temples, it is not used for Sunday worship services. To members of the church, temples are regarded as sacred houses of the Lord. Once dedicated, only church members with a current temple recommend can enter for worship.

== See also ==
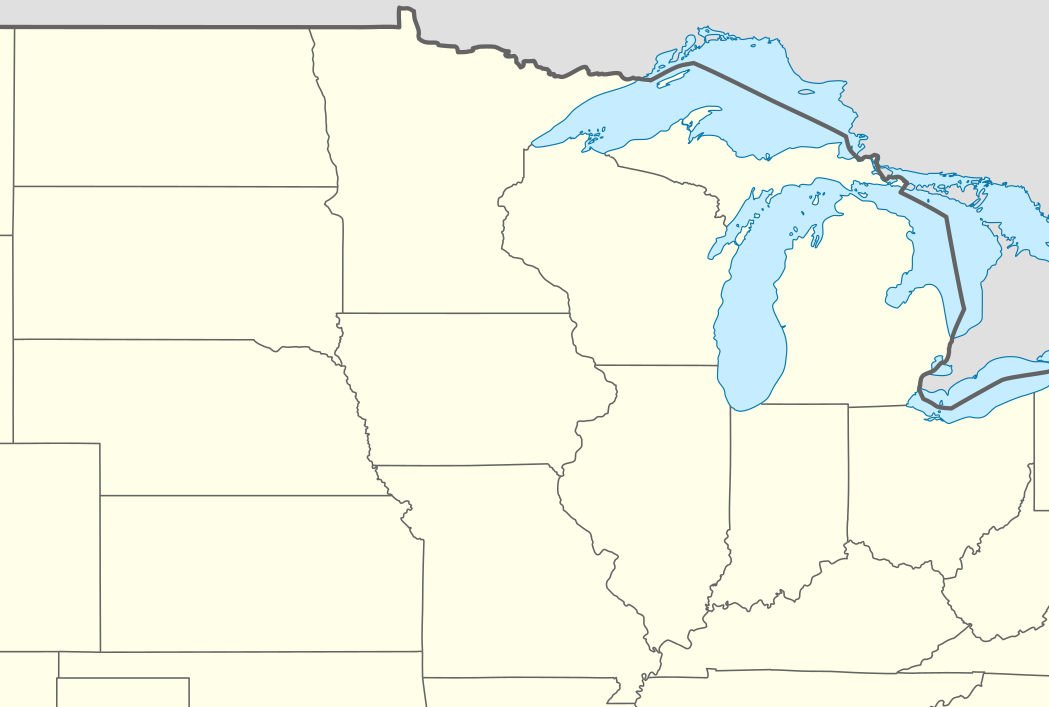
Temples in the United States Midwest
- = Operating
- = Under construction
- = Announced
- = Closed for renovation
- Comparison of temples of The Church of Jesus Christ of Latter-day Saints
- List of temples of The Church of Jesus Christ of Latter-day Saints
- List of temples of The Church of Jesus Christ of Latter-day Saints by geographic region
- Temple architecture (Latter-day Saints)
- The Church of Jesus Christ of Latter-day Saints in Ohio
