= John Johnson Farm =

- U.S. National Register of Historic Places
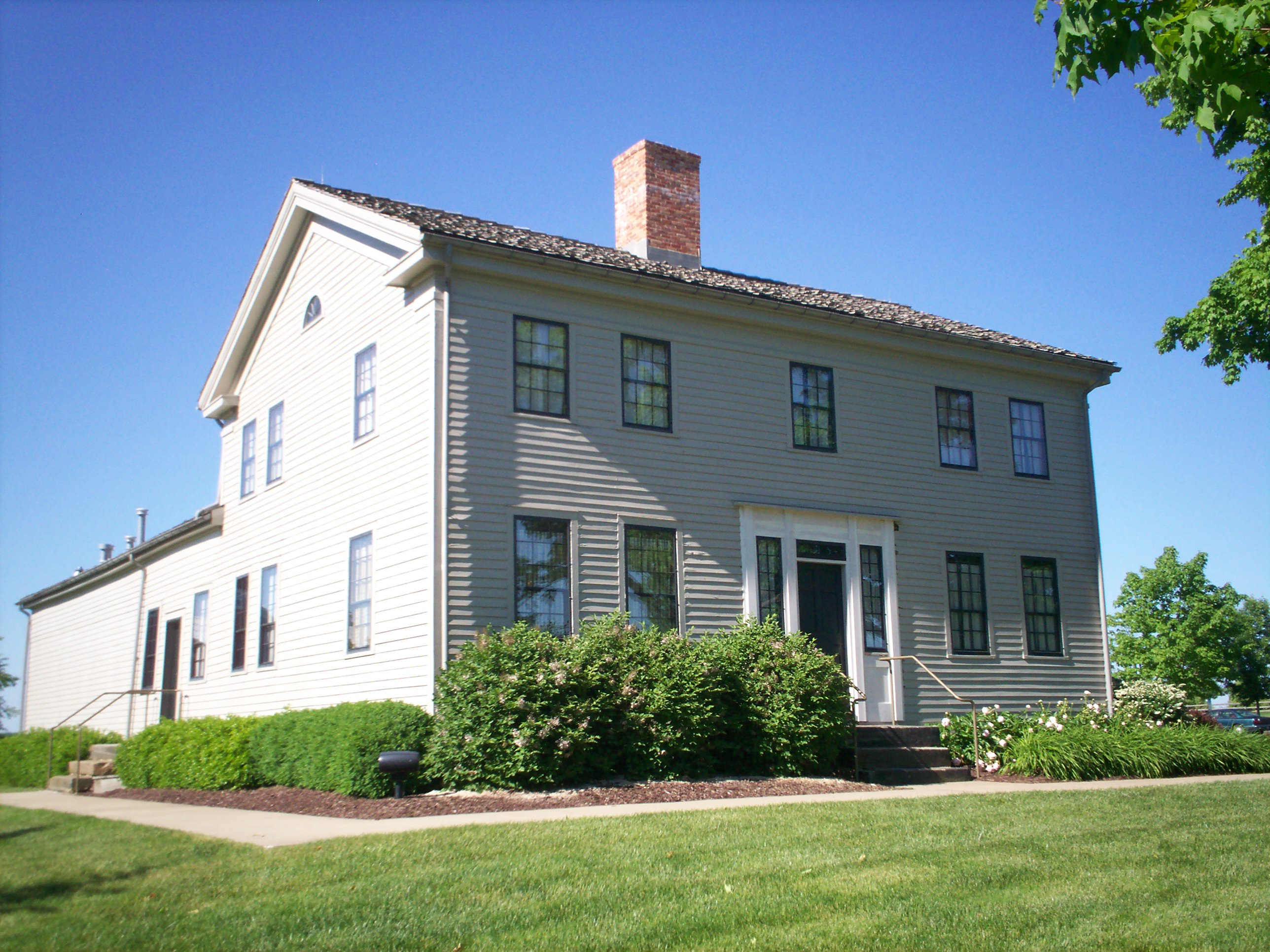

- Location within Ohio Location within the United States
- Location: Hiram Township, Portage County, Ohio
- Coordinates: 41°17′48″N 81°10′5″W
- Architectural style: Colonial
- NRHP reference No.: 76001512
- Added to NRHP: 12 December 1976

The John Johnson farm is a historic home and listing on the National Register of Historic Places in Hiram Township, just west of the village of Hiram, Ohio, United States. The home, built in 1828, is a significant location in the history of the Latter Day Saint movement as the home of Joseph Smith and his family from September 1831 to March 1832. While Smith lived at the home, it served as the headquarters of the Church of Christ and was the site of several revelations to Smith and other Church leaders. The Johnson Farm is also significant as the site of the tarring and feathering of Joseph Smith and Sidney Rigdon in March 1832.

The Smiths returned to Kirtland in 1832 and the Johnsons moved to Kirtland the following year. The Church of Jesus Christ of Latter-day Saints purchased the property in 1956 and began using it as a historical site. From 1971 to 2002, the adjoining farm was used to grow and process apples and strawberries as part of the Church's welfare program. The home was added to the National Register of Historic Places in 1976 and restored to its original appearance in 2001. It continues to operate as a tourist attraction, staffed by volunteer missionaries.

== Background ==
John and Mary Elsa Johnson came to Hiram with their 10 children in 1818 and bought 100 acres (40 ha) on both sides of modern-day Pioneer Trail. Initially, they lived in a log cabin on the south side of the road before building the colonial style house in 1828. The family used the farm to grow apples and corn, along with raising dairy cattle they used to make cheese, which was sold throughout the region and as far away as New York. The Johnsons sold the home and property to the Stevens family in 1833 when they moved to Kirtland and it was passed through four generations before being purchased by the Church of Jesus Christ of Latter-day Saints in 1956. The home was added to the National Register of Historic Places in 1976 and restored to its original 1828 appearance between 1996 and 2001. The restored house was rededicated by LDS Church president Gordon B. Hinckley in late 2001.

== Doctrinal developments ==
Several revelations were received by Smith and other church leaders while at the Johnson Farm. Sixteen of the sections of the Doctrine and Covenants were received. Among these revelations were section 1 (the introduction) and section 76 (the vision of the degrees of glory). As part of section 76, Smith and Sidney Rigdon stated, "And now, after the many testimonies which have been given of [Jesus Christ], this is the testimony, last of all, which we give of him: That he lives! For we saw him, even on the right hand of God; and we heard the voice bearing record that he is the Only Begotten of the Father". Smith also completed part of his revision of the Bible at the Johnson home.

== Tarring and feathering of Joseph Smith ==
On the night of March 24, 1832, Smith and his wife Emma were caring for their adopted twins, both of whom were sick with the measles. While Joseph was sleeping on the trundle bed on the first floor of the Johnson home, a mob of about 25 attacked him and dragged him out the front door. Smith struggled with the mob but was overcome. The mob choked him, tried to put acid in his mouth, and tarred and feathered him. When Smith got back to the house, Emma thought that the tar was blood and she fainted. Smith's friends spent the rest of the night cleaning the tar off of his body. The next day, Smith preached a sermon to a crowd which included some of the mobbers and baptized three people. One of the twin babies, the eleven-month-old boy named Joseph Murdock Smith, died four days later.

A late second-hand witness, Clark Braden, alleged that Eli Johnson—whom Braden claimed was a son of John Johnson—led the attack and that its intent was to punish Smith for a supposed improper relationship with his sister Marinda. Two other antagonistic witnesses, Hayden and S. F. Whitney, claimed that the motive was economic. However, Eli was, in fact, a brother to John Johnson (and an uncle to Marinda) and was living with the family at the time. The mob enlisted the services of a physician to castrate Smith. However, in the end, the physician refused to administer the procedure.

== See also ==
- National Register of Historic Places listings in Portage County, Ohio
