= Kirtland Temple =

Historic Latter Day Saint temple in Ohio, United States

- Historic site
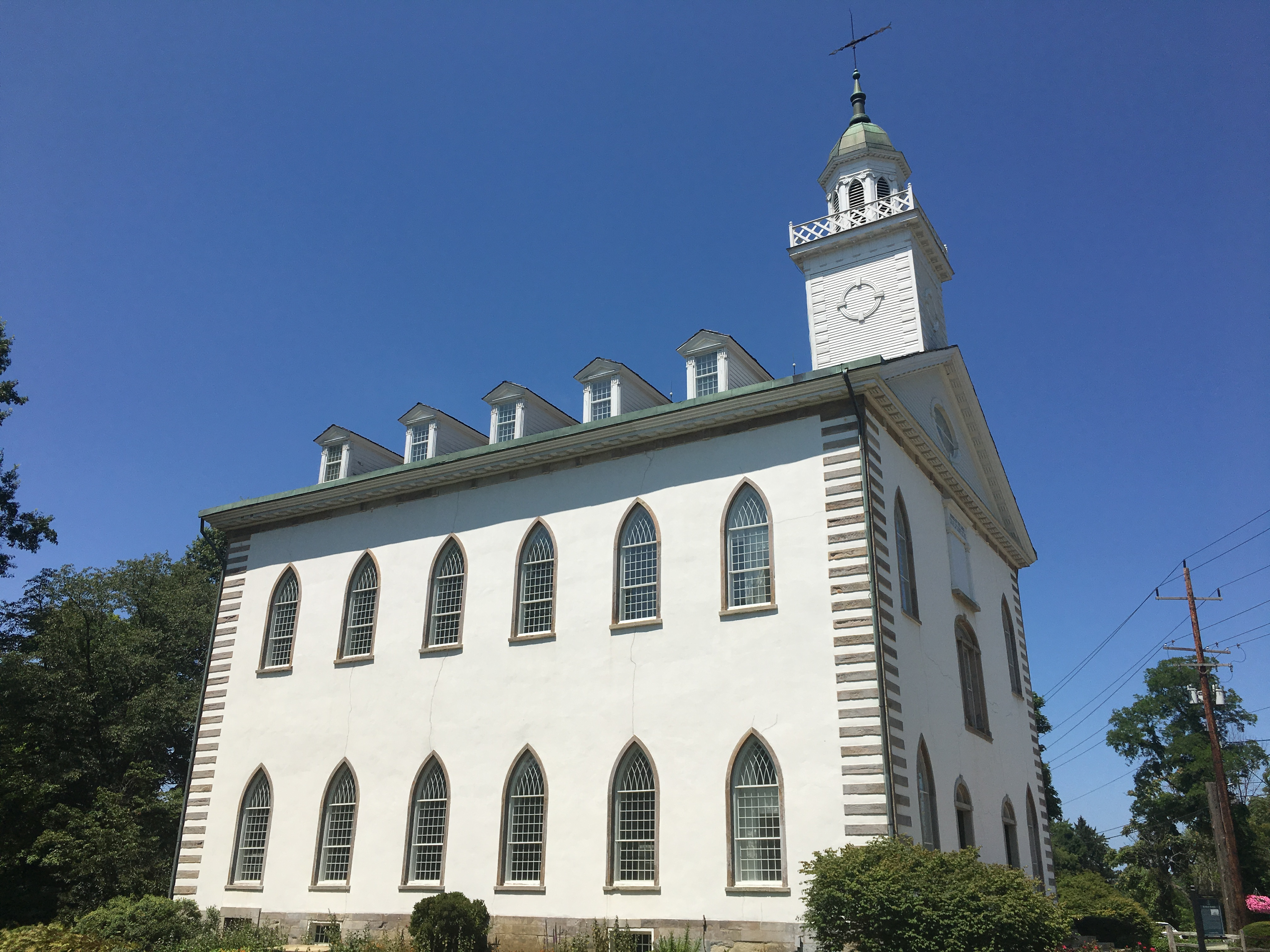
- Interactive map of Kirtland Temple
- Dedication: March 27, 1836, by Joseph Smith
- Site: 5.8 acres (2.3 ha)
- Floor area: 15,000 ft^{2} (1,400 m^{2})
- Official website • News & images

Church chronology
Kirtland Temple	→ Nauvoo Temple

Additional information
- Announced: December 27, 1832, by Joseph Smith
- Groundbreaking: June 5, 1833
- Location: Kirtland, Ohio, United States
- Coordinates: 41°37′31″N 81°21′44″W
- Exterior finish: Sandstone and stucco
- Design: Federal Georgian and New England Colonial
- Notes: Ownership transferred from Community of Christ to The Church of Jesus Christ of Latter-day Saints on March 5, 2024.

- Kirtland Temple
- U.S. National Register of Historic Places
- U.S. National Historic Landmark
- Location within Ohio Location within the United States
- Location: Kirtland, Ohio
- Coordinates: 41°37′31″N 81°21′44″W
- Built: 1833
- Architect: Smith, Joseph; Et al.
- Architectural style: Gothic, Federal
- NRHP reference No.: 69000145
- Added to NRHP: June 4, 1969

The Kirtland Temple, located in Kirtland, Ohio, is the first temple built by adherents of the Latter Day Saint movement, also known as Mormons, dedicated in March 1836. Joseph Smith, the movement's founder, directed the construction following a series of reported revelations, and the temple showcases a blend of Federal, Greek Revival, and Gothic Revival architectural styles. It was added to the National Register of Historic Places in 1969 and named a National Historic Landmark in 1977. The temple is owned and operated by The Church of Jesus Christ of Latter-day Saints (LDS Church). Prior to March 5, 2024, the temple was owned and operated by Community of Christ (previously known as The Reorganized Church of Jesus Christ of Latter Day Saints (RLDS)) for over a century.

Construction of the Kirtland Temple was a community effort involving significant contributions from church members, including the establishment of a sawmill and an ashery to supply building materials. The temple features unique architectural elements such as adjustable pews and dual pulpits, reflecting its multifunctional use for worship and education. The third floor was used for academic and religious instruction, emphasizing the importance of Hebrew studies to the faith's theological development.

The dedication on March 27, 1836, was attended by approximately 1,000 people and included traditional rites such as the Hosanna shout. Reports of visions and spiritual experiences by church leaders, including the restoration of certain priesthood keys through ancient prophets Moses, Elias (believed by members of the Church of Jesus Christ of Latter-day Saints to be a contemporary of Abraham), and Elijah, were documented and later canonized in Section 110 of the Doctrine and Covenants. These keys represented various aspects of religious authority, including the gathering of Israel, the gospel of Abraham, and sealing powers. Not long after the dedication, Joseph Smith and Oliver Cowdery reported seeing Jesus Christ "standing upon the breastwork of the pulpit."

Throughout its history, the Kirtland Temple has undergone various ownership changes and legal disputes, ultimately maintaining its status as a place of worship and historical significance within the Latter Day Saint movement. It continues to serve as a historic site, open year-round for guided tours, meetings, and events, attracting visitors from around the world, and around 100,000 visitors annually.

== Construction ==
In December 1830, Joseph Smith, the founder of the Church of Christ (Latter Day Saints), said he received a revelation directing members of the faith to "assemble together in Ohio." By 1831, members of the church began to gather to the Kirtland area. In December 1832, Smith said he received another revelation that called for the construction of a house of worship, education, and order. On December 27, 1832, he announced that the temple would be built. On May 6, 1833, Smith said he received a revelation from God, directing the church to build "a house ... wholly dedicated unto the Lord for the work of the presidency," "dedicated unto the Lord from the foundation thereof, according to the order of the priesthood." The First Presidency, which included Smith, Sidney Rigdon, and Frederick G. Williams, oversaw the laying of the temple cornerstone at a ceremony on July 23, 1833. The first cornerstone was laid at the southeast corner and construction began immediately. When the building was first being constructed, it was just known as "the House of the Lord."

According to the diary of Truman O. Angell, the First Presidency reported a detailed shared vision of the inside and outside of the temple, to help show church volunteers the envisioned structure. Scott Barrick, director of Historic Kirtland, says that the visions were "like our (present day) virtual reality."

Directions were given to build a "lower court and a higher court," with a promise given that the Lord's "glory shall be there, and [his] presence shall be there." The initial designs called for an interior that was 55 feet (17 m) wide by 65 feet (20 m) long. The building has two primary gathering spaces: an upper and a lower court (or hall). The lower hall was most often used for worship, including the sacrament (similar to communion), preaching, and prayer. It features two sets of pulpits, one on each end, and adjustable pews that allow the audience to face either direction. The upper hall was used for educational purposes, specifically for the School of the Apostles.

The building's third floor served multiple functions. During the day, it hosted general academic classes, while in the evenings, it was used for church quorum meetings. Church members there studied Hebrew, which lasted only a little over two months, but it came to have a significant impact on the evolution of the faith's theology. It also housed a school known by various names over time: the School of the Prophets, also known as the School of the Elders and the School of the Apostles. Joseph Smith established the school in 1833, drawing on established American traditions and Old Testament practices, with a focus on integrating specific religious practices to unify members and create a cohesive community. Unlike earlier versions, Smith's school required a dedicated temple and ceased formal operations by 1836 as focus shifted to other community preparations. Additionally, the third floor contained various church offices, including that of Joseph Smith.

The interior incorporated unique features, while the exterior was influenced by the New England Protestant style. For example, the arrangement of two series of four-tiered pulpits on each end of the assembly rooms for seating the presidencies of the Melchizedek and Aaronic priesthoods was different from other buildings. The pulpits were designed with golden letters to differentiate offices of presiding officials from the church, from the Melchizedek Priesthood Offices, to the Aaronic Priesthood offices. (An example of this is using the letters M.P.C. This stood for Melchizedek Presiding Council- also known as the First Presidency). Church members donated labor and building materials, including glass and pottery which was ground up into the stucco. Crushed glassware was mixed with stucco to make the walls appear glistening.

Building the Kirtland Temple was a community effort. At the time of building the Kirtland temple, members of the church were in poverty and funds were scarce. Berea sandstone was chiseled from the Stannard Quarry at the base of Gildersleeve Mountain, and lumber was gathered from the surrounding area, particularly from the gravel pits on the other side of Gildersleeve Mountain along Hobart Road. In order to speed up the building process, in the fall of 1833 church members built a sawmill on Stoney Brook in Kirtland. An ashery was built by Newel K. Whitney during 1823 and 1824. The sawmill was built adjacent to the ashery, and both were used to supply materials to build the temple. At the sawmill, laborers crafted the interior support timbers and intricate woodwork found throughout the temple. The church bought 16 acres of old-growth forest to provide lumber to build the temple. Logs of walnut, cedar, cherry, and white oak were floated on the Chagrin River a few hundred yards to the sawmill where they were cut and used to build the temple. The temple was planned to be at the center of a community; church leaders designed a plat for the Kirtland temple similar to the one planned for Zion in Jackson County, Missouri. Nearly all able bodied men who were not away on missions for the church worked on the temple.

Under the supervision of Emma Smith, Joseph's wife, the women of Kirtland contributed to the temple's construction by sewing clothing for the workers and crafting materials for the temple itself. They produced carpets and curtains from white canvas, which were utilized to partition the spacious first and second floors of the temple into more private, smaller sections. Additionally, these curtains were strategically placed above the pulpits to offer privacy as required. During the day, the men would construct the temple, and by night would guard it from mobs and vandals.

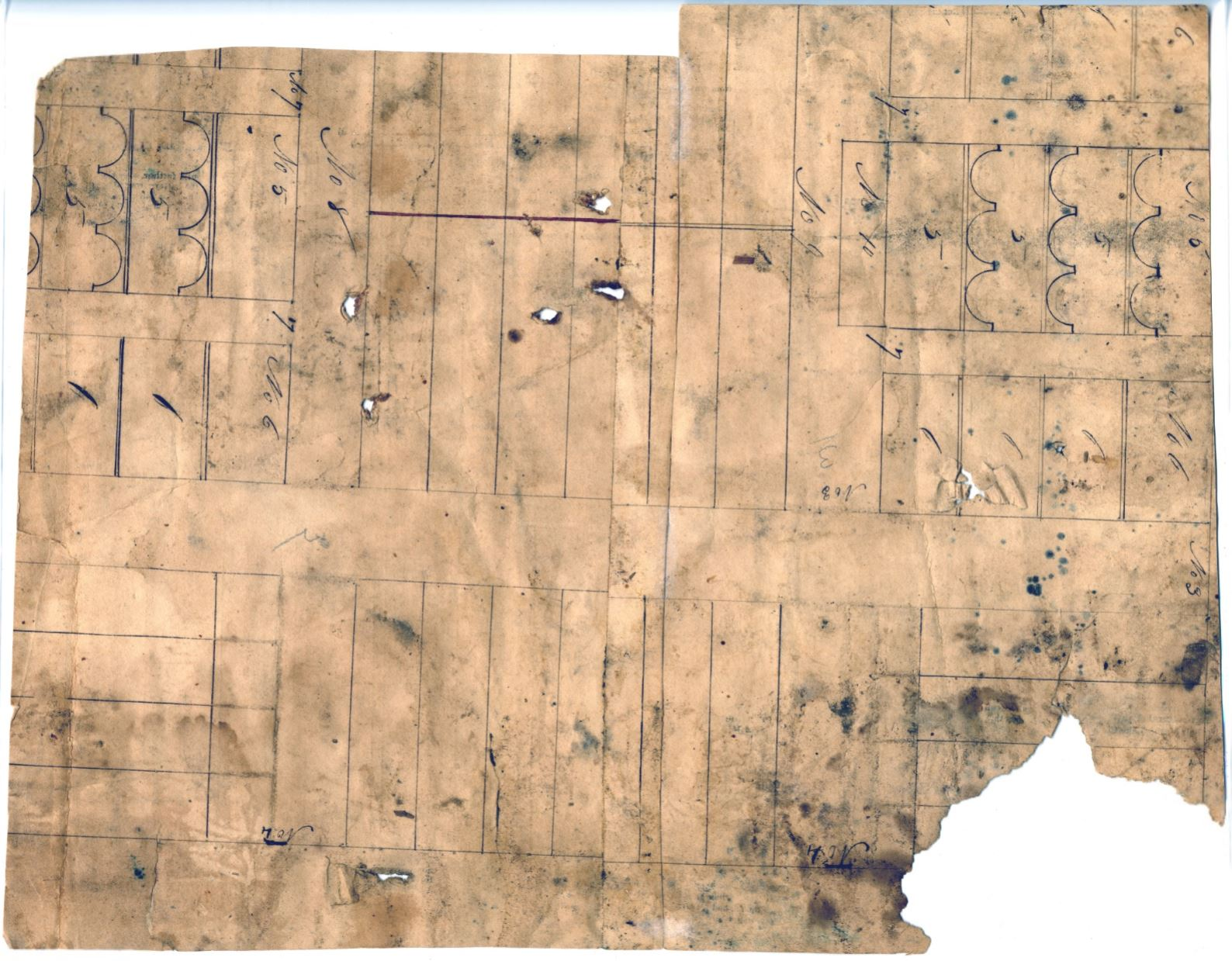
Plans for the Kirtland House of the Lord. On the other side are pasted ancient Egyptian Papyri Fragments, part of the collection Joseph Smith used to translate the Book of Abraham

Many church members were important to the construction of the Kirtland Temple. Of particular note is Artemus Millet, who has been credited for providing the method of the exterior wall construction, head stonemason, creating the mix of the exterior stucco, and as the superintendent of construction for a portion of the work. There is some disagreement as to the question if Millet was baptized before or after his building skills were needed and recommended by Brigham and Joseph Young. Either way, he was baptized by Brigham and confirmed by Joseph while in Canada, and Millet came afterwards to help provide methods, labor, and financial support for the building of the Kirtland Temple.

This was the first structure of its kind built by early Latter Day Saints. The Kirtland Temple is different in purpose from the Nauvoo Temple, built in the 1840s, and from other temples that followed in the Latter Day Saint movement. The temple was used as both a meetinghouse and a formally dedicated temple. At the time of its construction, none of the ordinances now associated with Latter-day Saint temple worship, such as baptism by proxy, endowments, and sealings, had been instituted. The practice of baptisms for the dead was not in use by the church until 1840. According to Tad Walch, from Deseret News, the endowment was given "in full" at the Nauvoo Red Brick Store, in 1842.

The Kirtland Temple was not originally white on the exterior as it is today. The original exterior was a bluish-gray according to Truman Coe, a local minister in the 1830s. The roof is believed to have been red, and the front doors olive green. Presently, only the doors are the original color.

Temples of nearly identical design were planned at about the same time period in Missouri at the Temple Lot in Independence, Far West, and Adam-ondi-Ahman. However, none were built because of the 1838 Mormon War which evicted the members from the state. The building cost $40,000 to construct. The interior has over 2,500 windowpanes.

== Dedication ==
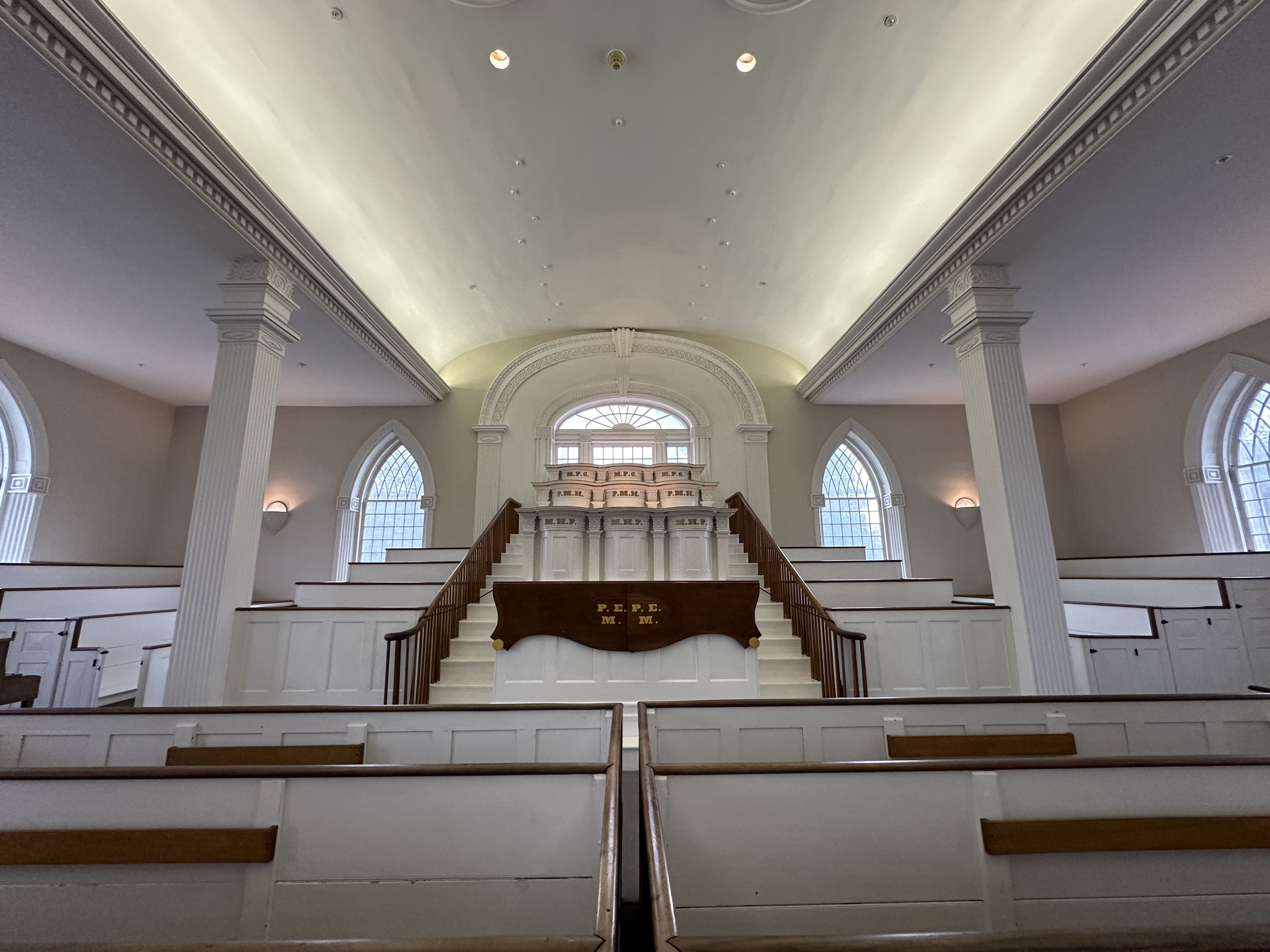
Interior view of lower court showing the west pulpits where the dedication was held March 27, 1836

The temple was dedicated in a seven-hour service on March 27, 1836. The temple was filled to double its capacity, and many people who wanted to participate could not fit into the packed building. To address their disappointment, Joseph Smith directed them to a nearby schoolhouse used as an overflow building. The service was repeated for them the following Thursday.

A reported "one thousand persons" attended the gathering, which introduced such traditional dedication rites as the Hosanna Shout and singing of the hymn written by W. W. Phelps entitled "The Spirit of God Like a Fire Is Burning." Following a two-and-a-half-hour sermon given by Rigdon, Smith offered a dedicatory prayer that had been prepared by a committee of church leaders, which he indicated was given to him by revelation. Two other church leaders, Brigham Young and David W. Patten, were reported to have been inspired to speak in tongues following the prayer (Messenger and Advocate (March 1836)). Truman O. Angell recorded in his journal the following account:

When about midway during the prayer, there was a glorious sensation passed through the house [Kirtland Temple]; and we, having our heads bowed in prayer, felt a sensation very elevating to the soul. At the close of the prayer, F. G. Williams being in the upper east stand- -Joseph being in the speaking stand next below—rose and testified that midway during the prayer an holy angel came and seated himself in the stand. When the afternoon meeting assembled, Joseph, feeling very much elated, arose the first thing and said the personage who had appeared in the morning was the Angel Peter come to accept the dedication.

On Easter Sunday, April 3, 1836, coinciding with the Jewish Passover, Joseph Smith and Oliver Cowdery reported experiencing a significant event at the Kirtland Temple. It is recounted that the Lord manifested Himself to them, expressing acceptance of the temple. This event involved the restoration of certain priesthood keys through ancient prophets, namely Moses, Elias, and Elijah. These keys were said to represent various aspects of religious authority, including the gathering of Israel, the gospel of Abraham, and sealing powers.

One of the main purposes of building the temple was to follow one of the Lord's commandments and to be endowed with power. In order to receive their endowment, the men needed to finish building the temple and they needed to spiritually, mentally, and physically prepare. Part of the preparations involved ceremonial washings and anointings, symbolizing the purification of their hearts to enable communion with heaven. A few months prior to the temple dedication, Phelps expressed, "We are preparing to make ourselves clean, by first cleansing our hearts, forsaking our sins, forgiving everybody; … putting on clean decent clothes, by anointing our heads and by keeping all the commandments."

It's noted that while certain ordinances were performed in the Kirtland Temple, they were considered only a partial endowment, and the Kirtland temple is not the site of the first full temple endowment. The full endowment, according to accounts, was anticipated to occur later when the community settled in Nauvoo.

== Visions and miracles ==
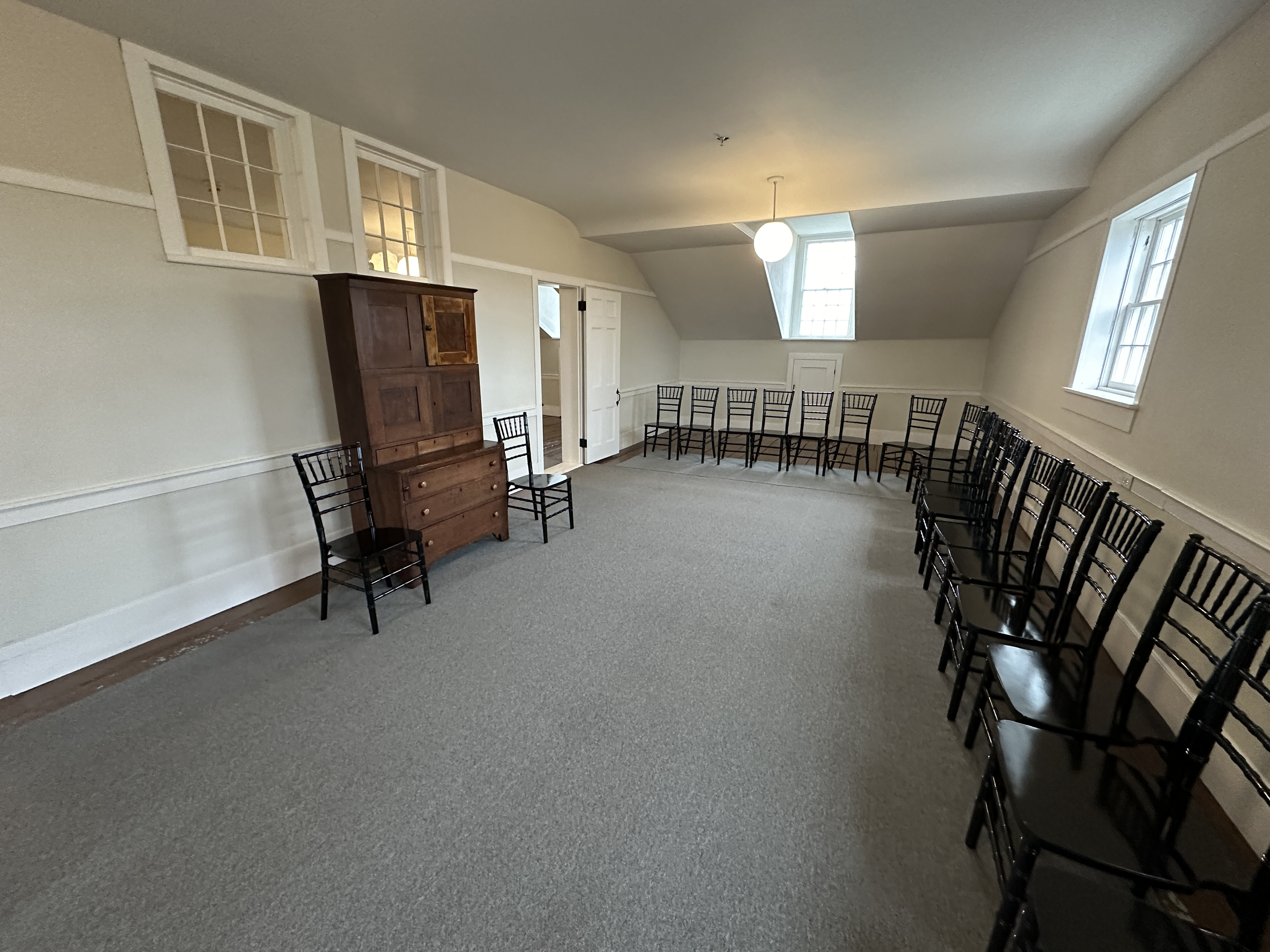
Far western classroom on the third floor of the temple that served as Joseph Smith's private study. It is where LDS D&C Section 137 was received

On January 21, 1836, before the temple was completed, Smith wrote in his journal the first of several visions received at the temple. As he and his associates performed a feet washing and anointing ritual, he saw "the celestial kingdom of God, and the glory thereof ... [and] the blazing throne of God, whereon was seated the Father and the Son." In addition, Smith said the streets looked like they were paved with gold, and then taught that any who died without learning about the (restored) gospel who would have embraced it would go to the Celestial Kingdom (The highest level of Heaven in Latter Day Saint theology). Smith also reported seeing Adam, Abraham, and three family members, only one of which had previously died; this experience of Smith was canonized by the LDS Church as revelation and published as Section 137 of the Doctrine and Covenants for the first time in 1981.

Days after the dedication, several more visions were recorded in his personal journal. On April 3, Smith had his scribe, Warren Cowdery, write down in his personal journal an account of a spiritual experience Smith and Oliver Cowdery had while praying in the pulpits. In this experience, Smith states that he and Cowdery saw Jesus Christ "standing upon the breastwork of the pulpit." According to Smith's account, Christ accepted the church's dedication of the temple, and promised blessings according to their obedience. Following the conclusion of this vision of Christ, the account goes on to tell of Smith and Cowdery then receiving visions of Moses, Elias, and Elijah. The account in Smith's journal is the only known telling of this occurrence during his lifetime. The LDS Church canonized it as Section 110 of their Doctrine and Covenants in 1876.

== Shifting ownership ==
Smith's time in Kirtland after the temple came into use was limited. In 1837, he became involved with the foundation of a bank known as the Kirtland Safety Society. The failure of this bank was a factor that caused a schism among Latter Day Saints in Kirtland. The dissenters were led by Warren Parrish, Smith's former secretary, and included Martin Harris, one of the Three Witnesses of The Book of Mormon. Parrish's group took control of the temple and other church property. By the beginning of 1838, Smith was forced to flee the state, relocating to Far West, Missouri with hundreds of loyalists. After the Mormons moved west in 1838, the temple was used by the Western Reserve Teacher's Seminary. Parrish's group dissolved and by 1841 the remaining Latter Day Saints in Kirtland had come back into communion with the main body of the church, which had subsequently relocated to Nauvoo, Illinois.

A period of confusion followed Smith's death in 1844, as rival leaders and factions vied for control of the temple. In 1845, the Latter Day Saints in Kirtland, under the leadership of S. B. Stoddard, Leonard Rich, and Jacob Bump organized their own church in opposition to those of Brigham Young, James J. Strang and other leaders. This group later merged with a faction led by William E. McLellin whose president was David Whitmer, one of the Three Witnesses.

By 1848, another Latter Day Saint faction led by Hazen Aldrich and James Collin Brewster was organized in Kirtland and maintained control of the temple. This faction also dissolved and most of the members who were in Kirtland eventually joined the Community of Christ (then known as the Church of Jesus Christ of Latter Day Saints, adding the word Reorganized to their name in 1872) led by Joseph Smith III. In 1860, a probate court in Ohio sold the Kirtland Temple as a means of paying off some debts owned by Joseph Smith's estate. Joseph Smith III and Mark Hill Forscutt purchased a quitclaim deed to the temple in 1874.

In 1880, the RLDS Church began the Kirtland Temple Suit, in an attempt to gain clear legal title to the temple. The court opinion stated that the RLDS Church was the lawful successor of the original church, but ultimately dismissed the case. Although the case had no legal bearing, the RLDS Church secured ownership of the temple through adverse possession by at least 1901.

The local RLDS congregation met in the building on a regular basis for Sunday worship until the 1950s. Due to preservation concerns, a new church was built across the street (for the congregation) and the temple saw more direct management and funding from the world church. Until early 2024, the building was used for approximately 50 to 60 worship services, classes, retreats and other special events throughout the year primarily by various Latter Day Saint denominations.

Unlike the later built Nauvoo Temple, the Kirtland Temple was never destroyed or burned down. The same stones from the original construction are still in place. From its inception to the present day, it has always been operated by a group that can trace their origins to the Latter Day Saint movement. It has been a place of worship and a symbol of the movement since it was dedicated in 1836.

Community of Christ owned and operated the Kirtland Temple for more than 140 years. The LDS Church and Community of Christ announced on March 5, 2024, that ownership of the site had transferred to the former as part of a $192.5 million acquisition of historic sites and objects. Negotiations between the two churches began in 2021. The transfer included a number of other historical items and buildings, including the Community of Christ visitors' centers in Kirtland and Nauvoo, Nauvoo historic sites like the Red Brick Store, Nauvoo House, Mansion House, and Smith Family Homestead, as well as several artifacts, such as a Bible used by Joseph Smith in the Joseph Smith Translation of the Bible, the original door to Liberty Jail, and several other items and manuscripts. This followed earlier transfers of historic property from Community of Christ to the LDS Church, including the Joseph and Emma Smith home in Kirtland and properties in Missouri in 2012, and the printer's manuscript of the Book of Mormon in 2017.

== Historic site ==
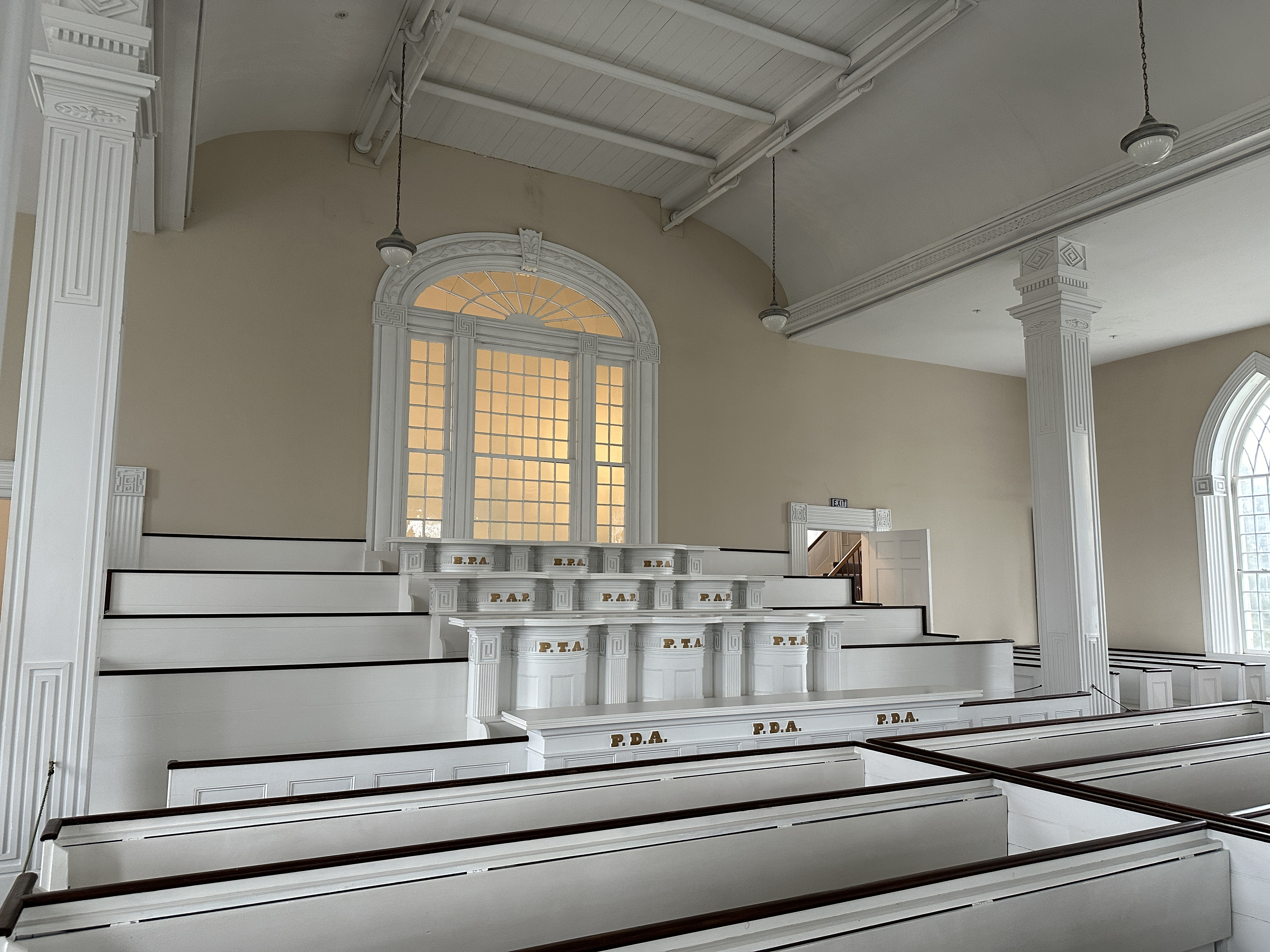
Interior view of the east pulpits in the upper court of the Kirtland Temple

The Kirtland Temple was used as the meetinghouse for Kirtland's RLDS congregation until the 1950s, when a modern church was built across the street. The temple was then experienced through guided tours, community services, and pre-arranged meetings for out-of-town groups. The temple was added to the National Register of Historic Places in 1969 and was named a National Historic Landmark in 1977.

The visitors' center has about 100,000 visitors per year, and according to Sarah Murphy from ABC4 Utah, brings in hundreds of visitors from around the world every week. During the ownership of Community of Christ, temple guides were typically local residents, usually, but not always, members of Community of Christ. During the busy summer months, college-aged adults augmented the temple's staff as part of the Alma Blair Internship Program. Throughout the year, other volunteers traveled to the temple for stints as guides, maintenance staff, or gardeners. Under the ownership of the LDS Church, tours are guided by sister and senior missionaries, managed as part of the larger Historic Kirtland Village sites.

There were about 50 worship services and/or educational events held each year at the Kirtland Temple. The temple held community services for Thanksgiving, Christmas Eve, and Holy Week, as well as the annual Emma Smith Hymn Festival in June. Additionally, members of various Latter Day Saint denominations travel to the temple where they are permitted to hold their own services with prior arrangement.

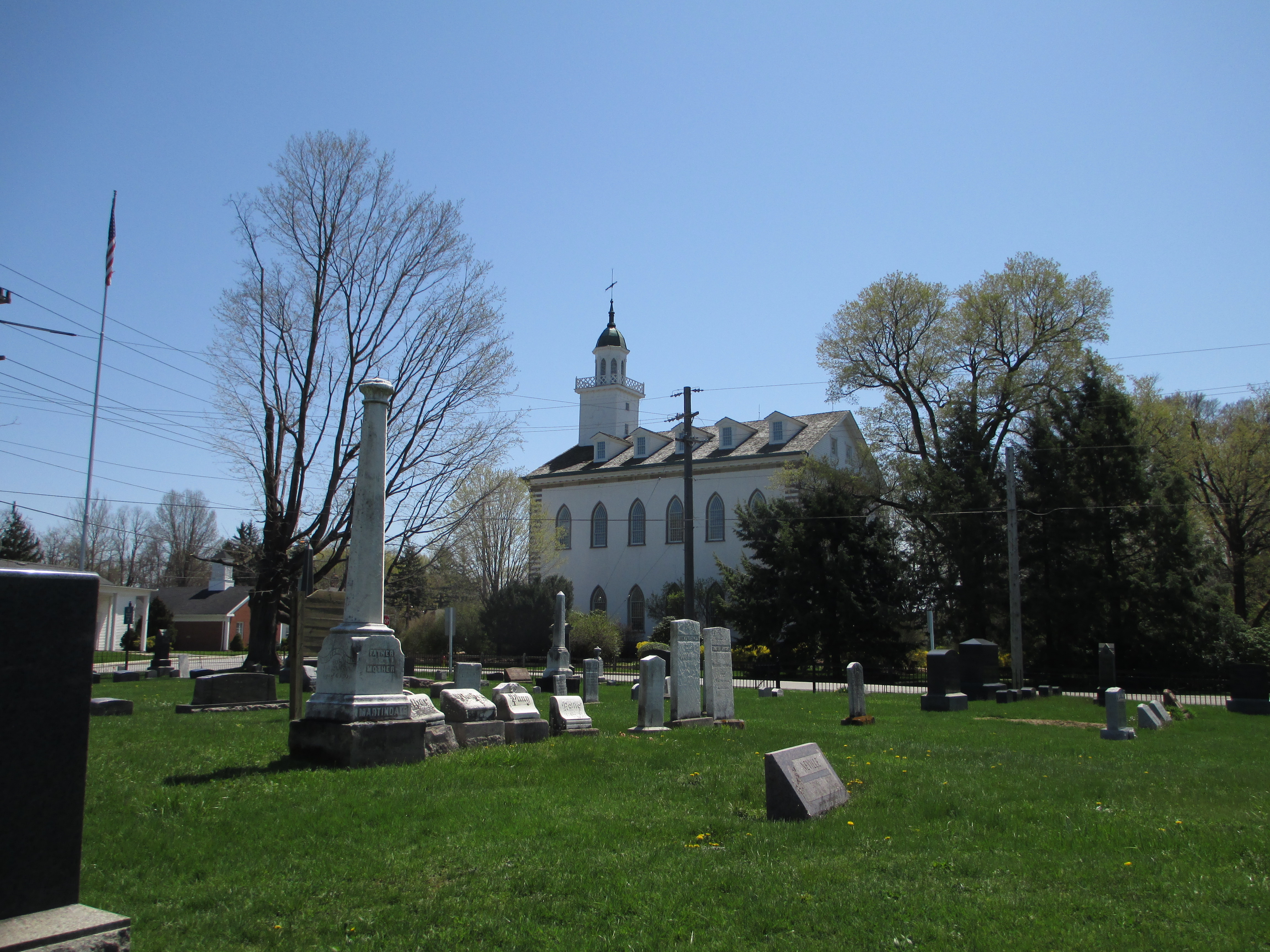
View of the temple from the historic Kirtland North Cemetery

A Spiritual Formation and Visitors' Center was opened in March 2007. The center's exterior is inspired by that of the Kirtland Temple, and its layout has been described as reflecting a dove. It enhances the ministries of the temple by providing classroom space, worship space, a multi-use theater, offices, and a small museum. The museum contains artifacts related to the temple and original documents from the Kirtland era. Until 2024, there was also a museum gift shop which featured a broad selection of books on Latter Day Saint history and the various expressions of the movement.

Gardens are located outside the temple and immediately north of the temple on the opposite side of Maple Street is the historic Kirtland North Cemetery, which has graves dating back to the 1820s. Just beyond the cemetery to the north is the restored Joseph and Emma Smith home, while the remaining sites of Historic Kirtland Village are a short distance further north.

With the LDS Church's acquisition of the temple on March 5, 2024, it will remain a historic building and the church reopened it to the public March 25, 2024 for public tours at no charge.

== Sources ==
- Arrington, Leonard J. (1966). Great Basin Kingdom: An Economic History of the Latter-day Saints (First Bison Book ed.). University of Nebraska Press.
