= List of Zion's Camp participants =

The following individuals participated in Zion's Camp:

== Men ==
1. Hazen Aldrich
2. Joseph S. Allen
3. Isaac Allred
4. James Allred
5. Martin Allred
6. Milo Andrus
7. Solomon Angell
8. Allen A. Avery
9. Almon W. Babbitt
10. Alexander Badlam
11. Samuel Baker
12. Nathan Bennett Baldwin
13. Elam Barber
14. Israel Barlow
15. Lorenzo D. Barnes
16. Edson Barney
17. Royal Barney
18. Henry Benner
19. Samuel Bent
20. Hiram Backman
21. Lorenzo Booth
22. Daniel Bowen
23. George W. Brooks
24. Albert Brown
25. Harry Brown
26. Samuel Brown
27. John Brownell
28. Peter Buchanan
29. Alden Burdick
30. Harrison Burgess
31. David Byur
32. William F. Cahoon
33. John Carpenter
34. John S. Carter
35. Daniel Cathcart
36. Alonzo Champlin
37. Jacob Chapman
38. William Cherry
39. John M. Chidester
40. Alden Childs
41. Nathaniel Childs
42. Stephen Childs
43. Albert Clements
44. Thomas Colborn
45. Alanson Colby
46. Zera S. Cole
47. Zebedee Coltrin
48. Libeus T. Coon
49. Horace Cowan
50. Lyman Curtis
51. Mecham Curtis
52. Solomon W. Denton
53. Peter Doff
54. David D. Dort
55. John Duncan
56. James Dunn
57. Philemon Duzette
58. Philip Ettleman
59. Bradford W. Elliot
60. David Elliot
61. David Evans
62. Asa Field
63. Edmund Fisher
64. Alfred Fisk
65. Hezekiah Fisk
66. Elijah Fordham
67. George Fordham
68. Frederick Forney
69. John Fossett
70. James Foster
71. Solon Foster
72. Jacob Gates
73. Benjamin Gifford
74. Levi Gifford
75. Sherman Gilbert
76. Tru Glidden
77. Dean C. Gould
78. Jedediah M. Grant
79. Addison Green
80. Michael Griffith
81. Everett Griswold
82. Elisha H. Groves
83. Joseph Hancock
84. Levi W. Hancock
85. Joseph Harmon
86. Henry Herriman
87. Martin Harris
88. Joseph Hartshorn
89. Thomas Hayes
90. Nelson Higgins
91. Seth Hitchcock
92. Amos Hogers
93. Chandler Holbrook
94. Joseph Holbrook
95. Milton Holmes
96. Ornon Houghton
97. Marshal Hubbard
98. Solomon Humphrey
99. Joseph Huntsman
100. John Hustin
101. Elias Hutchins
102. Heman T. Hyde
103. Orson Hyde
104. Warren S. Ingalls
105. Edward Ivie
106. James Russell Ivie
107. John A. Ivie
108. William S. Ivie
109. William Jessop
110. Luke Johnson
111. Lyman E. Johnson
112. Noah Johnson
113. Seth Johnson
114. Isaac Jones
115. Levi Jones
116. Charles Kelley
117. Heber C. Kimball
118. Samuel Kingsley
119. Dennis Lake
120. Jesse B. Lawson
121. L.S. Lewis
122. Josiah Littlefield
123. Lyman O. Littlefield
124. Waldo Littlefield
125. Amasa M. Lyman
126. Moses Martin
127. Edward W. Marvin
128. Reuben McBride
129. Robert McCord
130. Eleazer Miller
131. John Miller
132. Justin Morse
133. John Murdock
134. Freeman Nickerson
135. Levi S. Nickerson
136. Uriah C. Nickerson
137. Joseph Nicholas
138. Joseph B. Noble
139. Uriah North
140. Roger Orton
141. John D. Parker
142. Warren Parrish
143. David W. Patten
144. Orson Pratt
145. Parley P. Pratt
146. William D. Pratt
147. Charles C. Rich
148. Leonard Rich
149. Darwin Richardson
150. Burr Riggs
151. Harpin Riggs
152. Nathaniel Riggs
153. Milcher Riley
154. Alanson Ripley
155. Lewis Robbins
156. Erastus Rudd
157. William Henry Sagers
158. Wilkins Jenkins Salisbury
159. Henry Sherman
160. Lyman Sherman
161. Henry Shibley
162. Cyrus Smalling
163. Avery Smith
164. George A. Smith
165. Hyrum Smith
166. Jackson Smith
167. Joseph Smith
168. Lyman Smith
169. Sylvester Smith
170. William Smith
171. Zechariah B. Smith
172. Willard Snow
173. Zerubbabel Snow
174. Harvey Stanley
175. Hyrum Stratton
176. Daniel Stephens
177. Elias Strong
178. John Joshua Tanner
179. Nathan Tanner
180. Ezra Thayer
181. James L. Thompson
182. Samuel Thompson
183. William. P. Tippetts
184. Tinney Thomas
185. Nelson Tribbs
186. Joel Vaughn
187. Salmon Warner
188. William Weden
189. Elias Wells
190. Alexander Whiteside
191. Andrew W. Whitlock
192. Lyman Wight
193. Eber Wilcox
194. Sylvester B. Wilkinson
195. Frederick G. Williams
196. Alonzo Winchester
197. Benjamin Winchester
198. Stephen Winchester
199. Alvin Winegar
200. Samuel Winegar
201. Hiram Winter
202. Henry Wissmiller
203. Wilford Woodruff
204. Brigham Young
205. Joseph Young

== Women ==
1. Charlotte Alvord
2. Mary Chidester
3. Ada Clements
4. Sophronia Curtis
5. Diana Drake
6. Mary Snow Gates
7. Eunice Holbrook
8. Nancy Lambson Holbrook
9. Mrs. Houghton
10. Sarah Finkle Ripley

== Children ==
1. Eunice Chidester (daughter of John M. Chidester)
2. John P. Chidester (son of John M. Chidester)
3. Charlotte Holbrook (daughter of Joseph Holbrook)
4. Diana Holbrook (daughter of Chandler Holbrook)
5. Sarah Lucretia Holbrook (daughter of Joseph Holbrook)
6. Almira Winegar (daughter of Samuel Winegar)
