= The Church of Jesus Christ of Latter-day Saints in Michigan =

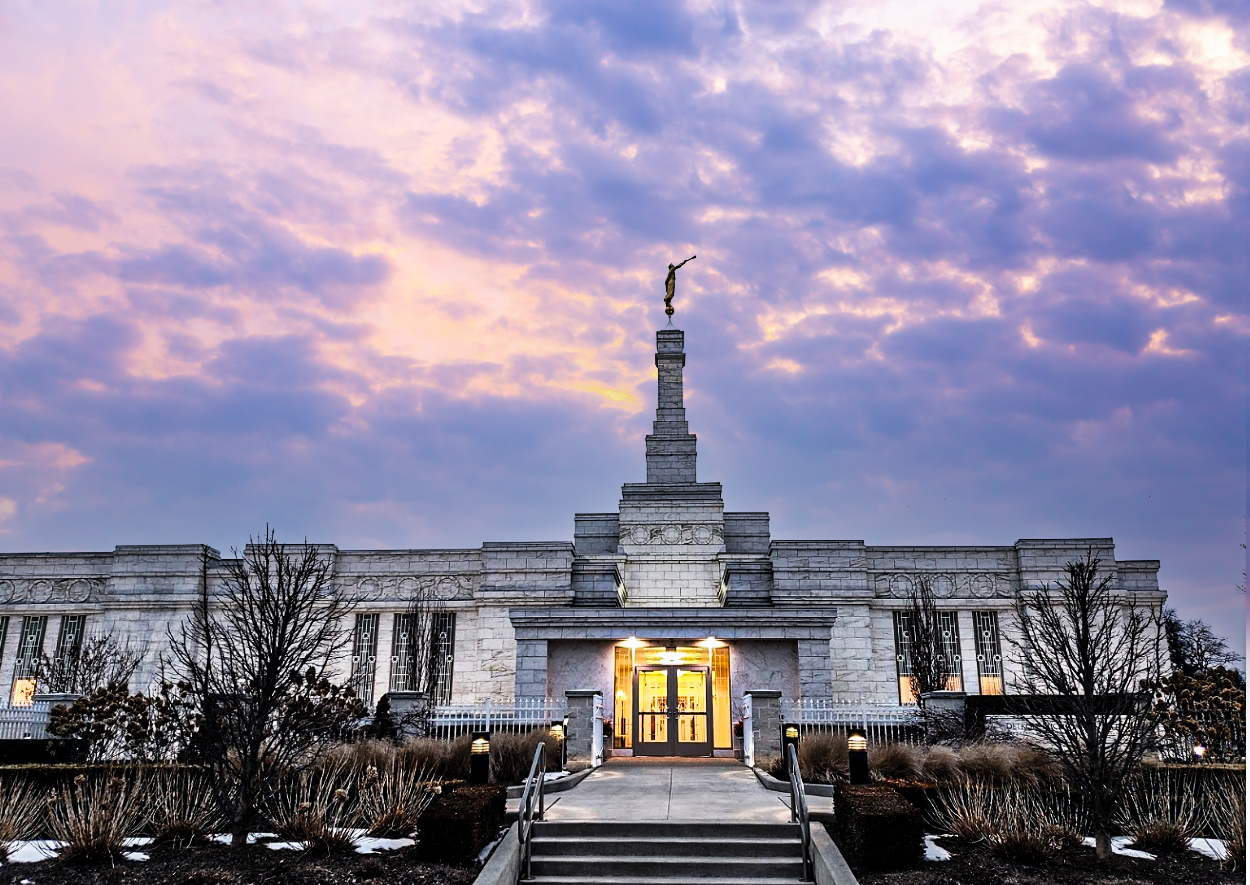
- The Detroit Michigan Temple
- Area: NA Northeast
- Members: 47,105 (2025)
- Stakes: 9
- Districts: 1
- Wards: 61
- Branches: 39
- Total Congregations: 100
- Missions: 2
- Temples: 1 operating 1 announced 2 total
- FamilySearch Centers: 43

The Church of Jesus Christ of Latter-day Saints in Michigan refers to the Church of Jesus Christ of Latter-day Saints (LDS Church) and its members in Michigan. Members of the Church of Jesus Christ of Latter-day Saints arrived in Michigan in the 1830s, and while the Church did not continue to have an organized presence in the state from the late 1850s into the 1870s, missionary work was reopened then by Cyrus Wheelock and has progressed steadily since.

The official church membership as a percentage of general population was 0.44% in 2014. According to the 2014 Pew Forum on Religion & Public Life survey, less than 1% of Michiganders self-identify themselves most closely with The Church of Jesus Christ of Latter-day Saints. The LDS Church is the 13th largest denomination in Michigan.

Today there are more than 45,000 church members in the state in 100 congregations. A temple in Detroit was dedicated in 1999 with a temple announced to be constructed in Grand Rapids.

== History ==
Membership in Michigan
Year	Membership
1891	47
1930	972
1945	7,183
1980	22,607
1990	28,245
1999	36,888
2009	42,599
2019	45,074
2025	47,105
*Membership was published as a rounded number. Source: Wendall J. Ashton; Jim M. Wall, Deseret News, various years, Church Almanac State Information: Michigan

The Church of Jesus Christ of Latter-day Saints in Michigan began with the Mack family. Almira Mack Scobey had gone to Kirtland, Ohio to visit her cousin Joseph Smith and there they joined the church.

On June 7, 1831 Doctrine and Covenants Section 52 was received which among other things commanded another one of Mack Scobey's cousins Hyrum Smith and also John Murdock to go to Detroit and preach the gospel on the way to Jackson County, Missouri. These two brethren went to Michigan in company with Mack Scobey and Hyrum's (and Joseph's) mother, Lucy Mack Smith. They were also accompanied by Lyman Wight and John Corrill. The missionaries eventually went to Pontiac where they had much success, baptizing several people, including David Dort, the husband of one of the Mack sisters.

In 1833, Joseph Wood and Jared Carter were sent as missionaries to Michigan. Besides Pontiac, they also preached in Rochester and Auburn. Another notable early convert was Samuel Bent, who was a deacon in the Congregational Church in Pontiac.

In 1834, Joseph Smith went to Pontiac and preached in the area. Among those who accompanied him on this trip besides his brother Hyrum were Oliver Cowdery, David Whitmer, Martin Harris, Frederick G. Williams and Robert Orton.

In 1834, a branch of Zion's Camp was organized that set out from Pontiac and eventually met with the main part of Zion's Camp in Illinois. This company was organized by Lyman Wight and Hyrum Smith who had returned to Michigan to organize the company. Elijah Fordham served as the historian and kept a journal of the company.

In 1839, on their way to serve as missionaries in the British Isles, Parley P. Pratt and his brother Orson Pratt stopped in Detroit and stayed with their parents and their brother Anson and his family. While in Detroit they preached several sermons and published a few tracts. One of these was History of the Late Persecution by the State of Missouri Upon the Mormons.

Mephibosheth Serrine was among the missionaries serving at that time, and engaged in debates with representatives of other faiths in such locations at Royal Oak.

Missionaries operated in Wayne County, Oakland County, Washtenaw County, Lapeer County, and Lenawee County. Branches were organized in such places as Lapeer, Michigan, Van Buren Township, Michigan and Livonia, Michigan. In Feb. 1841 a conference was held in Brownstown Township, Michigan where Serrine presided and 140 members attended.

By 1845, there were over 25 branches with 12 branches in Oakland County alone.

After the death of Joseph Smith most members either moved to Nauvoo and then to Utah or joined break away groups such as the one led by James Strang.

=== Resumption of missionary work ===
In May 1876, William Palmer began preaching the gospel in Michigan. He had been called as a missionary by Brigham Young. Palmer focused on Mecosta, Isabella and Montcalm counties.

In 1877, Cyrus Wheelock was sent to Michigan as the mission president. Several missionaries came with him. Among these was John Hafen, a Swiss immigrant who mainly taught German immigrants and Niels Hendrickson who taught Swedish immigrants.

In 1880, Wheelock was released as mission president and was a short time later replaced by Palmer. Palmer remained mission president until 1889.

In 1884, the church received a welcome increase in the number of members in Michigan, but since they were being held in Detroit on polygamy charges at the Federal Prison it did not really help the church. Among these were such early church leaders as David K. Udall and Ammon M. Tenney.

=== Establishment of the church ===
By 1887, Michigan was part of the Indiana Conference.

In 1890, Michigan was not officially included in any of the three conferences of the Northern States Mission.

The church dedicated a chapel in Detroit in 1928. That was the only building the church owned in the state although there were also branches in Flint, Grand Rapids, Jackson, Saginaw and Lansing.

About 1940 the church organized the East Michigan District with a district council to prepare for the shift to being a stake. The District president, Jonathan Snow, had primarily grown up in Michigan because the church had sent his father to manage the salt mines in owned in Detroit when Jonathan was a very young child. The first stake in Detroit was formed in 1952 with George Romney as president. A second stake was formed in Lansing in 1960.

In the 1970s, the Detroit Stake, now renamed the Bloomfield Hills Michigan Stake, had John R. Pfiefer as president. Under his presidency, the calling of Elders Quorum presidents was made as deliberative a process as the calling of bishops.

=== Further Detroit history ===
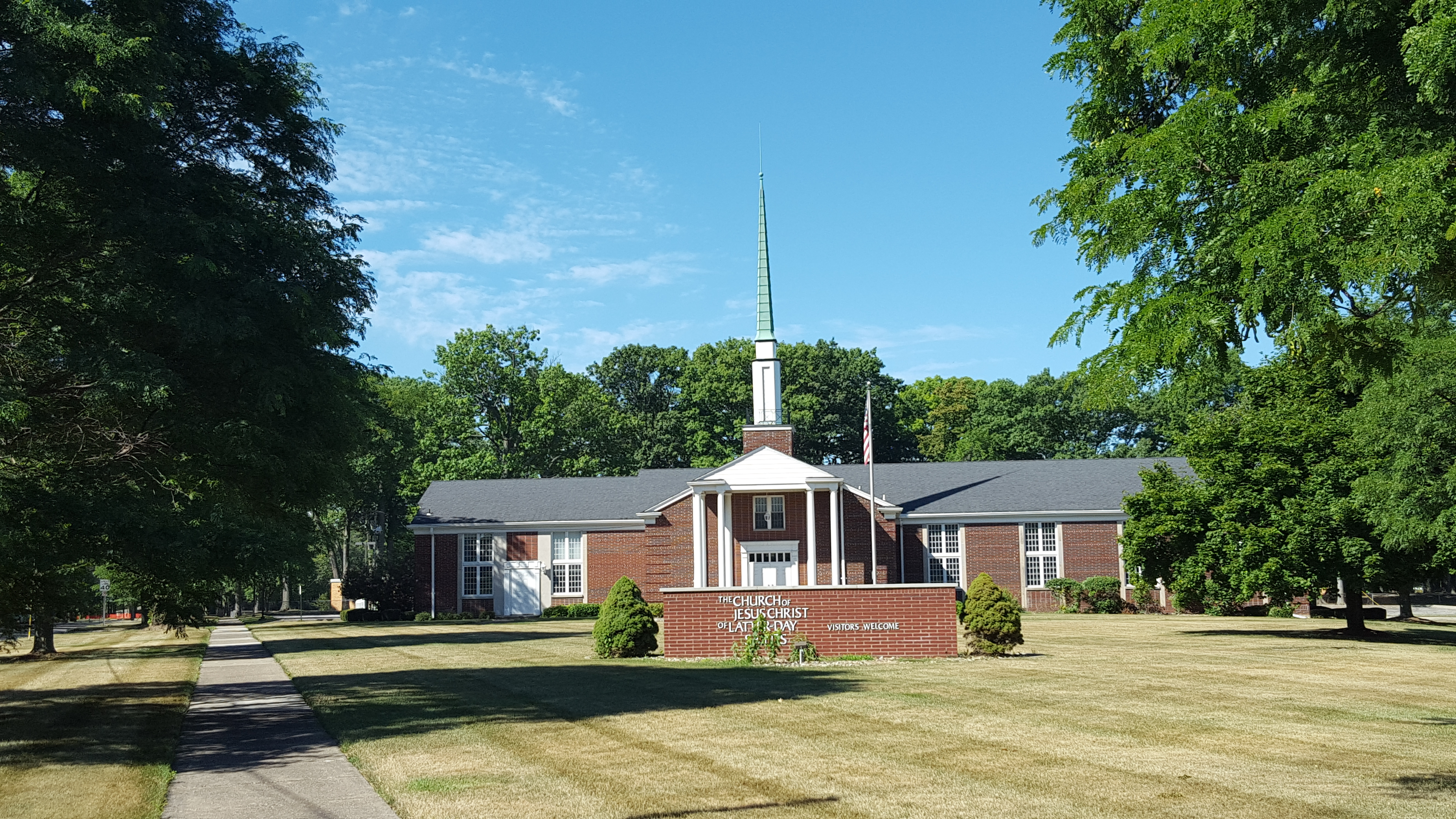
Meetinghouse in Dearborn Michigan

The 1967 Detroit riot fueled a continuing exodus of white Americans from Detroit. Coupled with this the building of Interstate 96 (I-96) led to the destruction of the only chapel the church owned inside the boundaries of the city of Detroit.

With the Stake Center for the Detroit Stake out on Woodward Avenue in Bloomfield Hills dedicated by David O. McKay in 1959, and a later chapel built on 9 Mile Road in Southfield, Michigan just east of Telegraph Road the church began a decline in the city proper. In 1969 the Detroit Stake was split and a new Dearborn Stake was formed. Both stakes included parts of Detroit. In 1974 when the church renamed all stakes, the Detroit Stake became the Bloomfield Hills Michigan Stake.

Nowhere was this shown more clearly than when the Michigan Lansing mission was split in 1978. The new mission was named the Michigan Dearborn Mission, after Dearborn, Michigan. However Michael J. Lantz, a convert to the LDS Church who had joined while serving in the US military in Vietnam during the Vietnam War was the bishop of the Royal Oak Ward by the mid-1980s. His ward was at that point one of four in the Bloomfield Hills Stake that included parts of Detroit. Partly at his urging a new effort was made to send missionaries into the city of Detroit. W. E. Barry Mayo, the president of the Bloomfield Hills Michigan stake who was an immigrant from Canada and had previously served as the first president of the church's branch in Windsor, Ontario before he had moved north of the border, also was involved with these efforts. Under the direction of Mission President Heber Perret, the Detroit Zone was created in 1985 and missionaries were assigned to work in the inner city of Detroit.

By 1989, a branch had been organized in Detroit. In 1991 it was formed into a ward. The ward met in a former Greek Orthodox church building just north of Highland Park, Michigan in the Palmer Park neighborhood. Its first bishop was James Edwards who thus also became the first African American to serve as a bishop in Michigan in the church.

In 1995, the Detroit Ward was split into several branches. There were also two other branches formed in the parts of Detroit in the Westland Stake. One of these branches, the New Center Branch, named after Detroit's historic New Center was presided over by Jim Viland, a European American whose wife was African American. The branches would generally meet in rented locations, often with bars over the windows. In 1997 the Detroit-based branches in the Westland and Bloomfield Hills stakes were made into a district. In 2002 Lamenais Louis, a Haitian immigrant who moved to Detroit in the late 1970s then became the president of the Detroit district. The year before his son Gregoire W Eugene-Louis had been the first person to receive his endowment in the Detroit Michigan Temple before he went on his mission to the California Arcadia Mission (1999–2001).

The Detroit Michigan Temple was dedicated in 1999 by Gordon B. Hinckley. Hinckley's son, Clark Hinckley, had lived for several years in Michigan.

In 2005, the Detroit District was realigned with the Bloomfield Hills and Westland Stake. This allowed for more progress, such as the 2008 realignment of the ward and branch boundaries between Detroit, Warren, Eastpointe, Harper Woods and Roseville which allowed for a ward that was almost in Detroit for the first time since the Detroit Ward had been split apart. A chapel for the Belle Isle Branch which covered much of Detroit east of I-75 and south of I-94 as well as the Grosse Pointes was dedicated in June 2008. The dedication was performed by the Bloomfield Hills Stake president, the above- mentioned Michael Lantz. This was the first chapel the church had built in the city of Detroit since the construction of I-96 had knocked down the last chapel. Also in June 2008 a chapel was built for the Detroit River branch, which covered most of Detroit south of I-94 and west of I-75, was dedicated. This branch not only has several African American members but also many Latino members.

=== 2025 Grand Blanc attack ===
In September 2025, a man attacked the stake center in Grand Blanc, killing four people and injuring eight others. The attacker crashed his truck through the front doors, shot at churchgoers, and lit the building on fire. About eight minutes after the attack began, police shot and killed the attacker.

== Stakes and District ==
As of July 2026, the following stakes and district are located in Michigan or include parts of Michigan:

Stake or District	Organized	Mission	Temple District
Ann Arbor Michigan Stake	August 14, 1977	Michigan Detroit	Detroit Michigan
Bloomfield Hills Michigan Stake	November 9, 1952	Michigan Detroit	Detroit Michigan
Farmington Hills Michigan Stake	May 23, 2021	Michigan Detroit	Detroit Michigan
Grand Blanc Michigan Stake	June 11, 1978	Michigan Detroit	Detroit Michigan
Grand Rapids Michigan Stake	March 2, 1975	Michigan Lansing	Detroit Michigan
Green Bay Wisconsin Stake (Note: Stake located outside Michigan with congregation(s) meeting in Michigan)	March 23, 1997	Wisconsin Milwaukee	Chicago Illinois
Holland Michigan Stake	January 16, 2022	Michigan Lansing	Detroit Michigan
Kalamazoo Michigan Stake	December 9, 1979	Michigan Lansing	Detroit Michigan
Lansing Michigan Stake	February 18, 1962	Michigan Lansing	Detroit Michigan
Midland Michigan Stake	December 1, 1968	Michigan Lansing	Detroit Michigan
South Bend Indiana Stake	October 30, 1977	Indiana Fort Wayne	Indianapolis Indiana
Traverse City Michigan District	May 22, 1994	Michigan Lansing	Detroit Michigan
Westland Michigan Stake	January 12, 1969	Michigan Detroit	Detroit Michigan

=== Districts in Michigan ===
- Traverse City Michigan District

== Missions ==
Michigan has two missions headquartered in the state:

- Michigan Detroit Mission, organized July 1978
- Michigan Lansing Mission, organized July 1973

In addition to these two missions, most of the Upper Peninsula is in the Wisconsin Milwaukee Mission (Green Bay Wisconsin Stake). A small portion of Southwest Michigan is in the Indiana Indianapolis Mission (South Bend Indiana Stake).

== Temples ==
Temples in Michigan
- = Operating
- = Under construction
- = Announced
- = Temporarily Closed

On October 23, 1999 the Detroit Michigan Temple was dedicated by President Gordon B. Hinckley.

On October 2, 2022, it was announced that a temple would be built in Grand Rapids, Michigan.

63. Detroit Michigan Temple; Official website; News & images	
Location: Announced: Groundbreaking: Dedicated: Size: Style:	Bloomfield Hills, Michigan, United States; August 10, 1998 by Gordon B. Hinckley; October 10, 1998 by Jay E. Jensen; October 23, 1999 by Gordon B. Hinckley; 10,700 sq ft (990 m^{2}) on a 6.34-acre (2.57 ha) site Classic modern, single-spire design - designed by John Coakley, Sr.
253. Grand Rapids Michigan Temple (Under construction); Official website; News & images	
Location: Announced: Groundbreaking: Size:	Kentwood, Michigan; 2 October 2022 by Russell M. Nelson; 7 December 2024 by Mathias Held; 20,123 sq ft (1,869.5 m^{2}) on a 10.32-acre (4.18 ha) site

== Notable church members in Michigan ==
- Kim S. Cameron, professor at the Ross School of Business at the University of Michigan
- Avard Fairbanks, former professor at the University of Michigan and a freelance designer for Chrysler
- Orrin Hatch, US Senator who served part of his mission in Michigan
- Richard Headlee, 1982 Republican Gubernatorial candidate, author of the "Headlee Amendment"
- Bruce R. McConkie, Apostle, born in Michigan
- Terry Rakolta, American homemaker and activist who led a boycott against the Fox Broadcasting Company sitcom Married... with Children
- George W. Romney, Governor of Michigan 1962–1968
- Lenore Romney, Republican nominee for United States senate in 1970
- Mitt Romney, American businessman, former Governor of Massachusetts and a candidate for the Republican nomination in the 2008 United States presidential election
- Richard B. Stamps, professor of anthropology and archeology at Oakland University
- Howard J. Stoddard, founder of Michigan National Bank
- Arland Thornton, faculty member of the Population Studies Center at the University of Michigan, and professor of sociology at the University of Michigan

== See also ==
- Grand Blanc Township church attack
- The Church of Jesus Christ of Latter-day Saints membership statistics (United States)
- Michigan: Religion
