= Zebedee Coltrin =

American Mormon leader (1804–1887)

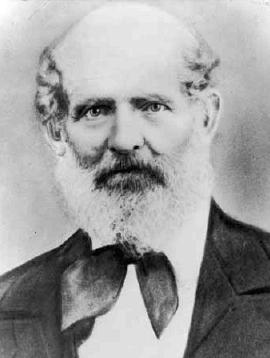

First Seven Presidents of the Seventy
- March 1, 1835 – April 6, 1837
- Called by: Joseph Smith
- End reason: Honorably released because he had already been ordained a high priest

Patriarch
- May 31, 1873 – July 21, 1887
- Called by: Brigham Young
- End reason: Death.

Personal details
- Born: September 7, 1804; Ovid, New York, United States
- Died: July 21, 1887 (aged 82); Spanish Fork, Utah Territory, United States

Zebedee Coltrin (September 7, 1804 – July 21, 1887) was a Mormon pioneer and a general authority in the Church of Jesus Christ of Latter-day Saints from 1835 to 1837. He served in later years as a patriarch in the church, from 1873 until his death.

== Origins in New York and Ohio ==
Coltrin was born—the fifth son of eleven children—to John Coltrin Jr. and Sarah Graham at Ovid, Seneca County, New York. In 1814, his family moved to Strongsville, Ohio, where he grew up on his father's farm.

Four years later, in October 1828, Coltrin married his first wife, Julia Ann Jennings (b. 1812, in Tioga, Pennsylvania), who bore him five children (all of whom died in infancy).

Coltrin had belonged to the Methodist faith before his conversion to Mormonism and had qualified to be a Methodist minister. No evidence exists, however, that Coltrin ever accepted his ministerial duties in the Methodist church.

== Mormon missionary to Missouri and Canada ==
On January 9, 1831, Coltrin was baptized into the Church of Christ by Solomon Hancock at Strongsville, Ohio, and confirmed January 19 by Lyman Wight, who was also a recent convert. In order to be baptized, the ice, which was one foot thick, had to be cut: "It was a cold day, but Zebedee implied that he was warmed with the fervor of his newfound faith. As he stepped out of the frigid water onto the ice, he bore his testimony to those who had come to watch the baptism."

Coltrin was ordained an elder of the church on January 21, 1831, by church historian John Whitmer (one of the Eight Witnesses to the golden plates). Only weeks later, Coltrin was assigned to go to Missouri as a church missionary with Levi W. Hancock (Solomon's brother, who, in addition to being a future witness of the Book of Commandments, would be a fellow President of the Seventy). During travel through Winchester, Indiana, the two elders baptized "upwards of a hundred people".

On July 17, 1832, Coltrin was ordained a high priest by Hyrum Smith and future presiding bishopric and Council of Fifty member Reynolds Cahoon at Kirtland, Ohio (which was then Church headquarters), and in 1834 he served another mission, this time to Upper Canada.

== The School of the Prophets and Kirtland Temple manifestations ==
From January to April 1833, Coltrin participated with a few select Latter Day Saint leaders (referred to as "the first elders of the Church") in the School of the Prophets at Kirtland. The School was a gathering in brotherly fellowship for learning, instruction, and purification—all in preparation for what the Prophet Joseph Smith had promised would be the exquisite, intensely sublime spiritual experiences. As part of the School, Coltrin was one of the elders present when the Word of Wisdom was first revealed to Smith.

Three years later, Coltrin was a regular participant in religious experiences in the upper room of the Kirtland Temple from January through April, an antecedent to the temple's dedication in 1836—which Coltrin years later compared to the "day of Pentecost." Coltrin experienced "cloven tongues as of fire" (or glossolalia) along with fellow participants "as the Spirit gave them utterance ... The angels of God rested upon the Temple and we heard their voices singing heavenly music."

== New Portage blessing and Zion's Camp ==
On April 19, 1834, Joseph Smith, Sidney Rigdon, and Oliver Cowdery gave Coltrin a blessing at New Portage (now Barberton), Ohio, that he would live to see 70 years of age and be blessed with wisdom to preach the gospel.

Also in 1834, Coltrin joined Zion's Camp (contributing financially all he had) and marched with the Smith and more than 200 others—a journey from Ohio to Missouri—for the purpose of assisting and protecting the Missouri Latter Day Saints who had recently been forcibly expelled from Jackson County by mobs. The Camp was divided into twelve companies, and Coltrin was appointed cook for Smith's company. An indicator of the trust Smith had for Coltrin is found in Smith's remark that he would "not eat or drink anything but what Zebedee prepared" for him.

== President of the Quorums of Seventy ==
Coltrin became a member of the First Quorum of the Seventy February 28, 1835, under the hands of Joseph Smith and Oliver Cowdery, who promised him: "You shall have heavenly visions and the ministry of Angels shall be your lot."

The next day, Coltrin was appointed and ordained as one of the first Seven Presidents of the Seventy by Presiding Patriarch of the church Joseph Smith Sr. Sidney Rigdon ordained Coltrin "to all that could be placed upon man upon the earth, and ... that it should ever be [his] desire to preach the Gospel to all the eternities of God."

Two additional quorums of Seventy were organized by the Seven Presidents over the next two years, with Coltrin ordaining and setting apart many of their number, including, on December 20, 1836, in the Kirtland Temple, Elijah Abel—one of the first African Americans originally permitted by Joseph Smith to hold the priesthood. Later, Coltrin stated that in 1834, Joseph Smith had told Coltrin that "the Spirit of the Lord saith the Negro had no right nor cannot hold the Priesthood," and that Abel should be dropped from the Seventies because of his lineage. On April 4, 1837, Coltrin ordained future church president Wilford Woodruff to the Melchizedek priesthood.

When the church hierarchy realized that Coltrin had previously been ordained a high priest, Coltrin was released as one of the Seven Presidents of the Seventy on April 6, 1837.

Coltrin was a charter member of, and owned stock in, the Kirtland Safety Society. When the bank failed, he remained loyal to Joseph Smith, when many others (even those within the highest councils of the Church) apostatized.

== Kirtland Stake Presidency and Smith for President electioneer ==
Coltrin moved to Commerce (renamed shortly thereafter Nauvoo), Illinois, in 1839, but soon returned to Kirtland, Ohio. He was appointed second counselor to Almon W. Babbitt in the Kirtland Stake on May 22, 1841. When the Kirtland Stake was dissolved, he returned to Illinois to help build the Nauvoo Temple and University of Nauvoo. He was received into the Nauvoo high priests' quorum on June 4, 1843.

Coltrin was among the volunteers who, in late June 1843, rescued Joseph Smith from imprisonment in Missouri. Coltrin's continued loyalty brought him appointment to travel east to Michigan to electioneer in Smith's 1844 bid for the Presidency of the United States. It was while stumping for Smith in Michigan that Coltrin learned of the death of Joseph Smith at Carthage Jail.

== Vanguard pioneer and Iowa–Wisconsin missionary ==
Coltrin was a Mormon pioneer and traveled to the Salt Lake Valley in 1847. Prior to leaving for the west, he was endowed in the Nauvoo Temple on December 22, 1845. Coltrin left Nauvoo sometime after March 1846, and by December of that year he was living at Winter Quarters, Nebraska, where, along with his brother Graham, he served as part of Hosea Stout's 30-man police force.

Coltrin was part of Brigham Young's vanguard company of 1847 that first entered the Salt Lake Valley. While en route, Coltrin contracted scurvy due to a lack of fruits and vegetables. Camp clerk Thomas Bullock recorded that former apostle Luke Johnson gave him oil extracted from twelve rattles of a rattlesnake that he'd just killed, which Bullock then rubbed "on Zebedee Coltrin's black leg, which did it a great deal of good".

The vanguard group with Coltrin of three to four wagons entered the Salt Lake valley a few days before the main company with Brigham Young still in the mountains. The vanguards unloaded their wagons near City Creek and went to the Great Salt Lake and began mining the salt, loading it into their wagons with the intent of returning with the salt to Winter Quarters, as salt was much needed and worth its weight in gold.

Within weeks of arriving in the Great Basin, Coltrin was made a "captain of ten" (see D&C 138:3) and returned to Winter Quarters to retrieve his wife and family and also assist other Saints to continue their trek West. For four additional years, Coltrin served in Iowa and Wisconsin as both a missionary and organizer for the Saints' trek West.

== PEF return to Utah and settlement at Spanish Fork ==
With the assistance of the Perpetual Emigration Fund (PEF), Coltrin returned to Salt Lake City with his family in 1851, settling on Main Street near to where the Joseph Smith Memorial Building now stands.

In 1852, responding to a call by Brigham Young, Coltrin sold his home and two city lots (which land-lot properties Young, in August 1847, had allowed the "vanguard" Saints to select for themselves) to settle in Spanish Fork, in Utah Territory's fertile Utah Valley. There, he assisted in the construction of Palmyra, Utah's sturdy Fort Saint Luke for protection against attack by native Timpanogos Ute Indians. During Walker War, Coltrin acted as a lieutenant. Years later, during the Black Hawk War, Coltrin nearly lost his life when an Indian shot a hole through the rim of his hat.

Coltrin helped survey and lay out the town of Spanish Fork and contributed much to its building and municipal improvements over the years. He and his family experienced and survived the locust- and grasshopper-induced Utah famine of 1855–56. Later Coltrin established one of the first grape vineyards in Spanish Fork, as well as a peach orchard. Coltrin served for a time as a city councilman for Spanish Fork.

In his capacity as president of the Utah Stake High Priests' Quorum, Coltrin was a staunch supporter of the United Order organized there and was tireless in his exhortation of baptisms for the dead in temples; he predicted a time "when every stake will have its temple." Coltrin taught that each elder of the church "should continue to contend for the faith that should open unto him the revelations of the heavens". He promised that "if we attend to our duties and the ordinances of God there is thrown around us by the Holy Priesthood a hedge like that around Job which the devil cannot break through".

== Plural marriage and temple blessings ==
Coltrin practiced plural marriage and had seven wives. Coltrin's first marriage to Julia Ann Jennings was a happy one, but she also died at Kirtland in October 1841 at the age of 29. Julia's death was mourned in the Latter Day Saint Times and Seasons newspaper:

She fell asleep in full faith of a glorious resurrection, saying to her husband, as her farewell address: 'Let me go! Let me go! Come Lord Jesus and take me.' Her exit was like the infant dropping to sleep in its mother's arms—Tis sweet to die in Christ.

Coltrin's second wife, Mary Mott (b. 1820, in Bethany, New York), gave birth to ten children. She and Coltrin were married in February 1843, and later, on January 20, 1846, sealed for eternity in the Nauvoo Temple by Brigham Young. Mary also stood as proxy in the sealing of Coltrin to his first wife Julia.

Coltrin would later wed Hannah Husted and Sarah Oyler at Nauvoo (1846), and Lavinia Elizabeth Fullmer (1857) and Marriet Chaddock (1874) at Salt Lake City. Finally, Coltrin married a seventh wife, Amanda Norwood.

== Notable descendents ==
The actor, musician, and adult film director Edward Earle Marsh (1929-2004), who used the stage name Zebedy Colt, was his great grandson.

== Patriarch and apostolic foresight ==
On May 31, 1873, in a meeting presided over by Brigham Young, apostle John Taylor ordained Coltrin to be a church patriarch, a position he held for fourteen years until his death in Spanish Fork at the age of 82. In that ecclesiastical capacity, he traveled widely and pronounced more than one thousand patriarchal blessings upon the heads of Latter-day Saints.

When in early October 1883 John Taylor again organized the School of the Prophets (upon the occasion of its 50th anniversary), Taylor knelt within Salt Lake City's Endowment House on October 12 and washed Coltrin's feet. Coltrin was the only surviving member of the original School of the Prophets at Kirtland. Coltrin then washed Taylor's feet, who then proceeded to wash the feet of his counselors in the First Presidency and of all the Twelve Apostles. The solemn memorial ended with a sharing of the sacramental bread and wine.

Coltrin was a guest of honor at the May 1884 dedication of the Logan Temple in Cache Valley, staying at the home of Bishop Henry Ballard, father of future apostle Melvin J. Ballard and great-grandfather of apostle M. Russell Ballard. During Coltrin's stay, he gave 13-year-old Melvin a patriarchal blessing and blessed him that he would one day be a member of the Quorum of the Twelve Apostles.

Shortly after Melvin Ballard's call to the apostleship, while at a post-conference banquet, apostle George Albert Smith entertained Ballard at his home and commented on the startling coincidence that when he, too, was 13 years old, Coltrin had likewise declared in his patriarchal blessing that George Albert Smith would serve as an apostle.

On May 18, 1884, Coltrin gave the benediction at the Logan Temple's concluding dedicatory services. The final years of his life were spent traveling frequently to Logan to do temple work there.

== Death and celebration ==
Coltrin's funeral, at which apostle Orson F. Whitney spoke, was held on Utah's Pioneer Day, July 24. Coltrin had been Spanish Fork's traditional orator for Mormon pioneer exodus; he had frequently ridden in military escorts in Days of '47 parades. Upon his death, the Deseret News called Coltrin a "respected and venerable man" who left to future generations of Latter-day Saints "an excellent record for faithfulness."

Coltrin's name is listed as one of the original pioneers on Cyrus Dallin's Brigham Young Monument in Temple Square.

Coltrin was buried at Spanish Fork City Cemetery, in Utah County.

The Church of Jesus Christ of Latter-day Saints titles
Preceded by	Member of the First Seven Presidents of the Seventy; 28 February 1835 - 6 April 1837	Succeeded by Salmon Gee
