= James Foster =

James Foster may refer to:

- James Foster (Baptist minister) (1697–1753), English Baptist minister
- James Foster (architect) (c. 1748–1823), English mason and architect in Bristol
- James Foster (cricketer, born 1854) (1854–1914), English cricketer
- James Foster (cricketer, born 1980), English cricketer
- James Foster (economist) (born 1955), American economist, known for Foster–Greer–Thorbecke indices
- James Foster (ice hockey) (1905–1969), Scottish-born Canadian hockey player
- James Foster (ironmaster) (1786–1853), English ironmaster, owner of the Stourbridge Ironworks and various others, and a partner in Foster, Rastrick and Company
- James Foster (Mormon) (1786–1841), early leader in the Latter Day Saint movement
- James C. Foster, chairman and chief executive officer of Charles River Laboratories, Inc.
- James H. Foster (1827–1907), Wisconsin politician
- James W. Foster (died 1932), American politician
- James L. Foster, former Member of the Legislative Assembly of Alberta, 1971–1979
- James Foster, Libertarian candidate in the 2016 Oregon gubernatorial special election

== See also ==
- Jim Foster (disambiguation)
- Jimmy Foster (disambiguation)
