= Joseph Holbrook =

American politician (1806–1885)

Joseph Holbrook (January 16, 1806 – November 14, 1885) was a Mormon pioneer in the U.S. territory of Utah. He was also a county judge and member of the Utah Territorial Legislature.

== Biography ==
Holbrook was born on January 16, 1806, in Florence, New York. Where he was born was later separated into the town of Annsville, New York. His father Moses Holbrook had moved to New York from Massachusetts. Holbrook's father died when he was seven years old, and he then moved to Massachusetts with his grandfather. This was primarily to give him better access to schools. At age 19, he returned to Annisville. Due to his mother having remarried, however, he returned to Massachusetts after a few weeks. He worked as a farm laborer in his grandfather's household for the next two years and then moved to Nassau, New York, where he found work as a farm laborer.

In winter of 1827–28, Holbrook was a school teacher in Annisville for a three-month term. He then returned to Sturbridge, Massachusetts, and worked for a farmer in the general vicinity of where his grandfather lived for a time. In December 1828, he began to work in the lead mines of Sturbridge. He was injured while mining and then returned to farm work, this time for Hezekiah Allen. Allen also had hired a young woman, Nancy Lampson, to help his wife in cheese making, spinning and other household chores. Holbrook fell in love with her, went west to Genesee County, New York, where his mother had moved to and bought a farm in Wethersfield, New York (which would be split off into Wyoming County, New York, in 1841). He then returned to Massachusetts and married Lampson. He became a farmer in Wethersfield in 1830.

In 1832, Holbrook first encountered Mormons. The first messengers of that church he encountered were Evan Greene, a son of John P. Greene, and Lorenzo D. Young, Evan Greene's uncle. They did not have a copy of the Book of Mormon, which Holbrook sought, but he was eventually able to get one from his cousin Mary Ann Angel. He was baptized by Leonard Rich in January 1833.

In April 1833, Holbrook served a mission traveling through parts of New York and then onto Connecticut, Rhode Island, and Massachusetts with his cousin Truman O. Angell. While on this mission they organized a branch in Providence, Rhode Island.

In 1834, Holbrook agreed to join Zion's Camp. He sold his farm in Wethersfield, and relocated his family to Kirtland, and then left them there as he headed west to Missouri. After the completion of Zion's Camp, he took up farming in Clay County, Missouri and then served a mission to eastern Missouri and the region around Quincy, Illinois. His wife and children had come to Missouri sometime late in 1834.

In 1837, Holbrook moved to Caldwell County, Missouri where he settled along Plum Creek about 3 miles west of Far West, Missouri. Besides farming he also worked as a builder there, building an office for Bishop Edward Partridge and also building a schoolhouse as well as several homes. He was also a lieutenant in the county militia.

After the Mormons were driven from Missouri, Holbrook settled for a time in Quincy, Illinois, where he worked at making fence rails. He then was assigned by Joseph Smith to buy corn from the country to the north and east of Quincy, process it, and then distribute it to the Mormon refugees fleeing Missouri. He then served as a counselor in the presidency of the LDS branch at Ramus (now Webster, Illinois). Holbrook organized a company of the Nauvoo Legion in Ramus. In the summer of 1842 at the urging of Anson Call Holbrook moved to Nauvoo, Illinois, shortly after which his wife died. A few months later he married Hannah Flint. She ran a school out of their house in Nauvoo. Holbrook came to Utah in Brigham Young's company of 1848.

Holbrook moved to Bountiful in 1850. From 1851 to 1859, he served as a judge in Davis County, Utah. He was a member of the Utah Territorial Legislature in 1857 and 1859.

He died in Bountiful, Utah Territory.

== See also ==
- List of Zion's Camp participants
