= Evangelist =

Evangelist(s) may refer to:

== Religion ==
- Four Evangelists, the authors of the canonical Christian Gospels
- Evangelism, publicly preaching the Gospel with the intention of spreading the teachings of Jesus Christ
- Evangelist (Anglican Church), a commissioned office in the ministry of many Anglican provinces
- Evangelist, also known as an itinerant preacher in Methodism
- Evangelist, another term for a Revivalist
- Evangelist (Latter Day Saints), an ordained office in the ministry in the Latter Day Saint movement
- Evangelist, a character in John Bunyan's 1678 book The Pilgrim's Progress
- Presiding Patriarch, a church-wide leadership office within the priesthood of Latter Day Saints
- Quorum of Seventy Evangelists, a leadership body in The Church of Jesus Christ (Bickertonite)

== Music ==
- Evangelist (Bach), tenor part in Bach's oratorios and Passions who narrates the Bible
- The narrator in works by other composers, e.g. Heinrich Schütz's Weinachtshistorie, Matthäuspassion, Lukaspassion
- Der Evangelimann, an opera by Austrian composer Wilhelm Kienzl
- The Evangelist (album), an album by Robert Forster

== Other ==
- The Evangelist (1916 film), a silent film directed by Barry O'Neil
- The Evangelist (1924 film), a German silent drama film
- "The Evangelist" (Drop the Dead Donkey), a television episode
- The Evangelist, journal of Walter Scott
- The Evangelists, a 1992 play by Romanian author Alina Mungiu-Pippidi
- The Three Evangelists, a 1995 novel by French author Fred Vargas
- Evangelistas Islets, at the west mouth of the Strait of Magellan
- Technology evangelist, a person who attempts to build support for a given technology

== See also ==
- Evangelical (disambiguation)
- Evangelicalism, a Protestant Christian movement
