= Salmon Gee =

Mormon leader

First Seven Presidents of the Seventy
- April 6, 1837 – May 1838 (aged 45)
- Called by: Joseph Smith, Jr.
- End reason: Released for neglect of duty

Personal details
- Born: October 16, 1792; Lyme, Connecticut, United States
- Died: September 13, 1845 (aged 52); Ambrosia, Iowa, United States

Salmon Gee (October 16, 1792 – September 13, 1845) was an early Mormon leader and member of the Presidency of the Seventy of the Church of Jesus Christ of Latter Day Saints.

Gee was born in Lyme, Connecticut to father, Zopher Gee and mother, Esther Beckwith. He moved to the Ashtabula, Ohio area at age 17. On December 10, 1814, he married Sarah Watson Crane. Together they had ten children. They moved to Geauga County, where Zebedee Coltrin baptized Gee in 1832. Seven months later, Sidney Rigdon ordained him an elder and Joseph Smith, Jr. appointed him leader of the Latter Day Saints in Thompson Township.

On April 6, 1837, Gee was appointed to fill the vacancy in the Presidency of the Seventy left open when Zebedee Coltrin was transferred to the high priest quorum. Sidney Rigdon and Hyrum Smith ordained him a seventy.

The Seventies Quorum removed their fellowship from Gee for "neglect of duty" at a meeting in March 1838, although he was never excommunicated. He was dropped from the quorum that May.

Gee served as a member of the Kirtland High Council from 1841 to 1844, when he moved to Ambrosia, Iowa, where he died in 1845. He was buried in Nauvoo, Illinois. Before he died, he gathered his family together and "exhort[ed] them to faithfulness, advising them also to follow the Church wherever it went."

The church restored Gee's full fellowship in the Quorum of Seventy in 1967.

The Church of Jesus Christ of Latter-day Saints titles
Preceded by Zebedee Coltrin	Member of the First Seven Presidents of the Seventy; April 6, 1837 - March 6, 1838	Succeeded by Zera Pulsipher
