= Roger Orton =

American Latter Day Saint missionary (1799–1851)

First Seven Presidents of the Seventy
- April 7, 1845 – October 6, 1845
- Called by: Brigham Young
- End reason: Released due to inactivity; was never set apart or sustained to position

Personal details
- Born: January 20, 1799; Geneseo, New York, United States
- Died: November 24, 1851 (aged 52); Iowa City, Wright County, Iowa, United States

Roger Orton (January 20, 1799 – November 24, 1851) was an early leader in the Latter Day Saint movement and non-functioning member of the First Seven Presidents of the Seventy.

Orton was born in Geneseo, New York to Roger Orton Sr. and Esther Avery. He married Clarissa Mary Bicknell in 1822, and together they had six children. He joined the church by baptism in about 1833.

== Zion's Camp ==
Orton participated in the 1834 Zion's Camp expedition from Kirtland, Ohio to Clay County, Missouri. He served as a captain of the camp and led a division in a sham battle.

Later, through his negligence, he allowed several horses to run off. Instead of going after them himself, he simply informed the owners of what had happened, expecting them to go after the steeds. The horses turned up about ten miles away. The search for the horses delayed the camp's march by a day and earned Orton a "scathing rebuke" from Joseph Smith, Jr..

After Zion's Camp, in October 1834 Orton left Kirtland with Smith and others on a mission to Pontiac, Michigan. The two divisions of Zion's Camp had originated in Kirtland and Pontiac.

== Kirtland contributions ==
By 1835, Orton was appointed to the high council in Kirtland, and became an original member of the First Quorum of the Seventy. He was also a stockholder in the Kirtland Safety Society, a financial institution established by church leaders.

Orton contributed labor and/or funds to the construction of the Kirtland Temple. While the temple was still under construction its upper floors were already being used for religious meetings. In one such meeting, on January 28, 1836, several in attendance reported experiencing spiritual manifestations. Church history reports Orton experiencing the following:

When the Twelve and the seven presidents were through with their sealing prayer, I called upon President Sidney Rigdon to seal them with uplifted hands; and when he had done this, and cried hosanna, that all the congregation should join him, and shout hosanna to God and the Lamb, and glory to God in the highest. It was done so, and Elder Roger Orton saw a mighty angel riding upon a horse of fire, with a flaming sword in his hand, followed by five others, encircle the house, and protect the Saints, even the Lord's anointed, from the power of Satan and a host of evil spirits, which were striving to disturb the Saints.

== Later life ==
In 1837, Daniel S. Miles presented a complaint against Orton for "abusing Elder Brigham Young, and for a general course of unchristianlike conduct." Orton refused to respond, and he was excommunicated.

Orton remained with the body of the church in Missouri and lost all his property in the 1838 Mormon War. After the 1844 death of Joseph Smith, Orton did not support Young's leadership. He remained in Iowa disappointed with the church leadership and disillusioned with his own decisions that had compromised his family's holdings.

He was restored to the church sometime before April 1845, when he was named one of the Seven Presidents of Seventies. However, Orton, who had become an alcoholic, never showed up to be ordained and never actively served. Considering his case on October 6, 1845, church leaders spoke fondly of him:

Elder George A. Smith remarked that Roger Orton was one of the "Old Camp" and was selected a year ago to be one of the seven Presidents of the Seventy; but he had never received his ordination nor done anything to magnify his calling. It is not to be expected that we shall wait year after year for men to come forward and fill their offices. Brother Orton was one of the Old Camp, and we love him on that account; we always called him the "Big Major", and a first rate man; but he has not come forward since his appointment to magnify his calling.

Ultimately, however, Brigham Young moved that since he hadn't come for one year to be set apart, that the calling should be given to another, and he was dropped from the quorum.

Orton died in Iowa City, Wright County, Iowa on November 24, 1851, at the age of 52.
