= Jared Carter =

Jared Carter may refer to:

- Jared Carter (Latter Day Saints) (1801–1849), an early missionary in the Latter Day Saint movement
- Jared Carter (poet) (born 1939), an American poet
