= Kirtland Camp =

The Kirtland Camp was a migration company made up of several hundred Latter-day Saints that traveled from Kirtland, Ohio to northern Missouri starting in the fall of 1838. Those who stayed with the main company settled in Mormon communities in Daviess County, Missouri during the 1838 Mormon War, and shortly afterwards were forced to evacuate the area due to the conflict.

== Background ==
Within a year of the establishment of the Church of Christ (later the Church of Jesus Christ of Latter-day Saints) by Joseph Smith, Jr. and his followers in New York, Mormon converts were commanded to gather to Kirtland, Ohio, where a sizable community of Mormons had previously been established by Mormon missionaries. By 1835, some 900 Mormon settlers lived in Kirtland with another 200 nearby, making up approximately half of the town's population. Due to internal dissentions within the church and antagonism from non-Mormons in the community, the Kirtland area became increasingly hostile to Latter-day Saints during the latter part of the 1830s. Major Church leaders and faithful Mormon members who could afford to leave evacuated the area and migrated to more promising Mormon settlements in northern Missouri. There were several hundred other Mormons who also wished to leave, but who were too poor to do so. Many of these Mormons came together under leadership of the highest ranking church leaders left in Ohio—Joseph Young, Henry Harriman, Zerah Pulsipher, Josiah Butterfield, James Foster, Elias Smith, and Benjamin Wilber—who were serving as the First Seven Presidents of the Seventy at the time. The seventies began planning the exodus in the Kirtland Temple on 6 March 1838 and extended the opportunity of joining the company to all members of the church in the area shortly afterwards. Despite poverty and ongoing opposition from other community members, the company was organized and departed with over 500 members in June 1838.

== The Journey West ==
The Kirtland Camp traveled nearly 800 miles between Kirtland, Ohio, and Adam-ondi-Ahman, Missouri, from 6 July 1838 to 4 October 1838. Members of the camp covenanted to live by a constitution that provided guidelines regarding the camp's organization and set a code of conduct for its members. The company was divided into four divisions to facilitate oversight of company members.

The company generally traveled along well-established routes, passing from Ohio through Indiana and Illinois into Missouri. As may be expected with a large company, there were a considerable number of delays caused by illness, broken wagons and equipment, river crossings, poor traveling conditions, problems with animals, and food shortages. Groups of company members also occasionally stopped to find temporary work to obtain enough food and money to continue on the journey. Due to these conditions, company members gradually became strung out and dispersed along the path or left the company altogether. The majority of the company stopped for a month to work on a section of road near Dayton, Ohio, to raise money. By the time it reached Springfield, Illinois, there were only 260 members left in the main company.

Despite warnings about deteriorating relations between Mormons and other Missouri inhabitants, the company pushed ahead to their intended destination, arriving at church headquarters in Far West, Missouri on 2 October. From there, they made their way to Adam-ondi-Ahman—the primary Mormon settlement in Daviess County, Missouri—by 4 October. Unfortunately, the company reached Missouri during the 1838 Mormon War. As such, they were only able to settle the region for a few weeks before they were forced to relocate to Far West after Joseph Smith and other Church leaders surrendered in early November. They were forced to leave Missouri altogether on the order of Missouri Governor Lilburn W. Boggs the following February. Other members of the Kirtland Camp who made their way into Missouri behind the main company would become victims of the Haun's Mill massacre on 30 October 1838.

== Legacy ==
The Kirtland Camp represents the earliest attempt at organizing a large company to assist in the migration of Latter-day Saints. It allowed several hundred poor Mormons to travel west to join the main body of the LDS Church and to escape from a hostile environment in Ohio. This company set a precedent for later migrations of Latter-day Saints, such as the evacuation from Missouri that took place in 1839 and the more famous migrations from Illinois to Utah. B. H. Roberts—a notable historian of Mormonism and a general authority in LDS Church at the turn of the twentieth century—also noted that this company was "perhaps the greatest work achieved by the First Council of the Seventies, in their organized capacity" during the early days of the LDS Church.
