= Lyman R. Sherman =

Mormon leader

First Seven Presidents of the Seventy
- March 1, 1835 – April 6, 1837
- Called by: Joseph Smith
- End reason: Honorably released because he had already been ordained a high priest

Personal details
- Born: Lyman Royal Sherman; May 22, 1804; Monkton, Vermont, United States
- Died: January or February 1839 (aged 34); Far West, Missouri, United States

Lyman Royal Sherman (22 May 1804 – January or February 1839) was an early leader in the Latter Day Saint movement, an inaugural member of the Seven Presidents of the Seventy, and was called to the Quorum of the Twelve Apostles but died before being informed and ordained.

== Biography ==
Sherman was born in Monkton, Vermont to Elkanah Sherman and Asenath Hulbert. In 1832, he joined the Church of Jesus Christ of Latter-Day Saints and in 1834 was part of Zion's Camp.

On January 16, 1839, Joseph Smith, along with Sidney Rigdon and Hyrum Smith, wrote Brigham Young and Heber C. Kimball to call Sherman and George A. Smith to replace Thomas B. Marsh and Orson Hyde, respectively, in the Quorum of the Twelve. The next month, on February 23, Kimball noted that George A. Smith was indeed added to the quorum, but Sherman died shortly after Joseph Smith wrote the letter. Kimball concluded that it was not the will of God for a man to take Hyde's place in the quorum.

On the west side of the Latter Day Saints' temple in Kirtland stood a printing office. Some dissenters of the church were planning to use the printing office—which had that day been sold in auction to critic Nathaniel Milliken—to publish materials critical of Joseph Smith. Shortly after this plan became known, the printing office was destroyed by fire on the evening of January 15, 1838. Warren Parrish deemed Smith and Rigdon to be culpable for ordering the burning, while Smith blamed the incident on the "Parrishites"—a faction bearing the name of Parrish, which emerged in response to the failure of the Kirtland Safety Society. Benjamin F. Johnson, a prominent early Mormon, recounted that Sherman was the one who burned the press in anticipation of the dissenters' plan. Although the printing office was successfully destroyed, favorable winds saved the nearby temple from catching fire.

A section of the Doctrine and Covenants is a revelation received by Smith in response to a query from Sherman about the Lord's will for him.

Sherman died in January or February 1839, in Far West, Missouri. His widow, Delcena Didamia Johnson, married Joseph Smith by July 1842.
