= Elijah Fordham =

American missionary (1798–1879)

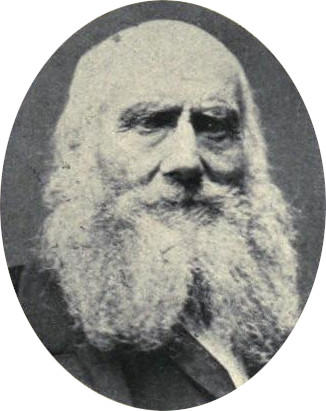
- Born: March 8, 1798; New York City
- Died: September 9, 1879 (aged 81); Wellsville, Utah
- Known for: Carpenter who helped build Kirtland and Nauvoo temples

Elijah Fordham (March 8, 1798 – September 9, 1879) was an early member of the Latter Day Saint movement, most well known for having been miraculously healed by Joseph Smith in 1839.

Fordham was born New York City to George Fordham and Mary Baker and married Jane Ann Fisher November 23, 1822. On April 12, 1830 he married Bathiah Fisher.

Fordham joined the Church of the Latter Day Saints in May 1834 in Pontiac, Michigan Territory. On one occasion, he was speaking in tongues and two Frenchmen happened to be passing by the meeting and were amazed to hear someone speaking French. Fordham served as the historian of the section of Zion's Camp that left from Pontiac, Michigan. He later assisted in the building of the Kirtland Temple.

Ordained an elder and seventy in 1837, Fordham was ordained a high priest on January 22, 1837. Later in 1837, he assisted Parley P. Pratt in organizing the first branch of the church in New York City. He married for the third time when he took Anna Bibbins Chaffee to wife in Ashford, Connecticut on October 3, 1838.

Fordham was healed from the ague by the administration of Joseph Smith at Montrose, Iowa in 1839. Fordham later served on the high council of the stake in Iowa. After this, Fordham moved to Nauvoo where he was a member of the Nauvoo Legion and assisted in building the Nauvoo Temple. For the temple, Fordham carved the oxen to hold up the baptismal font of the temple. Fordham served as one of the firewardens of Nauvoo.

Fordham served another mission in 1843 to Knox County, Illinois. In 1844, Fordham was among the missionaries who were sent with at least one assigned to every congressional district.

Fordham came to Utah Territory in Edward Hunter's 1850 pioneer company.

Fordham died in Wellsville, Utah.
