= Jimmy Foster =

Jimmy Foster may refer to:

- Jimmy Foster (basketball) (born 1951), retired American basketball player
- Jimmy Foster (racing driver) (born 1977), former NASCAR driver
- James Foster (ice hockey) (1905–1969), often known as Jimmy, Scottish-born Canadian ice hockey goaltender

== See also ==
- James Foster (disambiguation)
- Jim Foster (disambiguation)
