= Leonard Rich =

American Mormon leader

First Seven Presidents of the Seventy
- March 1, 1835 – April 6, 1837
- Called by: Joseph Smith
- End reason: Honorably released because he had already been ordained a high priest

Personal details
- Born: 1800; Connecticut, United States
- Died: 1868 (aged 67–68); Kirtland, Ohio, United States

Leonard Rich (1800–1868) was an early leader in the Latter Day Saint movement and one of the inaugural seven Presidents of the Seventy.

Rich was born in Connecticut in 1800 and was a farmer. He was married to Kezia Rich (1805–1853) and they had four children. In 1833, he baptized Truman Angell, future architect of the Salt Lake Temple. In 1834, the Kirtland High Council rebuked him for "transgressing the word of wisdom and for selling the revelations [scriptures] at an extortionary price." That same year he was part of Zion's Camp.

In January 1837, Rich signed the new constitution of the Kirtland Safety Society. On April 6 of that year, he and other presidents of the Seventy who were ordained high priests prior to their call were released. That fall, he dissented from the church and in December the church excommunicated him.

Rich remained a resident of Kirtland for the rest of his life. In 1845, Reuben McBride reported that Rich was a leader of rioters who broke into and took possession of the Kirtland Temple. In January 1847 Rich, along with William E. McLellin and Jacob Bump, organized the Church of Christ at Kirtland.

Rich's first wife died in 1853 and he married Marina Bassett at Kirtland March 7, 1858. He died in Kirtland in 1868.
