= Detroit Michigan Temple =

LDS Church temple in Detroit, Michigan, U.S.

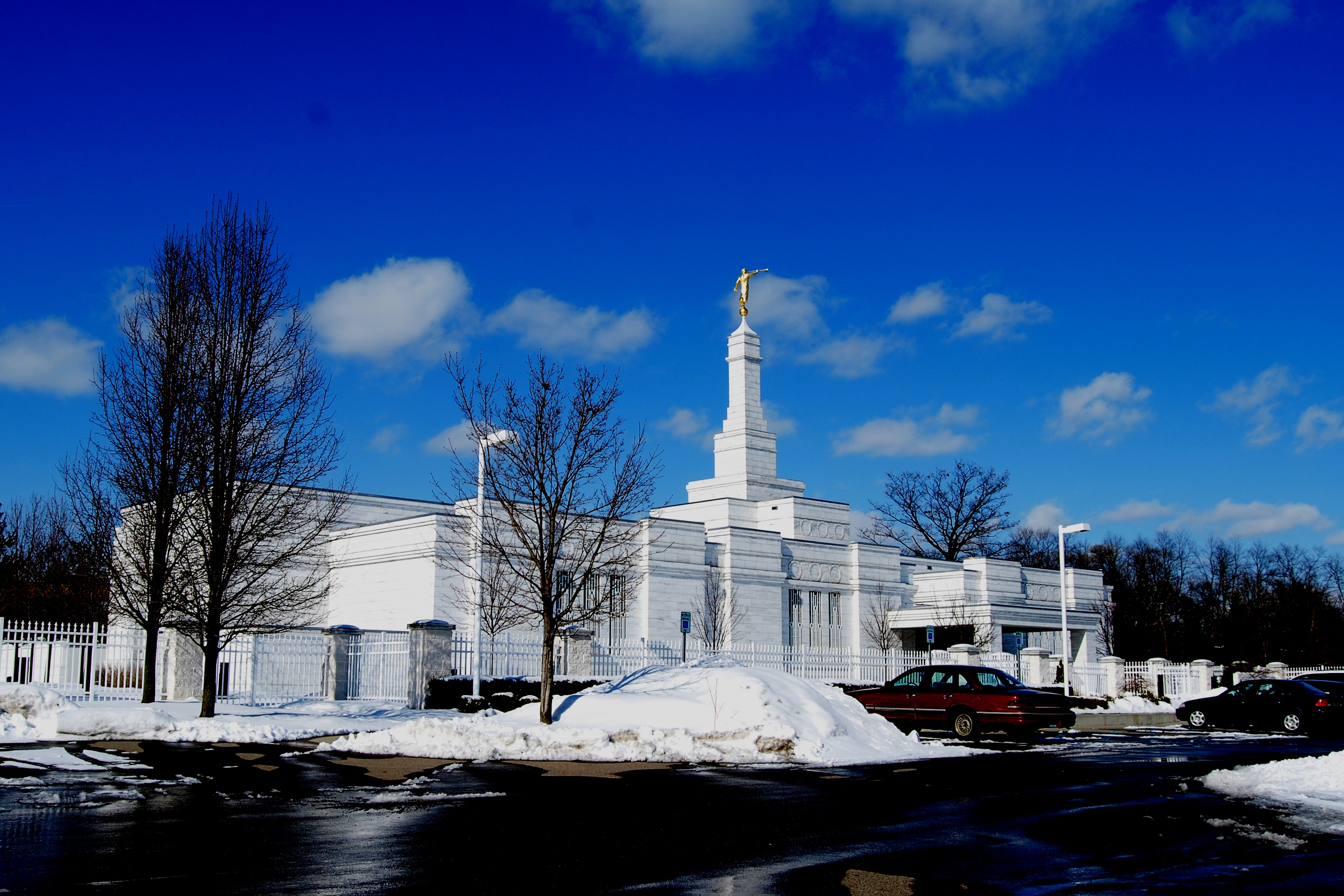
- Interactive map of Detroit Michigan Temple
- Number: 63
- Dedication: October 23, 1999, by Gordon B. Hinckley
- Site: 6.34 acres (2.57 ha)
- Floor area: 10,700 ft^{2} (990 m^{2})
- Height: 71 ft (22 m)
- Official website • News & images

Church chronology
← Columbia South Carolina Temple	Detroit Michigan Temple	→ Halifax Nova Scotia Temple

Additional information
- Announced: August 10, 1998, by Gordon B. Hinckley
- Groundbreaking: October 10, 1998, by Jay E. Jensen
- Open house: October 8–16, 1999
- Current president: David Peter Jensen
- Designed by: John Coakley, Sr.
- Location: Bloomfield Hills, Michigan, United States
- Coordinates: 42°33′58.55759″N 83°13′47.93880″W
- Exterior finish: Imperial Danby White marble quarried in Vermont
- Design: Classic modern, single-spire design
- Baptistries: 1
- Ordinance rooms: 2 (two-stage progressive)
- Sealing rooms: 2

The Detroit Michigan Temple is the 63rd operating temple of the Church of Jesus Christ of Latter-day Saints, and is located in Bloomfield Hills, Michigan, a suburb of Detroit. The intent to build the temple was announced on August 10, 1998, by the church's First Presidency. It was the first temple constructed in Michigan.

A groundbreaking ceremony was held on October 10, 1998, presided over by Jay E. Jensen, a church general authority. It was held the same day as the Spokane Washington Temple's groundbreaking, the first time in church history that two temple groundbreakings occurred the same day. After construction was completed, approximately 30,000 visitors toured the temple during a public open house held from October 6 to October 15, 1999. Church president Gordon B. Hinckley dedicated the temple on October 23, 1999, in six sessions.

The 10,700-square-foot building is on a 3.1-acre site next to one of the church's meetinghouses. The single-story building's exterior has Imperial Danby White marble, and a central spire with a statue of the angel Moroni at the top. The interior includes two ordinance rooms, two sealing rooms, and a baptistry.

== History ==
The Detroit Michigan Temple was announced by the First Presidency on August 10, 1998. The estimated $5 million structure was the church's first temple built in Michigan., constructed on a 3.1-acre (1.25 ha) property located at 37425 Woodward Avenue in Bloomfield Hills, Michigan, adjacent to an existing stake center. Preliminary plans called for a single-story structure of more than 10,700 square feet.

The site has historical connections to other parts of church history, as Stephen Mack, Joseph Smith's uncle, surveyed the first road through what became Detroit, which, according to Gordon B. Hinckley, is believed to be the current Woodward Avenue. Due to this, it was likely Smith traveled past the temple site.

The land for the temple was originally bought to provide land for a stake center (which normally occupies 4-5 acres), but the land purchased had more than the usual size of square footage. The stake center was dedicated in 1957 by church president David O. McKay. The first stake president, George W. Romney, felt strongly not to sell the property. When the church came to look for a site, they felt that the site with the stake center seemed to be the right location. The site had been weeded and landscaped with trees and grass until the time the temple was built on the grounds.

In 2020, like all the church's others, the Detroit Michigan Temple was closed for a time in response to the COVID-19 pandemic.

The temple serves church members in the Lower Peninsula of Michigan, northwest Ohio and the church's London Ontario Stake, which includes the border towns of Sarnia and Windsor in Ontario. Sault Ste. Marie, Michigan and the eastern third of the Upper Peninsula is also in the temple district. As of 2022, Southwest Michigan around Benton Harbor, Kalamazoo, Battle Creek, and Niles are assigned to the Chicago Illinois Temple.

== Construction ==
A groundbreaking ceremony occurred on October 10, 1998, marking the commencement of construction. This ceremony was presided over by Jay E. Jensen, a member of the First Quorum of the Seventy and president of the church's North America Northeast Area, with more than 1,000 people attending. The groundbreaking occurred on the same day as the Spokane Washington Temple, the first time in church history that two temple groundbreakings occurred the same day. At the ceremony, W.E. Barry Mayo referenced the Old Testament prophet Elijah, describing him as a miracle worker whose contributions were underappreciated in his lifetime. Citing Jewish traditions that anticipate Elijah's return, Mayo stated, “Close the door, put away the chair. Elijah has already come.” He also acknowledged the mayor of Bloomfield Hills, who was present at the ceremony.

Following construction, a public open house began October 6, 1999, and lasted 10 days, with approximately 30,000 people visiting the temple. Special tours were conducted for state and local media, as well as government, religious, and educational leaders. During the open house, two unspecified government officials referenced the angel Moroni statue, and said that they were grateful to have an angel watching over the city.

The Detroit Michigan Temple was dedicated on October 23, 1999, by Gordon B. Hinckley. The dedication included six sessions held over two days, with Hinckley accompanied by his wife, Marjorie, with Henry B. Eyring of the Quorum of the Twelve Apostles and his wife, Kathleen, along with Jay E. Jensen, president of the North America Northeast Area, and his wife, Lona Lee, also attending.

== Design and architecture ==
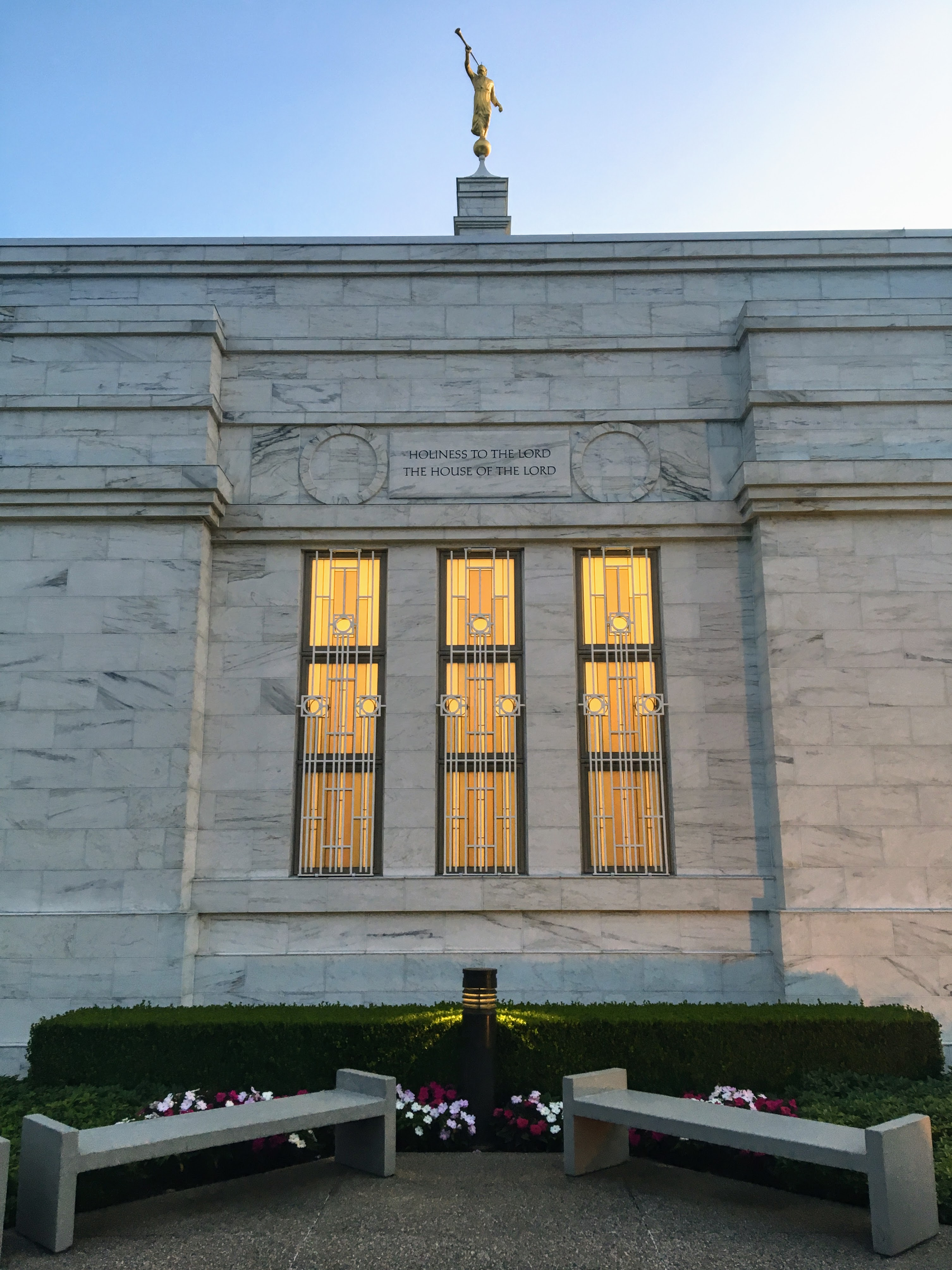
Detroit Michigan Temple

The temple is a single-story, with Imperial Danby White marble, which was sourced from Vermont, on the exterior. It has a central spire with a gold-leafed statue of the angel Moroni, and is on a 3.1-acre plot in Bloomfield Hills, Michigan, near an adjacent stake center. The landscaping features a variety of shrubbery and trees. It includes two ordinance rooms, two sealing rooms, and a baptistry.

== Temple presidents and admittance ==
=== Temple presidents ===
The church's temples are directed by a temple president and matron, each typically serving for a term of three years. The president and matron oversee the administration of temple operations and provide guidance and training for both temple patrons and staff.

Serving from 1999 to 2004, Cyrus J. Webber Jr. was the first president, with Donna M. Webber serving as matron. As of 2023, Brent R. Jensen is the president, with Carolyn W. Jensen serving as matron.

=== Admittance ===
On August 10, 1998, the church announced the public open house that began on October 6 and ran for ten days (excluding Sundays). The temple was dedicated by Gordon B. Hinckley on October 23, 1999, in six sessions over two days.

Like all the church's temples, it is not used for Sunday worship services. To members of the church, temples are regarded as sacred houses of the Lord. Once dedicated, only church members with a current temple recommend can enter for worship.

== See also ==
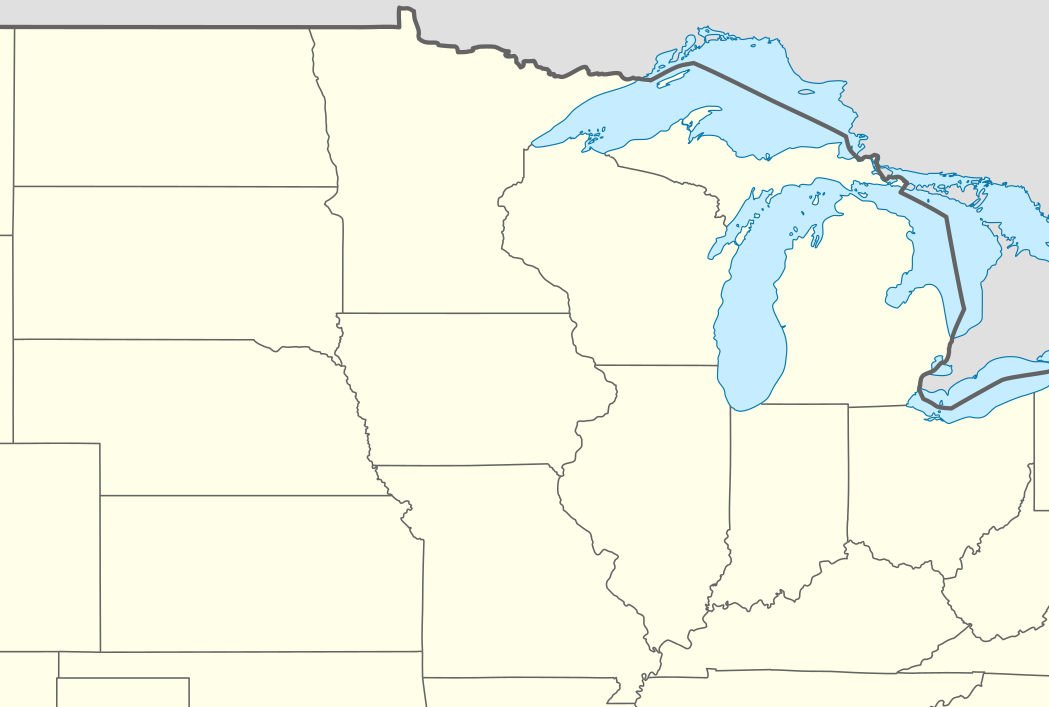
Temples in the United States Midwest
- = Operating
- = Under construction
- = Announced
- = Closed for renovation
- Comparison of temples of The Church of Jesus Christ of Latter-day Saints
- List of temples of The Church of Jesus Christ of Latter-day Saints
- List of temples of The Church of Jesus Christ of Latter-day Saints by geographic region
- Temple architecture (Latter-day Saints)
- The Church of Jesus Christ of Latter-day Saints in Michigan

== Additional reading ==
- "First Presidency announces temples for Spokane, Detroit", Church News, August 29, 1998
- "Ground broken for two new temples", Church News, October 17, 1998
- Cady, Jeanne (July 17, 1999), "Angel Moroni statue tops Detroit temple", Church News
- Michalek, Patricia (October 23, 1999), "Detroit open house visitors feel 'serenity of the temple'", Church News
- Hill, Greg (October 30, 1999), "'A temple in their midst'", Church News
