= Presiding high council =

Latter Day Saint churches supervisory boards

In the Latter Day Saint movement, there are two presiding high councils, one said to be "standing," and the other "traveling." The traveling high council is generally known as the Quorum of Twelve Apostles. Both councils, at least in theory, preside over the church, although the apostles have tended to supersede the standing high council in both of the largest Latter Day Saint denominations, The Church of Jesus Christ of Latter-day Saints and the Community of Christ.

Both presiding high councils function as second presidencies to the church, the apostles overseeing the mission field, and the standing high council overseeing the stakes of Zion (or areas where the church has been organized into sustained units).

Historically, the standing high council had oversight over all other high councils within the stakes of Zion and was equal in authority to the Quorum of the Twelve. Because the standing high council oversaw stake high councils, the Quorum of the Twelve had oversight over the Seventy.

== Types of high councils ==
In the revelations of Joseph Smith, at least three types of high council are mentioned:

- Stake high councils, with standing or authority in only one particular stake;
- a standing presiding high council, also called the High Council in Zion or the High Council of Zion, with jurisdiction over all the stakes of Zion; and
- a traveling presiding high council, later called the Quorum of the Twelve Apostles, with jurisdiction over the mission field outside of the established stakes.

The standing presiding high council was intended to be located at the "center place" of Zion, or church headquarters. The center place itself is not considered a stake. Building upon the Book of Isaiah's imagery of Zion as a tent (Isaiah 54:2), the church leadership is found at the center pole of the tent, with the stakes of Zion providing support and balance to the center place.

The standing presiding high council in Zion acts with the First Presidency as a second presidency to the church. The traveling presiding high council acts to govern the church outside of the organized stakes. One of Smith's revelations states that "the high council in Zion form a quorum equal in authority in the affairs of the church, in all their decisions, to the councils of the Twelve at the stakes of Zion."

The two presiding high councils, when combined, are equal in authority to the First Presidency. At the same time, both are subject to the First Presidency, which has undivided authority over all the church.

In addition to these two presiding councils, each of the several standing high councils in the stakes of Zion, when combined, are deemed to be equal in authority to standing high council in Zion. As such, the combined stake high councils potentially form a third-tier presidency of the church.

== History ==
On February 17, 1834, Joseph Smith, the founder of the Latter Day Saint movement, created the church's first high council at church headquarters in Kirtland, Ohio. This body consisted of twelve men and were under the direction of the First Presidency. This high council took on the role of chief judicial and legislative body of the church, except in areas where the church was not organized, and handled such things as excommunication trials and approval of all church spending. When church headquarters moved to Jackson County, Missouri, the newly formed Missouri high council took on a presiding role as the high council of Zion, and the Kirtland high council became subordinate. Later, when other high councils were established in newly formed stakes of the church, the high council of Zion took on the role of "presiding" over the lesser high councils. For example, cases tried in the high councils of outlying stakes were regularly appealed to the presiding high council. The president of this high council was the President of the Church, who at all relevant times was Smith.

Originally, the standing high council, under the direction of the First Presidency, was in a de facto supervisory role over the Quorum of the Twelve Apostles, which was a traveling high council with jurisdiction only outside of Zion or its stakes. For example, in 1838, when vacancies arose in the traveling high council, it was the standing high council at Far West, Missouri, that voted on and filled the vacancies. Later, as the traveling high council evolved and began to be known as the Quorum of the Twelve Apostles, it acquired equal status with the standing high council. When the standing high council was dissolved after church members were expelled from Missouri, the high council organized at the new church headquarters in Nauvoo, Illinois, where it continued to function as the presiding high council of the church, overseeing appeals from high councils in outlying stakes.

The original members of the standing high council in Kirtland were:

- Joseph Smith, Sr.
- John Smith
- Joseph Coe
- John Johnson
- Martin Harris
- John S. Carter
- Jared Carter
- Oliver Cowdery
- Samuel H. Smith
- Orson Hyde
- Sylvester Smith
- Luke S. Johnson

== History in The Church of Jesus Christ of Latter-day Saints ==
In 1841, still during Smith's lifetime, the role of Traveling Presiding High Council of the Quorum of the Twelve Apostles was elevated, apparently above that of the Standing Presiding High Council. Meanwhile, after the 1844 succession crisis, high councils developed differently in the various denominations of the Latter Day Saint movement, with its role often decreasing. In The Church of Jesus Christ of Latter-day Saints, which was composed of those who recognized Brigham Young and the apostles as the rightful successor to Smith, the Quorum of the Twelve Apostles gained ascendancy and the standing high council diminished in authority, eventually disappearing completely. Post-exodus to Utah, the standing high council was established in a limited capacity as part of the central Salt Lake Stake, but it only served as a ratifying body for priesthood quorums in other stakes. An LDS Church Sunday School manual from 1980 states: “The Salt Lake Stake functioned more or less as a center stake that gave direction and guidance and had jurisdiction over other stakes. When quorum leaders in outlying areas needed new officers they sent a list of nominees to the Salt Lake Stake.” Of this arrangement, the manual states that “the function of stake organizations … had not been adequately defined for the maximum strength of the overall Church organization.”

Toward the end of his life, Brigham Young began an extensive reformation of the various priesthood quorums, standardizing their jurisdiction and function. Minutes from an October 19, 1876 Bishops Meeting quote Young as saying, "So with the High Councils, their jurisdiction extends only to the Stakes in which they are organized. Some have entertained the idea that the High Council in this Stake of Zion had jurisdiction over all other stakes. This is not so. The High Council of Weber Co[unty], or of any other stake would have just as much right to call in question the decisions of the High Council of this Stake of Zion, as this High council theirs, both are equal in authority."

In 1877, the First Presidency, with Brigham Young as President, sent out a letter to the church for the purpose of "setting in order the quorums of priesthood"; regarding the situation of the Salt Lake Stake having a "center place" supervisory role, the letter stated that “under the direction of the First Presidency and the Twelve Apostles the presidency of the various Stakes will have the general supervision of all matters pertaining to the church within the limits of their Stakes." With that, any remaining vestiges of a separate standing presiding high council within the LDS Church disappeared, its role subsumed into the functions of the First Presidency and Quorum of the Twelve Apostles.

== History in the Community of Christ ==
Community of Christ, formerly known as the Reorganized Church of Jesus Christ of Latter Day Saints (RLDS Church), has a functioning standing high council. Composed of twelve members, it retains some (but not all) of the duties detailed in Smith's original priesthood structure. One major difference is that its members are not general officers that are equal to the Council of Twelve Apostles. As such, the standing high council is separate from the World Church Leadership Council. The high council does, however, function in an advisory role for the First Presidency. Its decisions may be overturned only through action of a World Conference. Major advisory decisions include its 1982 statement on homosexuality.

The Church Administrator's Handbook 2005 states:

The Standing High Council meets at the request of the First Presidency to consider questions of moral and ethical significance, to provide general advice and counsel to the First Presidency, and to consider appeals from courts of field jurisdictions. The Standing High Council may also advice the Presiding Bishopric when requested by the First Presidency.

The members of the Standing High Council as of 2012 were:

- William M. Barnhard
- Gwendolyn Hawks-Blue
- Kent G. Bradford
- Sharon M. Kirkpatrick
- Valerie K. Brennan
- Marilee A. Martens
- David M. Byrn
- Scott A. Roberson
- Dennis R. Clinefelter
- Kathy D. Robinson
- Matthew J. Frizzell
- Patricia K. Trachsel
