= Darwin Richardson =

Darwin Charles Richardson (June 29, 1812 – November 13, 1860) was an early convert to the Latter Day Saint movement, a Mormon pioneer, and was among the first Mormon missionaries to preach on the island of Jamaica.

Richardson was born in Lisbon, New Hampshire. Little is known of his life prior to his becoming a Latter Day Saint follower of Joseph Smith sometime before 1834. In 1834, he was a member of Zion's Camp that traveled from Ohio to Missouri in an attempt to assist Latter Day Saints there.

In 1835, Richardson became an inaugural member of the First Quorum of Seventy.

In January 1853, Richardson and three other Mormon missionaries arrived in Jamaica with the intent of preaching Mormonism throughout the West Indies. However, while they were visiting the American consul, a crowd of around 150 people surrounded the building and threatened violence if the "polygamists" were permitted to preach in Jamaica. Richardson and his companions left the island, but not before two of them had been shot at.

Richardson traveled to England to preach instead, and he returned to America in 1854 with over 2000 English converts. Richardson served as a captain of a company of Mormon pioneers that traveled across the United States to Utah Territory in 1854.

Richardson died in Salt Lake City, Utah Territory.
