= Hebron, Utah =

Hebron
- Ghost town
- Location within Utah Location within the United States
- Coordinates: 37°34′36″N 113°49′11″W
- Country: United States
- State: Utah
- County: Washington
- Settled: 1862
- Abandoned: 1902
- Named for: Hebron
- Elevation: 5,476 ft (1,669 m)
- GNIS feature ID: 1455698

Hebron is a ghost town on Shoal Creek in Washington County in southwestern Utah, United States. Hebron was inhabited from 1862 until 1902, when the already-declining town was mostly destroyed by an earthquake. The present-day city of Enterprise, 6 miles (9.7 km) to the east, was settled largely by people leaving Hebron.

== History ==
=== Foundation ===
This area was explored in 1862 by a group of men led by John and Charles Pulsipher, who were herding livestock owned by the Church of Jesus Christ of Latter-day Saints. They drove the cattle from the St. George area as far north as Mountain Meadows, then explored much of the land lying south of the Escalante Desert. They were favorably impressed with the Shoal Creek area and decided it would be a good place to settle with their families. Encouraged by the local Paiutes, the pioneers brought their families and organized a ranching community called Shoal Creek. The Pulsiphers' father, prominent LDS leader Zera Pulsipher, moved here in the fall of 1862 and became the local presiding church officer.

A small fort was built here in 1866, when the outbreak of the Black Hawk War caused widespread fear of Indian attacks. The larger community of Clover Valley, located in the Clover Valley of present-day Nevada, was evacuated and its residents moved to the Shoal Creek fort. Gardens and fodder grew well, and the settlement began to thrive. It became an important source of supplies for the silver mining camps of eastern Nevada, particularly Pioche, and later for nearby Silver Reef, Utah. In 1867 a schoolhouse was built.

In 1868, LDS Apostle Erastus Snow came to form a congregation. The population was 75. Snow directed the surveying of a formal townsite, which John Pulsipher named for the biblical Hebron. Shoal Creek had been a scattered, loosely organized settlement, but Hebron became a fast-growing town. Soon it had a hotel, several stores, freight offices, and in 1872 a telegraph office.

=== Decline ===
Historical population
Census	Pop.	Note	%±
1870	111		—
1880	110		−0.9%
1890	79		−28.2%
1900	100		26.6%

In common with other early settlements of Utah's Dixie, Hebron's greatest obstacles had to do with water. Originally planned as a ranching community, it lacked sufficient water for the irrigation of substantial farms. A wooden flume was built to bring water from a nearby spring to water Hebron's farms, but it collapsed due to excessively wet weather in 1885. One of the former Clover Valley farmers named Orson Huntsman proposed to build a large reservoir on Shoal Creek, but the plan was controversial and received little support from his neighbors. In 1891, Huntsman had a 320-acre (130 ha) townsite surveyed below the proposed reservoir site, then filed a desert land entry on the land, which he called Enterprise. After some three years of seeking investors, he organized a formal company to construct the reservoir in 1893. Hebron's leaders responded by building a new, longer aqueduct with additional dams, ditches, and roads. They tried to keep water and residents from flowing from Hebron to Enterprise, but families began to move where the farming prospects were better.

=== Destruction ===
On November 17, 1902, Hebron was severely damaged by an earthquake centered at Pine Valley, with an estimated magnitude of 6 and an intensity of VIII. Most of the rock homes in Hebron were irreparably ruined, and the exodus to Enterprise accelerated. The rest of Hebron's residents moved, selling their water rights to the Enterprise Reservoir Company. In 1904, what was left of the town of Hebron sold all remaining water rights. The departing residents tore down the damaged buildings for the materials, leaving only rubble and a small cemetery.
