= Jim Foster =

Jim Foster may refer to:

- Jim Foster (American football), creator of arena football
- Jim Foster (activist) (1934–1990), LGBT rights and Democratic activist
- Jim Foster (basketball) (born 1948), women's college basketball coach
- Jim Foster (musician) (born 1950), Canadian musician
- Jim Foster (baseball) (born 1971), American baseball coach

== See also ==
- Jimmy Foster (disambiguation)
- James Foster (disambiguation)
