= Jacob Gates =

American politician

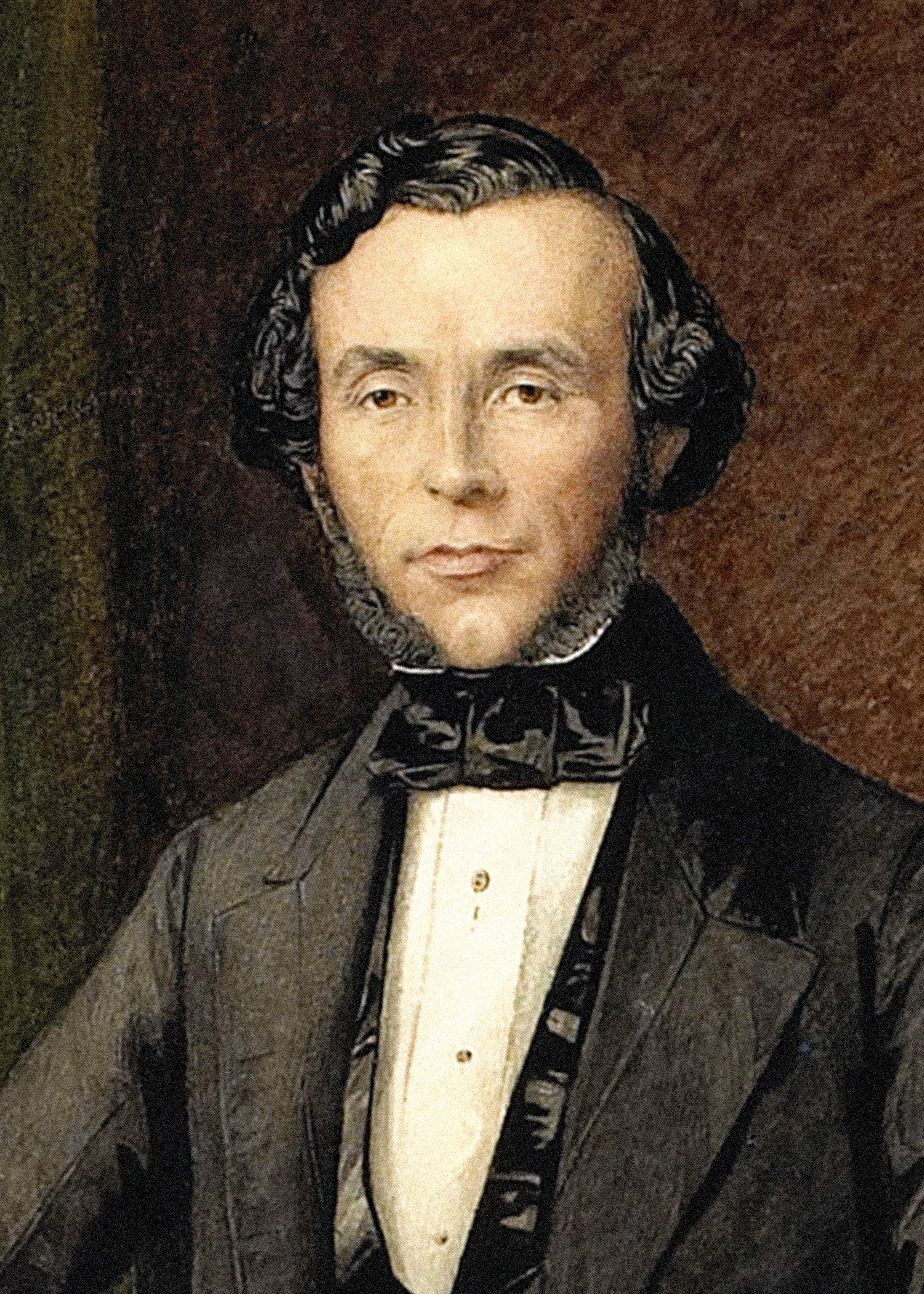

First Seven Presidents of the Seventy
- April 6, 1860 – April 14, 1892
- Called by: Brigham Young

Personal details
- Born: March 9, 1811; St. Johnsbury, Vermont, United States
- Died: April 14, 1892 (aged 80); Provo, Utah Territory, United States

Jacob Gates (March 9, 1811 – April 14, 1892) was an early Mormon leader and member of the First Seven Presidents of the Seventy of the Church of Jesus Christ of Latter-day Saints. Gates was born in St. Johnsbury, Vermont and married Mary Snow in 1833. That same year, Orson Pratt baptized him. In 1834, the couple moved near Liberty, Missouri. In late 1836, they moved to Caldwell County, Missouri. He served six separate missions over the course of his life:

1. First Midwestern mission (January 1836 – June 1836)
2. Mission to Canada (May 1839 – Oct 1839)
3. Second Midwestern mission (July 1841 – October 1841)
4. Mission to New England (June 1843 – May 1844)
5. First mission to England (February 1850 – March 1853)
6. Second mission to England (September 1859 – August 1861)

In October 1844, he was made president of the fourth quorum of Seventy.

In 1849, Gates met with Oliver Cowdery shortly before Cowdery died. During their conversation, Cowdery said,

Jacob, I want you to remember what I say to you. I am a dying man, and what would it profit me to tell you a lie? I know,' said he, 'that this Book of Mormon was translated by the gift and power of God. My eyes saw, my ears heard, and my understanding was touched, and I know that whereof I testified is true. It was no dream, no vain imagination of the mind-it was real.

While in Liverpool, England, on a mission in 1859, Brigham Young wrote Gates to inform him he'd been called as one of the seven presidents of the Seventy. He was ordained in 1862, though he was sustained by the church on April 6, 1860. Following the death of Henry Harriman, Gates was the senior president of the Seventy from May 1891 until his own death in April 1892.

Gates served in the Utah Territorial Legislature, representing Washington and Kane counties, from 1864 to 1867. Gates practiced plural marriage and fathered 11 children. He died in Provo, Utah Territory.
