= Zera Pulsipher =

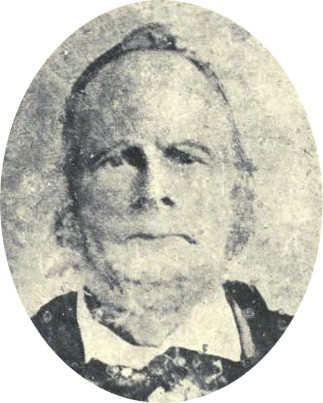

First Seven Presidents of the Seventy
- March 6, 1838 – April 12, 1862
- Called by: Joseph Smith
- End reason: Released for performing unauthorized plural marriages

Personal details
- Born: June 24, 1789; Rockingham, Vermont Republic
- Died: January 1, 1872 (aged 82); Hebron, Utah Territory, United States
- Signature
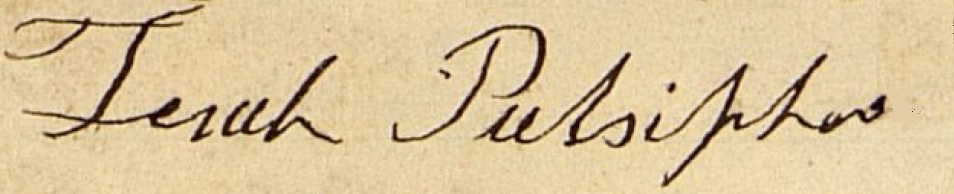

Zera Pulsipher (also Zerah) (June 24, 1789 – January 1, 1872) was an American religious leader who was an early convert to the Church of Jesus Christ of Latter-day Saints. He was one of the seven presidents to oversee the group known as the Seventy between 1838 and 1862. In that capacity, he provided leadership to the early Mormon community, most notably in the exodus of the Kirtland Camp. He was also an active missionary who baptized Wilford Woodruff into the church. While historical records use both spellings of his first name, Pulsipher most frequently used "Zerah" in his own handwritten documents, reflecting the most common spelling in the King James Version.

== Ancestry and youth ==
Pulsipher was born in Rockingham, Vermont, to John and Elizabeth Pulsipher. He came from a heritage of New England settlers and patriots, including a father and grandfather who fought in the Battle of Bunker Hill. He spent much of his childhood working on his parents’ farm. During his early twenties, Pulsipher attempted to study medicine, but returned to farming. He married Mary Randall in 1810, and they had a daughter together. Mary died after a year of being married. Pulsipher married Mary Brown in 1815, and they raised a large family together.

== Religious experience ==
A Free Will Baptist and a religious "seeker" looking for a restoration of primitive Christianity, Pulsipher was introduced to the Latter Day Saint church in Onondaga County, New York. After hearing missionary Jared Carter preach, Pulsipher reported experiencing a vision while threshing grain in his barn, where he saw a bright light and angels holding the Book of Mormon. Motivated by this experience, he was baptized on January 11, 1832. For the next two years, Pulsipher presided over his local branch and served missions, notably baptizing future church president Wilford Woodruff.

In 1835, the Pulsiphers moved to church headquarters in Kirtland, Ohio, where Pulsipher was ordained as a First President of the Seventy on March 6, 1838, replacing Salmon Gee. After high-ranking leaders fled Kirtland, Pulsipher and the other Presidents of the Seventy organized the Kirtland Camp to lead over 500 impoverished members to Far West, Missouri, the new church headquarters. During the grueling trek, Pulsipher acted as a strict administrator who heavily enforced the camp's constitution and relied on his spiritual authority to guide the group through illness and external hostility.

Following the church to Nauvoo, Illinois, Pulsipher worked on the construction of the Nauvoo Temple, where he received his endowment. During the 1844 succession crisis following Joseph Smith's death, Pulsipher firmly aligned himself with Brigham Young and the Quorum of the Twelve Apostles. He migrated to Utah, where he served as a city councilor in Salt Lake City. During the Utah War (1857–1858), his sons served in the Nauvoo Legion to harass the approaching US Army, while Zerah remained in Salt Lake City, prepared to burn his property rather than surrender it to federal troops.

== 1862 Disciplinary Council and Later Life ==
In 1862, Pulsipher was brought before the First Presidency for performing two unauthorized polygamous marriages for William Bailey. During this era, church policy was shifting to require local bishop approval for plural marriages. Pulsipher was misled by Bailey, who claimed Brigham Young had authorized the marriage, and Pulsipher failed to verify this with Young or Frederick Kesler (his local bishop). As a result, on April 12, 1862, Pulsipher was released as a President of the Seventy and instructed to be rebaptized—a routine Latter-day Saint practice for spiritual renewal following church discipline, rather than an indicator of excommunication. He was also given the option to be ordained a high priest.

Following his release, Brigham Young assigned Pulsipher to relocate to the remote settlement of Shoal Creek (later Hebron, Utah) in southern Utah. There, Pulsipher presided over the local branch and advocated for sharing resources, such as beef and food, with the local Paiute people to maintain peaceful relations and mitigate the ecological disruption caused by the settlers' cattle. He resigned as branch president in January 1869 at the advice of Apostle Erastus Snow following an internal community dispute over the hiring of a local schoolteacher. He was subsequently ordained a patriarch and died in Hebron in 1872 as a member in full fellowship.

== Family ==
Pulsipher married four wives throughout his life and had 17 children:

- Mary or Polly Randall (1789–1812), married November 6, 1810. One child: Harriet Pulsipher.
- Mary Brown (1799–1886), married August 1815. Eleven children: Mary Ann, Almira, Nelson, Mariah, Sarah, John, Charles, Mary Ann, William M., Eliza Jane, and Fidelia.
- Prudence McNanamy (1803–1883), married July 12, 1854. No known children.
- Martha Hughes (1843–1907), married March 18, 1857. Five children: Martha Ann, Mary Elizabeth, Zerah James, Sarah Jane, and Andrew Milton.

The Church of Jesus Christ of Latter-day Saints titles
Preceded by Salmon Gee	Member of the First Seven Presidents of the Seventy; March 6, 1838 – April 12, 1862	Succeeded by John Van Cott
