= Samuel Bent =

American Mormon leader (1778–1846)

Samuel Bent (July 19, 1778 – August 16, 1846) was a member of the Council of Fifty and a leader in the early years of the Church of Jesus Christ of Latter-day Saints (LDS Church).

Bent was born in Barre, Worcester County, Massachusetts. He lived in New York and Michigan through much of his life and was a Congregationalist and Presbyterian. He married Mary Hilbourne when he was 27, and the couple had four children. In January 1833, he was baptized a member of the Church of Christ by Jared Carter in Pontiac, Michigan. Within a few days he was serving as a missionary. Bent was a member of Zion's Camp, and spent time between Michigan and Kirtland, Ohio, for the next few years. He attended the School of the Prophets. In 1836 he moved to Liberty, Missouri. He was one of the main targets of the mobs in that place that caused the Latter Day Saints to relocate to Caldwell County, Missouri, where Bent was a key figure in the founding of Far West, Missouri. After his wife Hilbourne died, he married Lettuce Palmer in 1837.

After going to Nauvoo, Illinois, at the time the Latter Day Saints were driven out of Missouri, Bent served as a colonel in the Nauvoo Legion and as a member of the Council of Fifty. In 1846 he was appointed as president of the Latter Day Saints in Garden Grove, Iowa, an office he filled until his death.
