= Newel Knight =

American Mormon leader

Newel Knight (September 13, 1800 – January 11, 1847) was a close friend of Joseph Smith and one of the first branch presidents in the Latter-day Saint movement.

Born at Marlboro, Vermont, Knight was the son of Joseph Knight, Sr. and Polly Peck. When Newel was about eight years old his family moved to Colesville, New York. He married Sally Colburn on June 7, 1825. The couple had three children.

Knight was baptized into the Church of Christ (the original name of the Church of Jesus Christ of Latter-day Saints), in May 1830 by David Whitmer. Prior to this, Joseph Smith, the founder of the Latter Day Saint movement, had cast an evil spirit out of Knight. This event is considered by some to be the first miracle performed in the history of the Latter-day Saint movement. Shortly after this, Knight had a vision of heaven.

With the baptism of Knight's parents, siblings, and aunts and uncles in July 1830, the Colesville Branch of the church was organized with Knight as its presiding authority. He continued to preside over this branch through its relocation to Ohio and then to Jackson County, Missouri.

When the second high council of the church was organized in Missouri in 1834, Knight was appointed a member of it. He would serve on three more high councils.

In September 1834, Knight's wife Sally died in Missouri during the persecution of the Latter Day Saints. On November 24, 1835, Knight married Lydia Goldthwaite Bailey at Kirtland, Ohio. This was the first marriage performed by Joseph Smith.

In both Missouri and later at Nauvoo, Illinois, Knight constructed mills. In 1846–1847, Knight was part of the Ponca Encampment, led by George Miller. While in Nebraska preparing to travel west, Knight grew sick and received a blessing at the hands of his wife Lydia. It was then reported that "all pain left him and in a short time he sweetly fell asleep in death without a struggle or a groan." Knight died at Ponca (in what is today Knox County, Nebraska) from lung inflammation, probably pneumonia.

His widow Lydia gave birth to Newel's ninth child, Hyrum Knight, seven months after Newel died. She brought the family to Utah in 1850. Newel's eighth child, Jesse Knight, was later prominent as a successful mining magnate and philanthropist.
