= John S. Carter (Latter Day Saints) =

American Latter Day Saint leader

John Sims Carter (c. 1792 – June 24, 1834) was an American leader in the early Latter Day Saint movement. In the Church of the Latter Day Saints based in Kirtland, Ohio, Carter was one of 12 members of the first presiding high council established in 1834 by church founder Joseph Smith.

== Early life ==
Carter was born in Killingworth, Connecticut, to Gideon Carter and Johanna Sims. He moved with his family to Benson, Vermont, in the 1790s. In 1813, he married Elizabeth Kinyon in Benson.

== Church activity ==
Carter was introduced to Mormonism by his brother Jared, who had been baptized into the new faith in 1831. John Carter was baptized in 1832, was ordained an elder, and proselytized with his brother on a mission in Vermont, where they established congregations in North West Bay and Bolton. In early 1833, Carter moved to Bolton, where he became a leader of the church.

In September 1833, Carter moved to Jackson County, Missouri, the location that Smith had identified as the gathering place of Latter Day Saints. Later, he moved to church headquarters in Kirtland, Ohio, and became a high priest. When the presiding high council was established by Smith on February 17, 1834, Carter and his brother Jared were selected as two of its inaugural members. Three days later, Carter was appointed by Smith to serve a mission to the eastern United States with Jesse Smith.

== Zion's Camp and death ==
Carter did not immediately leave on this mission, but instead volunteered to be part of Zion's Camp, an expedition of Latter Day Saints that intended to walk from Kirtland to Jackson County, Missouri, in an attempt to regain land that members of the church had been expelled from by non-Mormon settlers. The march proved difficult and there was some dissension among its participants. On June 20, 1834, after three men had contracted cholera, Smith reportedly warned the group:

in consequence of the disobedience of some who had been unwilling to listen to my words, but had rebelled, God had decreed that sickness should come upon the camp, and if they did not repent and humble themselves before God they should die like sheep with the rot; that I was sorry, but could not help it. The scourge must come; repentance and humility may mitigate the chastisement, but cannot altogether avert it. But there were some who would not give heed to my words.

Smith's record from June 24, 1834, while the camp was in Clay County, Missouri, states:

This night the cholera burst forth among us, and about midnight it was manifested in its most virulent form. Our ears were saluted with cries and moanings and lamentations on every hand; even those on guard fell to the earth with their guns in their hands, so sudden and powerful was the attack of this terrible disease. At the commencement, I attempted to lay on hands for their recovery, but I quickly learned by painful experience, that when the great Jehovah decrees destruction upon any people, and makes known His determination, man must not attempt to stay His hand. The moment I attempted to rebuke the disease I was attacked, and had I not desisted in my attempt to save the life of a brother, I would have sacrificed my own. The disease seized upon me like the talons of a hawk, and I said to the brethren: "If my work were done, you would have to put me in the ground without a coffin." ...

When the cholera made its appearance, Elder John S. Carter was the first man who stepped forward to rebuke it, and upon this, was instantly seized, and became the first victim in the camp. He died about six o'clock in the afternoon ....

Carter's body was wrapped in a blanket and buried near Rush Creek, Missouri.
