= James Foster (cricketer, born 1854) =

English cricketer

Personal information
- Full name: James Bryan Foster
- Born: 9 March 1854; Ramsgate, Kent
- Died: 22 November 1914 (aged 60); Stirchley, Warwickshire
- Batting: Right-handed
- Bowling: Right-arm medium

Domestic team information
- Years: Team
- 1880–1881: Kent

Career statistics
| Competition | First-class |
|---|---|
| Matches | 2 |
| Runs scored | 10 |
| Batting average | 3.33 |
| 100s/50s | 0/0 |
| Top score | 6 |
| Catches/stumpings | 2/– |
- Source: Cricinfo, 7 May 2013

James Bryan Foster (9 March 1854 – 22 November 1914) was an English cricketer. Foster was a right-handed batsman who bowled right-arm medium pace. He was born at Ramsgate, Kent. His name was also recorded as James Bryan Hone and James Bryan Hone-Foster.

Foster made two first-class appearances for Kent against Derbyshire in 1880 at Mote Park, Maidstone, and Yorkshire in 1881 at Park Avenue, Bradford. He scored a total of 10 runs at an average of 3.33, with a high score of 6.

He died at Stirchley, Warwickshire on 22 November 1914.

== Bibliography ==
- Carlaw, Derek (2020). Kent County Cricketers, A to Z: Part One (1806–1914) (PDF). Cardiff: ACS.
