= Henry Harriman (Mormon) =

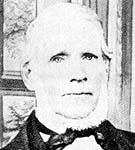

First Seven Presidents of the Seventy
- February 6, 1838 – May 17, 1891
- Called by: Joseph Smith, Jr.

Personal details
- Born: June 9, 1804; Rowley, Massachusetts, United States
- Died: May 17, 1891 (aged 86); Huntington, Utah Territory, United States

Henry Harriman (June 9, 1804 – May 17, 1891) was one of the First Seven Presidents of the Seventy of the Church of Jesus Christ of Latter Day Saints from 1838 until his death. The town of Herriman, Utah was named after him.

== Biography ==
Harriman was born in Rowley, Essex County, Massachusetts to Enoch Harriman and Sarah Brocklebank. In 1832, he was baptized a member of the Latter Day Saint church by Orson Hyde.

Harriman moved to Kirtland, Ohio in 1834 and was a member of Zion's Camp later that year. In February 1838, he became one of the Seven Presidents of the Seventy. That same year, Harriman was one of the leaders of the Church of Jesus Christ of Latter Day Saints who moved from Kirtland to Daviess County, Missouri in the Kirtland Camp. He then moved with the Saints to Nauvoo, Illinois. He was a Mormon pioneer and in 1849, he settled at Fort Harriman in Utah Territory with the Church of Jesus Christ of Latter-day Saints (LDS Church) and was the leader of the church members there so the settlement was named in his honor. The spelling of the town's name was later changed to "Herriman".

In 1857, Harriman was the president of the missionary handcart company that went east from Salt Lake City. After leading this company, he then went to Great Britain where he served as a missionary, but the Utah War caused him and other missionaries to return home early.

From 1882 until his death, Harriman was the Senior President of the Seventy.
