= James Foster (Mormon) =

American Mormon leader (1786–1841)

First Seven Presidents of the Seventy
- April 6, 1837 – December 21, 1841
- Called by: Joseph Smith

Personal details
- Born: April 1, 1786; Hillsborough County, New Hampshire, United States
- Died: December 21, 1841 (aged 55); Jacksonville, Illinois, United States

James Foster (April 1, 1786 – December 12, 1846) was an early Latter Day Saint leader and one of the early presidents of the Seventy. He took the place of Leonard Rich as one of the seven presidents.

Foster was involved in pioneer work in Missouri before the Later Day Saints were expelled from the area; and he later settled in Jacksonville, Illinois, where he died.
