= Evangelist (Latter Day Saints) =

In the Mormon movement, an evangelist is an ordained office of the ministry. In some denominations of the movement, an evangelist is referred to as a patriarch. However, the latter term was deprecated by the Community of Christ after the church began ordaining women to the priesthood. Other denominations, such as The Church of Jesus Christ (Bickertonite), have an evangelist position independent of the original "patriarch" office instituted movement founder Joseph Smith.

== Early Mormon movement ==
The first uses of the term "evangelist" in Mormon theology were mainly consistent with how the term is used by Protestants and Catholics.

In 1833, Joseph Smith introduced the new office of patriarch, to which he ordained his father. The elder Smith was given the "keys of the patriarchal Priesthood over the kingdom of God on earth", the same power said to be held by the Biblical patriarchs, which included the power to give blessings upon one's posterity. The elder Smith, however, was also called to give patriarchal blessings to the fatherless within the church, and the church as a whole, a calling he passed onto his eldest surviving son Hyrum Smith prior to his death. Hyrum himself was killed in 1844 along with Joseph, resulting in a succession crisis that broke the Latter Day Saint movement into multiple denominations.

It is not known who first identified the term "evangelist" with the office of patriarch. However, in an 1835 church publication, W. W. Phelps stated,

"[W]ho is not desirous of receiving a father's or an evangelist's blessing? Who can read the ancient patriarchal blessings, recorded in the bible, for the benefit of the church, without a heart filled with joy ... ?"

In 1839, Joseph Smith equated an evangelist with the office of patriarch, stating that "an Evangelist is a Patriarch".

The necessity of an evangelist in the church organization has been reinforced repeatedly, based on the passage in Ephesians 4:11, which states, "And he gave some, apostles; and some, prophets; and some, evangelists; and some, pastors and teachers". In 1834, while writing what he called the "principles of salvation", prominent early Mormon Oliver Cowdery stated that:

"We do not believe that he ever had a church on earth without revealing himself to that church: consequently, there were apostles, prophets, evangelists, pastors, and teachers, in the same."

Joseph Smith echoed Cowdery's statement in 1842, in a letter to a Chicago newspaper editor outlining the church's basic beliefs. Smith said that his religion "believe[s] in the same organization that existed in the primitive church, viz: apostles, prophets, pastors, teachers, evangelists".

== Community of Christ ==
In the Community of Christ, which was formerly known as the Reorganized Church of Jesus Christ of Latter Day Saints (RLDS Church), an evangelist is an office in the Melchizedec Order of the priesthood.

An evangelist-patriarch's primary responsibility was to provide special blessings to members of the church; these blessings were considered one of the eight sacraments in the RLDS Church. The local evangelist-patriarchs of the church were governed by an individual with church-wide authority known as the Presiding Patriarch.

In 1984, when the first women began to be ordained to the office of evangelist-patriarch, the RLDS Church changed the title of the evangelist-patriarchs to simply "evangelist". Similarly, it changed the title of the Presiding Patriarch to the "Presiding Evangelist". To be an evangelist, a person must also be a high priest of the Melchizedec Order of the priesthood.

The primary duty of an evangelist in the Community of Christ remains the giving of sacramental "evangelist's blessings"; it is for this reason that evangelists are often referred to as "ministers of blessing". Ideally, an evangelist is free from administrative responsibilities in the church in order to allow them to be fully responsive to the Holy Spirit. The blessings—which are given by the laying on of hands—provide counsel and advice and confer spiritual blessings upon the recipient(s). Not only individuals, but also couples, families, households, groups and congregations may receive an evangelist's blessing. Any person, including nonmembers, eight years of age or older can receive a blessing, although the blessing is rarely offered for someone who has not reached adolescence. A recipient may receive multiple evangelist's blessings in their life. Evangelist's blessings may or may not be recorded. If it is recorded in written form, a copy is stored in the church archives at Independence, Missouri.

All evangelists belong to the Order of Evangelists, which is led by the Presiding Evangelist (currently Jane M. Gardner, since 2016).

== The Church of Jesus Christ (Bickertonite) ==
In The Church of Jesus Christ (Bickertonite), the prescribed duties of an evangelist are to preach the gospel of Jesus Christ to every nation, kindred, language, and people. An evangelist is part of the Quorum of Seventy Evangelists.

=== Quorum of Seventy Evangelists ===
The Quorum of Seventy Evangelists is responsible for management of the International Missionary Programs of the church and assists Regions of the church with their individual Domestic Missionary Programs. The Quorum of Seventy oversees the activities of its Missionary Operating Committees to ensure the fulfilling of Christ's commandment to take the gospel to the entire world.

In 2007, the officers of the Quorum of Seventy Evangelists were:

- Evangelist Eugene Perri, President
- Evangelist Alex Gentile, Vice-President
- Evangelist Jeffrey Giannetti, Secretary

== The Church of Jesus Christ of Latter-day Saints ==
In the Church of Jesus Christ of Latter-day Saints (LDS Church), an evangelist is considered to be an office of the Melchizedek priesthood. However, the term "evangelist" is rarely used for this position; instead, the church has retained the term "patriarch", the term most commonly used by Joseph Smith.

The most prominent reference to the term "evangelist" in the LDS Church's literature is found in its "Articles of Faith", derived from the Wentworth letter—a statement by Smith in 1842 to a Chicago newspaper editor—that the church believes in "the same organization that existed in the primitive church", including "evangelists". Smith taught that "an Evangelist is an Patriarch".
