= Quorum of Seventy Evangelists =

In The Church of Jesus Christ (Bickertonite), the Quorum of Seventy Evangelists is a leadership body of the church. The prescribed duty of the evangelists is to preach the gospel of Jesus Christ to every nation, kindred, language, and people.

== Responsibilities ==
The Quorum of Seventy Evangelists is responsible for management of the International Missionary Programs of the church and assists Regions of the church with their individual Domestic Missionary Programs. The Quorum of Seventy oversees the activities of its Missionary Operating Committees to ensure the fulfilling of Christ’s commandment to take the gospel to the entire world.

== History ==
=== Current officers ===
As of 2016, the officers of the Quorum of Seventy Evangelists are:

- Evangelist Wayne Martorana, President
- Evangelist Robert Nicklow, Jr., Vice-President
- Evangelist Bryan Griffith, Secretary

=== Members 1862–1920 ===
#	Year Ordained	Name(s)
1	July 1862	John Ashton, John Bickerton, James Caldwell, Charles Cowan, John McPherson, William Menzies, Hugh Scott, Thomas Stevens, James Thompson
2	October 1904	Robert Anderson, Gustave Blum, J. C. Breckenridge, Samuel Campbell, William Crosby, James Curry, John Dillon, Francis Federer, Archibald Ferguson, John Grimes, Samuel Leonard, Cochran Lynch, G. W. Matthews, Abashi Risk, Samuel Sanders, Joseph Shutler, William Skillen, Thomas Sloan, Joseph Tucker, Sr., Solomon Van Lieu, William Wells
3	January 1905	Charles Ashton, Nephi Federer, William Helms
4	January 1908	Leslie Hardesty
5	July 1909	Charles Behanna, Vernon Chester, Richard Evans, William Weaver
6	January 1910	John Penn, Fred Smith
7	July 1910	John Majoros, Charles Morgan, George Neill, Harry Nicholson, John Ward
8	October 1910	George Garatt
9	January 1911	Solomon King
10	October 1914	James Cowan, Jacob Christman, Joseph Eason, Reese Jones, E.J. Perry, John Reconnu
11	Circa 1914-19	John Edwards, Alexander Federer, Charles Gilbert, Joseph Griffith, Charles Ligon, Shall Lowther, Amzi Lynn, Sr.
12	July 1919	Fred Heath
13	October 1919	George Cromblish, Charles F. Kennedy
14	July 1920	Joseph Corrado, Peter Garafola, John Molinatto, Caesar Talamonti

=== Members 1921–1941 ===
#	Year Ordained	Name(s)
1	July 1921	Ishmael D’Amico, Vincent DiGennaro, Joseph Dulisse, Joseph Molinatto
2	January 1922	Fritz Ackerman, William Bailey, Charles Behanna, John Cherry, Clyde Gibson, Martin King, Augustus Martin, Robert Patterson, Albert Sarver, Oran Thomas
3	October 1922	Walter Grimes
4	October 1923	Samuel Ambrose, Ermengildo Ciccati, Carl Damore, Anthony DiBattista, Phillip Mileco, Peter Molinatto
5	July 1924	Patsy DiBattista, Venanzio DiThomas, John Jacobs, Andrew Nemeth, Eugene Perry, Sr.
6	October 1926	Rocco Biscotti
7	July 1927	Angelo A. Corrado
8	October 1929	Vincent Clemente, Gabriel Mazzeo
9	July 1930	Dominic Giovannone
10	July 1932	William DiGennaro
11	July 1933	Teman Cherry, James Heaps, Charles Sanders
12	July 1934	Joseph Altomare, William Bailey, Joseph Benyola, Fred Fair, Louis Mazzeo, Antonio Todaro
13	January 1937	Samuel Kirschner, John Mancini, Ernest Shultz, Paul Vancik, Sr.
14	July 1939	Oran Thomas (reordained), Joseph Tucker
15	July 1940	Joseph Bittinger, Gorie Ciaravino, Daniel Corrado, John Dulisse, Mark Randy
16	April 1941	Clifford Burgess, Rocco Ensana, J. Frank Ford, James Heaps (reordained), Rocco Meo, Clarence Robinson, Frank Sirangelo

=== Members 1941–1956 ===
#	Year Ordained	Name(s)
1	July 1941	Dan Casasanta, Frank Rosatti
2	January 1943	Allen Henderson, George Manes
3	July 1943	Raymond Cosetti, Patsy Marinetti
4	October 1943	Dominic Cotellesse, Ansel D’Amico
5	January 1944	Nicholas Farragasso, Jr.
6	July 1945	Concetto Alessandro, Peter Capone, Henry Johnson
7	July 1946	Robert A. Watson
8	July 1947	Joseph Bologna
9	July 1948	Reno Bologna, Alfred D’Amico, Nicholas Peitrangelo, William Tucker
10	July 1949	Paul D’Amico, Vincent Lupo, Joseph Shazer, Christopher Trovato
11	April 1950	Dominic Moraco, Warren Nellis, Robert M. Watson
12	October 1950	Travis Perry
13	April 1951	Timothy Dominic Bucci
14	April 1952	Alexander Robinson
15	October 1952	Herman Kennedy (re-ordained)
16	April 1953	William Tucker
17	April 1954	Joseph Milantoni
18	October 1954	Louis Mazzeo
19	April 1955	Paul Benyola, Russell Cadman
20	April 1956	Frank Giavonnone
21	October 1956	A.A. Dick, Ralph Leet
22	November 1956	Joseph Capone

=== Members 1957–1969 ===
#	Year Ordained	Name(s)
1	April 1957	John Ross
2	May 1957	Dominic Thomas
3	June 1957	Idris Martin
4	October 1957	James Campbell
5	April 1958	Joseph Calabrese
6	April 1959	Frank Calabrese, Alfred Domenico, Nick Persico, Dominic Rose
7	May 1959	Felix Buccellato
8	October 1960	Giuseppe Buonofiglio, Alvin Swanson
9	April 1961	Leonard Lovalvo
10	April 1962	Daniel Picciuto
11	October 1962	Anthony Brutz
12	April 1964	George Johnson, Sr.
13	October 1964	Spencer G. Everett
14	May 1965	Benjamin Ciccati
15	October 1966	Ralph Berardino, John Manes
16	April 1968	Edward Purdue
17	May 1968	Richard Christman, Anthony Picciuto
18	October 1968	Anthony Lovalvo
19	April 1969	Meredith Griffith
20	May 1969	Anthony Gerace
