= Jared Carter (Latter Day Saints) =

American church leader (1801–1849)

President, Presiding High Council of Kirtland, Ohio
- September 9, 1847 – unknown

Personal details
- Born: June 14, 1801; Benson, Vermont, United States
- Died: July 6, 1849 (aged 48); DeKalb County, Illinois, United States
- Resting place: DeKalb County, Illinois, United States
- Spouse(s): Lydia Ames
- Children: 9
- Parents: Gideon Carter; Johanna Sims
- Relatives: John S. Carter, brother

Jared Carter (June 14, 1801 – July 6, 1849) was an early leader in the Latter Day Saint movement. He joined the Church of Jesus Christ of Latter-day Saints in 1831 and soon after served a mission in the northeastern United States. He was mentioned by name in section 79 of the Doctrine and Covenants; the passage encouraged him to continue his work as a missionary. He has been described as "one of the Church's great missionaries" of the 1830s. In 1834, Carter was chosen as a member of the first Presiding High Council of Kirtland, Ohio, and then became the council's president in 1837. After being disfellowshipped from the LDS Church and briefly joining the Strangite church, Carter re-joined the Church of Jesus Christ of Latter-day Saints while living in Chicago. He died in DeKalb County, Illinois.

== Early life ==
Carter was born on June 14, 1801, in Benson, Vermont, to Gideon Carter and Johanna Sims, the fifth of six children. His siblings included Simeon, Prudence, John S., Gideon H., and Susanna Carter. The family had moved to Benson, Vermont from Killingworth, Connecticut in 1797. He married Lydia Ames on September 20, 1823, in Benson and had nine children: five sons and four daughters. By 1831, he was living in Chenango, New York, working as a tanner.

In January 1831, while on a business trip to Lisle, New York, Carter was introduced to the Book of Mormon by John Peck. After reading passages in the book, Carter recorded: "I became immediately convinced that it was a revelation of God and it had such an influence on my mind that I had no mind to pursue my business." On February 20, 1831, Carter was baptized into the Church of Jesus Christ of Latter-day Saints by Hyrum Smith in Colesville, New York. He was reportedly "so warmed by the spirit of God that he didn't feel the cold of the water on him at that winter season during the half-mile walk to shelter and a change of clothing." Carter then travelled with the Colesville Branch of the church to Thompson, Ohio, in May 1831, and thereafter moved to Kirtland, Ohio.

== Involvement in the Latter Day Saint movement ==
In June 1831, Carter was made a priest in the church after a revelation given in Doctrine and Covenants 52:38 urged him to be ordained to this calling. That same month, Carter was present at the fourth general conference of the church, where he discovered that his brother Simeon had been baptized into the church around the same time that he himself had joined the faith. That September, Carter was made an elder. He recorded witnessing healing miracles throughout his early years in the church, and these experiences apparently strengthened his faith. After Newel Knight challenged Carter on the validity of these healing miracles, Carter left the Colesville body of Latter Day Saints and moved to Lorain County, Ohio, where his brother Simeon lived.

=== Missionary work ===
"Since I left home and was ordained to preach the gospel and was preaching from place to place now, I thought that I had great reason to thank and praise the Lord for what he had done for me and my brothers and sisters of my father's family. ... I can say that God has blessed me according to the prophecy of Brother Joseph [Smith], before I went from Ohio. He has blessed me with sheaves and with health and blessed be his name." —Jared Carter, journal recording of his first mission

Shortly after being ordained an elder, Carter was appointed to be a missionary in the eastern United States, leaving Ohio on September 22, 1831. He and Ebenezer Page traveled back to Carter's hometown of Benson, Vermont, planning to share the message of the faith with Carter's family and friends. Twenty-seven people in the area chose to join the church, and their chapel, which had been a part of the Free Will Baptist denomination, "soon became a Latter-day Saint meeting place." On this mission, Carter also reportedly healed the leg of John Tanner, one of the primary financial benefactors of the early church, leading to Tanner's conversion to the LDS Church. Carter also baptized Zera Pulsipher, who became a leader in the church. He returned to Kirtland in February 1831, after five months of missionary service. He was encouraged by a revelation given in Doctrine and Covenants 79 to continue preaching and proselyting. Between 1831 and 1834, Carter served missions in New York, Ohio, Pennsylvania, Vermont, Michigan Territory, and Upper Canada. He founded "the first Latter-day Saint branch of converts in Michigan." Carter introduced Mormonism to his brother John, who also became a leader in the church. Gideon, another of Carter's brothers, and his sisters Prudence and Susanna also joined the faith. Carter and his brothers baptized approximately half of the converts from New England and eastern New York at the time. These converts included members who later made significant contributions to Mormon history. According to records, the Carters baptized between 138 and 170 people, as well as an estimated 185 more whose names were not recorded.

=== Presiding High Council of Kirtland, Ohio ===
In May 1833, Carter became a high priest and was tasked, alongside Hyrum Smith and Reynolds Cahoon, with accumulating building supplies for a school in Kirtland. In August of that year, he was chosen as a member of the building committee of the Kirtland Temple. He worked on constructing the temple and also participated in the Kirtland Safety Society. When the organization of Latter Day Saints known as Zion's Camp left for Missouri, Carter stayed behind to oversee the Kirtland Temple building committee's efforts. On February 17, 1834, Carter became one of the inaugural members of the first presiding high council of the church in Kirtland, Ohio. As a member of the Presiding High Council of Kirtland, Carter fielded complaints from the community when the Kirtland Safety Society—a bank established by the Latter Day Saints—failed. Carter became the president of the Presiding High Council of Kirtland on September 9, 1837, and continued as a member of it when church headquarters were moved to Far West, Missouri. In this capacity, he testified in favor of the accused in the excommunication trials of Oliver Cowdery, David Whitmer, and Lyman E. Johnson. Carter is mentioned in a number of the revelations of Smith which make up the Doctrine and Covenants; one section, section 79, is addressed directly to Carter.

== Death and later years ==
Upon the death of Joseph Smith, Carter supported the succession claims of James Strang. He was subsequently disfellowshipped from the LDS Church. Carter joined the Church of Jesus Christ of Latter Day Saints (Strangite) in 1846, but was excommunicated within months of joining. After his excommunication, Carter joined the Church of Jesus Christ of Latter-day Saints (LDS Church) in Chicago. By January 1847, he was "returned to full fellowship" in the church as a member of the Yoree Branch in Chicago. He moved to DeKalb County, Illinois, where he died on July 6, 1849. Evidence suggests that some of his children remained in the LDS Church.
