= High council (Latter Day Saints) =

Governing body in the Latter Day Saint movement

In Mormonism, a high council is one of several different governing bodies that have existed in the church hierarchy in many denominations in the Latter Day Saint movement. Most often, the term refers to a stake high council in a local stake, but other high councils include the standing Presiding High Council in Zion, and the "travelling high council", better-known today as the Quorum of the Twelve Apostles.

== History of high councils ==
On February 17, 1834, Joseph Smith, the founder of the movement, created a presiding high council at church headquarters in Kirtland, Ohio. This body consisted of twelve men and was headed by the First Presidency. The original members of the high council in Kirtland were:

- Joseph Smith, Sr.
- John Smith
- Joseph Coe
- John Johnson
- Martin Harris
- John S. Carter
- Jared Carter
- Oliver Cowdery
- Samuel H. Smith
- Orson Hyde
- Sylvester Smith
- Luke Johnson

This high council took on the role of chief judicial and legislative body of the local church and handled such things as excommunication trials and approval of all church spending. This high council became subordinate to the high council of Zion, which was organized in Jackson County, Missouri. A presidency was also called to head the high council of Zion. The members of this presidency and high council were:

- David Whitmer (president)
- William W. Phelps (assistant president)
- John Whitmer (assistant president)
- Christian Whitmer
- Newel Knight
- Simeon Carter
- Calvin Beebe
- William E. McLellin
- Solomon Hancock
- Thomas B. Marsh
- Lyman Wight
- Parley P. Pratt
- Orson Pratt
- John Murdock
- Levi Jackman

Later, when other high councils were established in newly formed stakes of the church, the high council of Zion (first Kirtland, then Far West, Missouri and finally Nauvoo, Illinois) took on a role of "presiding" over the lesser high councils. (Cases tried in the high councils of outlying stakes were regularly appealed to the high council of Zion.) Most Latter Day Saint historians view the high council of Zion as distinct from a stake high council, as there is no "stake" at the "center place" of the tent of Zion. During Smith's lifetime, high council members were ordained high priests, but not given any priesthood keys.

In 1835, Smith created an additional "traveling high council" of twelve men to oversee the missionary work of the church. Like many early church leaders including the Three and Eight Witnesses of the Book of Mormon and, initially all church elders, the members of this traveling high council were known as "apostles." Later, as this council grew in importance, it became known as the Council or Quorum of the Twelve Apostles, and other church leaders ceased to be called apostles.

Thomas B. Marsh was the original president of the traveling high council which, in practice, was initially subordinate to the high council of Zion. For example, in 1838, when vacancies arose in the traveling high council, it was the presiding high council at Far West which voted on and filled the vacancies. Later, as the traveling high council evolved and began to be known as the Quorum of the Twelve Apostles, it acquired equal status with the presiding high council, and both were subordinated to the First Presidency. When the high council of Zion was dissolved after the church members were expelled from Missouri, the high council organized at the new church headquarters in Nauvoo, Illinois, where it functioned as the presiding high council of the church, overseeing appeals from high councils in outlying stakes.

After the 1844 succession crisis, high councils developed differently in the various denominations of the Latter Day Saint movement.

== High councils in the Church of Jesus Christ of Latter-day Saints ==
Each stake in the Church of Jesus Christ of Latter-day Saints, the largest Latter Day Saint denomination, has a high council consisting of twelve high priests. The stake high council assists the presidency of the stake in approving the calling of stake leaders and some ward leaders, conducting membership councils in certain cases, and communicating to and instructing leaders of wards and branches in the stake.
