= Seventy (Latter Day Saints) =

Priesthood office within Mormonism

Seventy is a priesthood office in the Melchizedek priesthood of several denominations within the Latter Day Saint movement, including the Church of Jesus Christ of Latter-day Saints (LDS Church). Traditionally, a Latter Day Saint holding this priesthood office is a "traveling minister" and an "especial witness" of Jesus Christ, charged with the mission of preaching the gospel to the entire world under the direction of the Twelve Apostles. Latter Day Saints teach that the office of seventy was anciently conferred upon the seventy disciples mentioned in the Gospel of Luke 10:1-2. Multiple individuals holding the office of seventy are referred to collectively as "seventies".

== Place in Latter Day Saint hierarchy ==
In practical terms, the priesthood office of seventy is one which has varied widely over the course of history. As originally envisioned by Joseph Smith, founder of the Latter Day Saint movement, in the 1830s, the seventy were to be a body composed of several separate quorums of up to 70 individuals each, all of which would be led by seven presidents. These presidents, chosen from the first quorum, would appoint and direct the other quorums of seventy.

In the LDS Church, the largest of the Latter Day Saint denominations, the quorums of the seventy are directed and supervised hierarchically by the Quorum of the Twelve Apostles, who are in turn directed by the First Presidency. As introduced by Smith, the apostles and the seventy had authority only outside the main body of Latter Day Saints in Zion, and in the outlying stakes. Members in Zion and the stakes were led by the High Council of Zion (under the direction of the First Presidency) and stake high councils.

As a body, the seventy in the LDS Church are considered to be equal in priesthood authority with the Quorum of the Twelve Apostles. This presumably means that if the apostles were killed or incapacitated, the seventy could take over the function of the apostles. However, in such circumstances, the seventy would be required to act unanimously.

== Early Latter Day Saint quorums of seventy ==
The First Quorum of the Seventy came into being in 1835 when seven men were set apart as the First Seven Presidents of the Seventy.

In 1837, six of the seven presidents were released because it was discovered that they had previously been ordained high priests. Five of these men were ultimately replaced by others. The other two—Levi W. Hancock and Joseph Young—remained members of the First Seven Presidents for the rest of their lives.

== LDS Church ==
Since 2020, the LDS Church's Quorums of the Seventy have been organized into twelve quorums with a presidency of seven. The seventy act as emissaries of the church's Quorum of the Twelve Apostles and First Presidency in organizing, training, proselytizing, and administering to millions of church members scattered all across the globe. The seventy are the layer between local church administration and general church administration.

Members of the First and the Second Quorums of the Seventy are general authorities of the church with responsibilities covering the church as a whole.

Members of the Third through Twelfth Quorums of the Seventy are called an area seventy and are ordained to the priesthood office of seventy, but they are not general authorities of the church. Area seventies generally have authority only within a geographical unit of the church called an area.

== Community of Christ ==
Within Community of Christ, a seventy is also considered to be an elder but is not a High Priest. Part of the function of the seventy is a missionary role and he or she works closely with the apostle in charge of his or her mission field. Seventies are organized into nine quorums; each quorum being presided over by a president. These presidents make up the Council of Presidents of Seventy and are collectively led by the Senior President of the Presidents of Seventy. All nine quorums are equal with one another. When someone is ordained a seventy, that person automatically becomes a member of one of the Nine Quorums, and remains a member of one of the Quorums (although the specific quorum may change based on residency) so long as that person remains a seventy. In other words, it is not possible to be a seventy and not belong to one of these quorums.

The current roster of Presidents of Seventy include:

- Africa Quorum - Larry M. McGuire
- Canada, Dominican Republic, & Mexico Quorum - John F. Glazer
- Central & South America Quorum - Humberto Rosario del Rosario
- Eurasia Quorum - Joey S. Williams
- Pacific Asia Quorum - Adam R. Wade
- South Central Asia Quorum - Larry M. McGuire
- Central & Northeast USA Quorum - Joelle Wight
- North Central & Western USA Quorum - Karin F. Peter, Senior President of Seventy
- Southern USA Quorum - Larry M. McGuire

Historically, there have always been seven quorums, with a maximum of 70 members each. However, on January 17, 2010, Prophet-President Stephen M. Veazey announced that the number of quorums (and presidents) could be flexible, based on the current needs of the church. The change from seven to ten quorums occurred after the acceptance of Doctrine and Covenants section 164 at the World Conference in April 2010.

== The Church of Jesus Christ (Bickertonite) ==
The seventy in this church are called the Seventy Evangelists and strictly limited to that number. They are ordained evangelists, not seventies. Missionary work is the focus of this calling in The Church of Jesus Christ.

== Apostolic United Brethren ==
There is currently one functioning Quorum of Seventy in the Apostolic United Brethren. Its members are distributed geographically among AUB congregations, with men ordained to this office called for life.
