= Zion's Camp =

1834 expedition of Latter Day Saints led by Joseph Smith

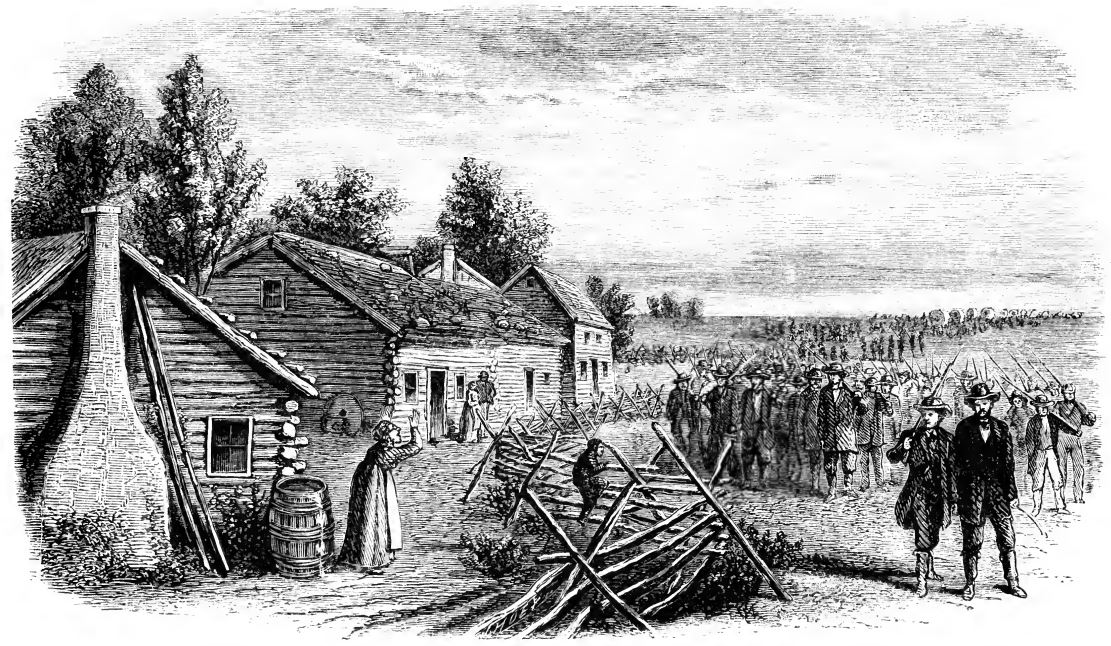
Image from the camp in the book The Rocky Mountain Saints.

Zion's Camp was an expedition of Latter Day Saints led by Joseph Smith, from Kirtland, Ohio, to Clay County, Missouri, during May and June 1834 in an unsuccessful attempt to regain land from which the Saints had been expelled by non-Mormon settlers. In Latter Day Saint belief, this land is destined to become a city of Zion, the center of the millennial kingdom; and Smith dictated a command from God ordering him to lead his church like a modern Moses to redeem Zion "by power, and with a stretched-out arm."

Receiving word of the approaching Latter Day Saints, the Missourians formed militias, which outnumbered Smith's men. Smith then dictated another revelation stating that the church was presently unworthy to "redeem Zion" because of its lack of commitment to the United Order, or law of consecration. They were told they must "wait a little season" until its elders could receive their promised endowment of heavenly power. The expedition was disbanded on July 25, 1834, during a cholera epidemic, and a majority of survivors returned to Ohio.

Notwithstanding the failure of the expedition to regain the land, many camp members "believed heaven had watched over them." Heber C. Kimball said angels were seen. "Most camp members felt more loyal to Joseph than ever, bonded by their hardships," and the next generation of leaders came from members of Zion’s Camp: two of the next three church presidents, 56% of the first 25 apostles of the church, all seven presidents of the seventy, and 63 other members of the seventy. "Joseph's own devotion to Zion and the gathering grew more intense," and when offered an opportunity to "start again elsewhere, he refused."

== Background ==
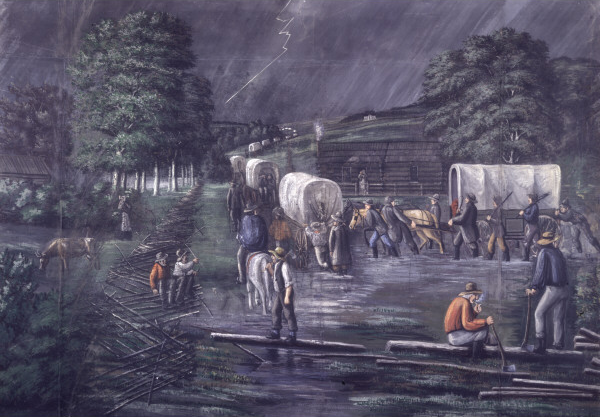
Zion's Camp by C.C.A. Christensen

A fundamental tenet of Latter Day Saint theology is that the biblical New Jerusalem will be built in the Americas, a belief established by 1829 and included in the Book of Mormon. On July 20, 1831, Smith identified the location of this New Jerusalem as Jackson County, Missouri and began sending Latter Day Saint settlers there to establish a City of Zion, which was to be a Latter Day Saint millennial kingdom.

By the summer of 1833, there were about 1,200 Latter Day Saints in Jackson County, and older settlers felt threatened by their political and economic power, a fear exacerbated by rumors that Latter Day Saints favored abolitionism. On July 23, 1833, citizens of Jackson County held a meeting about the influx of Mormon settlers, whom they describe as "little above the condition of our blacks either in regard to property or education", accusing the Mormons of having a "corrupting influence on our slaves". It accused the Mormons of planning to take over the county, writing "We are daily told, and not by the ignorant alone, but by all classes of them, that we, (the Gentiles,) of this county are to be cut off, and our lands appropriated by them for inheritances." The address alleged that "many of this deluded and infatuated people have been taught to believe that our lands were to be won from us by the sword." The address argued "it requires no gift of prophecy to tell that the day is not far distant when the civil government of the country will be in their hands". It finally concluded with a demand that no further Mormons come to the county, that those present in the county leave, that their paper cease printing immediately. It ended with an ominous threat of violence, calling for "those to fail to comply with these requisitions [to] be referred to those of their brethern who have the gifts of divination... to inform them of the lot that await them".

After a two hour adjournment, during which the demands were presented to prominent Mormons, the meeting reconvened and were told that the local Mormon leaders requested an "unreasonable" amount of time to respond. As a result, it was unanimously resolved that the Mormon printing office should be razed and its printing press and type seized.

Forming militia groups, the "old settlers" as they were called, organized attacks against the Latter Day Saints during the summer of 1833. A revelation dictated by Smith in August 1833 discouraged immediate retaliation but permitted Latter Day Saints to retaliate after the fourth act of aggression and "unto the third and fourth generation." The Saints initially attempted to regain their lands through political and legal means, enlisting four Missouri attorneys to communicate with the court and the Missouri government. This decision to engage lawyers and fight the issue in court likely sparked further violence in late October 1833. When the Missourians attacked the Saints the fourth time, they fought back as allowed by Smith's revelation. By the end of 1833, Latter Day Saint homes, as well as the church's print shop, had been destroyed, and nearly all church members had fled the county. Latter Day Saint refugees settled temporarily in neighboring counties, including Clay County to the north, across the Missouri River from Jackson County.

In December 1833, Smith dictated another revelation about the "redemption of Zion." It commanded Missouri settlers to seek redress through the courts or the political process but warned that a military solution would become necessary should those efforts fail. The revelation predicted that God would soon command Smith to gather warriors of the church to "get ye straightway unto my land; break down the walls of mine enemies; throw down their tower, and scatter their watchmen." Further, should the Missourians oppose the Saints, the latter would "avenge me of mine enemies, that by and by I may come with the residue of mine house and possess the land." The legal and political efforts appeared futile, although after the security of a February 24, 1834 court hearing was threatened by Missourian protesters, it was postponed until late 1834.

== Formation of the camp ==
At the headquarters of the Latter Day Saints in Kirtland, Ohio, Smith received a revelation from God, calling for an expedition to be raised in Kirtland, which would then march to Missouri and "redeem Zion." About 200 men and a number of women and children volunteered to join this expedition which became known as "Zion's Camp."

== The march ==
Smith and his volunteers left Kirtland on May 4, 1834. By June 4, they had marched across Indiana and Illinois, reaching the Mississippi River, which they crossed, entering Missouri. They crossed most of the state by the end of June, and news of their approach caused some alarm among non-Mormons in Jackson and Clay Counties.

Attempts to negotiate a return of the Latter Day Saints to Jackson County proved fruitless, but Smith decided to disband Zion's Camp rather than attempt to "redeem Zion" by force. Many members of the camp believed they should fight and criticized Smith. Subsequently many contracted cholera. The 900 mile march failed in its objective, and fourteen participants died.

== Aftermath ==
Smith encountered increased hostility when he returned to Kirtland. Nevertheless, many of the participants in Zion's Camp became committed loyalists to the movement. When Smith returned to Kirtland, he organized the Quorum of the Twelve Apostles and the First Quorum of the Seventy, choosing primarily men who had served in Zion's Camp.

The Latter Day Saints failed to achieve their goal of returning to Jackson County, and although the Missouri legislature approved a compromise which set aside the new Caldwell County specifically for their settlement in 1836, two years later, Missourians drove the Saints across the Mississippi into Illinois.

Long after Smith's death, members of what is now known as the Church of Christ (Temple Lot) became the first members of the Latter Day Saint movement to return to Jackson County in an attempt to redeem Zion.

== See also ==
- List of Zion's Camp participants
- Later Smith forces: Danites and Nauvoo Legion,
- American new religious paramilitaries: Fruit of Islam and Sea Org
