= Nauvoo Historic District =

Historic district in Illinois, United States

- U.S. National Register of Historic Places
- U.S. National Historic Landmark District
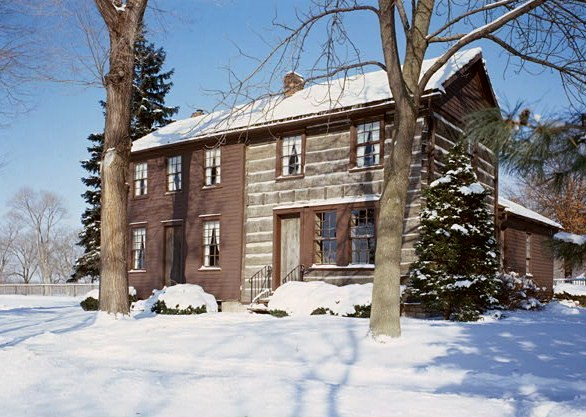
- Joseph Smith Homestead

- Location within Illinois Location within the United States
- Location: Nauvoo, Illinois
- Coordinates: 40.548°N 91.382°W
- Area: 3,850 acres (1,560 ha)
- Built: 1839
- NRHP reference No.: 66000321

Significant dates
- Added to NRHP: October 15, 1966
- Designated NHLD: January 20, 1961

Nauvoo Historic District is a National Historic Landmark District containing the city of Nauvoo, Illinois. The historic district is nearly coterminous with the City of Nauvoo as it was incorporated in 1840, but it also includes the Pioneer Saints Cemetery (40.5369°N 91.3507°W), the oldest Mormon cemetery in the area, which is outside the town boundary.

Contributing structures include:

- Brigham Young Home
- Calvin Pendleton Home and School
- Concert Hall (no longer in existence)
- Cultural Hall (Masonic Lodge)
- David Sessions Home
- Edward Hunter Home
- Heber C. Kimball House
- John Taylor Home, Printshop, and Post Office (Times and Seasons Building)
- Jonathan Browning Houses and Workshops
- Joseph Smith Homestead
- Joseph Smith Mansion House
- Lucy Mack Smith Home
- Lyon Drug Store
- Nauvoo House
- Nauvoo Illinois Temple
- Nauvoo Visitors Center
- Newel K. Whitney Home (private residence)
- Orson Hyde Home
- Red Brick Store
- Riser Boot and Shoe Shop
- Sarah Granger Kimball Home
- Scovil Bakery
- Seventies Hall
- Smith Family Cemetery
- Stoddard Tin Shop
- Webb Blacksmith Shop
- West Grove
- Wilford Woodruff House
- Willard Richards Home (private residence)
- William Gheen Home
- William Weeks Home
- Yearsley House (missionary house)

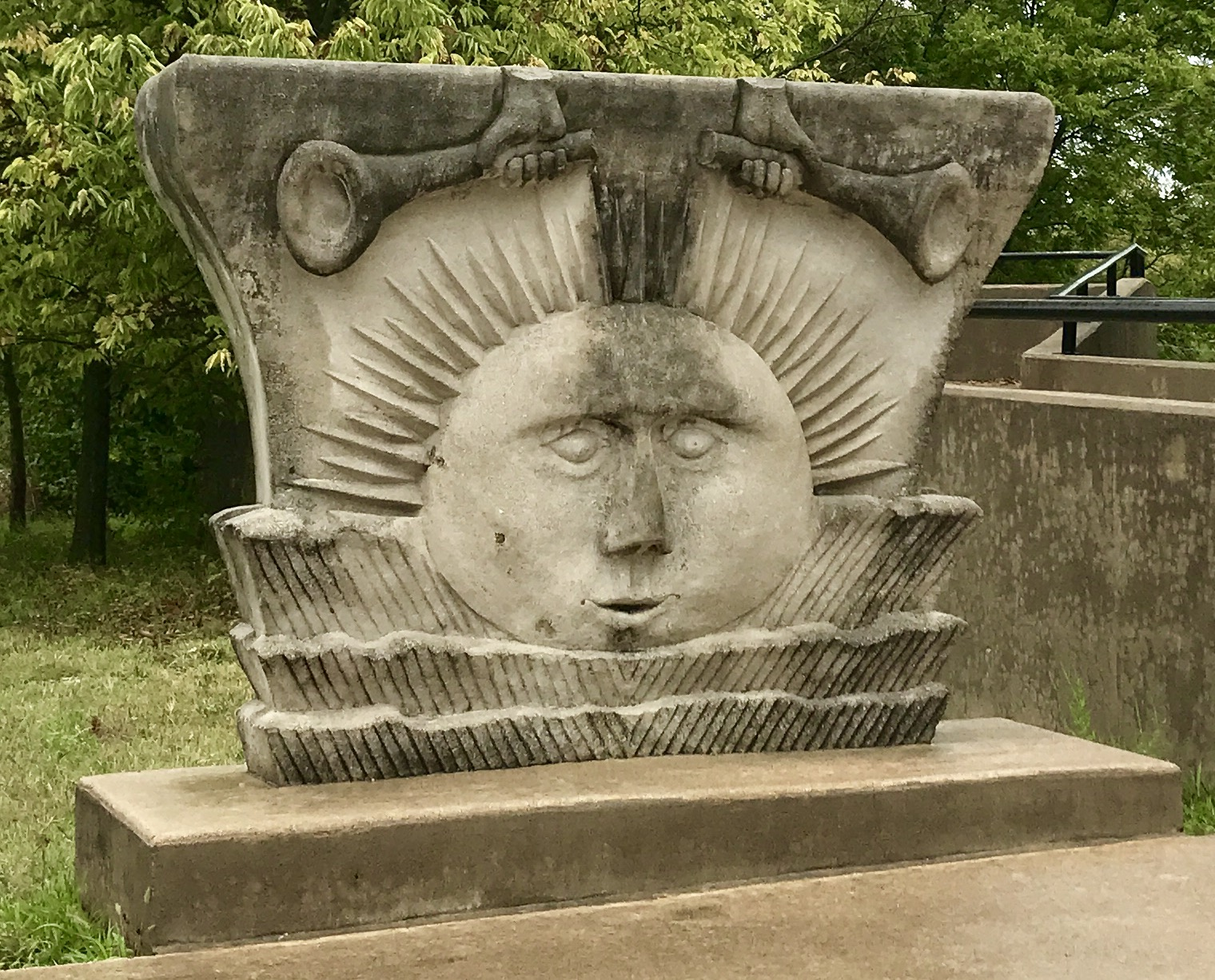
Carving at the LDS Temple Quarry

There are many non-contributing modern structures in the district.

The district was declared a National Historic Landmark in 1961. It is significant as the headquarters of The Church of Jesus Christ of Latter Day Saints from 1839 and 1846, and as an important early example of community planning by the Latter Day Saint movement. The city's basic plan is still discernible despite the many modern intrusions, and there are a wealth of historical archaeological sites related to the early Latter Day Saint settlement period, including the site of the Nauvoo Temple, which occupied a prominent location in the city; it was burned in 1848 and its remains were leveled by a tornado in 1865.

Due to the large influx of Mormons, Nauvoo became Illinois's largest city for a brief period in the 1840s. Despite this, it lacked a distinct commercial center, consisting mainly of residences laid out on broad streets on a rectangular grid.

The majority of the Latter Day Saints left Nauvoo in 1848 though some, notably Emma Hale Smith, her children, and Lucy Mack Smith, continued to live there. After assuming the leadership of the Reorganized Church of Jesus Christ of Latter Day Saints (Community of Christ) in 1860, Joseph Smith III, living in the Smith Family Homestead, would lead that portion of the Latter Day Saint movement from Nauvoo until he relocated to Plano, Illinois, in 1866.

In the mid-1950s, members of The Church of Jesus Christ of Latter-day Saints began to purchase and restore various properties and share a faith-based history of the 1840s time period (history of Mormonism). In 2024, the Church of Jesus Christ of Latter-day Saints purchased the Joseph Smith Historic Site from Community of Christ. As of March 2024, Community of Christ continues to own the Smith Family Cemetery, whose maintenance is funded by the Smith Family Foundation, and is exploring the possibility of gifting the cemetery to the Smith Family Foundation.

== See also ==
- History of Nauvoo, Illinois
- List of National Historic Landmarks in Illinois
