= Visitors Center (Latter-day Saint) =

A visitors' center is a building often near a temple or historic site of the Church of Jesus Christ of Latter-day Saints (LDS Church) where missionaries teach visitors about the tenets of their faith and other community events are held. Visitors' centers often include a replica of Bertel Thorvaldsen's Christus statue, exhibits, musical performances, devotionals, and a Family History Center (FHC).

== History ==
=== Nauvoo House ===
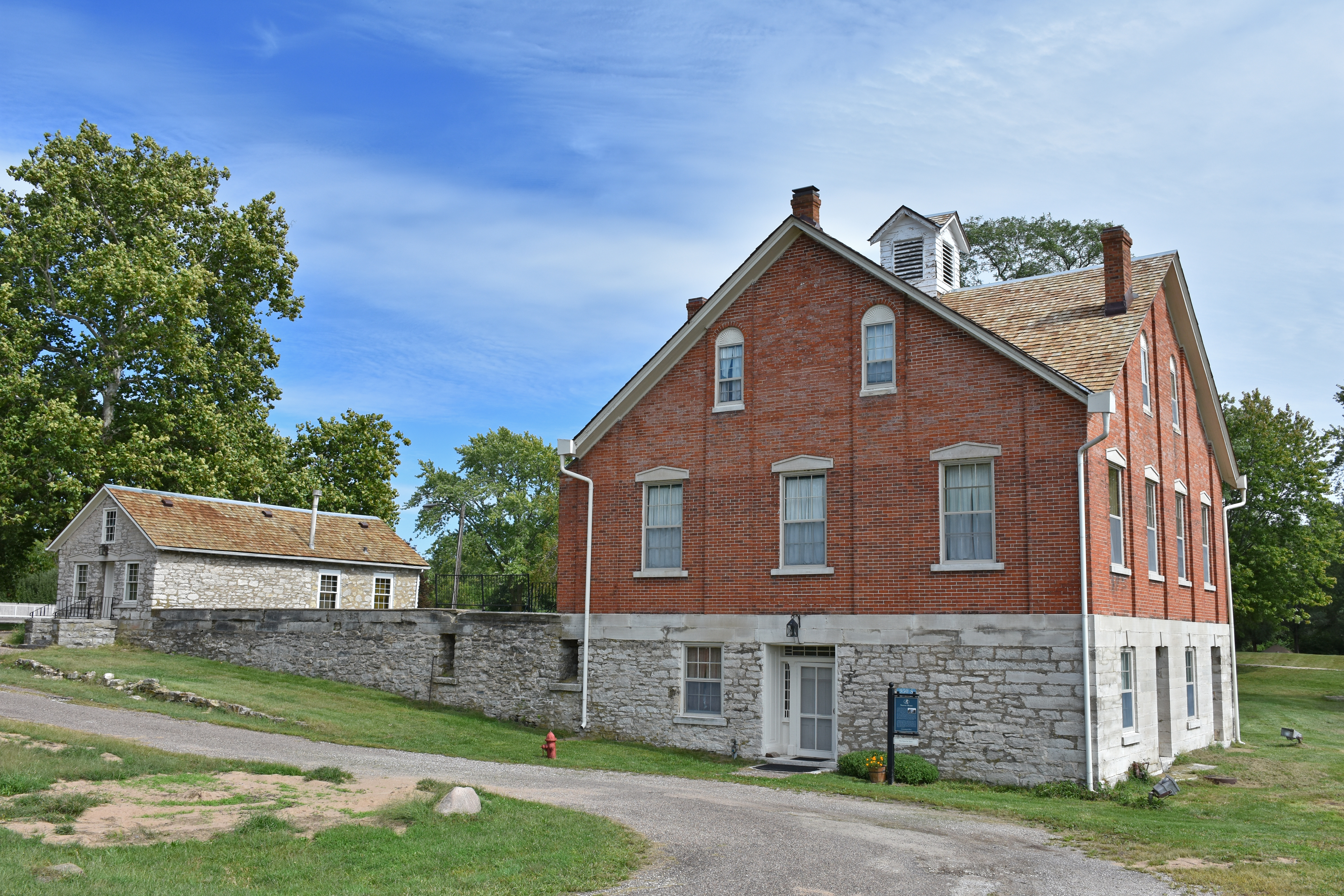
The Nauvoo House

In a revelation he said was received on January 19, 1841, Joseph Smith, the founder of the Latter Day Saint movement, was commanded to build the Nauvoo House a waypoint for travelers and immigrants and a place for them to learn about the church. To construct the project stock was sold but the ownership remained under the Smith family. The project was not completed before the death of Joseph and Hyrum Smith and the 1847 Exodus from Nauvoo. In later years, Emma Smith and Lewis C. Bidamon would complete the building as the Riverside Mansion. In 1909, it was bought by the Community of Christ and currently is lodging for tourists to Nauvoo.

=== Early tourism in Salt Lake City ===
The LDS Church published essays in the 1850s to explain the doctrine and logic behind polygamy, but they were received poorly and by the 1870s the church did not try to explain itself to anyone not interested in becoming a member. When railroad tourism began to become popular in the 1870s, Salt Lake City became a popular tourist destination because of the natural tourist attractions like the Great Salt Lake, combined with negative and mostly false publicity associated with polygamy and perceived anti-American sentiment. Between 1869 and 1890, the population of Salt Lake City decreased from church members being 90–95% of the population to about 50%. The new residents who were not church members would take visitors on carriage tours from the train station where the drivers would point out houses built for polygamous families and tell "yarns" about what went on inside the temple. Some tourists would stop to look in the windows of Lion House and make guesses on how many wives were home.

In 1860, James Townsend, a polygamist church member, built a bed and breakfast called the Townsend House and offered tours of the city. In 1875, Charles J. Thomas was made the first official guide to Temple Square. He primarily performed groundskeeping, but also gave tours of the Salt Lake Temple's construction site. In 1877, The Salt Lake Tribune published an editorial criticizing tourists to Salt Lake and compared their visits to Temple Square and Brigham Young's house with a visit to a Brothel in any other city.

In 1887, William. S. McCornick, Patrick Lanahan, and Heber J. Grant founded the Salt Lake Chamber of Commerce. In 1888, the organization published an open letter stating that the negative press was hurting investment in the state, and in 1890 spent $4,000 to counter negative press in the East.

In 1893, LeRoi Snow, son of Lorenzo Snow, a future church president, stopped a tour and invited the group to meet his father and tour their house. This is said to be the origin of the first official efforts to proselyte in and around Temple Square. Active organized proselyting efforts towards tourists began in 1902.

=== Temple Square Bureau of Information ===
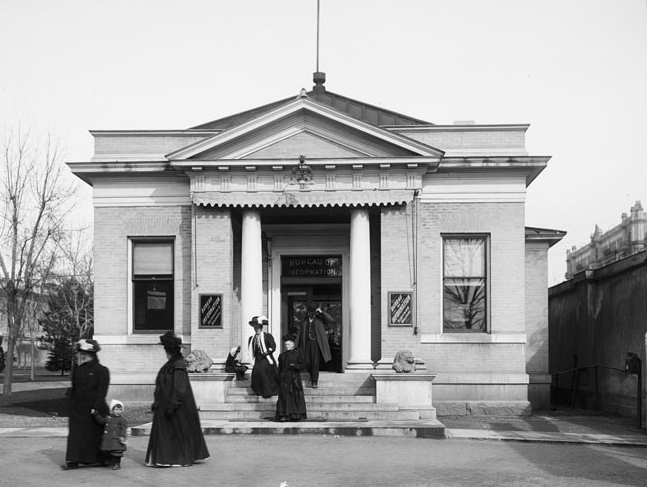
Bureau of Information on Temple Square, 1909

The bureau of information was established in 1902 because church leadership recognized the need for clear information about the church in and around Temple Square. It was right next to the south gate of Temple Square. Local youth were recruited to give tours and provide information from a small booth under the direction of Ben Goddard. In 1904, the booth was replaced by a brick building and in 1918 there was another renovation including a museum and a gift shop. Over time the bureau began to publish their own pamphlets and distribute church supplies as well.

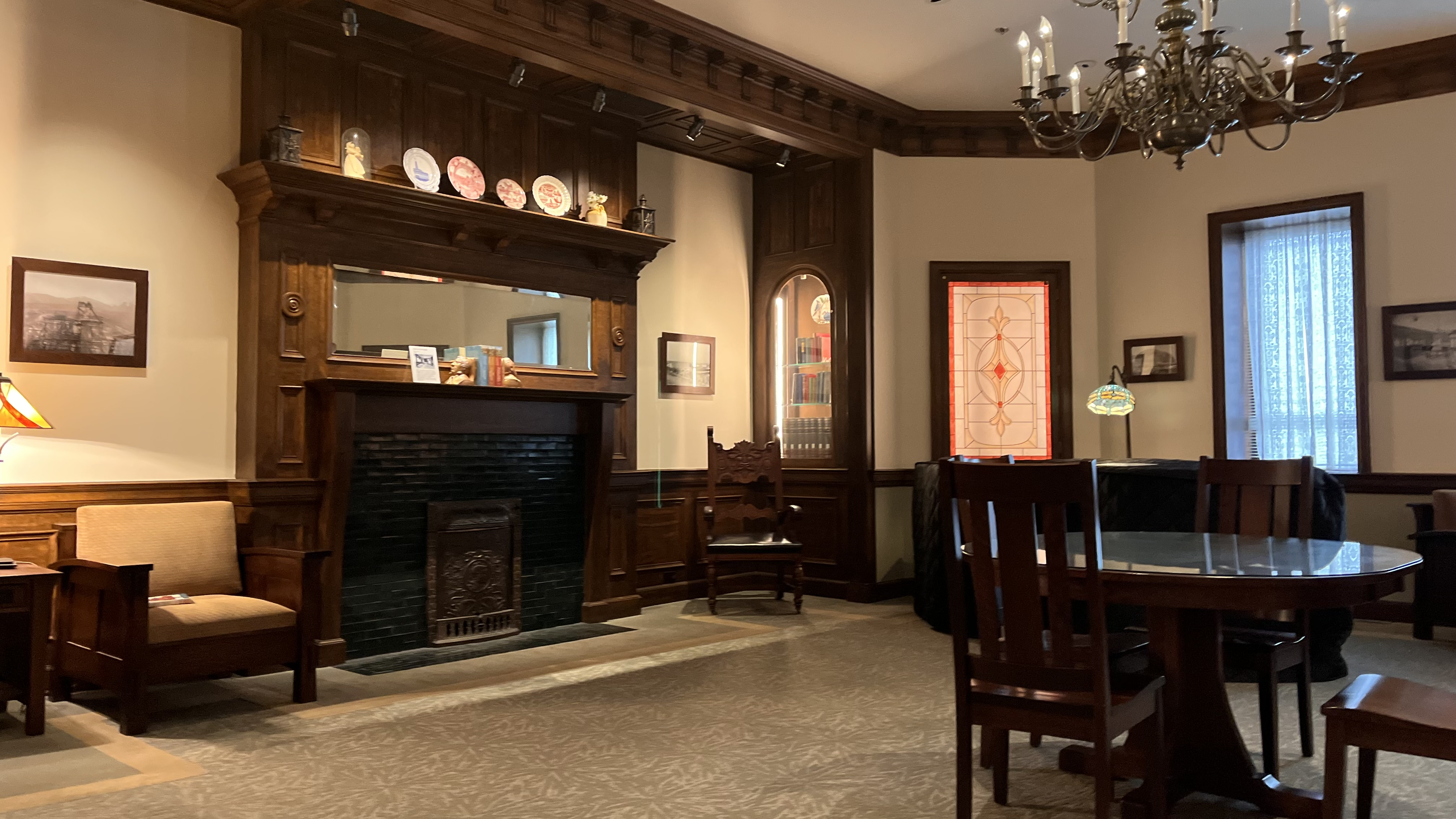
Replica of Bureau of Information Interior, Church History Museum

=== World's Fairs ===
In 1893, the LDS Church participated in the Chicago World Columbian Exposition to counter the negative press it received. The church also participated in World's fairs in Dresden (1930), Chicago (1933–34), San Diego (1935–36), San Francisco (1939–40), and others.

==== 1964 New York World's Fair Mormon Pavilion ====
George Stanley McAllister Jr (1900–1970; a missionary in the church's Eastern States Mission from 1920 to 1923) had the idea for an LDS Pavilion while reading an article in The New York Times on August 10, 1959, about the upcoming 1964 New York World's Fair. As president of the New York Stake in 1961, he approached LDS Church leaders with his idea. This coincided with the creation of the church's publicity department, the Church Information Service (CIS) and a church deficit of $9 million. The church saw it as a good opportunity to proselyte and went forward with the site selection where the church was able to get a place next to one of the entrances. The site was dedicated on March 27, 1963, by George Harding Mortimer JD (1903–1998) with Harold B. Lee, Richard L. Evans and Delbert L. Stapley of Quorum of the Twelve Apostles in attendance. In a stroke of luck for the church, the adjoining site was left empty and Irvin T. Nelson was able to design a garden that later won an award from the American Association of Nurserymen. Overall, 51,607,307 people visited the fair, 6 million visited the LDS Pavilion, and 100,000 copies of the Book of Mormon were sold. The church attributed 1,030 baptisms in 1965 to contacts made through the pavilion.

This was the first time where several themes used in later visitors' centers were introduced including: Thorvaldsen's Christus, Man's Search for Happiness, and missionary tour-guides.

==== Mormon Pavilion at Expo '74 ====
The church had a pavilion modeled after the golden plates made for Expo '74. The local congregation created what was later to be known as the Mormon Expo choir for the event. They performed many times a week for the duration of the Expo and released an album entitled I Love Life. During this time, July 18–26 was designated Mormon Events Week, the Tabernacle Choir the performed in the coliseum on July 18–19 to sold-out audiences. There was a large celebration on July 24 to commemorate Pioneer Day. The program featured church president, Spencer W. Kimball, and various dance performances from local youth. A special edition of the Book of Mormon was printed with a gold cover for the event.

=== Advent of the visitors' center ===
After the positive reception at the 1964 New York World's Fair, the church began to mirror visitors' centers similar to the Mormon Pavilion. Aspects from the design were piloted on Temple Square and then later used in visitors' centers at the Los Angeles California, Mesa Arizona, and Laie Hawaii temples, as well as Liberty Jail in Liberty, Missouri, and the Joseph Smith Birthplace Memorial in Sharon, Vermont.

==== Christmas lights on Temple Square ====
The LDS Church began its annual tradition of lighting Temple Square with Christmas lights in 1965. The first years included life-size displays of the manger and the inn, performances of Gian Carlo Menotti's Amahl and the Night Visitors, and a one night performance of Handel's Messiah. The tradition spread to other temples including the Washington D. C. Temple in 1978 and Los Angeles in 1979. Church meetinghouses around the world began to similar Christmas lighting programs around the same time.

== Common elements ==
=== Christus Replica ===
This section only deals with the Christus as used by the LDS Church. For a complete history see Christus (statue).

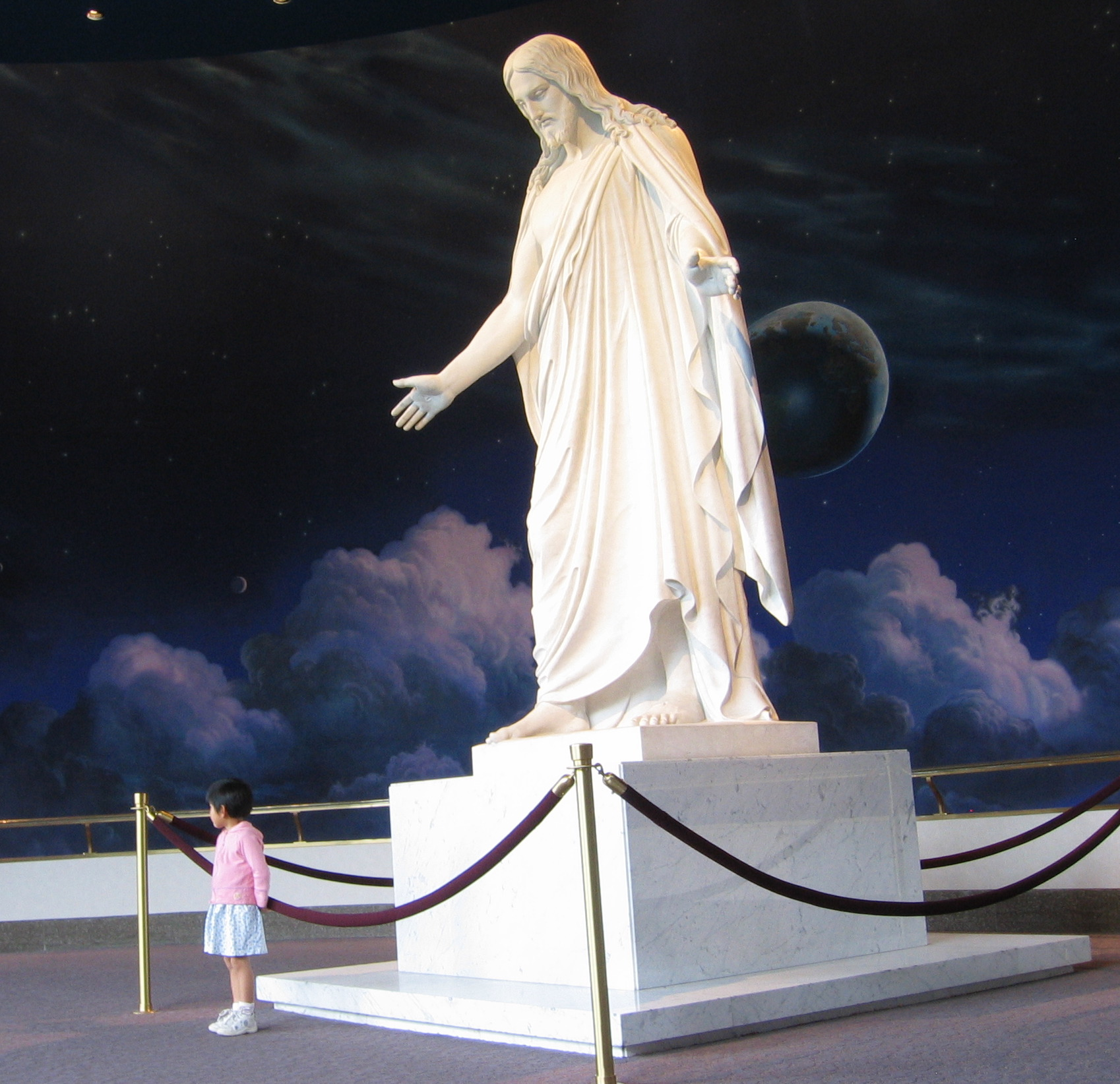
A child standing in front of a replica of Thorvaldsen's Christus in the North Visitors Center on Temple Square.

The LDS Church's first replica of Thorvaldsen's Christus was a gift to the church by Stephen L Richards and placed in the North Visitors' Center. Richards first saw the statue in Forest Lawn Memorial Park in Glendale, California and later saw the original in Copenhagen, Denmark in September 1950. In meetings around the construction of a new bureau of information and creation of a tour of Temple Square, he suggested that a copy of the Christus would clearly show that church members believe in Jesus Christ. The statue was originally planned to be left outdoors, but because of concerns that the marble would deteriorate the statue was moved to the rotunda of the North Visitors' Center.

Richards worked with Hubert Lewright Eaton (1891–1966) at Forest Lawn Memorial Park to commission a replica made by the workshop of Rebechi Aldo & Gualtiero in Pietrasanta, Italy from white Torrone Marble. The statue was finished in January 1959, Richards died on May 19, and the statue arrived in Salt Lake City in June. The replica was 11 feet 1/4 inch tall, weighed 12,000 lbs., and cost $10,000. The statue was the focal point in the design of Temple Square's North Visitors' Center.

Before the North Visitors' Center was completed, the church considered incorporating the statue into the 1964 New York World's Fair Mormon Pavilion. However, because the costs were so similar, the church had Rebechi Aldo & Gualtiero create another copy. Initially some people were concerned that the statue would be worshipped as an Icon, but the fears were assuaged by people's behavior during the world fair. After the fair, the statue was slated to end up in Joseph Smith Birthplace Memorial, but ended up in the Los Angeles California Temple's Visitors' Center.

Another smaller statue was commissioned for Expo '70 and after the fair was shipped to the visitors' center at the Hamilton New Zealand Temple. Between 1979 and 1988, four more copies were made for visitors' centers in temples in Laie, Hawaii, Mesa, Arizona, Mexico City, and Washington D.C. In 1990, 3-D Art, a fiberglass company in Kearns, Utah was asked by the church's Missionary Department to make a lighter weight replica of the Christus. The first was sent to the Oakland California Temple Visitors' Center in 1992. The fiberglass process was then used to make a traveling model that is sent around the world for temple open houses. Over time the statue became a clear symbol of the LDS Church and is used frequently in its visitors' centers.

On April 4, 2020, church president Russell M. Nelson announced the Christus would become a part of the church's official symbol to emphasize "the centrality of the Savior."

=== Exhibits ===
The first use of museum-like exhibits was in the 1964 New York World's Fair Mormon Pavilion. After the end of the World's Fair, the exhibits were taken and modified to fit visitors centers in temples in Los Angeles, California, Laie, Hawaii, and Mesa, Arizona; along with Temple Square, Liberty Jail, and the Joseph Smith Birthplace Memorial. Outdoor signs and advertisements were also made.

The first visitors' center with completely bilingual exhibits is at the Mesa Arizona Temple.

=== Theaters ===
==== Films ====
The first film to be used in a visitors' center was Man's Search for Happiness. The proselyting film explains the doctrines around Plan of Salvation and seeks to provide answers to the questions, "Where do I come from?" "What is the purpose of life?" and "Where do I go after I die?"

==== Musical performances ====
Musical performances play a significant role in the culture of the church. Musical performances were held in every major place that the church had its members from its organization to the present day. Musical performances were and are held in the Salt Lake Tabernacle.

== Temple visitors' centers ==
=== Hamilton New Zealand Temple ===
The visitors' center was closed in 2018 and replaced by the Church History Centre and Museum. Jacinda Ardern, the former Prime Minister of New Zealand, grew up around the Hamilton Temple and visitors' center.

=== Idaho Falls Temple ===
The Idaho Falls Temple Visitors' Center was originally a repurposed tool shed where tours of the temple construction site were coordinated from 1945 to 1960. The building was replaced by a bureau of information dedicated by Henry D. Moyle on May 15, 1960. The visitors' center was remodeled and expanded in 1983 to add two new theaters and exhibit rooms to teach about the Book of Mormon and Solomon's Temple.

The center hosts guided tours and was named a 2022 TripAdvisor Travelers' Choice award winner. The visitors center has replica of the Christus, an exhibit about the teachings of the church's presidents, an exhibit about the purpose of temples, an exhibit called Temple by the River explaining a gallery with rotating exhibits, and a movie theater. The visitors center was rededicated by L. Tom Perry March 21, 2008. The center hosted the Reflections of Christ traveling exhibit in May 2011.

=== Los Angeles Temple Visitors Center ===
The Los Angeles Temple Bureau of Information began operating in the spring of 1955. It turned into a visitors' center after a remodel after May 1966 where museums style exhibits were added. The artwork and displays added were estimated at the time to cost $260,000. The visitors' center includes a replica of the Christus statue carved by Aldo Rebachi for the 1964 New York World's Fair Mormon Pavilion.

On March 9, 2020, the visitors' center hosted the fourth annual Women-In-Diplomacy Day with Reyna I. Aburto as the keynote speaker.

=== London England Temple ===
The London England Temple Visitors' Center was first dedicated in 1969 by John Longden. The center was renovated and rededicated in 2008, and then subsequently changed to a waiting area at the end of 2017.

=== Mesa Arizona Temple ===
The Mesa Arizona Temple Visitors' Center was most recently renovated in 2021. This redesign was tailored to fit the needs of the young adults in the area using several surveys and focus groups. This is the first visitors' center where all of the exhibits are in English and Spanish. The redesign includes kitchens, meditation pods, and gathering rooms. The center has exhibits that show the growth of the church in the White, Native American, and Hispanic communities while following the story of one of several people who belong to those communities. The center also has a scale model of the Mesa Arizona Temple, coloring walls, and a play area for children.

=== Oakland California Temple ===
The visitors' center offers tours by missionaries in 10 languages. The temple and visitors' center is rated as Trip Advisor's best thing to do in Oakland.

=== Portland Oregon Temple ===
The Portland Oregon Temple Visitors' Center is the only one located in the Pacific Northwest. It is located in a former Distribution Center (which was closed due to the opening of a nearby Deseret Book). The center was opened in 2012 and features a small movie theater, a Christus statue replica, and four displays. It contains both interior and exterior restrooms.

Every December, the center hosts multiple Christmas concerts throughout the month.

=== Rome Italy Temple ===
The Rome Italy Temple Visitors' Center sits on a 15 acre-lot that also includes the temple, meetinghouse, FHC, and gardens.

One of the focal points of the center is a life size replica of the Christus, with the accompanying statues of the original apostles carved out of Carrara marble. This is the same marble used to create the Parthenon, Pietà, and David. Behind the statues, Joseph Brickley painted a mural.

The dedication of the temple and the visitors' center was the first time in history that all 15 members of the First Presidency and Quorum of the Twelve Apostles were in the same place outside of the United States.

=== São Paulo Brazil Temple ===
The São Paulo Brazil Temple Visitors' Center was the first in South America. It was converted from patron housing and opened in January 2019. There are several exhibits, including one which chronicles the history of the church in Brazil. As in most temple visitors' centers there is a replica of Thorvaldsen's Christus.

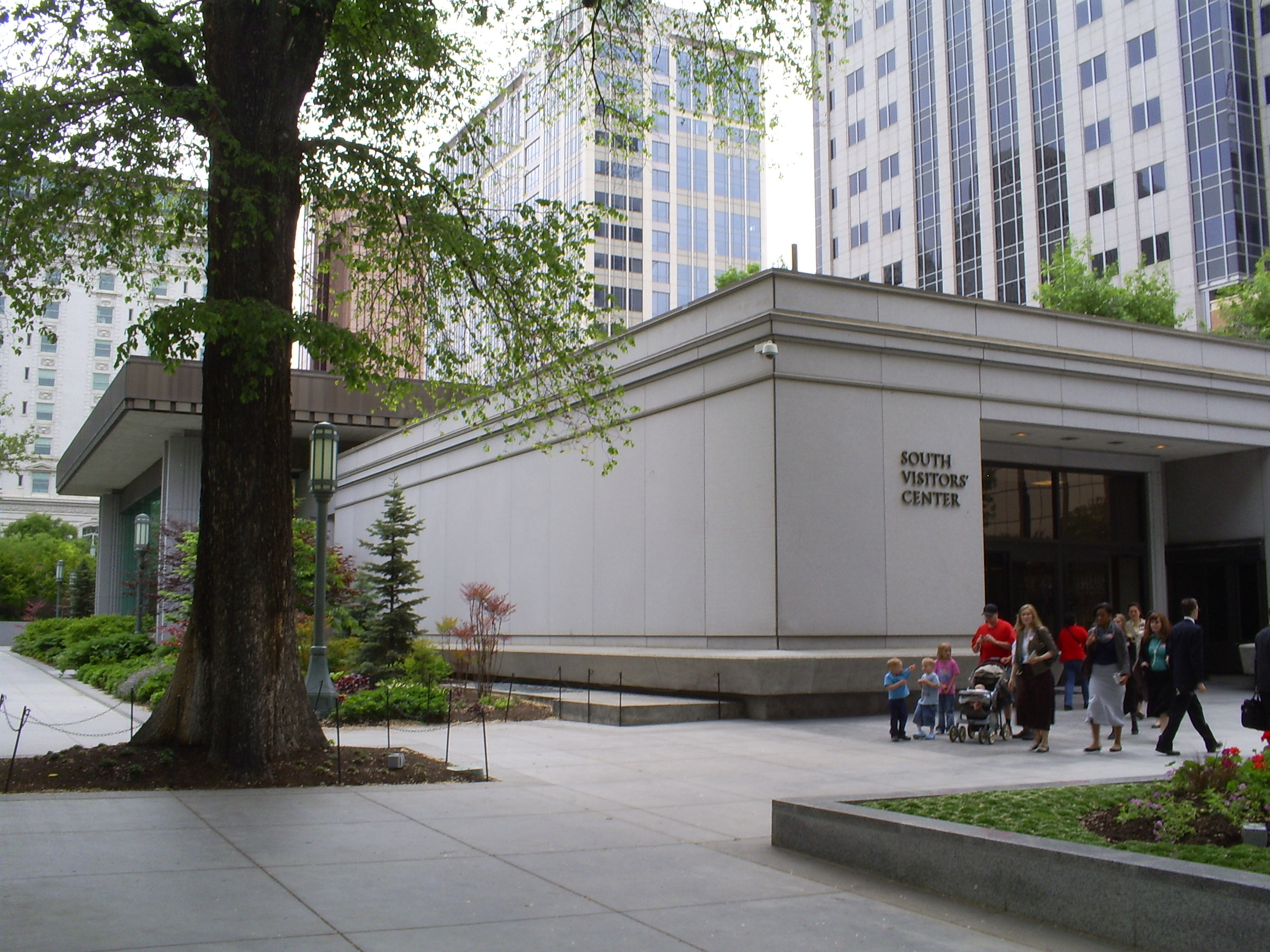
The South Visitors' Center at Temple Square

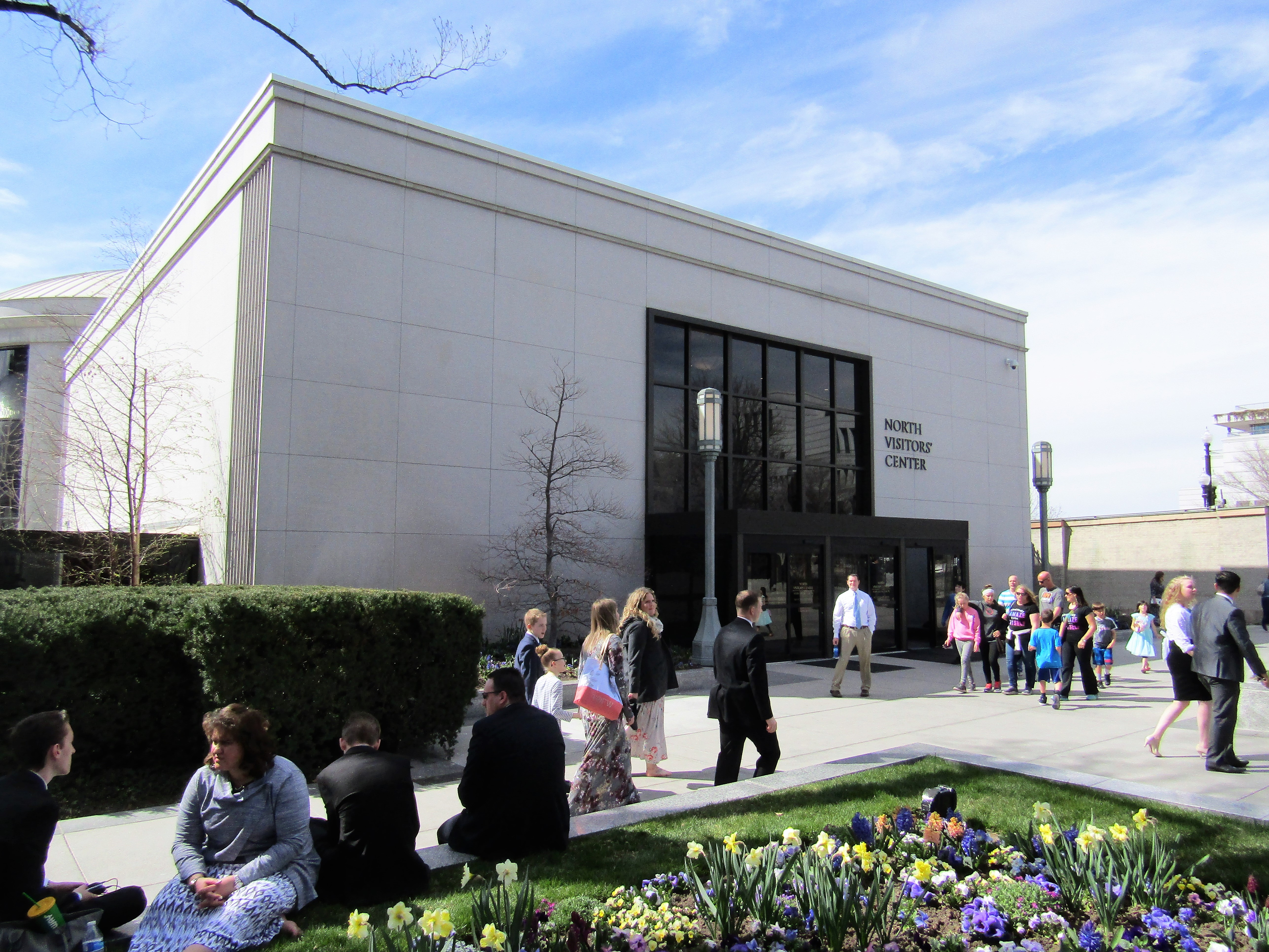
The North Visitors' Center at Temple Square

=== Salt Lake Temple visitors' centers and Temple Square ===
This is not a complete treatment of the Salt Lake Temple and Temple Square. For more information see those pages.

==== North Visitors' Center ====
In 1968, the North Visitors' Center was dedicated as part of efforts to make the area more appealing to visitors. It contained several murals and displays with its main attraction being a copy of Thorvaldsen's Christus in a rotunda painted with a mural of the universe by Sidney King. Other murals included a reproduction and expansion of a mural depicting Christ's ministry from the New York World's Fair Mormon Pavilion by Sidney King.

==== South Visitors' Center ====
In 1978, the Bureau of Information building was replaced by the South Visitors' Center.

==== Temple Square renovations ====
In 2019, the Salt Lake Temple was closed for renovations. The new design was made to incorporate Temple Square and the Church Office Building plaza. The area adjacent to the Church Office Building was designed to be a "contemplative garden space."

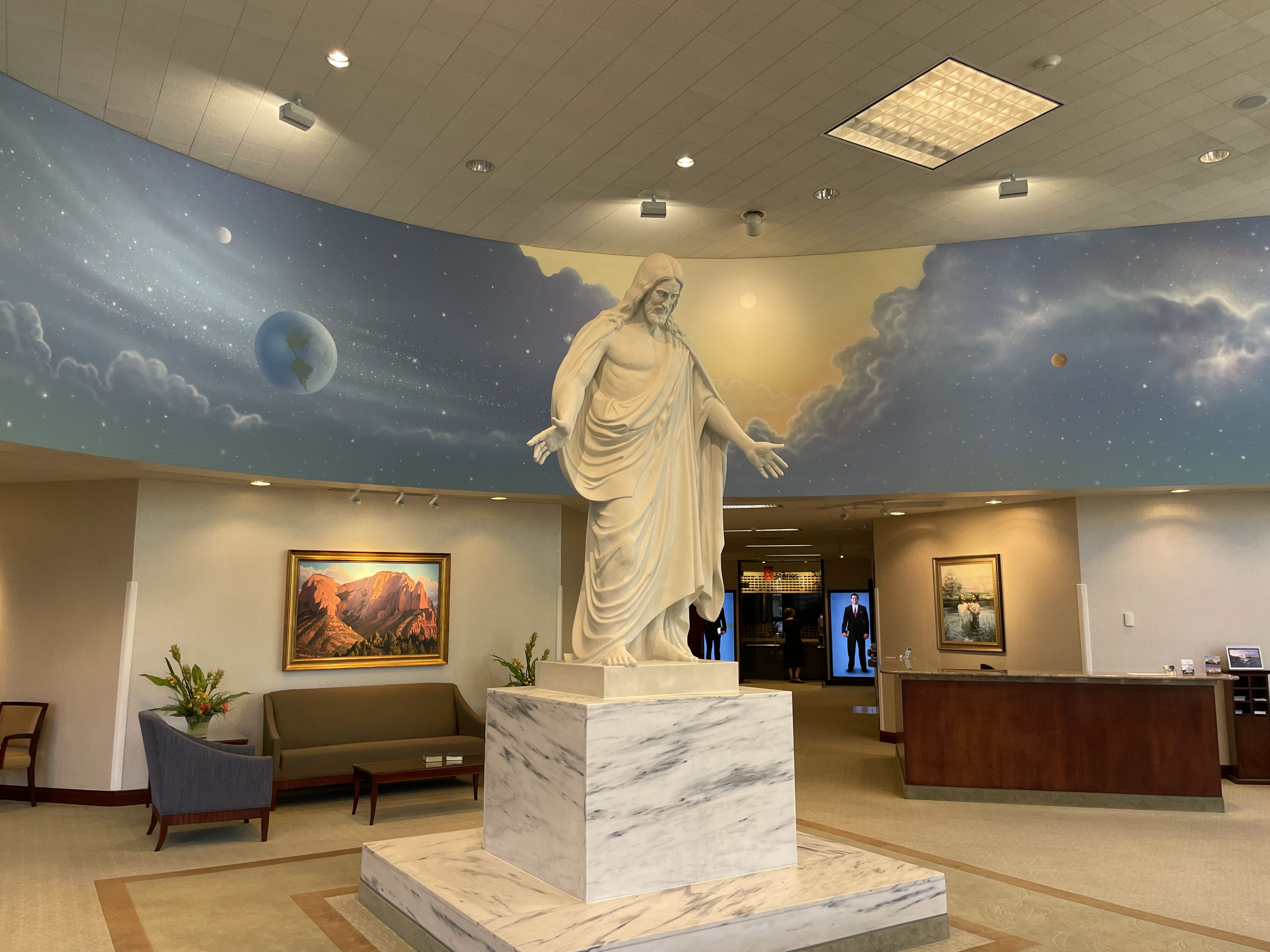
The interior of the St. George Utah Temple Visitors' Center

=== St. George Utah Temple ===
The St. George Utah Temple Visitors' Center is located to the southeast of the temple.

=== Tokyo Japan Temple ===
The Tokyo Japan Temple Visitors' Center opened January 5, 2022 as part of the temple's renovation which began in 2017. The visitors center has two floors. The first floor gallery shows pictures of the inside of the temple and the second floor gallery is focused on the life and teachings of Jesus Christ. The annex that houses the visitors' center also contains a chapel, a mission office, and FHC.

=== Washington D.C. Temple ===
The Washington D.C. Temple Visitors' Center has interactive exhibits and a scale model of the temple.

== Church historic sites ==
This is a list of all the church historic site visitors' centers.

Church Historic Sites Visitors Centers
Name	Location
Hill Cumorah Visitors' Center	Palmyra, New York
Historic Kirtland, Ohio Visitors' Center	Kirtland, Ohio
Independence, Missouri Visitors' Center	Independence, Missouri
Nauvoo, Illinois Visitors' Center	Nauvoo, Illinois
Whitmer Farm: Church Organization site	Fayette, New York
Grandin Building	Palmyra, New York
Priesthood Restoration Site	Oakland, Pennsylvania
Joseph Smith Birthplace Visitors Center	Sharon, Vermont
Morley Farm	Kirtland, Ohio
Johnson Home	Hiram, Ohio
Liberty Jail	Liberty, Missouri
Hawn's Mill	Braymer, Missouri
Adam-ondi-ahman	Jameson, Missouri
Carthage Jail	Carthage, Illinois
Kanesville Tabernacle	Council Bluffs, Iowa
Mount Pisgah	Thayer, Iowa
Mormon Trail Center at Historic Winter Quarters	Omaha, Nebraska
Martin's Cove Mormon Trail Site	Alcova, Wyoming
Sixth Crossing: Mormon Trail Site	Lander, Wyoming
Rock Creek Hollow Mormon Trail Site	Lander, Wyoming
Beehive House	Temple Square
Cove Fort	Beaver, Utah
Brigham Young Winter Home and Office	St. George, Utah
St. George Tabernacle	St. George, Utah
Jacob Hamblin House	Santa Clara, Utah
Mormon Battalion Historic Site	San Diego, California
Pine Valley Chapel and Tithing Office	Pine Valley, Utah
Bear Lake Stake Tabernacle	Paris, Idaho
Historic Cody Mural Chapel	Cody, Wyoming

== Other visitors' centers ==
=== Church History Centre and Museum ===
The Church History Centre and Museum was built as part of renovations during the closure of the Church College of New Zealand.

=== Hyde Park Chapel ===
The Hyde Park Chapel in London is a chapel bought after World War II and The Blitz destroyed parts of London. It is currently used as a chapel for three wards (Hyde Park 1st, Hyde Park 2nd, and the London YSA Ward), Family History Center, stake center for the London England Hyde Park Stake, and visitors' center.

=== Park City Family Tree Center ===
The Park City Family Tree Center was located on 531 Main St in Park City, Utah. It opened as an amenity for the 2002 Winter Olympics and stayed open to serve the community around the Sundance Film Festival every January. It had a full-sized realistic tree with computer workstations. The center closed in 2018. The church sold the property for $2.6 million in 2021.
