= William Marks (Latter Day Saints) =

American Mormon leader (1792–1872)

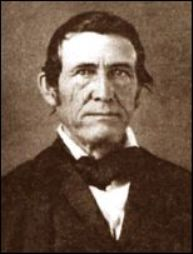

First counselor in the First Presidency of the Reorganized Church of Jesus Christ of Latter Day Saints
- April 6, 1863 – May 22, 1872
- Called by: Joseph Smith III
- Reason: Reorganization of church with Joseph Smith III as prophet–president
- End reason: William W. Blair

Personal details
- Born: November 15, 1792; Rutland, Vermont, U.S.
- Died: May 22, 1872 (aged 79); Plano, Illinois, U.S.
- Resting place: Dekalb, Illinois, U.S.
- Spouse(s): Rosannah Robinson; Julia Ann Durfee

William Marks (November 15, 1792 – May 22, 1872) was an early leader in the Latter Day Saint movement and was a member of the First Presidency in the Reorganized Church of Jesus Christ of Latter Day Saints (now Community of Christ). Marks is mentioned in the Doctrine and Covenants in sections 117 and 124 of the Church of Jesus Christ of Latter-day Saints (LDS Church) edition and in section 115 of the Community of Christ edition.

== Early life ==
Marks was born in Rutland, Vermont, on November 15, 1792 to Cornwall (or Cornell) Marks and Sarah Goodrich. He married Rosannah Robinson on May 2, 1813, and was the father of five children.

== Early church membership ==
Marks was baptized a member of Church of Christ sometime in April 1835 in New York and ordained a priest shortly thereafter. He was ordained an elder on June 3, 1836. Partly due to the lack of records available on his baptism, Marks was rebaptized in proxy by the LDS Church on January 29, 1965.

In September 1837, Marks was appointed to the High Council at Kirtland, Ohio, and agent of the Messenger and Advocate when Joseph Smith and others fled Ohio under mob pressure. Marks was appointed by revelation (D&C 117) to leave Ohio and move to Far West, Missouri, to preside over the body of Saints. However, before he arrived, the Mormons were expelled from the state under the "Extermination Order" signed into law by Lilburn W. Boggs.

Marks was also seen in vision by Joseph Smith, according to Smith’s own record on March 29, 1838. Smith wrote that he saw Marks:

"... closely pursued by an innumerable concourse of enemies, who pressed upon him hard; and when they were about to devour him, and had seemingly obtained some degree of advantage over him, a chariot of fire came, and near the place, even the angel of the Lord, put forth his hand upon Bro. Marks and said unto him: 'Thou art my son, come here.' And immediately he was caught up in the chariot and rode away triumphantly out of their midst. And again the Lord said, 'I will raise thee up for a blessing unto many people.'"

== Leadership in Nauvoo ==
When the Saints arrived in Commerce, Illinois, in 1839, Marks was appointed as president of the church's Commerce Stake. (He later was president of the Nauvoo Stake). He served in that position until 1844.

He was also elected as a Nauvoo municipal alderman and as one of the regents of the University of the City of Nauvoo in February 1841, and was a founder of the Nauvoo Agricultural and Manufacturing Association. He was appointed by revelation (D&C 124) to contribute to and be on the Nauvoo House committee, and served as landlord of the Mansion House.

As stake president, he assisted in the laying of the cornerstones of the Nauvoo Temple in April 1841. He was initiated into Masonry in April 1842 and received his endowment on May 4, 1842, as a member of the Council of Fifty.

Although a close friend of Joseph Smith, Marks occasionally found himself at odds with the prophet. Smith presented evidence of why Sidney Rigdon should be rejected as first counselor in the First Presidency of the church during the October 1843 General Conference. He accused Rigdon, a long-time friend of Marks, as having lost his "integrity and steadfastness" and stated that he had no confidence in Rigdon's abilities as a leader in the church or as his counselor. Regardless of these accusations, Marks motioned that Rigdon remain in his station as a counselor in the First Presidency. Rigdon was sustained to the position by the membership of the church. After the vote, Smith stood and stated, "I have thrown him off my shoulders and you have again put him on me, you may carry him, but I will not." Because Rigdon was rejected by Smith, most of the core leadership of the church, including members of the Council of Fifty and Anointed Quorum, questioned Rigdon's standing and authority and, later, his claim to succeed Smith as head of the church. Rigdon and Marks were also known opponents of plural marriage. Those who supported this controversial practice instituted by Smith saw such dissent as disloyal.

Smith also spoke at the funeral of Marks's son. Among his remarks he said:

"I never felt more solemn. It calls to mind the death of my oldest brother [Alvin], who died in New York, and my youngest brother, [Don] Carloss Smith who died in Nauvoo…. It will be but a short time before we shall all in like manner be called. It may be the case with me as well as you. Some have supposed that Br[other] Joseph could not die, but this is a mistake. It is true there ha[ve] been times when I have had the promise of my life to accomplish such-and-such things, but, having accomplish[ed] those things, I have not at present any lease [on] my life. I am as liable to die as other men."

This funerary sermon is considered one of the most introspective and emotionally depressed discourses by Smith, and pointed to by Mormons as foreknowledge and a prophecy of his own death which occurred not long thereafter.

In the weeks before Joseph Smith's death, Marks claimed that Joseph came to him and told him that plural marriage had proved a curse rather than a blessing to the church. Smith wanted to take decisive steps to end the practice, but, according to Marks, time ran out. Other purported pieces of evidence, such as Joseph's burning of the polygamy revelation and destroying his temple garments, seem to support Marks's story. Not all members of the church hierarchy believed Marks's testimony, though Quinn believes that Brigham Young gave credence to it, as he later said that if Joseph "had followed the Spirit of revelation in him he never would have gone to Carthage". Ironically, Joseph Smith III later would not believe Marks, either, since Marks implicated Joseph Smith III's father in polygamy.

== Issues with apostolic succession ==
At the time of the death of Joseph Smith, much of the leadership of the church had been campaigning for Smith’s candidacy for President of the United States. Marks, as landlord of the Nauvoo Mansion, oversaw some of the funerary preparations for the burial of Joseph and his brother, Hyrum.

According to William Clayton's diary, Emma Smith supported Marks as the successor to her husband. According to Smith, Marks had a right to church succession as the High Council President, which she asserted was equal in authority to the Quorum of the Twelve and the First Presidency. Furthermore, she felt that while apostles had authority in unorganized parts of the church, they did not have authority in the stake of Zion, Nauvoo. This reasoning was one of many interpretations put forward by various factions in the months after Smith's death.

Historian D. Michael Quinn claims that, despite the foregoing, church succession in Nauvoo revolved around one central issue: plural marriage. Quinn maintains that Marks's known opposition to plural marriage was a crucial issue. He also argues that, although a small group of church leaders almost approved Marks as the next church president, by July 10, 1844, Willard Richards—one the Church's Twelve Apostles—delayed all action until Quorum President Brigham Young returned from the presidential campaign. Young and the majority of the Quorum of the Twelve, Quinn asserts, feared that Marks would end plural marriage and other ordinances that they saw as crucial to exaltation in the afterlife.

Quinn states that, despite Emma's support, and despite receiving his endowments and anointings before any other successor claimants (including every member of the Quorum of Twelve), Marks did not advance his own claims to church leadership. Instead, Marks sympathized with Sidney Rigdon and supported his bid to become "guardian" of the church. Because of this and because he did not support the Twelve Apostles, Marks was removed from the High Council at the October General Conference in on October 7, 1844, and also rejected as president of the Nauvoo Stake of Zion. Patriarch John Smith, an uncle of Joseph's, was chosen as Marks's successor. Despite Brigham Young's desire to see Marks excommunicated, the Nauvoo High Council refused his request. Marks never became excommunicated. After several opponents of the Quorum of Twelve Apostles were terrorized by Nauvoo policemen, William Marks left Nauvoo in February 1845. Brigham Young observed that "Bro. Marks had gone without being whittled out"—a reference to a tactic of surrounding an opponent with adult men who whistled and whittled without saying a word to the opponent. Young and Marks never reconciled after this.

== RLDS involvement ==
After the exodus of Young's followers to Utah, Marks became convinced that Sidney Rigdon’s claims of leadership were unfounded, and he joined the Strangite movement, later becoming a counselor to James Strang in the Strangite First Presidency. Marks left the Strangites between 1853 and 1855, loosely affiliating himself with other Latter Day Saint denominations. During this time he associated with Zenas H. Gurley, Jason W. Briggs, and William W. Blair. The four were convinced that succession in the presidency of the church must be lineal, descending from father to son, and promoted the idea of a Reorganized Church of Jesus Christ of Latter Day Saints. Between 1853 and 1859 they approached Joseph Smith III dozens of times to convince him to take leadership of the RLDS movement, which he eventually did.

On June 11, 1859, Marks was formally received as a member of the RLDS movement without rebaptism. Alongside Zenas Gurley, he presided over the conference in April 1860, wherein Marks aided Gurley in ordaining Joseph Smith III as president of the high priesthood in the newly incorporated Reorganized Church of Jesus Christ of Latter Day Saints.

According to Joseph Smith III in March 1863, "a revelation was received directing the church to call and ordain William Marks to be a Counselor to the President of the church, in order that the Quorum [of the First Presidency] might be more perfectly prepared to discharge the duties devolving upon it." This revelation was presented to the April 1863 General Conference of the RLDS Church and canonized as Doctrine and Covenants Section 115. Marks' ordination took place at the same conference, joining Joseph Smith III and Jason W. Briggs in the RLDS First Presidency.

In 1866, Marks was appointed to the committee to receive manuscripts from Joseph Smith’s widow, Emma Smith Bidamon, and print the Joseph Smith Translation of the Bible.

Marks was first counselor in the First Presidency of the Reorganized Church until his death in Plano, Illinois, on May 22, 1872. A marked grave bearing his name is located in the Shabbona Grove Cemetery at Shabbona Grove, DeKalb, Illinois, adjacent to that of his wife Rosannah Robinson Marks, who died on October 18, 1862. Marks had married a second time in 1866 to Julia Ann Durfee, who survived him.

== Notes ==
Community of Christ titles
Preceded by Sidney Rigdon	First counselor in the First Presidency; 6 April 6, 1863–May 22, 1872	Succeeded by William W. Blair
