= Children of Joseph Smith =

The children of Joseph Smith Jr., the founder of the Latter Day Saint movement, and his wife Emma Smith, are historically significant because of their roles in establishing and leading the Latter Day Saint Movement, which includes the Church of Jesus Christ of Latter-day Saints (LDS Church), the Reorganized Church of Jesus Christ of Latter Day Saints (RLDS Church, since 2001 called Community of Christ), The Church of Jesus Christ (Bickertonite), the Church of Christ (Temple Lot) and several other sects. Some Latter Day Saint sects, including the RLDS, believed that leadership of the church would follow lineal succession of Smith's descendants. In 1860, Joseph Smith III became the prophet and president of the RLDS Church, succeeded by his sons. The Community of Christ no longer holds to this practice. The larger LDS Church did not follow the practice, and it was led after Joseph Smith's death by Brigham Young.

Joseph Smith taught the doctrine of plural marriage as found in the Old Testament but also publicly condemned polygamy not under the laws of God. There is evidence that Smith both taught and practiced it, and had a number of wives sealed to him. Several women later testified that they were wives in the full sense of the word. Emily D. P. Partidge said she "roomed" with him, and Melissa Lott Willes testified that she was his wife "in very deed". Though there were allegations of paternity in some of these polygamous marriages, ongoing genetic research of descendants of these plural marriages has been negative. These are the nine biological children of Emma and Joseph Smith, four of whom survived to adulthood, and the two children they adopted:

== Joseph and Emma Hale Smith family ==
Child	Lifespan	Notes
Alvin Smith	June 15, 1828	Born with un-described birth defects
Thaddeus Smith	April 30, 1831	Twin of Louisa, premature, died within a few hours of their birth
Louisa Smith	April 30, 1831	Twin of Thaddeus, premature, died within a few hours of their birth
Joseph Murdock Smith*	April 30, 1831 – March 29, 1832 (age 10 months)	*Adopted. Twin of Julia, birth son of Julia Clapp Murdock and John Murdock who upon his wife's death in childbirth gave the infants to the Smiths for adoption. Died from exposure (many accounts say pneumonia) following a mob attack on the Smith home on the night of March 24, 1832.
Julia Murdock Smith*	April 30, 1831 – September 12, 1880 (aged 49)	*Adopted. Twin of Joseph, birth daughter of Julia Clapp Murdock and John Murdock
Joseph Smith III	November 6, 1832 – December 10, 1914 (aged 82)	Prophet-President of the Reorganized Church of Jesus Christ of Latter Day Saints (RLDS), opponent of polygamy
Frederick Granger Williams Smith	June 20, 1836 – April 13, 1862 (aged 25)	Frederick married Anna Marie Jones on November 13, 1857. On November 27, 1858, a daughter, Alice Fredericka Smith, was born in Nauvoo. Alice never had any children.
Alexander Hale Smith	June 2, 1838 – August 12, 1909 (aged 71)	Senior leader of the RLDS Church, opponent of polygamy
Don Carlos Smith	June 13, 1840 – September 15, 1841 (age 14 months)	
Unnamed Son Smith	February 6, 1842	Stillborn
David Hyrum Smith	November 17, 1844 – August 29, 1904 (aged 59)	born after Smith's death, active in the RLDS Church, opponent of polygamy

== See also ==
- List of Joseph Smith's wives#Allegations of children born to polygamous wives
- Community of Christ
- Category:Lists of children by person
