= Julia Murdock Smith =

Daughter of Joseph and Emma Hale Smith of the Latter Day Saint movement (1831–1880)

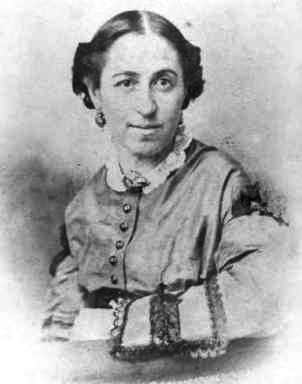
- Born: Julia Murdock; May 1, 1831; Kirtland, Ohio, US
- Died: September 12, 1880 (aged 49); Nauvoo, Illinois, US
- Resting place: Saints Peter and Paul Cemetery; 40°33′2.88″N 91°21′38.88″W
- Spouses: Elisha Dixon (m. 1848–1853) John J. Middleton (m. 1858–1876)
- Parent(s): Born to: John Murdock and Julia Clapp; Adopted by: Joseph Smith, Jr. and Emma Hale Smith
- Website: Julia M. S. D. Middleton

Julia Murdock Smith Dixon Middleton (May 1, 1831 – September 12, 1880) was an early member of the Latter Day Saint movement and the eldest surviving child and only daughter of Joseph Smith and Emma Hale Smith. She was adopted by the Smiths.

Her birth mother died giving birth to Julia and her twin brother Joseph, so their birth father John Murdock offered them to Smith and his wife, who themselves had lost prematurely born twins the same day. After Joseph and Emma Smith had taken custody of the children, in late March 1832, the infant Joseph became ill. Consequently Emma decided to have the babies sleep separately to prevent a spread of the disease. Joseph Smith had taken baby Joseph to bed with him and Emma was in the other room with Julia. That night a mob came and stormed the Smith home. In the midst of the panic, baby Joseph was exposed to the cold air and died several days later.

After the death of Joseph Smith, Julia and her surviving four brothers remained in Nauvoo, Illinois, with their mother Emma. In 1848, at seventeen, Julia eloped with an older man Elisha Dixon, and the couple married in Nauvoo. They moved to Texas so he could work on a steamboat. In 1851, Dixon was injured in a steamboat accident. He died, probably in 1853, as a result of these injuries. Julia returned to Nauvoo and lived with her mother until November 19, 1856, when she married John J. Middleton, a local farmer. They moved to St Louis Missouri shortly after that for employment. It was a difficult time for his employment and their marriage. Middleton was a devout Catholic, and Julia was baptized into the Catholic Church on November 9, 1857.

In 1876, Julia moved back to Nauvoo after her husband left her and went west. She lived with her mother at the Riverside Mansion, the brick home Emma's second husband Major Lewis C. Bidamon had built. Emma's health failed early in 1879, and Julia was with her, as were Joseph III and Alexander, when she died on April 30, 1879. After Emma's death, Julia went home with Alexander to Andover, Missouri. She died of breast cancer, at age 49 on September 12, 1880.

== Obituary ==
MIDDLETON—At the residence of Jas. Moffitt Jr. in township, Set. 10th 1880, Mrs. Julia, wife of John Middleton, in her 50th year, of breast cancer.

The deceased was born at Warrensville, O., in May, 1831, and many phases of her life from almost the day of her birth have borne as near the sembalance of romance as facts could well admit of, which, it will not be a miss to mention here.

She was a twin, and the daughter of a Mr. and Mrs. Murdock of the above named place, who were neighbors of Joseph and Emma Smith of subsequent Mormon fame. Within a few hours of the birth of the Murdock twins Mrs. Smith also became the mother of a pair of twins, which shortly died. Mrs. Murdock also died, when Mr. and Mrs. Smith took and adopted her twins. Some time after that one of the adopted children died. Julia continued to live in the Smith family and came here with them at the time of the Mormon immigration. She was kindly cared for and educated by the Smiths and at the age of seventeen engaged to marry a man named Dixon, which met the objection of her foster-mother—Mr. Smith having been killed before that time. But as in most of other cases, where love yields not to dictation, she left home and married the man of her choice. But after a few years she was compelled to wear the weeds of widowhood—her husband died—when she returned home where she remained till her marriage with Mr. John Middleton in 1856.

Mrs. Middleton was a woman of the most exemplary character—an advocate of all the graces and virtues and had a strong loving disposition for her friends which firmly endeared her to them. She was considerably above the medium of intelligence and of an indomitable spirit which fully manifested itself in the trying ordeal of sickness through which she passed before the severance of the link which bound her to this earthly sphere. Although she knew that death was fast approaching she remained cheerful and resigned. She leaves many friends who deeply regret her death."

— Nauvoo Independent, September 17, 1880.
