= Joseph Smith Mansion House =

House in Nauvoo, Illinois, United States

Coordinates: 40.54098°N 91.39137°W

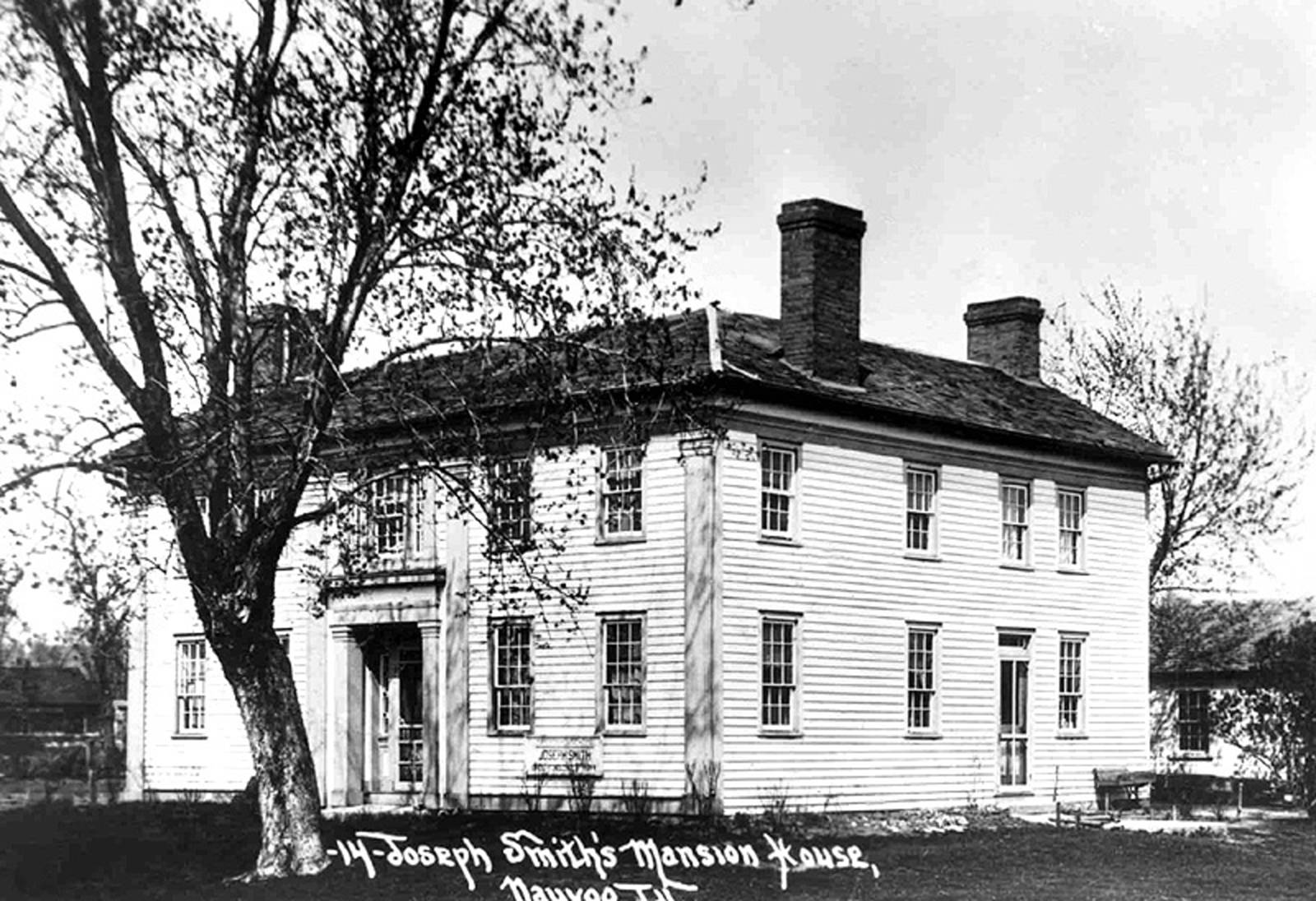
Mansion House, early-20th century

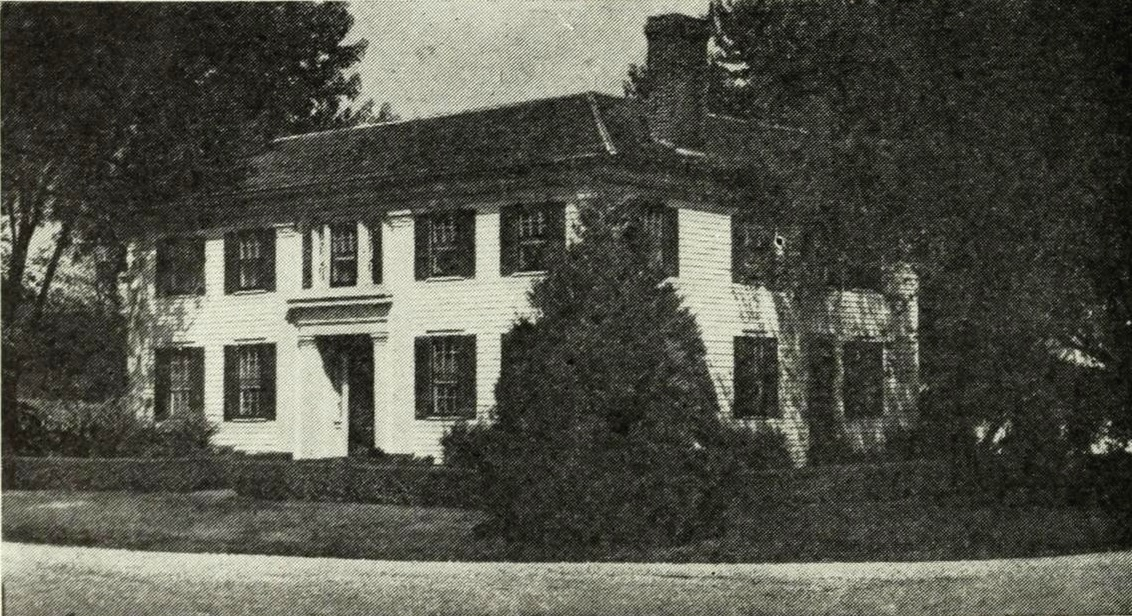
Mansion House in 1946

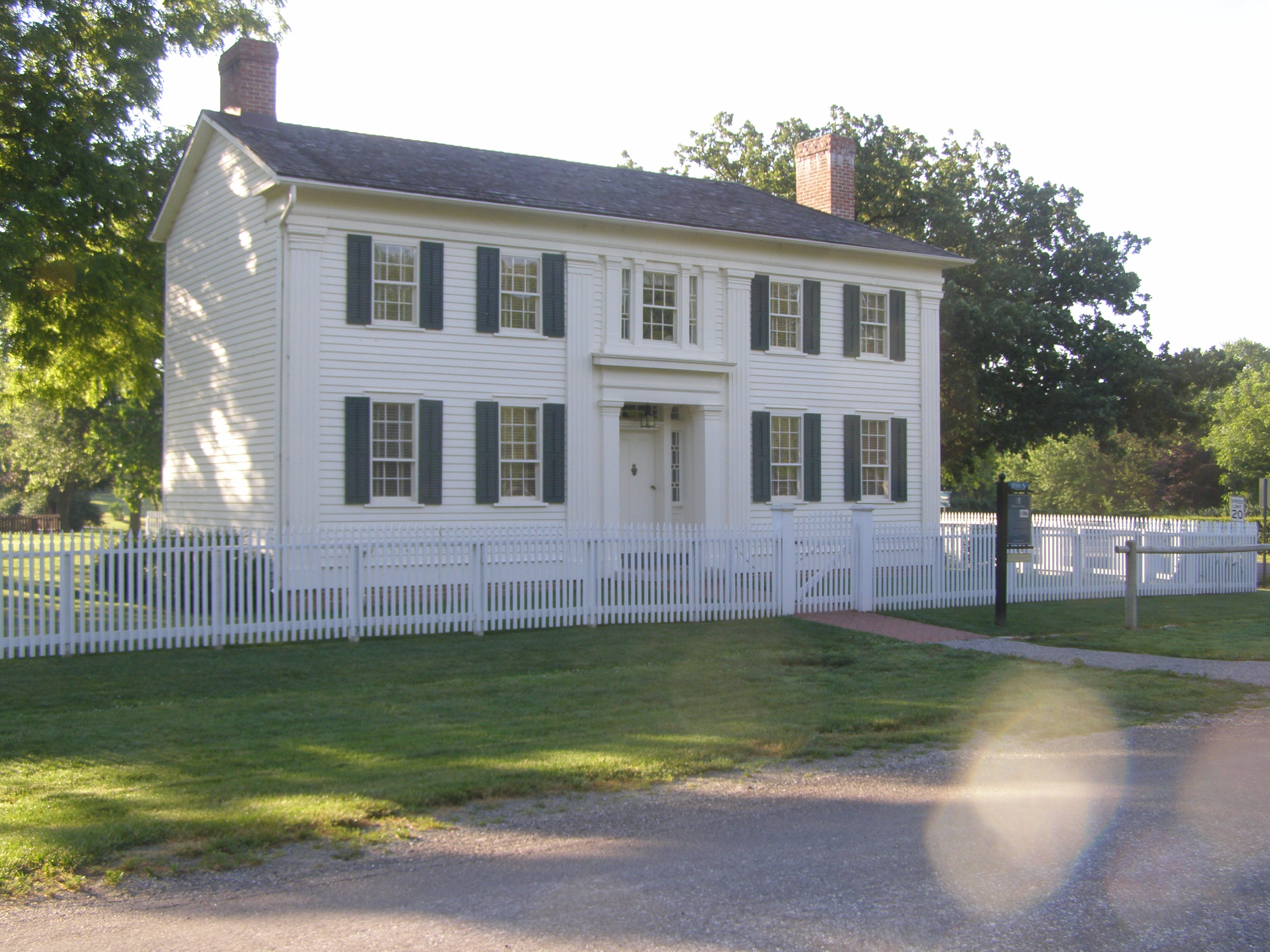
Mansion House in 2012

The Joseph Smith Mansion House in Nauvoo, Illinois, is a large residence first occupied by Joseph Smith, the founder of the Latter Day Saint movement. Smith used the house as a personal home, a public boarding house, a hotel, and as a site for the performance of temple ordinances.

In January 1841, Smith declared in a revelation that Latter Day Saint Robert D. Foster should fulfill the contract he had entered into to build a house for Smith to live in. The house was constructed by Foster, and the Smith family moved into the Mansion House on August 31, 1843. The house was a two-storey building built of white pine in the Greek Revival style.

Initially, Smith used the house to entertain guests in Nauvoo, giving visitors free room and board. However, because he was unable to cover the expenses that this free lodging entailed, Smith began charging guests in September 1843 and running the Mansion House as a hotel. A sign posted on the front of his house on September 15, 1843 read:

In consequence of my house being constantly crowded with strangers and other persons wishing to see me, or who had business in the city, I found myself unable to support so much company free of charge, which I have done from the foundation of the Church. My house has been a home and restingplace for thousands, and my family many times obliged to do without food, after having fed all they had to visitors; and I could have continued the same liberal course, had it not been for the cruel and untiring persecution of my relentless enemies. I have been reduced to the necessity of opening "The Mansion" as a hotel. I have provided the best table accommodations in the city; and the Mansion, being large and convenient, renders travelers more comfortable than any other place on the Upper Mississippi. I have erected a large and commodious brick stable, and it is capable of accommodating seventy-five horses at one time, storing the requisite amount of forage, and is unsurpassed by any similar establishment in the State.

At one point Smith had installed a bar, but quickly reversed his action at the request of his wife, Emma. In January 1844, Smith leased the hotel to Ebenezer Robinson, who continued to operate it.

The mummies and papyri from which the Book of Abraham is claimed to be derived were also displayed to visitors in the mansion house for 25 cents.

Prior to the completion of the Nauvoo Temple, Smith performed some temple ordinances in the Mansion House.

After Smith and his brother Hyrum were killed in Carthage Jail in June 1844, their bodies were displayed in the Mansion House, where approximately ten thousand people viewed the bodies on June 29. George Q. Cannon constructed the Smiths' death masks in the house.

Emma Smith and her children continued to live in the Mansion House. After Emma Smith married Lewis C. Bidamon in 1847, they lived in the house until 1869, when they moved to the Nauvoo House. In the 1890s, the hotel wing of the home was removed.

In 1918, Frederick A. Smith, Joseph Smith's grandson, deeded the Mansion House to the Reorganized Church of Jesus Christ of Latter Day Saints (RLDS Church). The Mansion House was owned by the RLDS Church (now known as the Community of Christ) until 2024, and was operated as a historical site and a tourist museum. The Mansion House is part of the Nauvoo Historic District, a National Historic Landmark. On March 5, 2024, it was announced that The Church of Jesus Christ of Latter-day Saints purchased the Mansion House as well other historic properties and artifacts from Community of Christ.
