= Edward T. Grigware =

American painter

- Born: April 3, 1889; Paceville, Michigan, U.S.
- Died: January 10, 1960 (aged 70); Cody, Wyoming, U.S.
- Resting place: Riverside Cemetery
- Education: Chicago Academy of Fine Arts
- Occupation: Painter
- Spouse: Blanche Lanaghen

Edward T. Grigware (April 3, 1889 - January 10, 1960) was an American painter. He painted murals for the Church of Jesus Christ of Latter-day Saints (LDS Church) as well as for banks.

== Life ==
Grigware was born on April 3, 1889, in Paceville, Michigan.

Grigware first lived in Chicago, where he joined the Chicago Association of Painters and Sculptors, and his artwork was exhibited at the Art Institute of Chicago in 1927. In 1936, he moved to Cody, Wyoming, where he painted the mural inside the Cody Mural Chapel of the Church of Jesus Christ of Latter-day Saints in the 1940s. He also painted murals in LDS chapels in Los Angeles and Honolulu, as well as banks in Spokane and Seattle. His artwork was added to the collection of the Northwest Museum of Arts and Culture in Spokane, Washington.

Grigware married Blanche Lanaghen in 1913, and he was widowed in 1959. He died of a heart attack on January 10, 1960, in Cody, Wyoming. His funeral was held at St Anthony Catholic Church, and he was buried in Riverside Cemetery.
