= John Murdock (missionary) =

American LDS Church missionary (1792–1871)

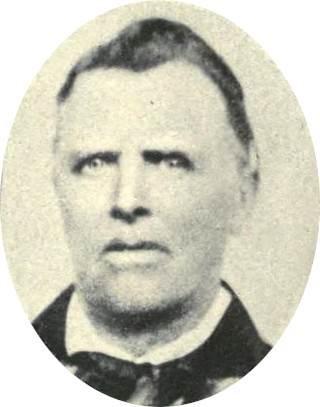
- John Murdock, c. 1850

Personal details
- Born: John Murdock Jr. July 15, 1792; Kortright, New York, United States
- Died: December 23, 1871 (aged 79); Beaver, Utah Territory, United States
- Resting place: Mountain View Cemetery, Beaver, Utah
- Baptism Date: 5 November 1830
- Known For: Early Mormon missionary

John Murdock Jr. (July 15, 1792 – December 23, 1871) was an early convert to the Latter Day Saint movement and was a missionary for the Church of Jesus Christ of Latter-day Saints (LDS Church). Mentioned twice in the Doctrine and Covenants, he devoted most of his life to full-time missionary service for the LDS Church. He was the first mission president for the LDS Church in Australia where he oversaw the official organization of the church in the country and its early growth. A compatriot of Joseph Smith, Murdock attended School of the Prophets and participated in Zion's Camp. After the death of his first wife in childbirth, Joseph and Emma Smith adopted his infant twins. Julia Murdock Smith, who survived to adulthood, was the eldest child and only daughter of the Smiths.

== Biography ==
=== Early life and religious conversion ===
John Murdock was born on July 15, 1792, in Kortright, New York, to John Murdock and Eleanor Riggs. His mother died when he was four years old. His father remarried, but Murdock and his brothers experienced substandard treatment compared to their step-siblings and therefore disliked their step-mother. After living at various relatives' and neighbors' homes for many years, Murdock married Julia Clapp in 1823 at the age of thirty-one and settled in Orange, Ohio.

Murdock's parents, and some of his mother's relatives, were members of the "Seceder Church". Prior to joining the Church of Christ, Murdock had belonged to many churches. First, he affiliated with the Dutch Lutheran Church. He next became a Methodist. He was also briefly part of a Baptist congregation, which he left because he did not agree with their support of Calvinist doctrines. In 1827, Murdock joined the Campbellites. His falling out with the Campbellites was largely due to Alexander Campbell rejecting the "gift and power of the Holy Ghost." Murdock was baptized a member of the Latter Day Saint Church of Christ by Parley P. Pratt on November 5, 1830, in Geauga County, Ohio. Murdock was one of the first converts to the church and one of the first full-time missionaries. Within a week of his baptism, Murdock was ordained an elder by Oliver Cowdery. Murdock began proselyting in Orange, baptizing seventy of his neighbors in four months.

=== Church service ===
On April 30, 1831, Julia Clapp died giving birth to twins. Nine days later, Joseph Smith and his wife Emma took the infants, Joseph and Julia, to raise as their own. While Murdock could have left his infants in the care of his in-laws, he chose not to due to their recent estrangement over differing religious beliefs. He did not immediately remarry, fearing his second wife would become like his own stepmother, who tyrannized him as a child.

After the death of his wife, John Murdock sold his property to become a full-time missionary. Murdock depended on the charity of hosts and people he visited to survive, leaving his children with neighbors and family members whom he paid in exchange for their care. From April 1831 until he went with Zion's Camp in April 1834, Murdock spent almost all his time as a traveling missionary for the church.

First, Murdock accompanied Hyrum Smith, Lyman Wight, and John Corrill on a mission to Independence, Missouri— by way of Pontiac, Michigan. This particular mission was given by a revelation from Joseph Smith on 6 June 1831. It was canonized in Doctrine and Covenants 52:8. Murdock had become ill in the early part of August, delaying the missionary party on the way to Missouri, resulting in a chance encounter with Joseph Smith on his way from Independence.

In 1833, Murdock attended the School of the Prophets. During winter 1832 to 1833, he lived with Joseph Smith and his family, where he had daily contact with his daughter. Murdock served several missions for the church in the early years.

Joseph Smith called Murdock on a mission to the Eastern states in Doctrine and Covenants 99:1.

In April 1834, Murdock joined Zion's Camp. On March 17, 1834, he was at a conference at Avon, New York, attempting to convince the local members of the church to join the Zion's Camp effort. After Zion's Camp, Murdock also served on the high councils in Missouri. He also served as a bishop in Nauvoo. In 1846, Murdock traveled to the Salt Lake Valley with the Abraham O. Smoot company accompanied by his fourth wife Sarah and her son, George; seven-year-old Gideon, Murdock's surviving son with his third wife Electa; and a two-year-old foster child named Mary. They arrived in the Salt Lake Valley in September 1847.

==== Missionary in Australia ====
In 1851, Murdock went to Australia as the first Latter-day Saint missionary sent to Australia since William Barratt in 1840 and became Australia's first mission president. Murdock and Charles W. Wandell established the mission in Sydney on 31 October 1851. They printed 2,000 copies of Proclamation to the People of the Coasts and Islands of the Pacific, which they successfully sold. They exerted their time and resources to proselyte using pamphlets and printed many others. It was calculated that Wandell and Murdock had distributed 24,000 tracts. Their initial proselyting strategy was preaching in public meetings, but they soon acquired a meeting hall. The earliest converts at the official opening of the mission were in December 1851. They included Emily and Joseph Popplewells, Bridget Gallimore, and nine others. The Sydney Branch, a small organised congregation of Latter-day Saints, was organised on 4 January 1852 with twelve members. By March, there were 36 members. Murdock and Wandell directed three church meetings each Sunday as well as five public proselyting meetings per week. After Murdock returned to the United States in June 1852, Wandell replaced him as mission president.

=== Later life ===
Murdock was ordained as a patriarch in Lehi, Utah, and fulfilled his duties until March 1867 when his illness, which is postulated by historians to be Parkinson's disease, prevented it. Murdock avoided participating in the LDS practice of plural marriage for over thirty years. In January 1857, he succumbed to ecclesiastical pressure and married widow Majory McEwan as a plural wife. After they were married in Salt Lake City, McEwan returned home to her children rather than sleeping in the house with her new husband. She continued to sleep at her own home, only traveling to the Murdock household to help her sister wife with the housework. Although the Murdocks invited her and her children to stay with them, she continually refused. Tensions rose between the two wives. By the summer of 1857, McEwan stopped visiting the Murdock home. On December 6, 1857, David Evans, Murdock's local ecclesiastical leader, had a disciplinary meeting with Murdock and McEwan and charged Murdock with "failure to consummate the marriage". Murdock responded that this was due to his advanced age and illness. Eventually, McEwan and Murdock were granted a divorce on January 27, 1857.

In April 1858, bishop David Evans and Murdock had a disagreement which led Murdock to solicit help from the president of the LDS Church, Brigham Young. During a sermon, Evans encouraged the congregation to lie about practicing polygamy to protect themselves from the United States government which Murdock publicly disagreed with. This embarrassed Evans who, in retaliation, removed Murdock's name from the list of high priests in the congregation. Murdock refused to attend church for several months. Murdock brought the issue to the attention of Brigham Young who commanded that Murdock's name be restored on the records of the high priests.

In 1867, Murdock and his wife Sarah separated. She remained in Lehi with her son George. In October, Murdock traveled to Beaver, Utah, to be with his sons, Orric and John Riggs, who would care for him in his illness. In his last years, Murdock wrote his daughter Julia, urging her to come visit him, but the visit never occurred. He died on December 23, 1871, in Beaver.

== Family ==
John Murdock married Julia Clapp on December 14, 1823. With Clapp, Murdock had five children. Their first son, Orrice, was born in 1824, and John Riggs and Phebe followed in 1825 and 1828, respectively. However, Clapp died after delivering twins on April 30, 1831. The twins, Joseph and Julia, were adopted by Joseph and Emma Smith; however, only Julia survived to adulthood. Murdock's son Joseph died before he reached one year old and Phebe died of cholera at age six. Murdock married his second wife, Amoranda Turner, on February 4, 1836; however, Turner died in 1837. He married his third wife, Electa Allen, on May 3, 1838. She died in 1845. While Murdock had three children with Allen, only one of them survived their time in Nauvoo, Illinois. Murdock married his fourth wife, Sarah Zufelt, on March 13, 1846.
