= Historic Cody Mural Chapel =

Mormon chapel in Wyoming USA

Historic Cody Chapel of the Church of Jesus Christ of Latter-day Saints
- Interactive map of the Historic Cody Chapel of the Church of Jesus Christ of Latter-day Saints area

General information
- Type: Chapel and museum
- Location: Cody, Wyoming, 1719 Wyoming Avenue, United States
- Coordinates: 44.5305°N 109.0540°W
- Client: The Church of Jesus Christ of Latter-day Saints

The Historic Cody Mural Chapel is a chapel and museum of the Church of Jesus Christ of Latter-day Saints in Cody, Wyoming. The chapel was dedicated in 1949 by Henry D. Moyle and was rededicated in 1972 by Hugh B. Brown.

== History ==
The idea for the chapel and mural came from Lloyd Taggart and Glenn E. Nielson who were in the local church leadership. Edward Grigware, a local resident, was asked to paint the mural and accepted because he had not painted a religious subject before. Grigware spent a year researching the church before drawing a preliminary sketch. The center opened as an official visitors center in May 1982 with an exhibit explaining how members of the church negotiated water rights with Buffalo Bill.

== The Mural ==
The mural was painted on the rotunda of the chapel's foyer by Edward T. Grigware and unveiled in 1951. The mural depicts scenes from church history and includes representations of the first eight presidents of the Church of Jesus Christ of Latter-day Saints. As you leave the room a group of faces representing the Mormon pioneers is depicted above the words, "Lest We Forget."

=== Construction and painting ===
The rotunda was constructed by mounting circular boards at 16-inch (410 mm) intervals until they reached the center of the ceiling. The top board is suspended to from beams in the roof. The canvas was then hung on the plaster and painted from miniatures. The canvas and paints were imported from outside the United States.

=== Lithographic reproduction of the mural ===
Fred Bond from Los Angeles reproduced the mural for The Cody Mural: A Pictorial History of Mormonism. Several overlapping photos were taken from a platform and turned into negatives. The negatives were then made into transparencies that were custom colored and turned into lithographic plates to a scale of one inch (25 mm) in to two feet (610 mm).
