= Nauvoo House =

Boarding house and Mormon historic site in Nauvoo, Illinois

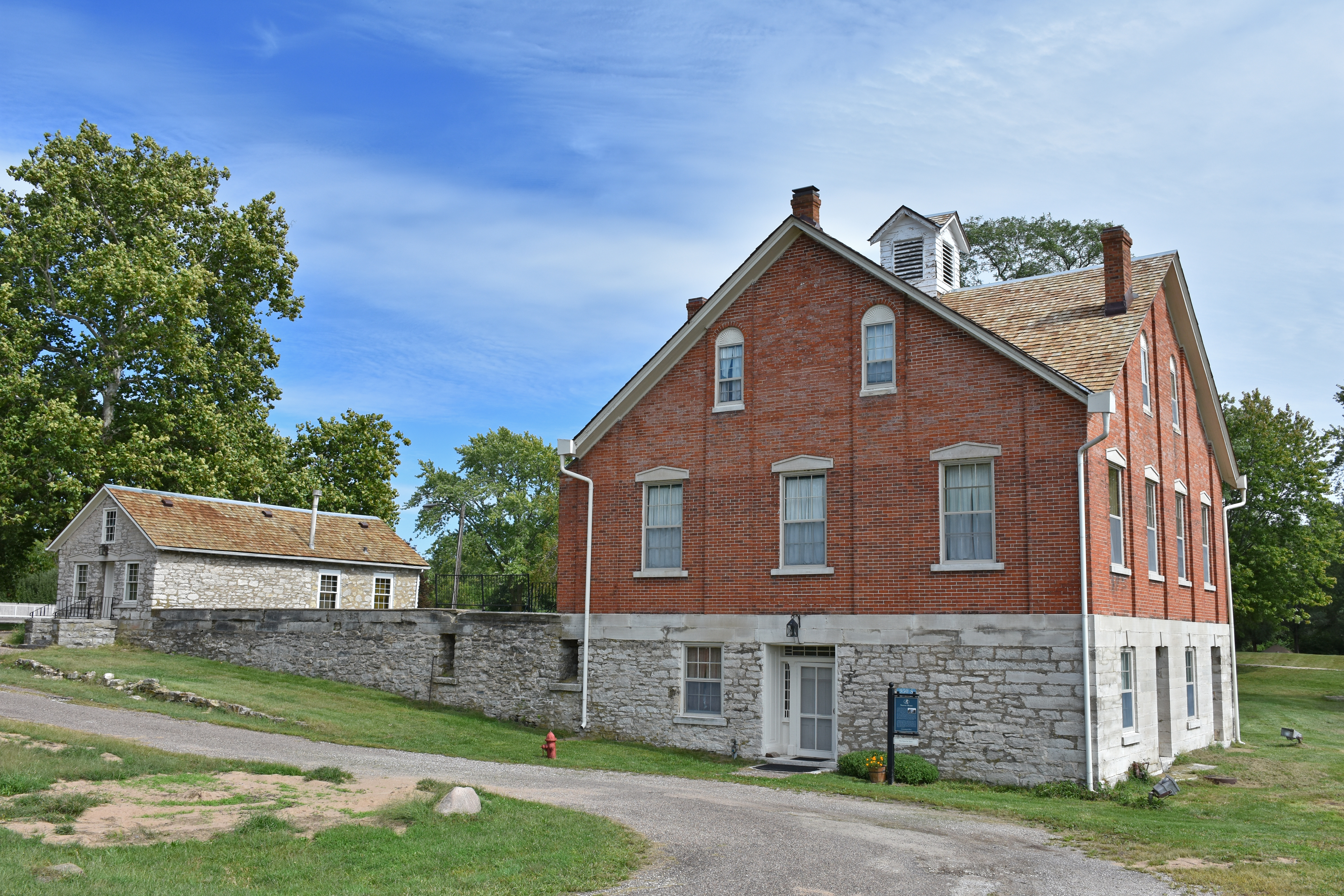
- The Nauvoo House (at right) and neighboring Bidaman Stable
- Interactive map of the Nauvoo House area

General information
- Location: 950 South Main Street, Nauvoo IL 62354
- Coordinates: 40.5401°N 91.3914°W
- Construction started: 1841
- Construction stopped: 1844

The Nauvoo House in Nauvoo, Illinois, is a building that Joseph Smith, the founder of the Latter Day Saint movement, and his followers began constructing as a boarding house in the 1840s. The boarding house was never completed, but the structure was later converted into a residential home and renamed the Riverside Mansion. The Nauvoo House, as it is referred to today, is part of the Nauvoo Historic District, a National Historic Landmark.

== Initial construction ==
In January 1841, Joseph Smith received a revelation with instructions to construct a house in Nauvoo which would be "a resting-place for the weary traveler." The revelation also instructed that the building should be called the Nauvoo House, and set out detailed instructions about how the building of the house would be financed. George Miller, Lyman Wight, John Snider, and Peter Haws were appointed as the overseers of the project, and they created the Nauvoo House Association on February 23, 1841.

Construction of the Nauvoo House began later in 1841, with Smith placing the original manuscript of the Book of Mormon in the cornerstone of the building. Construction continued until 1844, when resources were pulled away from the Nauvoo House to concentrate on completion of the Nauvoo Temple.

After Smith and his brother Hyrum were killed by a mob in June 1844, their bodies were secretly buried in the cellar of the unfinished building to prevent them from being stolen. They were later removed and buried close to the Homestead, and even later still, relocated to the nearby Smith Family Cemetery.

== Conversion to Riverside Mansion ==
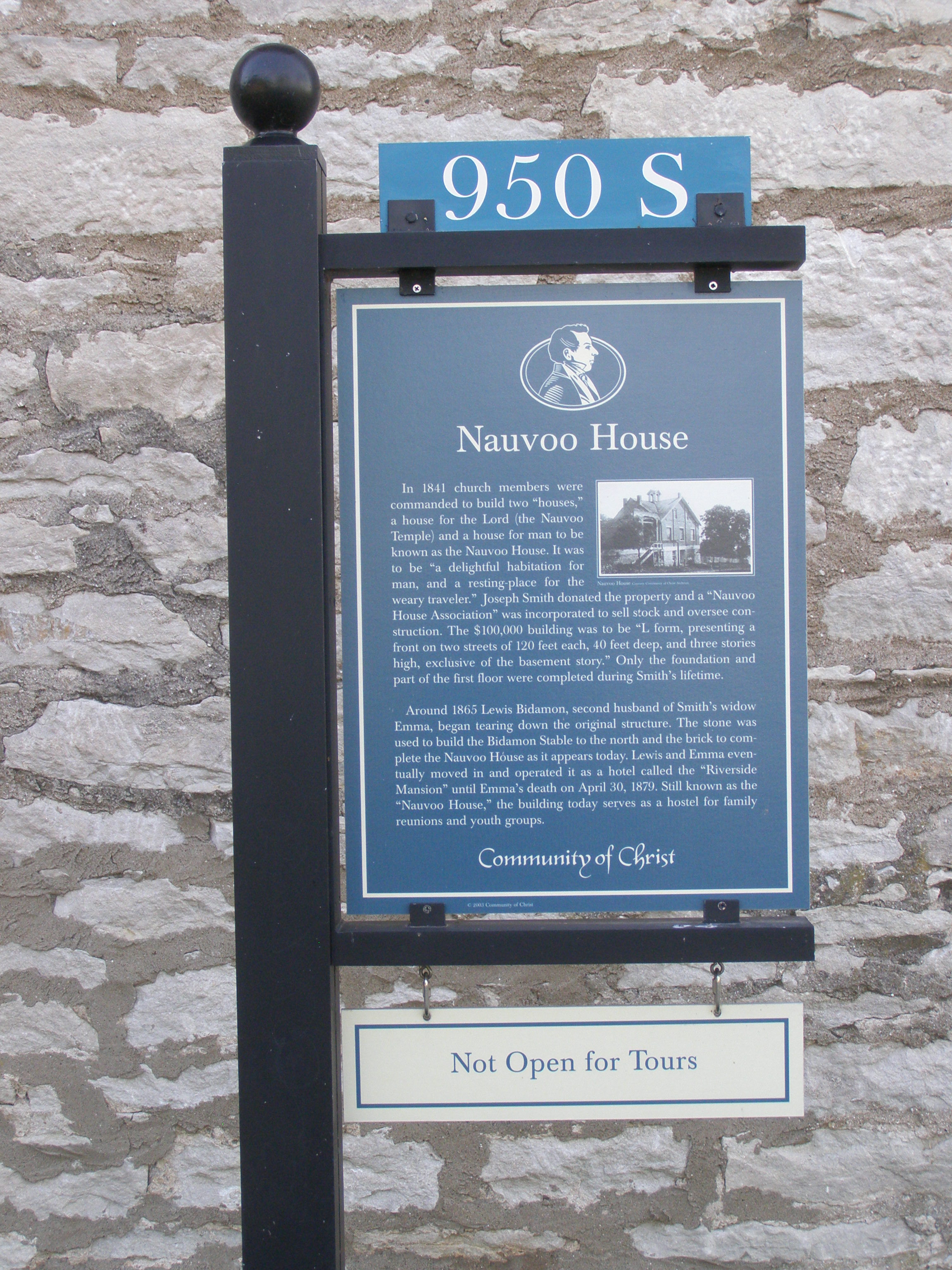
Historic plaque for the Nauvoo House, Nauvoo, Illinois (Joseph Smith Historic Site)

After Smith's death, his widow Emma Smith retained title to the Nauvoo House. When the majority of Latter Day Saints left Nauvoo in the late 1840s, the structure was still only partially completed. In the 1870s, Emma and her husband Lewis C. Bidamon converted the unfinished boarding house into a smaller structure called the Riverside Mansion (also called Bidamon House). Bidamon razed portions of the original structure for materials, some of which was used to construct the nearby Bidamon Stable.

During the renovations, Lewis Bidamon removed the original Book of Mormon manuscript from the cornerstone. Water, which had seeped into the stone, had badly damaged the manuscript, and fragmented pieces were given away to visitors by the Bidamons. Emma and Lewis Bidamon both lived in Riverside Mansion from 1871 until their deaths.

== Ownership ==
In 1909, the Reorganized Church of Jesus Christ of Latter Day Saints (RLDS Church), now called the Community of Christ, purchased the property. The building was used by the church as a dormitory available for group rental, as well as a stop on their guided walking tour of the Joseph Smith Historic Site, until March 2024.

On March 5, 2024, it was announced that the Nauvoo House, as well as other historically significant properties and artifacts, including the Kirtland Temple, had been sold by the Community of Christ to the Church of Jesus Christ of Latter-day Saints.
