= Lewis C. Bidamon =

Illinois militia leader and second husband of Emma H. Smith (1806–1891)

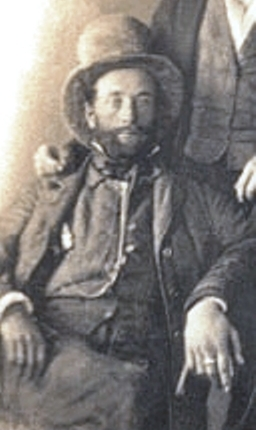
- Born: Lewis Crum Bidamon; January 16, 1806; Smithfield, Virginia
- Died: February 11, 1891 (aged 85); Nauvoo House, Nauvoo, Illinois
- Resting place: Smith Family Cemetery, Nauvoo, Illinois, United States; 40°32′25.98″N 91°23′31.06″W
- Spouses: Nancy Sebree (after 1827) Mary Ann Douglas (m. 1842–1842) Emma Smith (m. 1847; died 1879) Nancy Abercrombie (m. 1880)
- Children: 5–6

Lewis Crum Bidamon (January 16, 1806 – February 11, 1891) was a leader in the Illinois militia that assisted Latter Day Saints in the 1846 "Battle of Nauvoo". In 1847, Bidamon married Emma Smith, the widow of Joseph Smith, the founder of the Latter Day Saint movement; from this time, Bidamon was the stepfather of Joseph Smith III and the other surviving children of Joseph and Emma Smith.

== Personal life ==
Bidamon was born in Smithfield, Virginia. When he was fourteen years old, his family moved to Highland County, Ohio. He later relocated to Canton, Illinois. In 1846, just as the Latter Day Saints were beginning to depart Nauvoo, Illinois, Bidamon moved to Nauvoo. He was a lieutenant colonel of the 32nd Regiment of the Illinois militia, and he helped control the violence being perpetuated against the Latter Day Saints. Because of his position in the Illinois militia, he was often referred to as "Major" Bidamon.

Bidamon married Nancy Sebree in 1827, with whom he had four children. During this first marriage, he also fathered a child with another woman. After Nancy Bidamon died, Lewis Bidamon married Mary Ann Douglas in 1842, but the marriage only lasted six months. He moved to Nauvoo after he was divorced from his second wife.

Unlike the majority of Latter Day Saints, Emma Smith did not follow Brigham Young's suggestion that the Latter Day Saints leave Nauvoo and settle in the Salt Lake Valley in present-day Utah. Her husband Joseph Smith had been killed in 1844, and after his death Emma Smith decided to remain in Nauvoo. On 23 December 1847, which would have been Joseph's 42nd birthday, Bidamon and Smith were married in Nauvoo by a Methodist circuit rider. At the time of the marriage, Bidamon was the father of two daughters (his two sons had died) and Emma was the mother of five surviving children. Bidamon was not a Latter Day Saint; he believed that Joseph Smith was an honest man but that Smith had somehow been deceived into believing he was a prophet. Bidamon had been raised as a Lutheran, and he had helped establish a Congregational church in Canton, Illinois, but in general he did not consider himself to be religious.

Bidamon traveled to California during the gold rush and during the American Civil War he was a major and colonel in the Illinois militia. He lived in Nauvoo until his death, and on numerous occasions was elected a justice of the peace and a police magistrate for the city. He was also a businessman and ran a number of ventures in Illinois and on the Mississippi River. The Bidamons lived in the Mansion House, which Joseph Smith had begun constructing prior to his death in 1844. In 1871, they moved to the Nauvoo House, which Bidamon converted into a smaller structure they called Riverside Mansion. Emma and Lewis Bidamon both lived in the Nauvoo House until their deaths.

In 1864, during his seventeenth year of marriage to Emma, Bidamon fathered the child of Nancy Abercrombie, a widow who had recently moved to Nauvoo. After Emma died in 1879, Lewis Bidamon married Abercrombie. He was married to her until his death. Bidamon was buried at the Smith Family Cemetery in Nauvoo.

Bidamon's papers are held by the Huntington Library in San Marino, California.
