= Smith Family Cemetery =

Burial place of Joseph Smith and family

Coordinates: 40.54055°N 91.3923°W

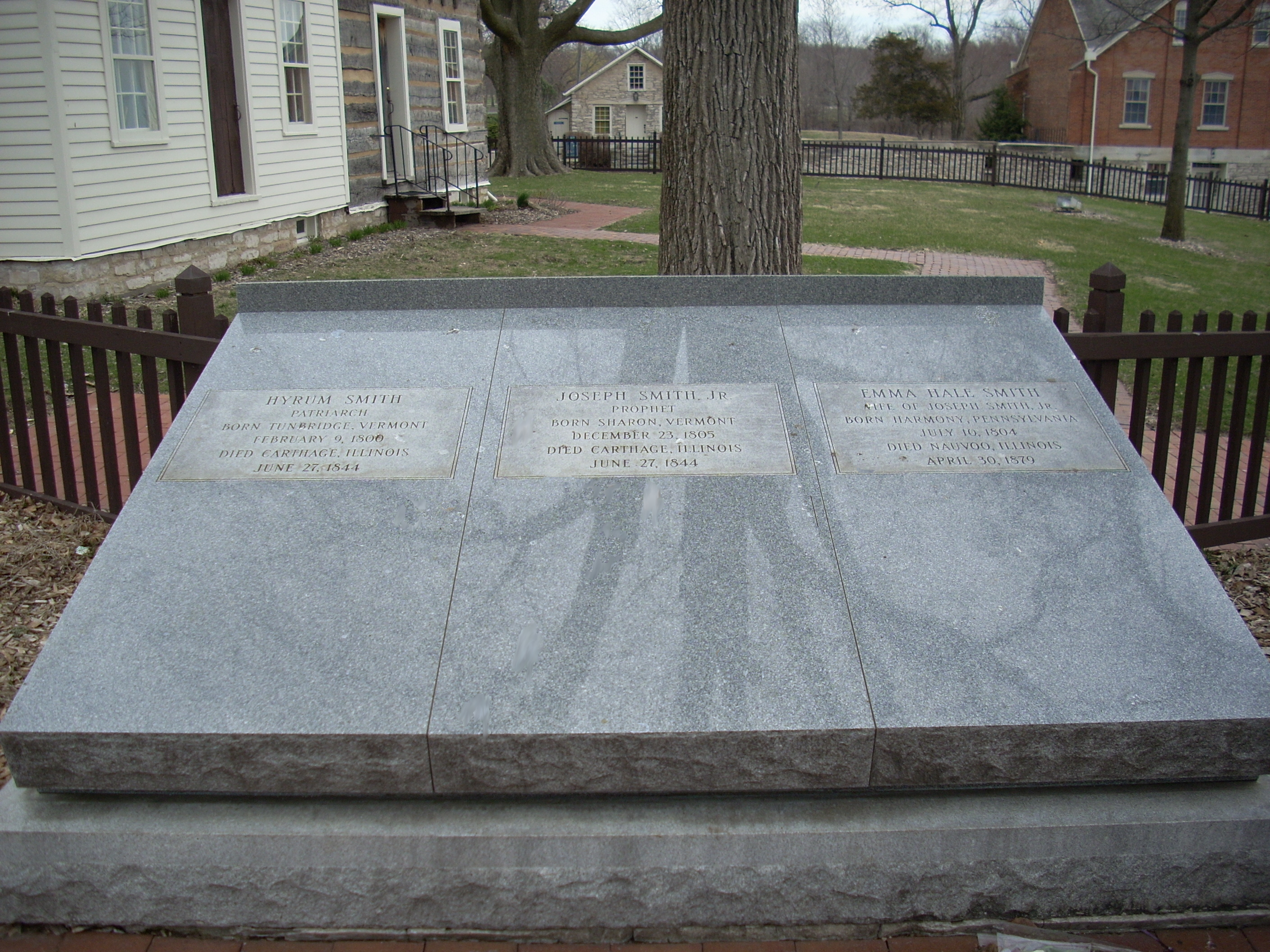
Gravestone for Joseph, Emma, and Hyrum Smith.

The Smith Family Cemetery, in Nauvoo, Illinois, is the burial place of Joseph Smith, his wife Emma, and brother Hyrum. Joseph Smith's parents Joseph Smith Sr. and Lucy Mack Smith are also buried there, as are Joseph Smith's brothers Samuel and Don Carlos. Others buried there include Robert B. Thompson and Emma Smith's second husband Lewis C. Bidamon.

== Overview ==
Overlooking the Mississippi River, the cemetery is located on Water Street, and is open 24 hours a day to visitors. The site is owned and maintained by the Community of Christ. The Joseph Smith Sr. and Lucy Mack Smith Family foundation funds the maintenance of the cemetery. Community of Christ stated on 15 March 2024 they are exploring "gifting the cemetery to the Smith Family Foundation."

== Renovation ==
In 1991, the cemetery was renovated and dedicated by two members of the Smith family: M. Russell Ballard, an apostle of the Church of Jesus Christ of Latter-day Saints, and Wallace B. Smith, prophet-president of the Reorganized Church of Jesus Christ of Latter Day Saints. Ballard was a descendant of Hyrum Smith, while Wallace B. Smith was a great-grandson of Joseph Smith.

== See also ==
- Death of Joseph Smith § Interment
