= Emma Smith =

Wife of Joseph Smith Jr. and Latter Day Saint leader (1804–1879)

Emma Hale Smith Bidamon
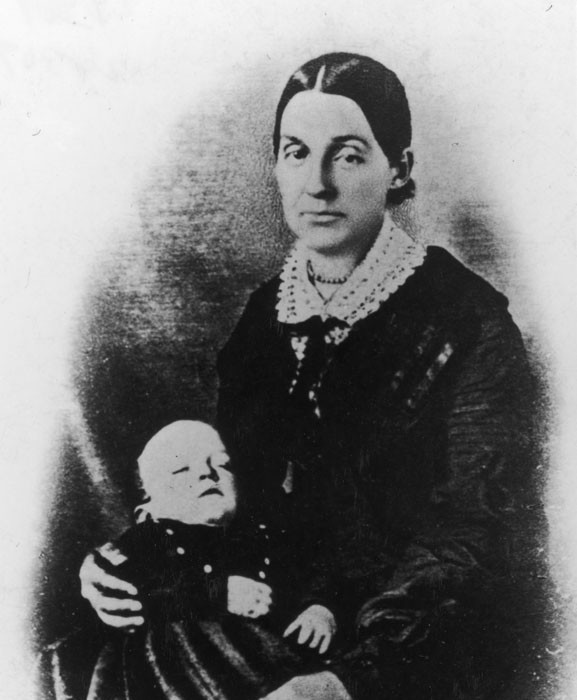
- Emma Hale Smith circa 1845 with David Hyrum Smith

1st President of the Female Relief Society of Nauvoo
- March 17, 1842 – 1844
- Called by: Joseph Smith
- Successor: Eliza R. Snow

Personal details
- Born: Emma Hale; July 10, 1804; Harmony Township, Pennsylvania, U.S.
- Died: April 30, 1879 (aged 74); Nauvoo House, Nauvoo, Illinois, U.S.
- Resting place: Smith Family Cemetery, Nauvoo; 40.5406°N 91.3920°W
- Notable works: A Collection of Sacred Hymns; Latter Day Saints' Selection of Hymns
- Spouse(s): Joseph Smith (m. 1827; died 1844) Lewis C. Bidamon (m. 1847)
- Children: 11 (see Children of Joseph Smith)
- Signature

Emma Hale Smith Bidamon (July 10, 1804 – April 30, 1879) was a leader in the early Latter Day Saint movement and a prominent member of the Reorganized Church of Jesus Christ of Latter Day Saints (RLDS Church) as well as the first wife of Joseph Smith, the movement's founder. In 1842, when the Ladies' Relief Society of Nauvoo was formed as a women's service organization, she was elected by its members as the organization's first president.

After the killing of Joseph Smith, Emma remained in Nauvoo rather than following Brigham Young and the Mormon pioneers to the Utah Territory. Emma was supportive of Smith's teachings throughout her life with the exception of plural marriage and remained loyal to her son, Joseph Smith III, in his leadership of the RLDS Church.

== Early life and first marriage, 1804–1829 ==
=== Early life ===
Emma Hale was born on July 10, 1804, in Harmony Township, Susquehanna County, Pennsylvania, in her family's log cabin. She was the seventh child and third daughter of Isaac Hale and Elizabeth Lewis Hale. She was descended of primarily English ancestors, including seven passengers on the Mayflower. Isaac and Elizabeth arrived in Susquehanna County in 1791 where they bought land and became the first permanent settlers.

Isaac and Elizabeth were members of the first Methodist Episcopal congregation in Harmony, where Emma's uncle preached. Beginning at age seven or eight, Emma was involved in the church, reading the Bible and singing hymns. Emma's father stepped away from the church for a time and became a deist, but later returned to the church after Emma's requests.

The Hale family was relatively wealthy. Isaac hunted and Elizabeth hosted lodgers and boarders in their home. The Hale family was known for being honest, hard-working, and generous to their neighbors.

Throughout her childhood, Emma was interested in religion, canoeing, and riding horses. Emma learned how to read and write and was considered to be intelligent. She attended a girls school for a year and taught school in Harmony when she returned.

=== Courtship and marriage to Joseph ===
Emma first met her future husband, Joseph Smith Jr., in 1825. Joseph lived near Palmyra, New York, but boarded with the Hales in Harmony while he was employed in a company of men hired by Josiah Stowell and one of Emma's relatives to dig for money on the Hale family property. Rumors about Joseph having a unique ability to find hidden treasure caused Stowell to offer him a high wage. Although the company was unsuccessful in finding the suspected mine and Emma's father eventually turned against the project, Joseph and Emma secretly met without her family's approval several times at a friend's house during the dig and after while Joseph was working as farmhand nearby. When Emma and Joseph spoke to the Hales to receive a blessing on their marriage, Isaac and Elizabeth Hale refused; possibly because Isaac wanted Emma to marry a neighbor and he considered Joseph to be a "stranger" and possibly because of Joseph's failed money-digging operation on the Hales' land. On January 17, 1827, Joseph and Emma left the Stowell house and traveled to the house of Zachariah Tarbill in South Bainbridge, New York, where they were married the following day. (Note: The marriage site is now the Afton Fairgrounds, located on New York State Route 41 on the east side of the Susquehanna River; and a New York State Historical Marker commemorates the location.)

On September 22, 1827, Joseph and Emma took a horse and carriage belonging to Joseph Knight, Sr., and went to a hill, now known as Hill Cumorah, where Joseph said he received a set of golden plates. The announcement of Joseph having the plates created a great deal of excitement in the area. In December 1827, with financial support from Martin Harris, the couple accepted an invitation from Emma's parents to move to Harmony.

The Hales helped Emma and Joseph obtain a house and a small farm. Once they settled in, Joseph began work on the Book of Mormon, with Emma acting as a scribe. Emma never witnessed the golden plates, as Joseph only handled the object while concealed. Emma would allege only that she felt an object through a cloth, traced pages through the cloth with her fingers, heard a metallic sound as she moved it, and felt a heavy weight. She later wrote in an interview with her son, Joseph Smith III: "In writing for your father I frequently wrote day after day, often sitting at the table close by him, he sitting with his face buried in his hat, with the stone in it, and dictating hour after hour with nothing between us." In Harmony on June 15, 1828, Emma gave birth to her first child – a son named Alvin – who lived only a few hours. He was buried east of their house. For the next two weeks, Emma remained gravely ill.

Due to increased hostility towards Joseph as he worked on the Book of Mormon, Emma and Joseph went to live with David Whitmer in Fayette, New York, to finish the Book of Mormon. While there, both Emma and a schoolteacher named Oliver Cowdery worked as Joseph's scribes. Joseph received a copyright for the Book of Mormon in June 1829 and the book was published in March 1830.

== "Elect lady" and the early church, 1830–1839 ==
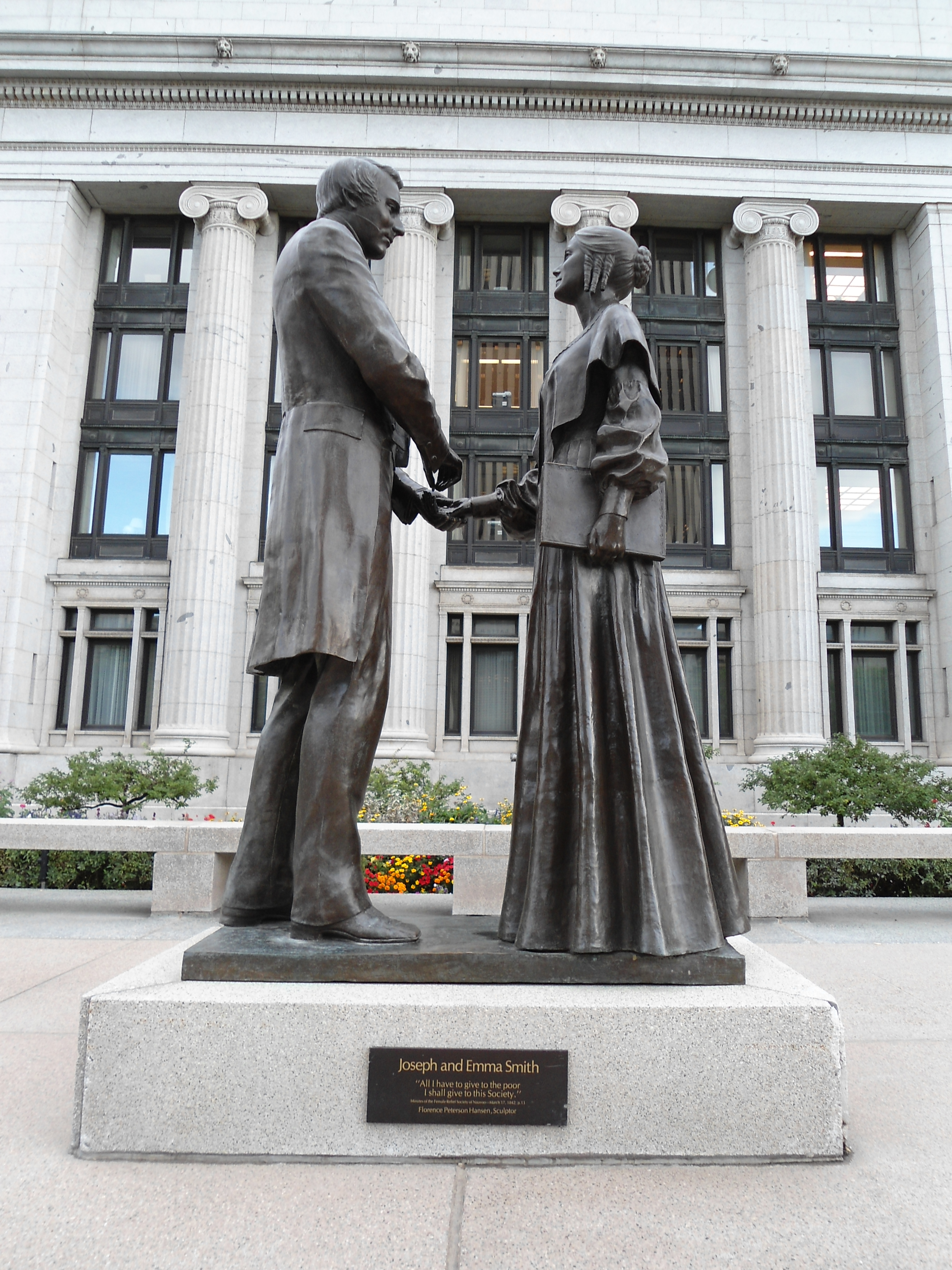
Statue of Joseph and Emma Smith in Salt Lake City

On April 6, 1830, Joseph and five other men established the Church of Christ. Emma was baptized by Oliver Cowdery on June 28, 1830, in Colesville, New York, surrounded by a group of mocking people. Later that evening before the confirmation service, Joseph was arrested for being a disorderly person and causing an uproar by preaching the Book of Mormon. A few days later, Joseph was acquitted of all charges. Emma was confirmed later by Joseph and Newel Knight.

In July 1830, Joseph received a revelation, now known as Doctrine and Covenants Section 25, that highlighted Emma Smith as "an elect lady". The revelation says that Emma would "be ordained under [Joseph's] hand to expound scriptures, and to exhort the church." The revelation instructed Emma to "murmur not" and described Emma's duties to Joseph. Emma was also directed to be Joseph's scribe and to create a hymnbook for the new church.

Joseph and Emma returned to Harmony for a time, but relations with Emma's parents remained strained. Emma's father was displeased that Joseph and Emma were living off charity and Joseph was late to return money he borrowed to purchase a farm. Many people in Harmony also openly opposed Joseph. Emma and Joseph returned to live at David Whitmer's farm in August 1830. This marked the last time that Emma saw her parents. Despite the rift that her marriage to Joseph created in the family, Emma did reunite with her family. She communicated with her mother through letters. Some members of her family moved to Nauvoo although they did not accept Emma's invitation to join Mormonism.

Emma and Joseph went back to staying in the homes of members of the growing church. The couple lived first with the Whitmers in Fayette, then with Newel K. Whitney and his family in Kirtland, Ohio, and then in a cabin on a farm owned by Isaac Morley. It was here on April 30, 1831, that Emma gave birth to premature twins, Thaddeus and Louisa; both babies died hours later. That same day, Julia Clapp Murdock died giving birth to twins, Joseph and Julia. When the twins were nine days old, their father, John, gave the infants to the Smiths to raise as their own. On September 2, 1831, the Smiths moved into John Johnson's home in Hiram, Ohio. The infant Joseph died of exposure or pneumonia in late March 1832, after a door was left open during a mob attack on Smith.

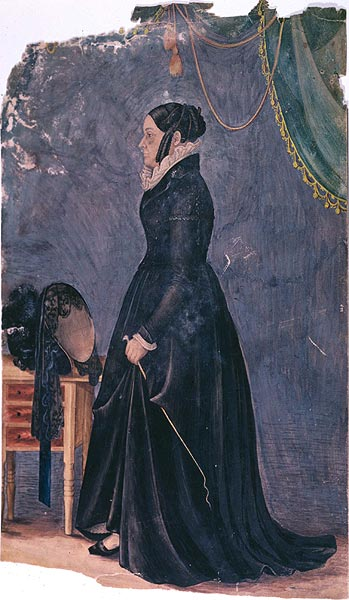
Emma Smith in riding habit in Nauvoo. Emma and other women of Nauvoo would sometimes accompany the Nauvoo Legion on horseback.

On November 6, 1832, Emma gave birth to Joseph Smith III in the upper room of Whitney's store in Kirtland. Young Joseph (as he became known) was the first of her natural children to live to adulthood. A second son, Frederick Granger Williams Smith (named after Frederick G. Williams, a counselor in the church's First Presidency), followed on June 29, 1836. As the Kirtland Temple was being constructed, Emma spearheaded an effort to house and clothe the construction workers.

While in Kirtland, Emma's feelings about temperance and the use of tobacco reportedly influenced her husband's decision to pray about dietary questions. These prayers resulted in the "Word of Wisdom". Also in Kirtland, Emma's first selection of hymns was published as a hymnal for the church's use. During the Panic of 1837, the Kirtland Safety Society, the banking venture that Joseph and other church leaders had set up to provide financing for the growing membership, collapsed, as did many financial institutions in the United States at that time. Emma herself held stock in the Society. The bank's demise led to serious problems for the church and the Smith family. On January 12, 1838, he was forced to leave the state or face charges of fraud and illegal banking.

Emma and her family followed and made a new home on the frontier in the Latter Day Saint settlement of Far West, Missouri, where Emma gave birth on June 2, 1838, to Alexander Hale Smith. Events of the 1838 Mormon War soon escalated, resulting in Joseph's surrender and imprisonment by Missouri officials. Emma and her family were forced to leave the state, along with most other church members. She crossed the Mississippi River, which had frozen over in February 1839. Of these times, she later wrote:

No one but God knows the reflections of my mind and the feelings of my heart when I left our house and home, and almost all of everything that we possessed excepting our little children, and took my journey out of the State of Missouri, leaving [Joseph] shut up in that lonesome prison. But the reflection is more than human nature ought to bear, and if God does not record our sufferings and avenge our wrongs on them that are guilty, I shall be sadly mistaken.

== Early years in Nauvoo, 1839–1844 ==
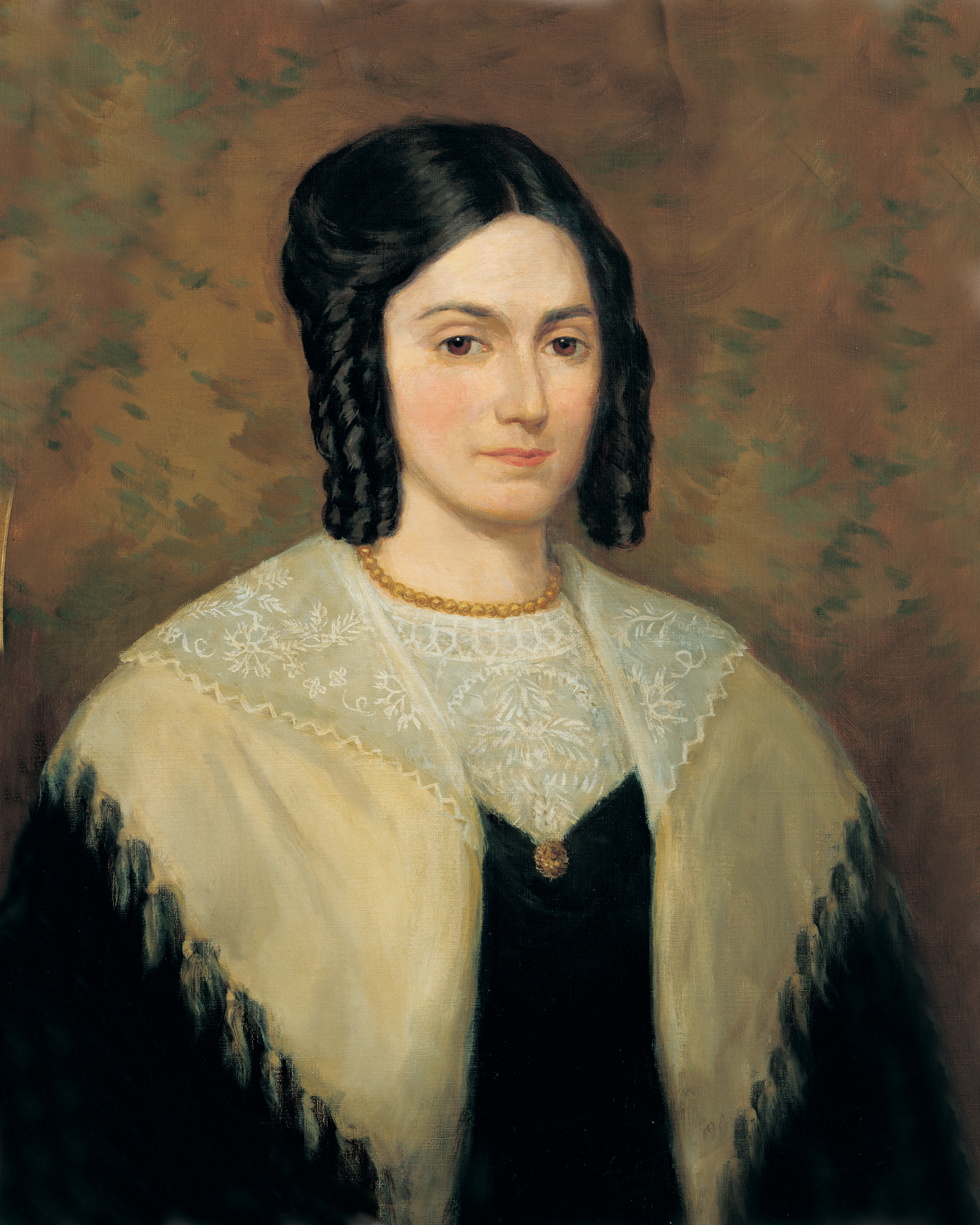
Emma Smith, painted by Lee Greene Richards

Emma and her family lived with friendly non-Mormons John and Sarah Cleveland in Quincy, Illinois, until Joseph escaped custody in Missouri. The family moved to a new Latter Day Saint settlement in Illinois which Joseph named "Nauvoo". On May 10, 1839, they moved into a two-story log house in Nauvoo that they called the "Homestead". On June 13, 1840, Emma gave birth to a son, Don Carlos, named after his uncle Don Carlos Smith, Joseph's brother. Both Don Carlos Smiths would die the next year. The Smiths lived in the homestead until 1843, when a much larger house, known as the "Mansion House" was built across the street. A wing (no longer extant) was added to this house, which Emma operated as a hotel. She often took in young girls in need of work, giving them jobs as maids.

On March 17, 1842, the Ladies' Relief Society of Nauvoo was formally organized as the women's auxiliary to the church. Emma became its founding president, with Sarah M. Cleveland and Elizabeth Ann Whitney as her counselors. She had persuaded John Taylor and Joseph Smith to call the organization the "Relief Society" instead of the "Benevolent Society". The Latter-Day Saint Biographical Encyclopedia records that Emma Smith "filled [the position] with marked distinction as long as the society continued to hold meetings in that city [Nauvoo]". She saw upholding morality as the primary purpose of the Relief Society. As "protecting the morals of the community" became her mission, Smith supported the public confession of sins; on this subject, Smith called the women of Nauvoo to repentance with "all the frankness of a Methodist exhorter." She served as president of the Relief Society until 1844. According to the minutes of the founding meeting, the organization was formed to "provoke the brethren to good works in looking to the wants of the poor, [search] after objects of charity [and] to assist by correcting the virtues of the female community". Shortly before this, Joseph had initiated the Anointed Quorum – a prayer circle of important church members that included Emma. As she had in Kirtland, Emma Smith led "the work of boarding and clothing the men engaged in building [the Nauvoo temple]". She also traveled with a committee to Quincy, Illinois, to present Illinois governor Thomas Carlin "a memorial ... in behalf of her people" after the Latter Day Saints had experienced persecution in the state.

Rumors concerning polygamy and other practices surfaced by 1842. Emma publicly condemned polygamy and denied any involvement by her husband. Emma authorized and was the main signatory of a petition in summer 1842 with a thousand female signatures, denying Joseph Smith was connected with polygamy. As president of the Ladies' Relief Society, she authorized the publishing of a certificate in October 1842 denouncing polygamy and denying her husband as its creator or participant.

In June 1844, the press of the Nauvoo Expositor, a newspaper published by disaffected former church members, was destroyed by the town marshal on orders from the town council (of which Joseph was a member). This set into motion the events that ultimately led to Joseph's arrest and incarceration in the jail in Carthage, Illinois. A mob of about 200 armed men stormed the jail in the late afternoon of June 27, 1844, and both Joseph and his brother Hyrum were killed.

== Movement schism and later years in Nauvoo, 1844–1879 ==
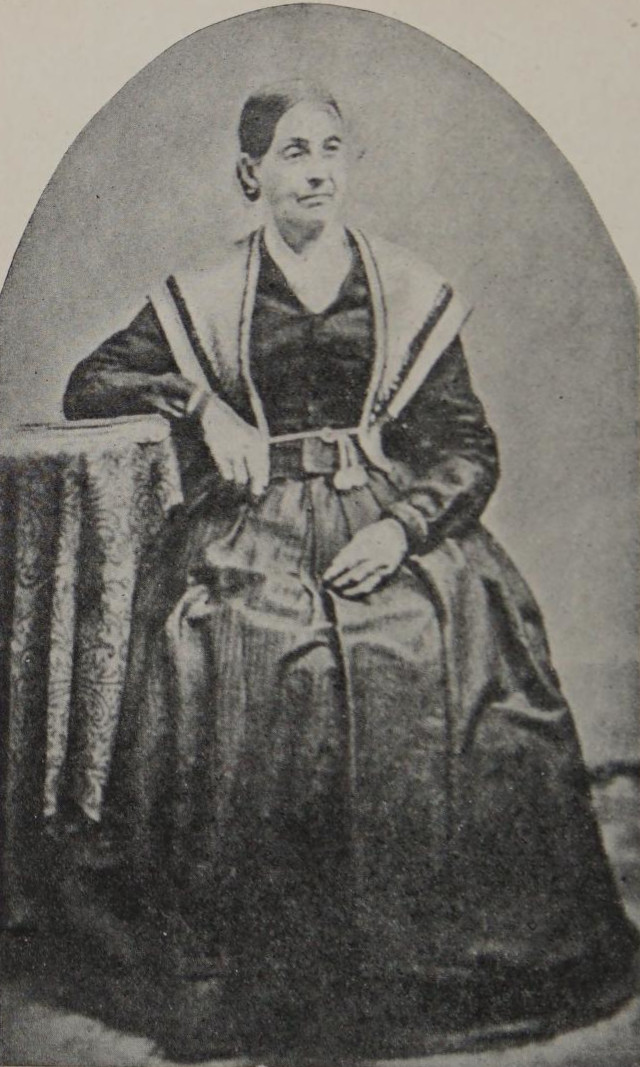
Emma later in life, ca. 1870s

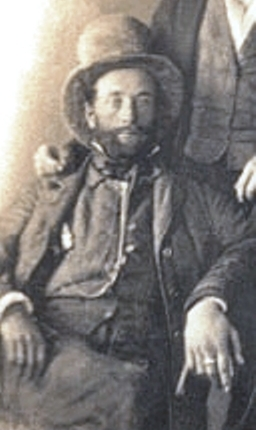
Lewis C. Bidamon, Smith's second husband

Upon Joseph's death, Emma was left a pregnant widow. On November 17, 1844, she gave birth to David Hyrum Smith, the last child that she and Joseph had together. In addition to being church president, Joseph had been trustee-in-trust for the church. What little distinction there was between Joseph Smith's personal property and that of the church was detrimental to Emma. As the Smith family's lawyer put it, "Most of the assets were in Joseph’s name as trustee-in-trust; the liabilities, however, were in his name as private citizen." Joseph had also been in debt when he died, leaving the responsibility to pay it on Emma Smith's shoulders. Untangling the church's debts and property from Emma's personal debts and property proved to be a long and complicated process for Emma and her family.

Debates about who should be Joseph's successor as the leader of the church also involved Emma. After the unexpected death of Joseph Smith's brother Samuel, within weeks of Joseph and Hyrum being killed, Emma saw William Marks, president of the church's central stake and a fellow anti-polygamist, as the most legitimate successor to the church presidency. However, Marks felt the only surviving members of Joseph Smith's First Presidency, Sidney Rigdon, was the most appropriate successor. Rigdon had been an early leader of the faith, serving under Joseph Smith in the church's highest-ranking quorum, and had been his vice presidential running mate. In a series of meetings on August 8, 1844 both Rigdon and Brigham Young presented their claims to leadership to congregations of Smith's church.

Young's argument prevailed among the majority of Joseph Smith's followers, which placed him and the Quorum of the Twelve in competition to vie for Joseph Smith's estate that included much of the church's assets as well. Relations between Young and Emma steadily deteriorated. Conflicts between church members and neighbors also continued to escalate, and eventually Young made the decision to relocate the church to the Salt Lake Valley. When he and the majority of the Latter Day Saints of Nauvoo abandoned the city in early 1846, Emma and her children remained behind in the emptied town.

Nearly two years later, a close friend and non-Mormon, Major Lewis C. Bidamon, proposed marriage and became Emma's second husband on December 23, 1847. A Methodist minister performed the ceremony. Bidamon moved into the Mansion House and became stepfather to Emma's children. She and Bidamon had no children of their own. Emma and Bidamon attempted to operate a store and to continue using their large house as a hotel, but Nauvoo had too few residents and visitors to make either venture very profitable. Emma and her family remained rich in real estate but poor in capital.

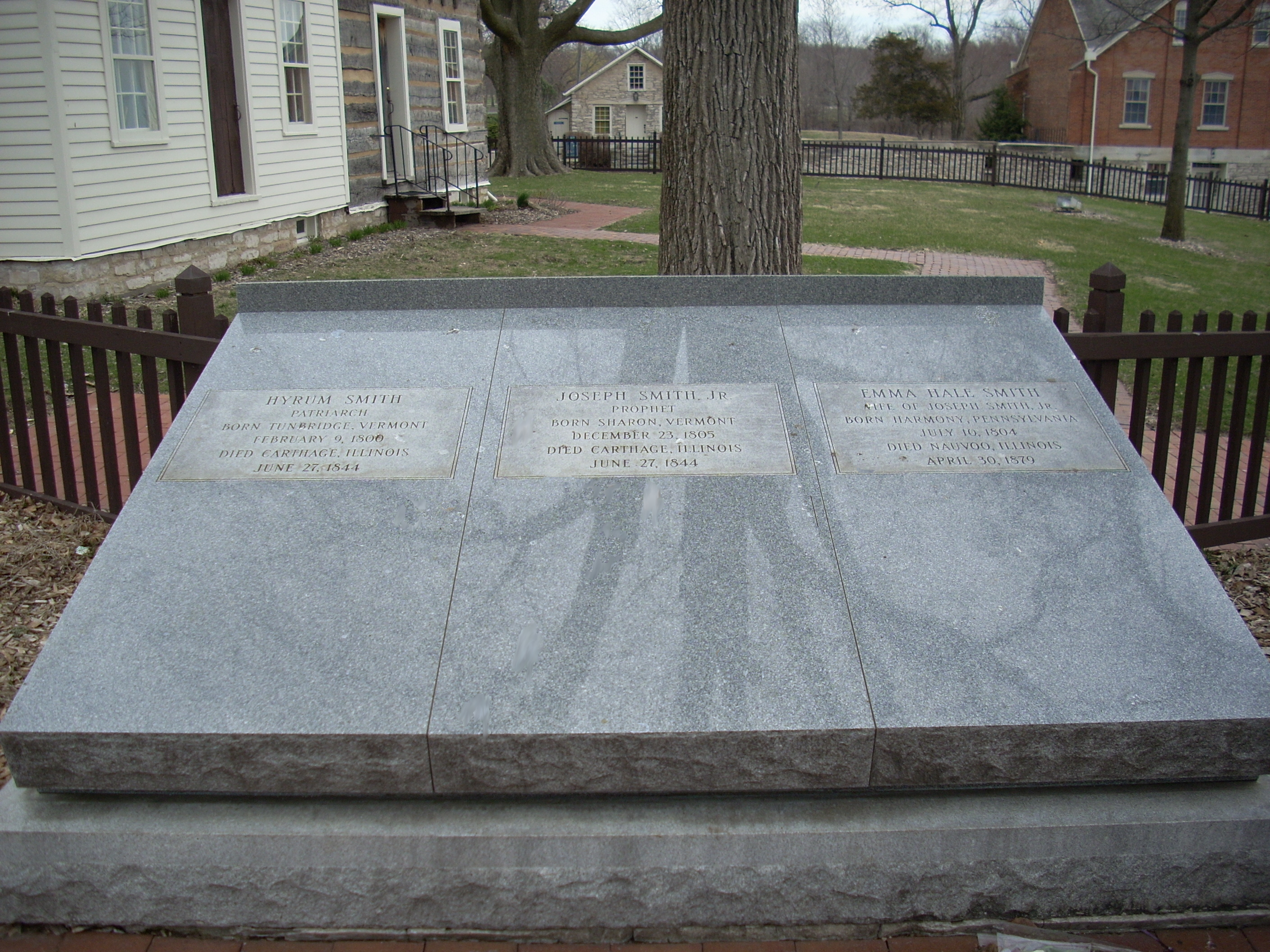
Grave of Joseph, Emma, and Hyrum Smith

Unlike other members of the Smith family who had at times favored the claims of James J. Strang or William Smith, Emma and her children continued to live in Nauvoo as unaffiliated Latter Day Saints. Many Latter Day Saints believed that her eldest son, Joseph Smith III, would one day be called to hold the same position that his father had held. When he reported receiving a calling from God to take his father's place as head of a "New Organization" of the Latter Day Saint church, she supported his decision. Both she and Joseph III traveled to a conference at Amboy, Illinois. On April 6, 1860, Joseph was sustained as president of the Church of Jesus Christ of Latter Day Saints, which prefaced "Reorganized" to its name in 1872 and in 2001 became known as the Community of Christ. Emma became a member of the RLDS Church without rebaptism, as her original 1830 baptism was still considered valid.

Emma and Joseph III returned to Nauvoo after the conference and he led the church from there until moving to Plano, Illinois, in 1866. Joseph III called upon his mother to help prepare a hymnal for the reorganization, just as she had for the early church. Smith and Bidamon bought and renovated a portion of the unfinished Nauvoo House in 1869. Emma died peacefully in the Nauvoo House on April 30, 1879, at the age of 74. Her funeral was held May 2, 1879, in Nauvoo with RLDS Church minister Mark Hill Forscutt preaching the sermon.

== Hymns and hymnals ==
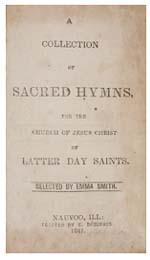
Title page of the 1841 edition of the LDS hymnal

Alongside W. W. Phelps, Emma Smith compiled a Latter Day Saint hymnal, published in 1835. It was titled A Collection of Sacred Hymns, for the Church of the Latter Day Saints and contained 90 hymn texts but no music. Forty-eight were written by Latter Day Saints, and the remaining forty-two were not. The texts borrowed from Protestant groups were often changed slightly to reinforce the theology of the early church. For example, Hymn 15 changed Isaac Watts's Joy to the World from a song about Christmas to a song about the return of Christ (see Joy to the World (Phelps)). Many of these changes and a large number of the original songs included in the hymnal are attributed to W. W. Phelps.

Emma also compiled a second hymnal by the same title, which was published in Nauvoo, Illinois, in 1841. This contained 304 hymn texts.

When her son Joseph III became president of the RLDS Church, she was again asked to compile a hymnal. Latter Day Saints' Selection of Hymns was published in 1861.

== Polygamy ==
Polygamy caused a breach between Joseph and Emma. Historian Laurel Thatcher Ulrich argues that "Emma vacillated in her support for plural marriage, sometimes acquiescing to Joseph's sealings, sometimes resisting." Although she knew of some of her husband's marriages, she almost certainly did not know the full extent of his polygamous activities. In 1843, Emma temporarily accepted Smith's marriage to four women of her choosing who boarded in the Smith household, but later regretted her decision and demanded the other wives leave. (Note: Park (2020, p. 152) summarizes, "Emma's support proved tenuous". The four women were Emily Partridge, Eliza Partridge, Sarah Lawrence, and Maria Lawrence; Emma Smith was not aware that Joseph Smith had already previously courted and married the Partridges, and they did not disclose this to Emma. See Davenport (2022, p. 138); Bushman (2005, p. 494); Remini (2002, pp. 152–153); and Brodie (1971, p. 339).) That July, at his brother Hyrum's encouragement, Joseph dictated a revelation directing Emma to accept plural marriage. Hyrum delivered the message to Emma, but she furiously rejected it. (Note: The Church of Jesus Christ of Latter-day Saints later canonized the text as D&C 132, in 1876; see Bringhurst, Newell G. "Section 132 of the LDS Doctrine and Covenants: Its Complex Contents and Controversial Legacy". Persistence of Polygamy. p. 60, in Bringhurst & Foster (2010, pp. 59–86).) Joseph and Emma were not reconciled over the matter until September 1843, after Emma began participating in temple ceremonies, and after Joseph made other concessions to her. (Note: Smith allowed Emma to destroy a copy of the revelation (though he had already had copies made), signed property over to Emma to give her and their children more independent financial security, and promised to not marry any additional women for the rest of the season. See Park (2020, p. 154): "after Joseph had copies made – she was allowed to express her frustration by destroying the document", and "Emma did not back down at all until Joseph promised not to take any more plural wives that fall. With one exception, he remained true to his word"; Davenport (2022, p. 144): "in November he [Smith] took his last plural wife – but he hardly relinquished 'all.' He even told William Clayton that 'he should not relinquish anything.' ") The next year, in March 1844, Emma publicly denounced polygamy as evil and destructive; and though she did not directly disclose Smith's secret practice of plural marriage, she insisted that people should heed only what he taught publicly – implicitly challenging his private promulgation of polygamy.

Despite her knowledge of polygamy, Emma publicly denied that her husband had ever taken additional wives. While Smith was still alive, Emma spoke against polygamy, and she (along with multiple other signatories directly involved in polygamy) signed an 1842 petition denying that Smith or his church endorsed the practice. After his death, she continued to deny his polygamy. When Joseph III and Alexander specifically asked about polygamy in an interview with their mother, she stated, "No such thing as polygamy, or spiritual wifery, was taught, publicly or privately, before my husband's death, that I have now, or ever had any knowledge of ... He had no other wife but me; nor did he to my knowledge ever have". (Note: Historians have proposed several possible motivations for Emma Smith's continued denials of Joseph's polygamy. Brodie (1971, p. 399) speculates that the denial was a form of revenge and animosity against his plural wives; Van Wagoner (1992, pp. 113–114) posits that the subject of polygamy "evoked painful memories for Emma" and she "refused to give tongue to memory simply because she could not face the shadows of the past"; Newell & Avery (1994, p. 292) note that Emma received covenants associated with the temple and celestial marriage which involved strict promises to maintain secrecy; they argue Emma may have extended that secrecy to plural marriage itself which she never directly repudiated. Newell and Avery also aver that "when Emma decided not to tell her children about plural marriage, it was an attempt to remove problems from their lives."; Quinn (1994, p. 237) points out that Emma "opposed polygamy during most of the time her husband practiced it" and proposes that she did not teach her children about plural marriage because she "regarded it as the cause of his death"; Park (2020, p. 277) states that "denial" about polygamy was Emma's "method for dealing with" the experience "[a]fter years of anguish".)

Many of the Latter Day Saints who joined the RLDS Church in the midwestern United States had broken with Brigham Young and/or James Strang because of opposition to polygamy. Emma's continuing public denial of the practice seemed to lend strength to their cause, and opposition to polygamy became a tenet of the RLDS Church. Over the years, many RLDS Church historians have continued to state that the practice had originated with Brigham Young.

== Children ==
Emma had eleven children with Joseph, five of whom lived into adulthood.

- Alvin Smith (born and died on June 15, 1828, in Harmony, Pennsylvania)
- Thaddeus and Louisa Smith (twins, born and died on April 30, 1831, in Kirtland, Ohio)
- Joseph and Julia Murdock Smith (adopted twins, Joseph died at eleven months old)
- Joseph Smith III (November 6, 1832 –December 10, 1914)
- Frederick Granger Williams Smith (June 20, 1836 – April 1862)
- Alexander Hale Smith (June 2, 1838 – 1909)
- Don Carlos Smith (June 13, 1840 – August 15, 1841)
- Unnamed son (stillborn, February 6, 1842, in Nauvoo, Illinois)
- David Hyrum Smith (November 1844 – August 1904)

== Notes ==
Church of Jesus Christ of Latter Day Saints titles
First	President of the Female Relief Society of Nauvoo; March 17, 1842 – 1844	Succeeded by Eliza R. Snow as the General President of the Relief Society of The Church of Jesus Christ of Latter-day Saints
