= Origin of Latter Day Saint polygamy =

Inception of plural marriage in Mormons

Polygamy in the Church of Jesus Christ of Latter Day Saints, called plural marriage, is generally believed to have originated with the founder of Mormonism, Joseph Smith. According to several of his associates, Smith taught that polygamy was a divine commandment and practiced it personally, by some accounts marrying between 30 and 40 wives, (Note: Estimates vary, but most historians generally place the number of Smith's polygamous wives as between 30 and 40. Example estimates: Smith counts 42; D. Michael Quinn counts 46; Compton counts at least 33; Bushman counts 32; Davenport counts 37.) some of whom had existing marriages to other men. Evidence for Smith's polygamy is provided by the church's "sealing" records, affidavits, letters, journals, and diaries. Until his death, Smith and the leading church quorums publicly denied that he preached or practiced polygamy. Smith's son Joseph Smith III, his widow Emma Smith, and the Reorganized Church of Jesus Christ of Latter Day Saints (RLDS Church, now called Community of Christ) challenged the evidence and taught that Joseph Smith had opposed polygamy. They instead stated that Brigham Young, the head of the Church of Jesus Christ of Latter-day Saints (LDS Church), introduced plural marriage after Smith's death. In 1852, leaders of the Utah-based LDS Church publicly announced the doctrine of polygamy.

== 1830s: origins ==
When polygamy was introduced into the Latter Day Saint movement is uncertain.

=== Possible revelation in 1831 ===
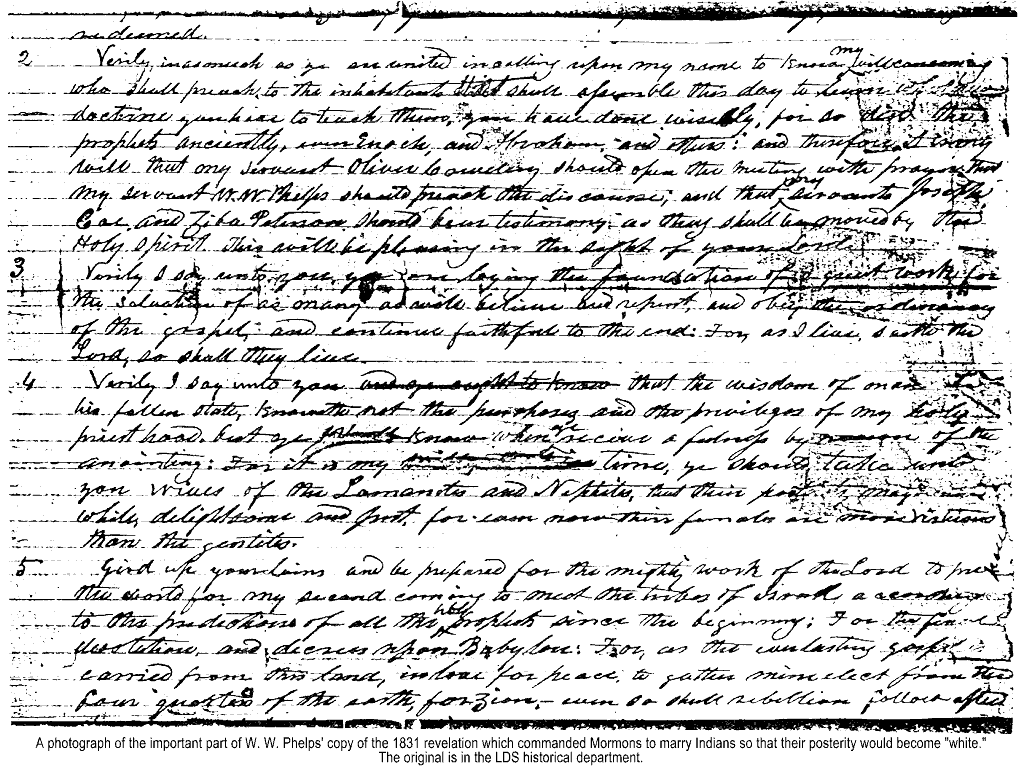
A photograph of part of W. W. Phelps' transcript of what Phelps said was an 1831 polygamy revelation by Joseph Smith. The original is held by the LDS Church's historical department.

Some scholars believe that Smith transcribed a revelation recommending polygamy on July 17, 1831. This revelation is described in a letter to Brigham Young written in 1861 by an early Mormon convert, William W. Phelps, thirty years after the revelation was said to be given. This was during a period when LDS Church leaders were justifying the practice and origins of plural marriage, particularly to Mormon splinter groups who did not agree with the practice.

The key portion of the revelation proclaims:

[I]t is [Jesus Christ's] will, that in time, ye should take unto you wives of the Lamanites and Nephites [i.e., Native Americans], that their posterity may become white, delightsome, and Just, for even now their females are more virtuous than the gentiles.

This wording is comparable with the portion of the 1830 edition of the Book of Mormon, which corresponds to today's 2 Nephi 30:5–6, which states that when Lamanites and Nephites receive the gospel they will become a "white and a delightsome people." Joseph changed the wording to "pure and delightsome" in the 1842 Nauvoo Edition. Unlike the 1831 revelation, the 1830 version of the Book of Mormon does not specify that the Native Americans would become "pure [white] and delightsome" through plural marriage, but rather through their conversion to the Gospel of Jesus Christ. A note from Phelps in the same document explains how the conversion of the Native Americans coincided with Smith's plan for a new system of marriage:

About three years after this was given [i.e., about 1834], I asked brother Joseph, privately, how "we," that were mentioned in the revelation could take wives of the "natives" as we were all married men? He replied instantly "In the same manner that Abraham took Hagar and Keturah; and Jacob took Rachel, Bilhah and Zilpah; by revelation—the saints of the Lord are always directed by revelation.

A reference was made to this revelation five months after its alleged date in a letter by Mormon apostate Ezra Booth to the Ohio Star on December 8, 1831, in which he refers to the "revelation [that the Mormon Elders] form a matrimonial alliance with the Natives", but the letter makes no reference to polygamy. This letter is significant in that it confirms that a revelation about marrying Natives occurred, but it is also problematic for multiple reasons. One is the context for the revelation. Mormon missionaries had been denied access to the Indian Territory as they lacked authorization from the US Indian Agents. They sought access multiple times and were never granted permission. To circumvent this, they were to get a license from the government to trade goods with the Indians and while trading "disseminate the principles of Mormonism among them." In addition to the trading license, marrying the Natives would be an additional means of circumventing the US Indian Agents.

The LDS Church never published Phelps's note or letter, nor has it been canonized as part of Mormon scripture. In 1943, historian Fawn Brodie stated that Joseph Fielding Smith, then LDS Church historian, told her that a revelation foreshadowing polygamy had been written in 1831 but never published, and that although its existence in the church library is acknowledged, "in conformity with the church policy", Brodie would not be permitted to examine it. Three authors assert that a second record of the revelation exists, believed to be in the LDS Church's historical department,

Though the 1831 revelation is cited by Mormon historians, non-Mormon historians, and critics, there are dissenting opinions, and no consensus has been reached.

=== Early teachings and practice ===
After Smith's death, many early converts, including apostles Brigham Young, Orson Pratt, and Lyman E. Johnson, said that Smith was teaching plural marriage as early as 1831 or 1832. Mary Elizabeth Rollins Lightner, Smith's ninth wife said that Smith had a private conversation with her in 1831 when she was twelve.

[At age 12 in 1831], [Smith] told me about his great vision concerning me. He said I was the first woman God commanded him to take as a plural wife. ... In 1834 he was commanded to take me for a Wife ... [In 1842 age 23] I went forward and was sealed to him. Brigham Young performed the sealing ... for time, and all Eternity. I did just as Joseph told me to do[.]

Pratt reported that Smith told some early members in 1831 and 1832 that plural marriage was a true principle, but that the time to practice it had not yet come. Johnson also reported having heard the doctrine from Smith in 1831. Mosiah Hancock reported that his father Levi W. Hancock was taught about plural marriage in the spring of 1832.

William Clayton, Smith's scribe, recorded polygamous marriages in 1843, including unions between Smith and Eliza Partridge, Emily Partridge, Sarah Ann Whitney, Helen Kimball, and Flora Woodworth.

=== Jacob Cochran ===
Latter Day Saint historical sources indicate that as early as 1832, Mormon missionaries were converting followers of religious leader Jacob Cochran, who went into hiding in 1830 to escape imprisonment for practicing polygamy. Mormons held two conferences at Saco, Maine, the center of Cochranism, on June 13, 1834, and August 21, 1835. At the latter conference, at least seven of the twelve newly ordained Mormon apostles were in attendance, including Brigham Young. Young became acquainted with Cochran's followers as he made several missionary journeys through Cochranite territory from Boston to Saco, and later married Augusta Adams Cobb, a former Cochranite, as one of his plural wives. Others who spent time among the Cochranites were Orson Hyde and Smith's younger brother, Samuel.

Among Cochran's marital innovations was "spiritual wifery". Ridlon wrote in 1895, "tradition assumes that [Cochran] received frequent consignments of spiritual consorts, and that such were invariably the most robust and attractive women in the community." Some new Cochranites remained polygamists, and moved from the east coast to the Mormon community of Kirtland, Ohio.

== 1840s: development and fallout ==
=== 1843 revelation ===
On July 12, 1843, Joseph Smith is said to have received a revelation that is much more widely accepted by historians. The revelation was supposedly dictated by Smith to his scribe William Clayton, and was shared with Smith's wife Emma later that day. Clayton wrote in his journal:

Wednesday 12th This A.M, I wrote a Revelation consisting of 10 pages on the order of the priesthood, showing the designs in Moses, Abraham, David and Solomon having many wives & concubines &c. After it was wrote Prests. Joseph & Hyrum presented it and read it to [Emma] who said she did not believe a word of it and appeared very rebellious. [Joseph]...appears much troubled about [Emma.]

In the text of the revelation, (Note: The 1843 polygamy revelation was made public by Brigham Young on August 29, 1852, in the Salt Lake Tabernacle and was codified in the 1870s in the church's Doctrine and Covenants.) it also states that the first wife's consent should be sought before a man marries another wife, but also declares that Christ will "destroy" the first wife if she does not consent to the plural marriage, and that if consent is denied the husband is exempt from asking his wife's consent in the future.

The revelation states that plural wives "are given unto him to multiply and replenish the earth, according to my commandment, and to fulfill the promise which was given by my Father before the foundation of the world, and for their exaltation in the eternal worlds, that they may bear the souls of men."

The revelation was not made public to the LDS Church as a whole until Brigham Young publicly acknowledged it in 1852. Young stated that the original had been burned by Smith's widow Emma Smith, though Emma denied that the document ever existed and said of the story told by Young: "It is false in all its parts, made out of whole cloth, without any foundation in truth." Published affidavits by eyewitnesses accusing church leaders of following the teaching and engaging in polygamy had resulted in Smith's murder by a mob in 1844. The revelation was codified in the LDS Church's canon as its Doctrine and Covenants section 132 in the 1870s. The 1843 revelation was rejected by the RLDS Church as not originating with Smith. Emma Smith said that the first she knew of the 1843 revelation was when she read of it in Orson Pratt's newspaper The Seer in 1853.

=== Before Smith's death ===
Records show that Smith publicly preached and wrote against the doctrine of plural marriage; however, it is also clear that Smith performed dozens of plural marriages. Allegedly, "several were still pubescent girls, such as fourteen-year-old Helen Mar Kimball". Kimball, Smith's 28th wife, wrote of her experience in 1843–44,

[My father] asked me if I would be sealed to Joseph [...] [Smith explained] the principle of Celestial marriage [...] After which he said to me, 'If you will take this step, it will ensure your eternal salvation & exaltation and that of your father's household & all of your kindred.['] This promise was so great that I willingly gave myself to purchase so glorious a reward. [...] I felt quite sore about [not being allowed to go out and dance] and thought it a very unkind act in father to allow William to go and enjoy the dance unrestrained with other of my companions, and fetter me down, for no girl danced better than I did, and I really felt it was too much to bear. It made the dull school more dull, and like a wild bird I longed for the freedom that was denied me; and thought to myself an abused child, and that it was pardonable if I did not murmur [...] Besides my father was very kind and indulgent in other ways, and always took me with him when mother could not go, and it was not a very long time before I became satisfied that I was blessed in being under the control of so good and wise a parent who had taken counsel and thus saved me from evils.

Written accounts of Smith's alleged liaisons are recorded as early as 1831, including Smith's relationship with Fanny Alger (age 16), and with Marinda Nancy Johnson (age 16) in 1831.

==== Smith's marriages ====
Timeline of Joseph Smith's marriages

Poor documentation has led to estimates of the number of Smith's plural wives ranging from 33 to 48. Among the more notable alleged wives are the teenage servant Fanny Alger and future Relief Society president Eliza R. Snow. Historians generally conclude that Smith did have multiple wives, but as Compton has written, little is known of these marriages after the sealing ceremony. Statements by William Law, who had become an enemy of Joseph Smith; Eliza R. Snow and Mary Lightner indicate that at least some of the marriages included sexual intimacy. (Note: When Heber C. Kimball asked Snow the question if she was not a virgin despite being married to Joseph Smith, she replied, "I thought you knew Joseph Smith better than that.")

The general use of the terms "sealing" (which is a LDS priesthood ordinance that binds individuals together in the eternities) to refer to the unions rather than "marriage" (a social tradition in which two adults consent to be spouses in this life) may indicate that the participants did not understand sealing to equate to marriage. In the early days of the Latter Day Saint movement, ordinances and doctrines were not always well-defined, and it is possible that different participants had different understandings of the meaning of the sealings.

==== Emma Smith's reaction ====
Polygamy caused a breach between Smith and his first wife, Emma. Historian Laurel Thatcher Ulrich argues that "Emma vacillated in her support for plural marriage, sometimes acquiescing to Joseph's sealings, sometimes resisting." Although she knew of some of her husband's marriages, she almost certainly did not know the full extent of his polygamous activities. In 1843, Emma temporarily accepted Smith's marriage to four women of her choosing who boarded in the Smith household, but later regretted her decision and demanded the other wives leave. That July, at his brother Hyrum's encouragement, Joseph dictated a revelation directing Emma to accept plural marriage. Hyrum delivered the message to Emma, but she furiously rejected it. Joseph and Emma were not reconciled over the matter until September 1843, after Emma began participating in temple ceremonies, and after Joseph made other concessions to her. The next year, in March 1844, Emma publicly denounced polygamy as evil and destructive; and though she did not directly disclose Smith's secret practice of plural marriage, she insisted that people should heed only what he taught publicly—implicitly challenging his private promulgation of polygamy.

=== After Smith's death ===
Scholars acknowledge that the tallies of Smith's plural wives include proxy sealings that occurred after Smith's death. Latter Day Saint denominations disagree as to the impact and meaning of these ceremonies. In the latter part of his life, Smith taught that all humans must be united or sealed to each other. He taught that a marriage that extends after death is also called "sealing", and that the power to perform such ceremonies was initially held only by him; members of the LDS Church believe that Smith passed the authority to the members of the Quorum of the Twelve.

==== Smith's alleged children ====
The question of children from Smith's alleged plural wives has been raised since his death. Smith has not been proven to have had children other than those born to Emma Smith. As of 2014, there are at least twelve early individuals who, based on historical documents and circumstantial evidence, have been identified as children of women sealed to Smith at the time of their births.

In 2005 and 2007 studies, a geneticist with the Sorenson Molecular Genealogy Foundation showed that five of these individuals were in fact not Smith descendants: Mosiah Hancock (son of Clarissa Reed Hancock); Oliver Buell (son of Prescindia Huntington Buell); Moroni Llewellyn Pratt (son of Mary Ann Frost Pratt); Zebulon Jacobs (son of Zina Diantha Huntington Jacobs Smith); and Orrison Smith (son of Fanny Alger). The remaining seven have yet to be tested, including Josephine Lyon, for whom current DNA testing cannot provide conclusive evidence either way. Lyon's mother, Sylvia Sessions Lyon, left her daughter a deathbed affidavit telling her she was Smith's daughter. Research into this history is complicated by Y-DNA genetic testing only being possible for descendants with an unbroken male line, and because two candidates died as infants.

Smith was accused by Sarah Pratt in an 1886 interview of allowing John C. Bennett, a medical doctor, to perform abortions on polygamous wives who were legally single, which Pratt alleged limited Smith's progeny from these wives. She based this on statements made to her by Bennett. An August 1, 1842, affidavit published by Hyrum Smith in the Church periodical Times and Seasons, also reported that Bennett had been telling women that "he would give them medicine to produce abortions, providing they should become pregnant." Orson Pratt, Sarah Pratt's husband, later considered Bennett a liar, but Sarah Pratt said, "[I] know that the principal statements in John C. Bennett's book on Mormonism are true."

=== 1842 scandal and the new vocabulary ===
Joseph Smith broke with short-lived church leader John C. Bennett in 1841 over the public scandal that arose when Bennett's practice of "spiritual wifery" became known, and Nauvoo, Illinois "rocked with tales that connected Joseph with Bennett's scandals." Bennett accused Smith of subsequently introducing new code words for polygamy—"celestial marriage", "plurality of wives", "spiritual wifeism"—to conceal the controversial practice. Sarah Pratt said in an 1886 interview that while in Nauvoo over forty years earlier, Smith was attracted to her and intended to make her "one of his spiritual wives." According to Bennett, while Pratt's husband Orson was in England on missionary service, Smith proposed to Sarah by invoking the 1843 polygamy revelation: "Sister Pratt, the Lord has given you to me as one of my spiritual wives. I have the blessings of Jacob granted me, as he granted holy men of old, and I have long looked upon you with favor, and hope you will not repulse or deny me", to which Bennett stated Pratt replied: "Am I called upon to break the marriage covenant ... to my lawful husband! I never will. I care not for the blessings of Jacob, and I believe in NO SUCH revelations, neither will I consent under any circumstances. I have one good husband, and that is enough for me."

Published allegations of adultery against Sarah Pratt and Bennett appeared in local and church publications with signed affidavits from her neighbors Stephen and Zeruiah Goddard and others. Robert D. Foster made the following allegation against Bennett and Pratt:

Alas, none but the seduced join the seducer [Bennett]; those only who have been arraigned before a just tribunal for the same unhallowed conduct can be found to give countenance to any of his black hearted lies, and they, too, detest him for his seduction, these are the ladies to whom he refers his hearers to substantiate his assertions. Mrs. White, Mrs. Pratt, Niemans, Miller, Brotherton, and others.

Pratt later said Zeruiah Goddard told her these testimonies were made under threat from Smith's brother Hyrum:

It is not my fault; Hyrum Smith came to our house, with the affidavits all written out, and forced us to sign them. Joseph and the Church must be saved, said he. We saw that resistance was useless, they would have ruined us; so we signed the papers.

Van Wagoner has concluded that the adultery charges against Sarah Pratt are "highly improbable" and could "be dismissed as slander." In addition to Pratt, Van Wagoner states that Nancy Rigdon and Martha Brotherton "also suffered slanderous attacks because they exposed the Church's private polygamy posture." Orson Pratt stood by his wife in preference to the denials of Smith, who had told him "[i]f [Orson] did believe his wife and follow her suggestions he would go to hell". Wilford Woodruff stated that "Dr. John Cook Bennett was the ruin of Orson Pratt". Van Wagoner and Walker note that, on August 20, 1842, "after four days of fruitless efforts at reconciliation, the Twelve excommunicated Pratt for 'insubordination' and Sarah for 'adultery'". However, after a brief period of estrangement from Smith and the church in 1842, Orson Pratt labeled Bennett a liar:

J.C. Bennett has published lies concerning myself & family & the people with which I am connected .... His book I have read with the greatest disgust. No candid honest man can or will believe it. He has disgraced himself in eyes of all civilized society who will despise his very name.

First Presidency member Sidney Rigdon wrote a letter to the Messenger and Advocate in 1844 condemning the conduct of the Quorum of the Twelve,

It is a fact so well known that the Twelve and their adherents have endeavored to carry on this spiritual wife business ... and have gone to the most shameful and desperate lengths to keep from the public. First, insulting innocent females, and when they resented the insult, these monsters in human shape would assail their characters by lying, and perjuries, with a multitude of desperate men to help them effect the ruin of those whom they insulted, and all this to enable them to keep these corrupt practices from the world.

According to Van Wagoner,

[Smith's] most pointed denial of plural marriage occurred on 5 October 1843 in instructions pronounced publicly in the streets of Nauvoo. Willard Richards wrote in Smith's diary that Joseph 'gave instructions to try those who were preaching, teaching, or practicing the doctrine of plurality of wives .... Joseph forbids it and the practice thereof. No man shall have but one wife'.

=== The Nauvoo Expositor ===
Rumours of Smith's involvement with polygamy continued to circulate in Nauvoo, to which Smith responded on May 26, 1844:

A man asked me whether the commandment was given that a man may have seven wives .... I am innocent of all these charges, and you can bear witness of my innocence, for you know me yourselves .... What a thing it is for a man to be accused of committing adultery, and having seven wives, when I can only find one. I am the same man, and as innocent as I was fourteen years ago; and I can prove them all perjurers".

A group of former church members were in open conflict with Smith for various economic and political reasons, and because Smith had disciplined some of them in church courts for adultery, thievery, and other crimes. William Law, a member of the First Presidency, became the head of this group. Accusations of polygamy among church leaders were published by the group in the Nauvoo Expositor on June 7, 1844, in which several signed and notarized affidavits from eyewitnesses were reproduced. The affidavit by Law stated, "Hyrum Smith [read] a revelation from God, he said that he was with Joseph when it was received. ... The revelation (so called) authorized certain men to have more wives than one at a time." The affidavit by Austin Cowles stated, "In the latter part of the summer, 1843, the Patriarch, Hyrum Smith, did in the High Council, of which I was a member, introduce what he said was a revelation given through the Prophet [containing] the doctrine of a plurality of wives."

Both Joseph and his brother Hyrum, days before their murder by a mob, spoke about the accusations at a Nauvoo city council meeting of June 8, 1844. The meeting's purpose was ostensibly to address the Nauvoo Expositor's accusations of Mormon licentiousness, though after two days of consultation, Smith and the Nauvoo city council voted on June 10, 1844, to declare the paper a public nuisance and ordered the paper's printing press destroyed. (Note: The council met on June 8 and 10 to discuss the matter.) The published minutes quote Hyrum making references "to the Revelation read to the High Council of the Church, which has caused so much talk about multiplicity of wives; that said Revelation was in answer to a question concerning things which transpired in former days, and had no reference to the present time [original emphasis]. Following Hyrum, Joseph Smith said "they make a criminality for a man to have a wife on earth while he has one in heaven" and that "the Revelation was given in view of eternity": 'He received for answer, men in this life must marry in view of eternity, otherwise they must remain as angels, or be single in heaven, which was the amount of the Revelation referred to[.]'".

In H. Michael Marquardt's opinion, "this was an attempt by Smith to obscure the real intent of the revelatory message," and W. E. La Rue emphasizes the contradiction between the statements of the two brothers. J. L. Clark writes that Hyrum's statement "appeared in the Nauvoo Neighbor of June 19, 1844, but was omitted from [B. H. Roberts's book] History of the Church, published years later in Utah." (Note: The Journal of American History's review of Clark's book states that "1844 is fairly accurate and perceptive.")

Joseph and Hyrum Smith were subsequently jailed and charged with treason against the state of Illinois for declaring martial law in Nauvoo. On June 27, 1844, in spite of a promise of protection from Illinois governor Thomas Ford, a mob attacked the prison and killed both brothers, an event that prompted a succession crisis that led to schisms in the Latter Day Saint movement that continue to this day. The majority of the Latter Day Saints followed Brigham Young when he led the Mormon Exodus to the Salt Lake Valley in 1846–47. Some Latter Day Saints remained in Illinois and the surrounding states and selected different leaders.

== 1850s: official sanction ==
In Utah Territory, Young led the LDS Church. The doctrine of plural wives was officially announced by Orson Pratt and Young at a special conference at the Salt Lake Tabernacle on August 28, 1852, and reprinted in an extra edition of the Deseret News, where Pratt stated:

It is well known, however, to the congregation before me, that the Latter-day Saints have embraced the doctrine of a plurality of wives, as part of their religious faith. ... I think, if I am not mistaken, that the Constitution gives the privilege to all inhabitants of this country, of the free exercise of their religious notions, and the freedom of their faith, and the practice of it. Then if it can be proven ... that the Latter-day Saints have actually embraced, as a part and portion of their religion, the doctrine of a plurality of wives, it is constitutional. ... There will be many who will not hearken, there will be the foolish among the wise who will not receive the new and everlasting covenant [plural marriage] in its fullness, and they never will attain to their exaltation, they never will be counted worthy to hold the sceptre of power over a numerous progeny, that shall multiply themselves without end, like the sand upon the seashore.

Young expounded on Pratt's words later that day. Young's proclamation began:

The doctrine which Orson Pratt discoursed upon this morning was the subject of a revelation anterior to the death of Joseph Smith. It is in opposition to what is received by a small minority of the world; but our people have for many years believed it, though it may not have been practiced by the elders. The original of this revelation has been burnt. William Clayton wrote it down from the Prophet's mouth; it found its way into the hands of Bishop [Newel K.] Whitney [father of Smith's 16th wife Sarah Ann Whitney], who obtained Joseph Smith's permission to copy it. Sister Emma [Smith] burnt the original. I mention this to you because such of you as are aware of the revelation, suppose that it no longer exists. I prophesy to you that the principle of polygamy will make its way, and will triumph over the prejudices and all the priestcraft of the day; it will be embraced by the most intelligent parts of the world as one of the best doctrines ever proclaimed to any people. You have no reason whatever to be uneasy; there is no occasion for your fearing that a vile mob will come hither to trample underfoot the sacred liberty which, by the Constitution of our country, is guaranteed to us. It has been a long time publicly known, and in fact was known during his life, that Joseph had more than one wife. A Senator, a member of Congress, was well aware of it, and was not the less our friend for all that; so much so, as to say that were this principle not adopted by the United States, we would live to see human life reduced to a maximum of thirty years. He said openly that Joseph had hit upon the best plan for re-invigorating men, and assuring a long life to them; and, also, that the Mormons are very good and very virtuous. We could not have proclaimed this principle a few years ago; everything must abide its time, but I am now ready to proclaim it. This revelation has been in my possession for many years, and who knew it? No one, except those whose business it was to know it. I have a patent lock to my writing-desk, and nothing gets out of it that ought not to get out of it. Without the doctrine which this revelation makes known to us, no one could raise himself high enough to become a god.

Additionally, the apostle Parley P. Pratt taught in an official church periodical in 1853 that, "We have now clearly shown that God the Father had a plurality of wives," and that after the death of Mary (the mother of Jesus) she may have become another eternal polygamous wife of God.

=== Teachings on the multiple wives of God and Jesus ===
Following the 1852 official sanction, top leaders used the examples of the polygamy of God the Father and Jesus Christ in defense of it, and these teachings on God and Jesus' polygamy were widely accepted among Mormons by the late 1850s. In 1853 Jedediah Grant who later become a First Presidency member stated that the top reason behind the persecution of Christ and his disciples was due to their practice of polygamy. Two months later the apostle Orson Pratt taught in an official church periodical that "We have now clearly shown that God the Father had a plurality of wives," and that after her death, Mary (the mother of Jesus) may have become another eternal polygamous wife of God. He also stated that Christ had multiple wives as further evidence in defense of polygamy. In the next two years the apostle Orson Hyde also stated during two general conference addresses that Jesus practiced polygamy and repeated this in an 1857 address. This teaching was alluded to by church president Brigham Young in 1870 and then First Presidency member Joseph F. Smith in 1883.

== Expansion and repudiation ==
Under Young, the practice of polygamy spread among Utah Mormons for 40 years. During this time, an estimated 20 to 25 percent of adults in the LDS Church were members of polygamist households. One third of the women of marriageable age and nearly all of the church leadership were involved in the practice. In 1890, the church repealed the practice of polygamy while under pressure by the United States government. The repeal was directed by revelation to church president Wilford Woodruff and published as the 1890 Manifesto. Polygamy was definitively ended in the LDS Church with the Second Manifesto in 1905.

== Stance of other Latter Day Saint sects ==
Though the LDS Church accepts that Joseph Smith taught and practiced plural marriage, other branches of the Latter Day Saint movement reject this position. Traditionally, the strongest rejection came from the RLDS Church. In the late-nineteenth century, the origin of polygamy was one of the principal issues that the RLDS Church and the LDS Church used to assert one organization's legitimacy over the other. Joseph F. Smith, sixth president of the LDS Church, stated in response to the idea that polygamy originated with Brigham Young rather than Joseph Smith:

A careful reading of the revelation on plural marriage should convince any honest man that it was never written by Brigham Young, as it contains references to Joseph Smith himself, and his family, which would be utterly nonsensical and useless if written by President Young. The fact is, we have the affidavit of Joseph C. Kingsbury, certifying that he copied the original manuscript of the revelation within three days after the date on which it was written. I knew Joseph C. Kingsbury well. Furthermore, the revelation was read by Hyrum Smith to a majority of the members of the High Council, in Nauvoo, at about the time it was given, to which fact we have the sworn statements of the members of the High Council.

=== RLDS Church under Joseph Smith III ===
The first RLDS Church's leader was Joseph Smith's oldest son Joseph Smith III. Smith III's opinions about his father and polygamy evolved throughout his life. In general, however, Smith III was an ardent opponent of plural marriage. Throughout his tenure as Prophet-President of the RLDS Church, Smith denied his father's involvement and attributed its invention to Brigham Young. Smith III served many missions to the western United States where he met with associates and women who said they were his father's widows. In the end, Smith concluded that he was "not positive nor sure that [his father] was innocent" and that if, indeed, the elder Smith had been involved, it was still a false practice.

=== Historical RLDS Church position ===
From the 1880s to the 1960s, official RLDS Church publications maintained Joseph Smith's noninvolvement in polygamy. This official position contradicted the testimony of earlier RLDS Church members who lived in Nauvoo during Smith's lifetime.

One of the founders of the Reorganization, Jason W. Briggs, a presiding elder in Wisconsin during the early 1840s, maintained throughout his life that Smith had originated polygamy and that God would punish Smith for his "transgressions." Briggs said that the church needed to simply deal with the issue and move on. The editor of the earliest official RLDS Church periodical, Isaac Sheen, similarly affirmed Smith's involvement. He wrote that Smith produced a revelation on polygamy and practiced it, but that he repented of this "sin" before his death. Sheen's statement was affirmed by William Marks, the stake president of Nauvoo during Smith's lifetime and a close counselor to Joseph Smith III. Marks reported witnessing Hyrum Smith read the polygamy revelation to the High Council in 1843. Marks also affirmed that Joseph Smith had repented of the practice two to three weeks before his death in 1844. Similarly, James Whitehead, an RLDS Church member and clerk for Smith, affirmed that Emma Smith gave plural wives to Smith on several occasions that he witnessed. Early in his presidency, Joseph Smith III did not believe Marks and Whitehead despite the eyewitness nature of their statements.

=== Community of Christ position ===
Community of Christ, formerly the RLDS Church, no longer makes definitive statements that Smith was uninvolved in polygamy. The church's current approach is to stress its historical abhorrence of polygamy, that members of the church and the leadership are open to continue their "ongoing quest for truth", and that the "Community of Christ takes into account the growing body of scholarly research and publications depicting the polygamous teachings and practices of the Nauvoo period of church history (1840–1846)". Further,

The research findings seem to increasingly point to Joseph Smith Jr. as a significant source for plural marriage teaching and practice at Nauvoo. However, several of Joseph Smith's associates later wrote that he repudiated the plural marriage system and began to try to stop its practice shortly before his death in June 1844.

A segment of church members continue to deny Smith's complicity, although the church no longer views the issue as important. For people concerned about the topic and how it relates to the RLDS tradition, the issue remains as much about current liberal versus conservative church politics as it does an issue of history.

=== Modern RLDS Restorationist position ===
Modern RLDS Restorationists (such as the Restoration Branches), who have broken with Community of Christ, continue to contend that polygamy originated with Brigham Young and not with Joseph Smith. They state that the revelation endorsing polygamy and attributed to Smith was first presented by Young to his followers eight years after Smith's death; they point to this delay as suggestive that the revelation did not originate with Smith. As further evidence, they often cite Smith's own critical words on the subject of polygamy. They do not see the isolated statements to the contrary by early RLDS Church leaders such as Sheen, Marks, or Briggs as credible, and they deny the legitimacy and truthfulness of sources that are commonly cited to prove that Smith was practicing or promoting plural marriage.

== See also ==
- Criticism of the Latter Day Saint movement
- Islam and Mormonism

== Sources ==
- Andrus, Hyrum Leslie (1973), Doctrines of the Kingdom, Salt Lake City: Bookcraft, p. 450
- Arrington, Leonard J. (1992), The Mormon Experience: A History of the Latter-Day Saints, University of Illinois Press, ISBN 978-0-252-06236-0.
- Bennett, John C. (1842), The History of the Saints; or An Exposé of Joe Smith and Mormonism, Boston: Leland & Whiting.
- Brodie, Fawn (1971), No Man Knows My History: The Life of Joseph Smith, New York: Alfred A. Knopf, ISBN 0-679-73054-0.
- Bushman, Richard Lyman (2005). Joseph Smith: Rough Stone Rolling. New York: Alfred A. Knopf. ISBN 1-4000-4270-4.
- Campbell, Douglas (Winter 1996), "'White' or 'Pure': Five Vignettes." (PDF), Dialogue: A Journal of Mormon Thought, 29 (4): 119–135, doi:10.2307/45228299, JSTOR 45228299, S2CID 254391172.
- Clark, Jerome Leslie (1968), 1844: Religious Movements, vol. 1, Nashville, TN: Southern Publishing Association, p. 157, ISBN 9781572580688.
- Compton, Todd (Summer 1996), "A Trajectory of Plurality: An Overview of Joseph Smith's Thirty-three Plural Wives" (PDF), Dialogue: A Journal of Mormon Thought, 29 (2), Dialogue Foundation: 1–38, doi:10.2307/45226184, JSTOR 45226184, S2CID 254388739.
- Compton, Todd (1997), In Sacred Loneliness: The Plural Wives of Joseph Smith, Salt Lake City: Signature Books, pp. 497–503, ISBN 1-56085-085-X.
- Davenport, Stewart (2022). Sex and Sects: The Story of Mormon Polygamy, Shaker Celibacy, and Oneida Complex Marriage. Charlottesville: University of Virginia Press. ISBN 978-0-8139-4705-1.
- Doctrine and Covenants 132
- Hill, Marvin S. (1989). Quest for Refuge: The Mormon Flight from American Pluralism. Salt Lake City: Signature Books. ISBN 978-0-941214-70-4.
- Howe, Eber D. (1834), Mormonism Unvailed: Or, A Faithful Account of that Singular Imposition and Delusion, from its Rise to the Present Time, Painesville, Ohio: Howe, pp. 216–222.
- Howlett, David J. (2004), "Remembering Polygamy: the RLDS Church and the Late Twentieth-Century American Spiritual Transformations", The John Whitmer Historical Association Journal, 24, John Whitmer Historical Association: 149–172. Discusses the twentieth-century RLDS struggle to remember polygamy in the context of general American religious controversies in the same era.
- Krakauer, Jon (2003), Under the Banner of Heaven: A Story of Violent Faith, New York: Doubleday, p. 90.
- La Rue, William Earl (1919), The Foundations of Mormonism: A Study of the Fundamental Facts in the History and Doctrines of the Mormons from Original Sources, New York: Fleming H. Revell Company, p. 215.
- Launius, Roger D. (1988), Joseph Smith III: Pragmatic Prophet, University of Illinois Press, ISBN 0-252-06515-8. Provides a discussion of Joseph Smith III's attempts to understand polygamy's origins and his father's role or lack thereof.
- Marquardt, H. Michael (1999), The Joseph Smith Revelations: Text and Commentary, Signature Books, ISBN 978-1-56085-126-4.
- Marquardt, H. Michael (2005), The Rise of Mormonism: 1816–1844, Grand Rapids, MI: Xulon Press, p. 632, ISBN 1-59781-470-9.
- Newell, Linda King (1994), Mormon Enigma: Emma Hale Smith (2d ed.), University of Illinois Press, pp. 89, 132, ISBN 978-0-252-06291-9.
- Park, Benjamin E. (2020). Kingdom of Nauvoo: The Rise and Fall of a Religious Empire on the American Frontier. New York: Liveright. ISBN 978-1-324-09110-3.
- Quinn, D. Michael (1994), The Mormon Hierarchy: Origins of Power, Salt Lake City: Signature Books.
- Remini, Robert V. (2002). Joseph Smith. Penguin Lives. New York: Penguin Group. ISBN 0-670-03083-X.
- Roberts, Brigham Henry (1912), History of the Church of Jesus Christ of Latter-day Saints, vol. 6, Salt Lake City: Deseret News, pp. 430–432.
- Sillito, John R.; Staker, Susan (2002), Mormon Mavericks: Essays on Dissenters, Signature Books, ISBN 978-1-56085-154-7.
- Smith, George D (Spring 1994), "Nauvoo Roots of Mormon Polygamy, 1841–46: A Preliminary Demographic Report" (PDF), Dialogue: A Journal of Mormon Thought, 27 (1): 1–72, doi:10.2307/45228320, JSTOR 45228320, S2CID 254329894.
- Smith, Joseph (1830), "2 Nephi 30:5–6", Book of Mormon: An Account Written by the Hand of Mormon, Upon Plates Taken from the Plates of Nephi, Palmyra, New York: E. B. Grandin.
- Smith, Joseph F (1939) [1919], Gospel Doctrine : Selections from The Sermons and Writings of Joseph F. Smith, Sixth President of the Church of Jesus Christ of Latter-day Saints, Deseret Book Company.
- Smith, Andrew F. (1971), The Saintly Scoundrel: The Life and Times of Dr. John Cook Bennett, Urbana and Chicago: University of Illinois Press, p. 141, ISBN 978-0-252-02282-1.
- Smith, George D. (1995) [1991], An Intimate Chronicle: The Journals of William Clayton, Salt Lake City: Signature Books, ISBN 1-56085-022-1, LCCN 89027572, OCLC 32830497.
- Tanner, Jerald and Sandra (1987), Mormonism – Shadow or Reality?, Utah Lighthouse Ministry, ISBN 99930-74-43-8.
- Ulrich, Laurel Thatcher (2017). A House Full of Females: Plural Marriage and Women's Rights in Early Mormonism, 1835–1870. New York: Alfred A. Knopf. ISBN 978-0-307-74212-4.
- Van Wagoner, Richard S. (1989), Mormon Polygamy: A History, Salt Lake City: Signature Books.
- Van Wagoner, Richard S. (1986), "Sarah Pratt: The Shaping of an Apostate" (PDF), Dialogue: A Journal of Mormon Thought, 19 (2): 79.
- Whitmer, David (1887), An Address to All Believers in Christ, Richmond, Missouri, USA: David Whitmer.
- Whittaker, David J. (1985), "Mormons and Native Americans: A Historical and Bibliographical Introduction" (PDF), Dialogue: A Journal of Mormon Thought, 18 (4): 35, doi:10.2307/45225400, JSTOR 45225400, S2CID 259901347.
- Wymetal, Wilhelm Ritter von (1886), Joseph Smith, the Prophet, His Family, and His Friends: A Study Based on Facts and Documents, Salt Lake City: Tribune Printing and Publishing Company, pp. 60–61.
