= Sarah Marinda Bates Pratt =

American Mormon critic

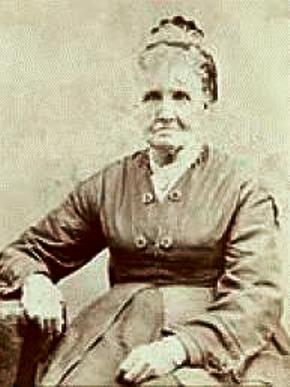
- Born: Sarah Marinda Bates; February 5, 1817; Henderson, New York
- Died: December 25, 1888 (aged 71); Salt Lake City, Utah Territory
- Spouse: Orson Pratt (estranged)

Sarah Marinda Bates Pratt (February 2, 1817 – December 25, 1888) was the first wife of LDS Apostle and polygamist Orson Pratt and later a critic of Mormon polygamy who called herself a Mormon apostate. She was born in Henderson, Jefferson County, New York, the first daughter and third child of Cyrus Bates and Lydia Harrington Bates.

== Early life and marriage ==
Sarah Marinda Bates lived in Henderson, New York, from the time of her birth in 1817 until October 1836. While she was there, her family encountered Mormon missionaries, and in the summer of 1835 she and several siblings were baptized into the faith. She also fell in love with one of the missionaries, Orson Pratt, who, after leaving to preach in other areas, returned to seek Sarah's hand in marriage. They were wed July 4, 1836, and Orson returned to his missionary travels after a three-day honeymoon. Sarah stayed with her family with only periodic visits from her husband until the couple moved in October to an apartment in Kirtland, Ohio.

== Children and migration ==
The Pratts' stay in Kirtland was short. Amidst the economic difficulties of 1837 and the failure of the Kirtland Safety Society, Sarah gave birth to their first son Orson Jr. With few financial prospects in Kirtland, the family moved back to Henderson as soon as the infant was capable of the journey, and several months later relocated to New York City. In July 1838, Orson Pratt was called to gather with a number of other church elders at Far West, Missouri, to prepare for another mission.

The move to Missouri was difficult due to Sarah's pregnancy with their second child. They reached St. Louis, and their daughter Lydia was born on December 17, 1838. Violence in Missouri led to the expulsion of the Mormons from that state, and the Pratts were forced to flee to the upriver settlements on the Mississippi. They eventually found a "shanty" in nascent Nauvoo, Illinois. There, baby Lydia fell ill with one of the epidemics that ravaged the swamplands and died in August 1839. Orson left eleven days later to serve a mission to Europe.

With her husband in Europe, Sarah had to provide for her family, and she did so by taking in sewing. She was hired by Joseph Smith's family to do some sewing, and Joseph referred her to John C. Bennett, a recent convert to Mormonism who had quickly become a close associate of Smith.

== 1842 polygamy scandal ==
In the summer of 1842, John C. Bennett was excommunicated for seducing several women into adultery. While Sarah Pratt's husband was on a mission in England, it was rumored that Sarah had an affair with Bennett. When his exploits were uncovered, he devoted considerable effort to attributing his own sexual improprieties with Sarah, and other women, to Joseph. Bennett claimed that Joseph approached Sarah while Orson was on a mission and solicited her to be one of his "spiritual wives." To counteract these allegations, Joseph Smith compiled a pamphlet of affidavits, certificates, and letters which proved his innocence and Bennett's guilt concerning sexual misconduct. This included affidavits produced by non-Mormon Sheriff Jacob B. Backenstoes and Sarah's erstwhile landlords, Stephen Goddard and Zeruiah Goddard. At the time, Sarah maintained a public silence regarding the matter. Nancy Rigdon and Pamelia Michael rejected Bennett's accusations involving them. Meanwhile, Martha Brotherton produced a damning affidavit involving Joseph Smith at Bennett's request.

Sarah's silence and the silence of her husband, Orson, were seen as traitorous. Orson was excommunicated by the apostles in August 1842 for failing to support Joseph Smith. According to Van Wagoner's article "Sarah M Pratt: The Shaping of an Apostate", Sarah was not excommunicated at this time. In February 1843 Joseph Smith allowed both Orson and Sarah Pratt to be rebaptized, and Orson was restored to his former position as an apostle. After the death of Joseph Smith in 1844, Sarah accompanied Orson Pratt to Utah.

In 1858 Sarah Pratt's former teenage neighbor, Mary Etta Coray Henderson Smith (aka Mary Ettie V. Smith), wrote that in 1841 Sarah "occupied a house owned by John C. Bennett... Prophet Joseph, who called upon her one day... alleged he found John C. Bennett in bed with her. As we lived but across the street from her house we saw and heard the whole uproar." It is unclear how Mary Etta's assertion affected Pratt.

By 1858 Orson had become the Church's apologist for the practice of plural marriage, giving the sermon explaining the rationale for the practice when it was publicly announced in 1852. By 1858 Orson had taken responsibility for eight women in addition to Sarah. But it would only be in later years that Sarah would openly take a stand on the matter of whether or not she had been seduced and by whom.

=== Evolution of contemporary Documentation in the press ===
Bennett began his public assault on Joseph Smith in the Sangamo Journal on July 8, 1842. His first mention of Sarah Pratt occurred in his letter of July 15. For the rest of the summer, Bennett journeyed between major cities, providing lectures as well as encouraging sympathizers to provide statements supporting his claims. Bennett ultimately assembled his accusations into a volume titled The History of the Saints; or An Exposé of Joe Smith and Mormonism, which was first advertised for sale in the Sangamo Journal on November 11, 1842.

In response, numerous affidavits were printed in the local and pro-Mormon Nauvoo press (e.g., the Nauvoo Wasp), most prominently from Jacob B. Backenstoes, the non-Mormon sheriff of Hancock County, and Pratt's former landlords, Stephen H. Goddard and his wife, whose name was recorded as either Zeruiah, Zerviah, or Zemiah. Sarah Pratt had boarded with the Goddards while Orson Pratt was away on missionary work in England.

The Goddards stated under oath that from the first night, Bennett "was there as sure as the night came," and that "he remained later, sometimes till after midnight." During this time Bennett and Pratt "sat close together, he leaning on her lap, whispering continually or talking very low." Zeruiah Goddard reported that on another occasion she "came suddenly into the room where Mrs. Pratt and the Dr. were; she was lying on the bed and the Dr. was taking his hands out of her bosom; he was in the habit of sitting on the bed where Mrs. Pratt was lying, and lying down over her." The Goddards said they visited Pratt in a home furnished to her by Dr. Robert Foster several times late in the evening and found Bennett and Sarah Pratt together, "as if they were man, and wife."

Before being excommunicated, Bennett had executed an affidavit clearing Smith of wrongdoing,

Affidavit of J. C. Bennett as Given May 17, 1842. Personally appeared before me, Daniel H. Wells, an Alderman of said city of Nauvoo, John C. Bennett, who being duly sworn according to law, deposeth and saith: that he never was taught any thing in the least contrary to the strictest principles of the Gospel, or of virtue, or of the laws of God, or man, under any occasion either directly or indirectly, in word or deed, by Joseph Smith; and that he never knew the said Smith to countenance any improper conduct whatever, either in public or private; and that he never did teach me in private that an illegal illicit intercourse with females was, under any circumstances, justifiable, and that I never knew him so to teach others.

Though Bennett claimed the exculpatory affidavit was obtained under duress, Foster made the following allegation against Bennett that references Pratt:

Alas, none but the seduced join the seducer [Dr. Bennett]; those only who have been arraigned before a just tribunal for the same unhallowed conduct can be found to give countenance to any of his black hearted lies, and they, too, detest him for his seduction, these are the ladies to whom he refers his hearers to substantiate his assertions. Mrs. White, Mrs. Pratt, [Margaret and Matilda] Niemans, [Sarah Searcy] Miller, [Martha] Brotherton, and others.

Sometime after the November 1842 publication of History of the Saints, Orson Pratt stated,

His book I have read with the greatest disgust. No candid honest man can or will believe it. He has disgraced himself in eyes of all civilized society who will despise his very name."

=== Pratt's claims in Mormon Portraits, 1886 ===
By 1886 Sarah Pratt was willing to go on the record regarding the seduction allegations. In 1886 Wilhelm Ritter von Wymetal (as Wilhelm Wyl) published the anti-Mormon volume Mormon Portraits. In her 1886 interview with W. Wyl, Sarah Pratt alleged that Joseph Smith engaged Bennett, a medical doctor, to perform abortions on Smith's plural wives who were otherwise unmarried. Bennett's biographer, Andrew Smith, agrees that it "was likely true" that Bennett performed abortions. At the time of the 1842 controversy, Zeruiah Goddard had claimed Bennett told Sarah Pratt "that he could cause abortion with perfect safety to the mother at any stage of pregnancy, and that he had frequently destroyed and removed infants before their time to prevent exposure of the parties, and that he had instruments for that purpose."

Despite allegations of abortions originating with Dr. Bennett and Sarah Pratt, contemporary testimony of seduced women in 1842 assert they were offered medicine to prevent pregnancy, not abortions to destroy evidence of pregnancy.

Nevertheless, Sarah Pratt recounted an incident in which

[Bennett was en route to do] "a little job for Joseph [because] one of his women was in trouble." Saying this, he took [out] a pretty long instrument of a kind I had never seen before. It seemed to be of steel and was crooked at one end. I heard afterwards that the operation had been performed; that the woman was very sick, and that Joseph was very much afraid that she might die, but she recovered.

Pratt also told Wymetal how she had refuted Smith's son Joseph Smith III's belief that a lack of progeny proved his father had not been a polygamist, writing:

I saw that he was not inclined to believe the truth about his father, so I said to him: 'You pretend to have revelations from the Lord. Why don't you ask the Lord to tell you what kind of a man your father really was?' He answered: 'If my father had so many connections with women, where is the progeny?' I said to him: 'Your father had mostly intercourse with married women, and as to single ones, Dr. Bennett was always on hand, when anything happened.'

However, Smith III's published account of the conversation contradicts Pratt's recollection:

Did he ever at such times or at any other time or place make improper overtures to you, or proposals of an improper nature—begging your pardon for the apparent indelicacy of this question? To this Mrs. Pratt replied, quietly but firmly, "No, Joseph; your father never said an improper word to me in his life. He knew better." Sister Pratt, it has been frequently told that he behaved improperly in your presence, and I have been told that I dare not come to you and ask you about your relations with him, for fear you would tell me things which would be unwelcome to me. "You need have no such fear," she repeated. "Your father was never guilty of an action or proposal of an improper nature in my house, towards me, or in my presence, at any time or place. There is no truth in the reports that have been circulated about him in this regard. He was always the Christian gentleman, and a noble man.

By 1886 Mrs. Goddard was dead and could not refute anything Pratt might say about her former landlords. Joseph Smith and Hyrum Smith were also dead and unable to refute Pratt. Pratt told Wymetal that when the testimonials were published, she went straight to the Goddards' home. She claimed Stephen ran out the back door, but that she confronted Zeruiah, who sobbed:

It is not my fault; Hyrum Smith [Joseph's brother] came to our house, with the affidavits all written out, and forced us to sign them. Joseph and the Church must be saved, said he. We saw that resistance was useless, they would have ruined us; so we signed the papers.

Pratt's 1886 accounts portray her as being a virtuous innocent, if knowledgeable about Bennett's alleged abortions on Smith's behalf. The elderly Pratt would claim: "[I] know that the principle statements in John C. Bennett's book on Mormonism are true."

== Opposition to plural marriage and apostasy ==
In 1868 Orson married his tenth wife, English-born Margaret Graham. Orson was 57. Graham was 16.

Incensed that Orson would marry a woman who was younger than his daughter, Sarah Pratt functionally ended her marriage to Orson Pratt, citing his "obsession with marrying younger women." Sarah condemned polygamy, stating:

[polygamy] completely demoralizes good men and makes bad men correspondingly worse. As for the women—well, God help them! First wives it renders desperate, or else heart-broken, mean-spirited creatures.

In 1874 Pratt testified on behalf of the Liberal candidate running for the position of Utah Territorial Representative to Congress, Robert Baskin. Baskin had accused his opponent, Apostle George Q. Cannon, of polygamy and said that Cannon's obligation to the Mormon hierarchy was greater than his loyalty to national law.

Sarah was excommunicated from the Church of Jesus Christ of Latter-day Saints on October 4, 1874. Describing herself in 1875, Pratt declared:

I am the wife of Orson Pratt ... I was formerly a member of the Mormon church ... I have not been a believer in the Mormon doctrines for thirty years, and am now considered an apostate, I believe.

Pratt lashed out at Orson in an 1877 interview:

Here was my husband, gray headed, taking to his bed young girls in mockery of marriage. Of course there could be no joy for him in such an intercourse except for the indulgence of his fanaticism and of something else, perhaps, which I hesitate to mention.

In 1878 Sarah was a strong supporter of the Anti-Polygamy Society and styled herself as a Mormon apostate. Sarah's surviving children rejected the LDS Church.

== Children ==
Pratt claimed she had resolved to "rear my children so that they should never espouse the Mormon faith while concealing from my neighbors and the church authorities that I was thus rearing them." Sarah bore twelve children, all engendered by Orson Pratt.

- Orson Pratt, Jr.
  - Married in the Mormon faith in October 1856.
  - Subsequently, declined missionary service with Brigham Young because "I informed you of the change that had taken place in my religious views."
  - Declared to church officials, "I was made a High Councilor, although I was then an unbeliever, as now... In regard to my faith... I resolved I would not accept nothing that my conscience would not receive... I have come to the conclusion that Joseph Smith was not especially sent by the Lord to establish this work, and I cannot help it, for I could not believe otherwise, even if I knew I was to suffer for it the next moment."
  - Excommunicated, 18 September 1863
- Lydia Pratt died as an infant
- Celestia Larissa Pratt
- Sarah Marinda Pratt
- Vanson Pratt
- Laron Pratt
- Marlon Pratt
- Marintha Althera Pratt
- Harmel Pratt
- Arthur Pratt
  - Deputy U.S. Marshall
  - Reported in 1882 why he was not a Mormon, "I am the son of my father's first wife, and had a mother who taught me the evils of the system."
  - Excommunicated for apostasy on 5 October 1874
- Herma Ethna Pratt
- Liola Menella Pratt

== See also ==
- Apostasy
- Children of Joseph Smith
- Criticism of the Church of Jesus Christ of Latter-day Saints
- List of former or dissident Mormons
- List of Joseph Smith's wives
- Romney family

== Sources ==
- Bennett, John C. (1842), The History of the Saints; or An Exposé of Joe Smith and Mormonism, Boston: Leland & Whiting, ISBN 978-0-252-02589-1.
- Eskridge, William N.; Eskridge Jr, William N. (2002), Gaylaw: Challenging the Apartheid of the Closet, Cambridge, MA: Harvard University Press, p. 291, ISBN 978-0-674-00804-5.
- Newell, Linda King; Avery, Valeen Tippetts (1994), Mormon Enigma: Emma Hale Smith (2d ed.), University of Illinois Press, pp. 89, 132, 139, ISBN 978-0-252-06291-9
- Sillito, John R.; Staker, Susan (2002), Mormon Mavericks: Essays on Dissenters, Signature Books, ISBN 978-1-56085-154-7
- Smith, Andrew F. (1971), The Saintly Scoundrel: The Life and Times of Dr. John Cook Bennett, Urbana and Chicago: University of Illinois Press, p. 141, ISBN 978-0-252-02282-1
- Van Wagoner, Richard S. (1986), "Sarah Pratt: The Shaping of an Apostate", Dialogue: A Journal of Mormon Thought, 19 (2): 79
- Wymetal, Wilhelm Ritter von (1886), Joseph Smith, the Prophet, His Family, and His Friends: A Study Based on Facts and Documents, Salt Lake City, UT: Tribune Printing and Publishing Company, pp. 60–61
