= Cochranites =

Cochranites may refer to:

- Socialist Union of America, a 1950s Trotskyist splinter group
- Jacob Cochran's followers, also called The Society of Free Brethren and Sisters, a New England religious sect.
- Cochrane's Craft members, also known as Cochranianism, a form of traditional witchcraft founded in 1951 by the English witch Robert Cochrane.
