= Arthur Pratt =

Arthur Pratt may refer to:

- Arthur Pratt, deputy U.S. marshall, son of Sarah Marinda Bates Pratt and Orson Pratt
- Arthur Clarence Pratt (1871–1948), office manager and political figure in Ontario
