= Rigdon =

Rigdon may refer to:

== People with the surname Rigdon ==
- Kevin Rigdon
- Paul Rigdon
- Sidney Rigdon
- W. Bradford Rigdon

== Places ==
- Rigdon, Indiana

== See also ==
- Sidney Rigdon: A Portrait of Religious Excess
