= Valeen =

Valeen is a feminine given name. Notable people with the name include:

- Valeen Montenegro (born 1990), Filipina actress, comedienne and model
- Valeen Schnurr, survivor of the Columbine High School massacre
- Valeen Tippetts Avery (1936–2006), American biographer and historian
