= Orson Pratt =

American mathematician and Mormon religious leader (1811–1881)

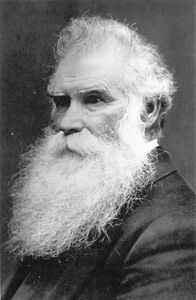

Quorum of the Twelve Apostles
- January 20, 1843 – October 3, 1881

Quorum of the Twelve Apostles
- April 26, 1835 – August 20, 1842
- Called by: Three Witnesses

LDS Church Apostle
- April 26, 1835
- Called by: Three Witnesses
- Reason: Initial organization of Quorum of the Twelve
- Reorganization at end of term: George Teasdale and Heber J. Grant ordained to replenish the Twelve

Personal details
- Born: September 19, 1811; Hartford, New York, United States
- Died: October 3, 1881 (aged 70); Salt Lake City, Utah Territory, United States
- Resting place: Salt Lake City Cemetery; 40°46′37.92″N 111°51′28.8″W

Orson Pratt Sr. (September 19, 1811 – October 3, 1881) was an American religious leader and mathematician who was an original member of the Quorum of the Twelve Apostles of the Church of Christ (Latter Day Saints). After the succession crisis Pratt continued in the Quorum of the Twelve of the Church of Jesus Christ of Latter-day Saints (LDS Church) and was a leading Mormon theologian and writer until his death.

== Church membership and service ==
Pratt was born in Hartford, New York, the son of Jared Pratt and Charity Dickenson. He was the younger brother of Parley P. Pratt, who introduced him to the LDS Church and baptized him on Orson's nineteenth birthday, September 19, 1830, in Canaan, New York.

Pratt was ordained an Elder several months later, on December 1, 1830, by Joseph Smith and immediately set out for Colesville, New York, his first mission. This was the first of a number of short missions in which Pratt visited New York, Ohio, Missouri, and the Eastern States. On February 2, 1832, he was ordained a High Priest by Sidney Rigdon, then he continued his missions, preaching in Pennsylvania, New York, New Jersey, Vermont, New Hampshire, Connecticut, and Massachusetts.

Pratt was a member of the original Quorum of the Twelve Apostles, called in 1835 under the direction of Joseph Smith. He was ordained to this position on April 26, 1835. He served as a member of the mission of the Twelve Apostles to the British Isles between 1839 and 1841. He contributed to the mission by preaching in Scotland, and producing an early missionary tract, "An Interesting Account of Several Remarkable Visions and the Late Discovery of Ancient American Records." This tract contains the earliest known public printing of an account of Smith's First Vision and also contains material similar to that later published as the 1842 Articles of Faith.

On his return to America in 1841, Pratt found the church membership in contention over several issues. Rumors and gossip were rife in Nauvoo, Illinois, and Pratt found the religious principle of plural marriage difficult to accept. He rebelled against Joseph Smith when a report by disaffected Mormon John C. Bennett accused Smith of proposing marriage to Pratt's wife, Sarah Pratt, which Smith denied. Sarah also claimed that Smith had proposed, and Pratt believed his wife. After days of Smith and the other members of the Twelve remonstrating with Pratt, they decided that he would not yield, and thus Pratt was excommunicated on August 20, 1842. Bennett claimed that Joseph approached Sarah while Orson was on a mission and solicited her to be one of his "spiritual wives." To counteract these allegations, Joseph Smith compiled a pamphlet of affidavits, certificates, and letters which proved his innocence and Bennett's guilt concerning sexual misconduct. This included affidavits produced by non-Mormon Sheriff Jacob B. Backenstoes and Sarah's erstwhile landlords, Stephen Goddard and Zeruiah Goddard. Pratt reconciled with Smith a few months after their falling out and requested rebaptism. Pratt was reinstated in the Quorum of the Twelve Apostles on January 20, 1843.

=== Conflict with Brigham Young ===
After the death of Joseph Smith, Pratt was among the apostles that supported the leadership of Brigham Young, who determined to move his followers from Nauvoo to the Salt Lake Valley, where the LDS Church became established. Not only did Pratt support Young's leadership after Smith's death, but he was also instrumental in gaining the support of the general body of the church.

As an apostle under Young's leadership, Pratt tended to disagree with him on a variety of topics but found little support from the other apostles. Young expressed an appreciation for Pratt's ability to preach but added regrettably that Pratt preached "false doctrine" more often than not. A few examples of conflicts with Young include opposition by Pratt to reestablishing a First Presidency in 1847, the legalization of slavery in Utah Territory in 1852, and Young's Adam-God teachings. Young also opposed Pratt's teachings that the One God of the Bible was a matrix of attributes shared by many individuals who had achieved exaltation to godhood.

Brigham Young attempted to minimize Pratt's influence. He did so by sending him away on numerous missions. Further, Pratt's brief period of excommunication from the church had long-term consequences. When dealing with seniority in the council after the death of Joseph Smith, Young ruled that if a council member had been disciplined and removed from the council, his seniority was based on the date of readmission. By this ruling, both apostle Orson Hyde and Pratt were moved down in seniority in June 1875. This ensured that neither would become president of the LDS Church. Even with these conflicts, Brigham Young refused to try Pratt for his fellowship in the Church, an indication of how Young was willing to tolerate differences of opinion on theological issues. After Young's death, Pratt's interpretations and opinions held more influence over the other apostles and later church leaders.

=== Missionary service ===
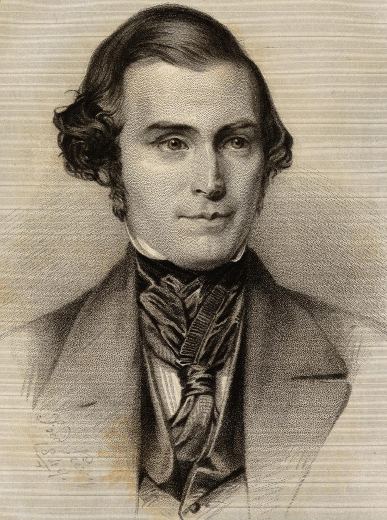
Orson Pratt in 1851

After settling in the Salt Lake Valley with the Mormon pioneers, Pratt was called to return to Europe as a mission administrator between 1848 and 1851, during which time he also served as editor of the Millennial Star. In 1850, as mission president of the British Mission, Pratt told his missionaries his strategy for spreading the gospel in an article titled, "How to Warn the Whole British Nation in One Year!" Although this goal was not achieved, by the end of the year there were twice as many LDS Church members residing in Britain as in the United States. As a mission president, Pratt was admired by the missionaries for the many logical and well-written pamphlets he wrote and published while he was there and the way he communicated with British intellectuals to discuss theology.

While presiding over this mission, Pratt received a pamphlet from Lorenzo Snow entitled "The voice of Joseph" that Snow wanted translated into French to advance his missionary efforts in northern Italy. Pratt managed to make contacts with people in Paris who were willing to do this translation.

In 1865, Pratt was one of the first Mormon missionaries to work in Austria. Traveling with William W. Ritter, he was there for nine months, but did not baptize anyone. The missionaries were eventually expelled by the Austrian government.

== Migration west ==
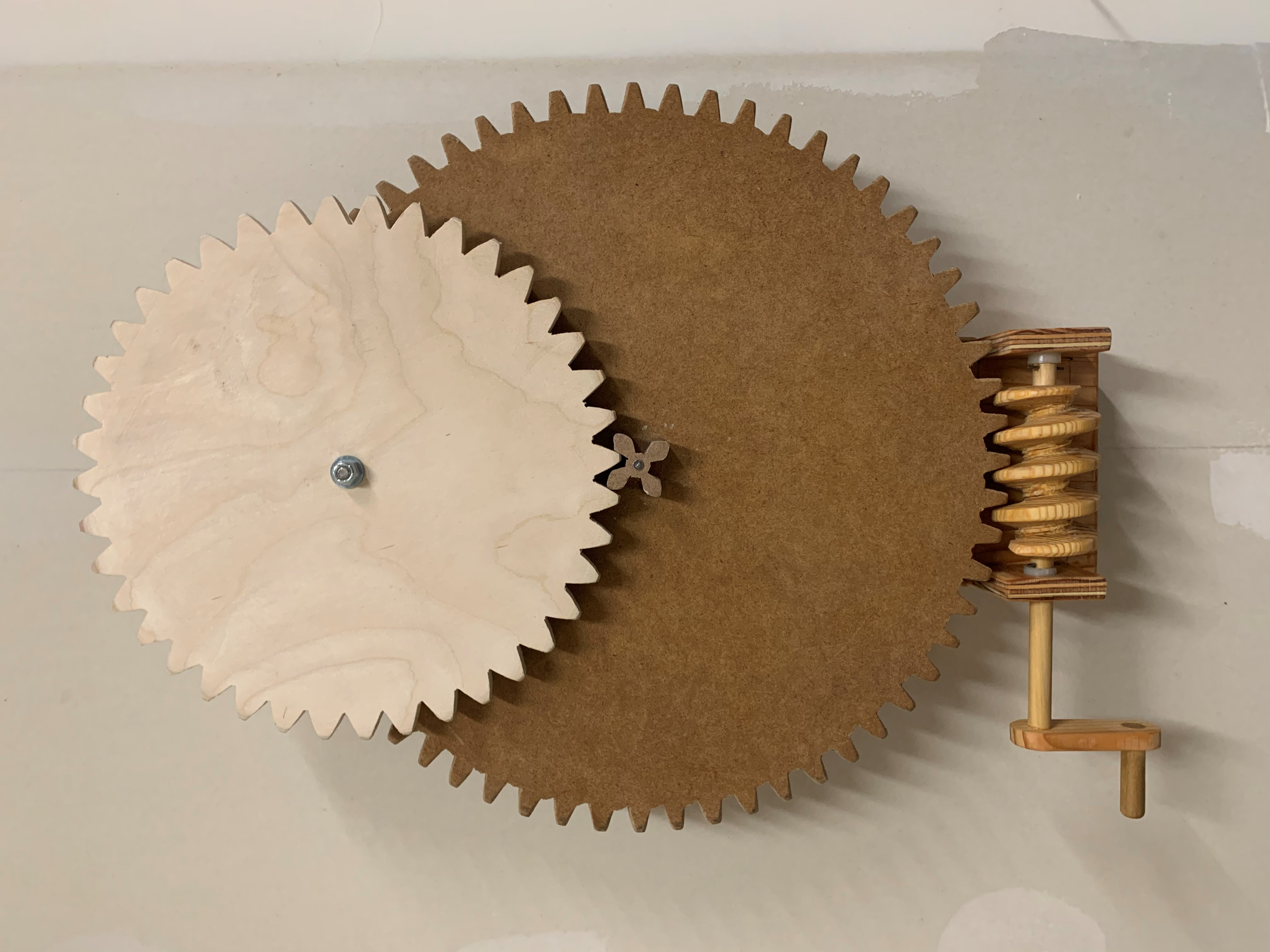
A dimensionally accurate replica of the 1847 roadometer

When news reached Pratt that the LDS Church was moving westward, he said, "We do not want one saint to be left in the United States." He helped lead the Saints "out of Babylon." Pratt was a member of Young's initial pioneer company, the "Vanguard Company", that crossed the plains to select a western site for Mormon colonization. His journals of this trip are an important Mormon history resource. As the group made their way from Illinois to Utah, Pratt acted as the company's scientific observer. He made regular readings with the company's scientific instruments, took notes on geological formations and mineral resources, and recorded information on plants and animals. He described snow on Laramie Peak on June 7, and noted that rock found on June 10, "would make excellent grindstones, being of fine grit sandstone."

As a mathematician, Pratt assisted company scribe William Clayton in the design and invention of a "roadometer", a version of the modern odometer. Intended to compute the distance traveled per day, the design consisted of a set of wooden cog wheels attached to the hub of a wagon wheel, with the mechanism counting the revolutions of the wheel. The apparatus was built by carpenter Appleton Milo Harmon, and was first used on the morning of May 12, 1847.

With Erastus Snow, Pratt entered the Salt Lake Valley on July 21, 1847, three days ahead of the main body of the Vanguard company. Several days later, he preached the first sermon in the Salt Lake Valley and formally dedicated the valley to the Lord.

== Family and polygamy ==
Some sources agree that Pratt married seven women and was the father of forty-five children, though other sources, including his first wife Sarah, claim that he married ten women. At age 57 Orson Pratt married his tenth wife, sixteen-year-old Margaret Graham.

Pratt and all of his wives and children struggled with poverty, likely because Brigham Young constantly sent Pratt on missions. Still, Pratt was able to support himself and his family by writing and publishing pamphlets on Mormon theology. Some of his wives also earned money by selling hats, fabrics, and other goods.

On August 29, 1852, Orson Pratt delivered a sermon that taught the principle of polygamy, discussing the blessings of raising many children up in the LDS Church. This was the first time the practice was discussed openly in the church. In June 1870, Pratt participated in a debate against John P. Newman on whether or not the Bible supported polygamy. He defended the practice in his writings for The Seer and throughout his ministry, gaining the title "the apostle of polygamy."

=== List of wives ===
- Sarah Marinda Bates
- Charlotte Bishop
- Adelia Ann Bishop
- Mary Ann Merrill
- Sarah Louisa Chandler
- Marion Ross
- Juliette Ann Phelps
- Eliza Crooks
- Sarah Louise Lewis
- Margaret Graham

=== 1842 polygamy scandal and relationship with Sarah Pratt ===
In 1886, Pratt's wife Sarah Pratt claimed in an interview that, while in Nauvoo, Illinois, that Joseph Smith was attracted to her and intended to make her "one of his spiritual wives" while Pratt was in England on missionary service. To Smith's proposal, Sarah replied that she would never break her marriage covenant with Orson and that she did not believe in Smith's revelation regarding plural marriage. She issued an ultimatum to Smith: "Joseph, if you ever attempt any thing of the kind with me again, I will tell Mr. Pratt on his return home."

After Pratt returned from England, Sarah later claimed another incident occurred between her and Smith at her home. Sarah Pratt's neighbor, Mary Ettie V. Smith, reported that "Sarah ordered the Prophet out of the house, and the Prophet used obscene language to her," claiming that he had found John C. Bennett in bed with her. According to Bennett, another incident where Joseph Smith tried to kiss Sarah caused her to tell her husband about the whole incident. Pratt was torn between believing his wife or Smith; he wrote, "My sorrows are greater than I can bear!" Pratt then took Sarah's side and confronted Smith, who denied Sarah's allegation and responded that she was John C. Bennett's lover. The resulting estrangement between Smith and Pratt, who stood by Sarah in preference to the denials of Smith, led to Smith warning Pratt that "if [Pratt] did believe his wife and follow her suggestions he would go to hell".

In the local and Mormon press, Sarah Pratt was accused of having had an adulterous relationship, not with Smith, but with John C. Bennett, and several affidavits were printed in local and pro-Mormon Nauvoo publications, including the leading councils of the church and from others such as Jacob B. Backenstos, a relative of the sheriff of Hancock County, though many of these allegations are believed to be falsified. Orson Pratt attempted to commit suicide in 1842. At the time, apostle Wilford Woodruff stated that "Dr. John Cook Bennett was the ruin of Orson Pratt."

A public meeting was held where a resolution supporting Smith's character was proposed; Pratt stated that he was unable to support the resolution, to which Smith replied, "Have you personally a knowledge of any immoral act in me toward the female sex, or in any other way?" Pratt answered no, but he became estranged from the church and Smith. Brigham Young, Heber C. Kimball, and George A. Smith spent several days trying to get Pratt to believe Smith, but Pratt continued to side with his wife. Finally, the three apostles excommunicated Pratt from the church. Sarah was not excommunicated at this time. Both Orson and Sarah were rebaptized by Joseph Smith when they returned to the church in 1843. Orson did not ever consider himself truly excommunicated, and neither, by one interpretation, did Smith.

Bennett claimed that Pratt and his wife were planning to leave Nauvoo and help him "expose Mormonism," but Pratt published a statement in the October 1, 1842 Nauvoo Wasp to deny this claim. Pratt soon returned to the church and denounced Bennett. Van Wagoner cites a letter written by Pratt's brother Parley P. Pratt which said that Orson was a part of the church and that Bennett's book, The History of the Saints (1842), was written solely to get vengeance on those who had excommunicated him and barely worth mentioning. Pratt wrote a postscript to his brother's letter: "J.C. Bennett has published lies concerning myself & family & the people with which I am connected".

Smith and Pratt directly discussed Pratt's wife, with Smith stating to him, "She lied about me: I never made the offer which she said I did," after which Joseph suggested he divorce Sarah and start a new family. Pratt did not divorce Sarah at that time, though one source does report that Orson came to believe that Sarah had lied about Smith's proposal. This event would impact the couple for the rest of their lives; they eventually did divorce, though decades later. Sarah secretly encouraged her children not to believe in Mormon teachings. She and her sons, Orson Pratt Jr., and Arthur Pratt eventually apostatized from the church.

== Writer, historian and philosopher ==
While in Illinois, Pratt acted as an instructor of mathematics at the University of Nauvoo.

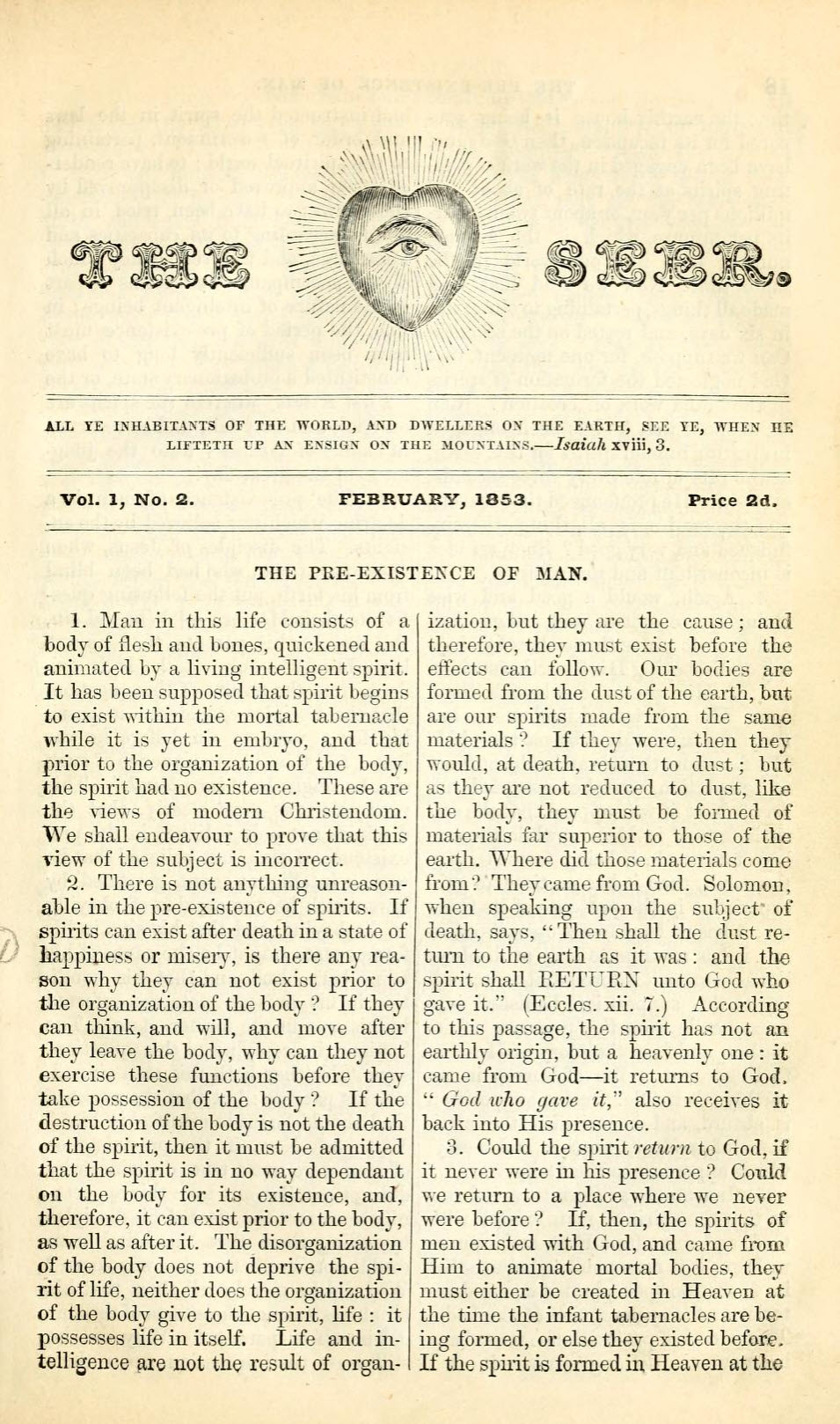
Second issue of The Seer February, 1853.

In Utah, Pratt's strong skills in analysis and writing led Young to assign him to produce sermons and pamphlets dealing with religious topics. Pratt wrote sixteen pamphlets in defense of LDS Church doctrines, drawing on the works of Joseph Smith and his brother Parley P. Pratt. These include "Divine Authority, or the Question, Was Joseph Smith Sent of God?" in 1848 and "Divine Authenticity of the Book of Mormon" in 1850 and 1851. His pamphlet "An Interesting Account of Several Remarkable Visions" was the first published account of the First Vision and included a list of beliefs that is similar to Smith's 1842 "Articles of Faith". In "Absurdities of Immaterialism", Pratt defended the Mormon doctrine of materiality, with reference to science, philosophy, and theology. As part of his system of Mormon theology, Pratt embraced the philosophical doctrine of hylozoism.

Although these materials were primarily used in the mission field, Pratt was also a church spokesman on the topic of plural marriage. At a special conference in Salt Lake City in August 1852, Pratt publicly preached a sermon announcing the doctrine of plural marriage. He later published an essay in defense of the practice in 12 monthly installments in the church periodical The Seer, which provides the most complete defense of the Mormon doctrine during this period. Pratt himself is considered one of the most influential early apologists for the LDS Church.

Pratt's views were not always without controversy. In 1865, a majority of the First Presidency and the Quorum of the Twelve Apostles of the LDS Church officially condemned some of Pratt's doctrinal writings, including some of his articles from The Seer. They considered it to be misleading and questionable in relation to the actual doctrine of the Church. Though his many controversial beliefs have been rejected by Brigham Young and other Church leaders, Pratt's writings have nevertheless influenced many modern Mormon beliefs, including their concept of God and the doctrine of the gathering of Israel.

In 1869, Pratt transliterated a portion of the Book of Mormon into the Deseret Alphabet.

Pratt acted as Church Historian and Recorder from 1874 until his death. He edited many church periodicals and helped divide editions of the Book of Mormon and Doctrine and Covenants into verses and provided footnoted cross references. He served seven terms as Speaker of the House in the Utah legislature.

=== Science publications and lectures ===
Pratt was known as an accomplished mathematician and had a strong interest in astronomy. The disciplines combined with others to form in his mind a philosophy of what might be called 'early' Mormon cosmology. He offered science-based lectures on these topics to early Mormon audiences in Utah and published two related books. New and Easy Method of Solution of the Cubic and Biquadratic Equations was published in 1866, and Key to the Universe was published in 1879. The former is claimed to have been used as a textbook in England, Germany, and France, as Pratt was known as a talented mathematician even outside of Mormon circles.

In October 1851, Orson Pratt taught mathematics in the 'Parent School' of the University of Deseret. The Thirteenth Ward School House was used for a classroom. On December 15, 1851, he commenced a series of lectures on astronomy and its religious implications, in the Council House. These educational efforts technically were part of an adult educational program.

=== List of published works ===
- An Interesting Account of Several Remarkable Visions (1842) Project Gutenberg Kindle, epub, html, and text editions
- Absurdities of Immaterialism (1849) Project Gutenberg Kindle, epub, html, and text editions
- Cubic and Biquadratic Equations (1866)
- Key to the Universe (1866)
- The Bible and Polygamy (1870)

== Death ==
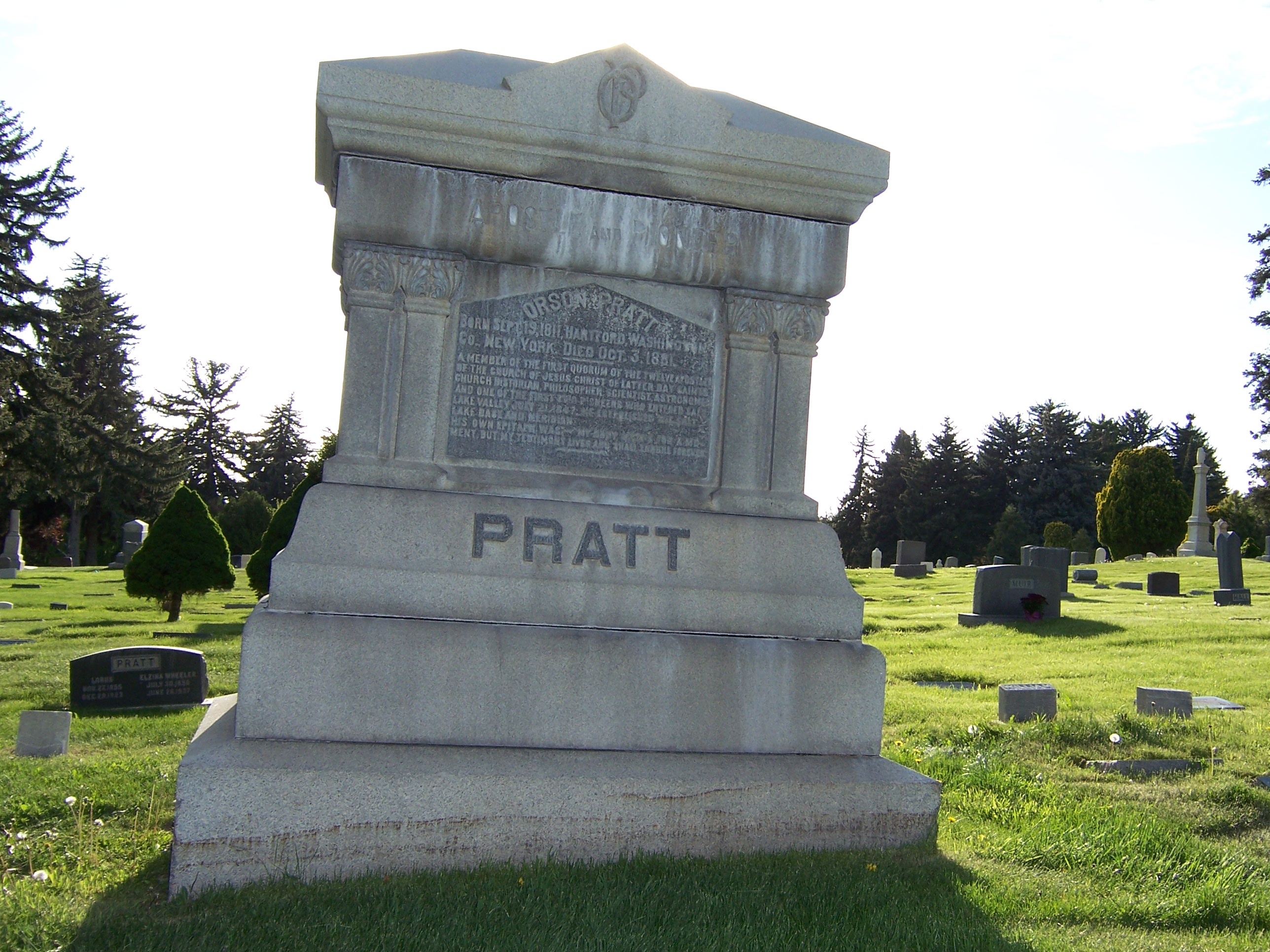
Headstone of Orson Pratt Sr., located at Plot I_2_13_1E in the Salt Lake City Cemetery, inscribed, in part, "His own epitaph was:~ My body sleeps for a mo-ment, but my testimony lives and shall endure forever.".

At age 70, Orson Pratt, the last surviving member of the original Quorum of the Twelve Apostles, died “as if in a gentle slumber” on his couch, surrounded by family members, at his home in Salt Lake City. Diabetes, according to one Dr. Castle, was the cause of death. In the year or so preceding his death, though Pratt's diabetes rendered him “feeble” and often “unable to leave his room,” he recovered enough to express to a congregation gathered in the Salt Lake Tabernacle only days before his death that he desired to live on and again “lift up his voice as a missionary to the nations of the earth.”

== See also ==
- List of people with the most children
- Quorum of the Twelve

== Sources ==
- Allen, James B.; Leonard, Glen M. (1992). The Story of the Latter-day Saints (2 ed.). Salt Lake City, Utah: Deseret Book Co. ISBN 0-87579-565-X.
- Bergera, Gary James (1992). "Seniority in the Twelve: The 1875 Realignment of Orson Pratt". Journal of Mormon History. 18 (1): 19–58. Archived from the original on 2011-06-13.
- Bergera, Gary James (2002). Conflict in the Quorum: Orson Pratt, Brigham Young, Joseph Smith (eBook ed.). Salt Lake City, Utah: Signature Books. ISBN 9781560851646.
- Godfrey, Matthew C.; Smith, R. Eric; Grow, Matthew J.; Esplin, Ronald K., eds. (2020). The Joseph Smith Papers, Documents, Volume 11: September 1842-February 1843. Deseret Book Company. ISBN 9781649330123.
- Bushman, Richard (2005). Joseph Smith: Rough Stone Rolling. New York: Alfred A. Knopf. ISBN 978-1-400-04270-8.
- Chisholm, Hugh, ed. (1911). "Pratt, Orson" . Encyclopædia Britannica (11th ed.). Cambridge University Press.
- England, Breck (1985). The Life and Thought of Orson Pratt. Salt Lake City, Utah: University of Utah Press. ISBN 0874802490.
- Ludlow, Daniel H. (1992). Daniel H. Ludlow (ed.). Church History, Selections From the Encyclopedia of Mormonism. Salt Lake City, Utah: Deseret Book Co. ISBN 0-87579-924-8.
- May, Dean L. (1987). Utah: A People's History. Salt Lake City, Utah: Bonneville Books. ISBN 0-87480-284-9.
- Smith, Andrew F. (1971). The Saintly Scoundrel: The Life and Times of Dr. John Cook Bennett. Urbana and Chicago: University of Illinois Press. p. 141. ISBN 978-0-252-02282-1.
- Smith, George D. (2011). Nauvoo polygamy : "but we called it celestial marriage" (2nd ed.). Salt Lake City: Signature Books. ISBN 978-1-56085-326-8. OCLC 1011497630.
- Van Wagoner, Richard S. (1986). "Sarah Pratt: The Shaping of an Apostate". Dialogue: A Journal of Mormon Thought. 19 (2): 79..
- Watson, E.J., ed. (1975). The Orson Pratt Journals. Salt Lake City: Elden Jay Watson. p. 180.
- Whittaker, David J. (1994). The Essential Orson Pratt. Salt Lake City, Utah: Signature Books. ISBN 0-941214-95-8.

Church of Jesus Christ of Latter Day Saints titles Later renamed: The Church of Jesus Christ of Latter-day Saints (1844)
| Preceded by Amasa M. Lyman | Quorum of the Twelve Apostles; January 20, 1843–October 3, 1881 | Succeeded by Ezra T. Benson |
Church of the Latter Day Saints titles Later renamed: Church of Jesus Christ of Latter Day Saints (1838)
| Preceded by William Smith | Quorum of the Twelve Apostles; April 26, 1835–August 20, 1842 | Succeeded by John F. Boynton |
