= Fanny Alger =

Alleged first plural wife of Joseph Smith (c. 1816–1889)

- Born: Fanny W. Alger; September 30, 1816 c. Bloomfield, New York
- Died: November 29, 1889 (aged 73); Indianapolis, Indiana
- Spouse: Solomon Franklin Custer (m. 1836)
- Children: 9

Fanny W. Alger Custer (c. September 30, 1816 – November 29, 1889) was possibly the first plural wife of Joseph Smith, the founder of the Latter Day Saint movement.

== Biography ==
Alger was born to Samuel Alger and Clarissa Hancock on September 30, 1816 or 1817, in Bloomfield, New York, the second of eight children. Samuel grew up working at sawmills and was a carpenter and joiner by trade. Clarissa was a sister of Levi W. Hancock, a leader in the Latter Day Saint movement after 1830.

The Algers left Bloomfield for Ashtabula, Ohio sometime around 1820, and then in 1825 to Mayfield, Ohio, ten miles southwest of Kirtland, Ohio. In 1830, many of the Hancock extended family, as well as Clarissa and Samuel, were among the first to join the Church of Christ in Mayfield, months before the congregation grew to include settlers in Kirtland.

Sometime in the winter of 1832, Emma Smith hired Fanny, either as a house servant or dairymaid. There is some dispute on this point: David Golding argues that Fanny was only hired as a dairymaid and did not likely move into the Smith household. His argument is based on observations that dairy production was a major home industry in the region powered primarily by the labor of women, and that the Smiths owned between four and nine cows and had recently lost their previous dairymaid, Mary Beal Johnson, due to an untimely death. However, no contemporary records provide direct evidence that Fanny was employed exclusively as a dairymaid and not living in the Smith residence, whereas several later sources (albeit mostly second or third-hand reminiscences) specifically state that Fanny was living in the Smith household and under their care. Todd Compton and Mark Staker both conclude that Fanny lived in the Smith household for a time as an employed servant, during which time she entered a relationship with Joseph Smith.

In September 1836, after Fanny had worked for Emma Smith, the Algers left the Kirtland area for Clay County, Missouri. Fanny's uncle Levi Hancock conveyed her to her parents somewhere between Wooster, Ohio and Dublin, Indiana. The Algers' wagon broke down outside of Dublin where the Paul and Mary Custer family kept a tavern and hosted them. On November 16, Fanny was married to Paul and Mary's son Solomon at the Custer tavern by the town's justice of the peace. Samuel and Clarissa Alger remained in Dublin for another year before continuing on to Missouri. Fanny and Solomon continued the Custers' tavern business, eventually keeping a grocery store and bakery, and launching a short-lived sawmill in 1870. Obituaries for Solomon and Fanny mention Fanny bearing nine children, though only five can be positively identified, two of whom survived her. Other Custer in-laws in Dublin started the local Universalist church months after Fanny's marriage, but she did not join until 1874. Her funeral was held at the Dublin church after she died at the home of her son in Indianapolis, Indiana, on November 29, 1889.

Many years later, an early acquaintance remembered the young Alger of Kirtland as a "very nice and comely young woman ... toward whom ... everyone seemed partial for the amiability of her character". Her obituary reported that in Indiana she was "generally beloved by all who knew her and was noted for her benevolence of spirit and generous-heartedness". Her Universalist congregation memorialized her as "a firm believer in the Great Salvation" and one who met "with great courage and resolution the cares and perplexities that beset her through life".

== Relationship with Joseph Smith ==
In January 1838, a year and a half after the Algers had left Kirtland, Oliver Cowdery, one of the Three Witnesses to the authenticity of the Book of Mormon, wrote to his brother about feeling dishonored by Joseph Smith's claims that Cowdery had admitted to having "willfully lied" and spreading rumors. Cowdery referred to a "dirty, nasty, filthy affair of [Smith] and Fanny Alger's ... in which I strictly declared that I had never deserted from the truth in the matter, and as I supposed was admitted by himself". Members of the high council and bishopric, led by Thomas B. Marsh at Joseph Smith's appointment, investigated Cowdery and other members of the Missouri presidency for a variety of offenses, including slander against Smith. Rumors about Smith and Alger, Smith and "an orphan girl", and other scandals apparently diminished, with Alger's name disappearing from the historical record of Church of Jesus Christ of Latter Day Saints for decades. A number of stories about her relationship with Smith resurfaced during the late nineteenth century during periods of intense antipolygamy campaigns against Utah Mormons. Secondhand witnesses, Mormon and non-Mormon, variously alleged that Smith had married Alger as a plural wife or had an extramarital sexual relationship with her. Historians are divided over the reliability of these secondhand reports and whether the evidence is strong enough to conclude precisely what kind of relation existed between Alger and Smith.

== See also ==
- List of Joseph Smith's wives
