= Spiritual wifery =

Relationship observed in some Christian sects of the 18th and 19th centuries

Spiritual wifery is a term first used in America by the Immortalists in and near the Blackstone Valley of Rhode Island and Massachusetts in the 1740s. The term describes the idea that certain people are divinely destined to meet and share their love (at differing points along the carnal-spiritual spectrum, depending on the particular religious movement involved) after receiving a spiritual confirmation, and regardless of previous civil marital bonds. Its history in Europe among various Christian primitivistic movements has been well documented. The followers of Jacob Cochran as early as 1818 used "spiritual wifery" to describe their religious doctrine of free love. Often confused with polygamy, spiritual wifery among the Cochranites was the practice in which communal mates were temporarily assigned and reassigned, either by personal preference or religious authority.

The term was later introduced to the Latter Day Saint movement by John C. Bennett, who openly applied it to the doctrine of plural marriage. According to Helen Mar Whitney, "At the time [in Nauvoo] spiritual wife was the title by which every woman who entered into this order was called, for it was taught and practiced as a spiritual order." Bennett was soon excommunicated for such offenses.

The term complex marriage was later used by the Oneida Community in the 1840s to describe a free marriage practice similar to spiritual wifery.

== See also ==
- Complex marriage
- Spiritual marriage
