= Sidney Rigdon: A Portrait of Religious Excess =

- Author: Richard S. Van Wagoner
- Language: English
- Publisher: Signature Books
- Publication date: December 1994
- Publication place: United States
- Pages: 640
- ISBN: 978-1-56085-030-4

Sidney Rigdon: A Portrait of Religious Excess is a 1994 biography of the early Latter Day Saint leader Sidney Rigdon written by Richard S. Van Wagoner. It is published by Signature Books.

The biography was recognized in reviews as the most comprehensive biography of Rigdon produced. The book won awards from the Mormon History Association and the John Whitmer Historical Association but was criticized by Mormon apologists as "defective" and one that "still leaves more to be desired".
