= Mosiah Hancock =

American Mormon pioneer (1834–1907)

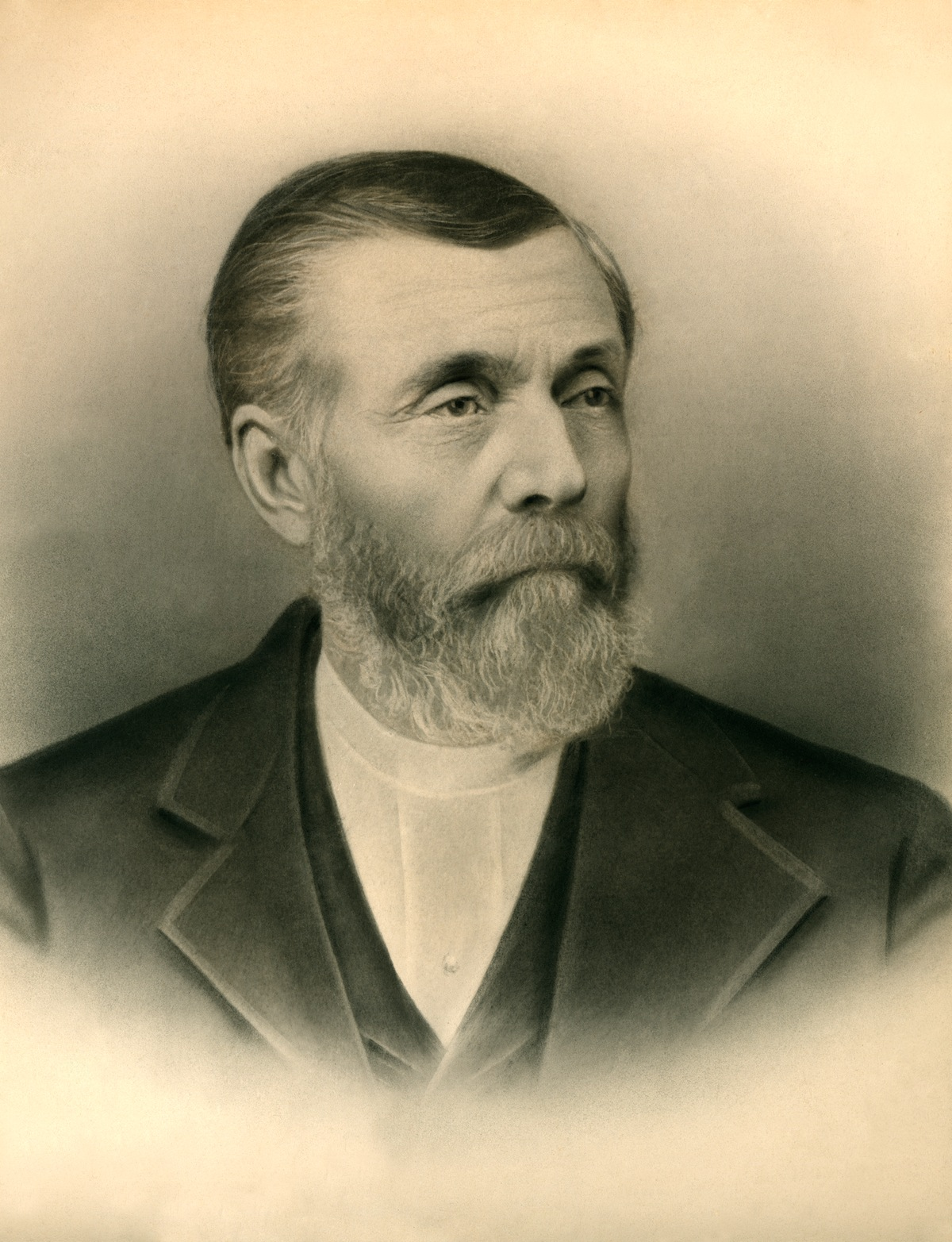

Personal details
- Born: Mosiah Lyman Hancock; April 9, 1834; Kirtland, Ohio, United States
- Died: January 14, 1907 (aged 72); Safford, Arizona Territory, United States
- Resting place: Hubbard Cemetery; 32.909°N 109.77°W
- Spouse(s): Margaret A. McCleve; Martha M. Mayer; Sarah Tew; Ester C. Mayer; Verina Rentisman
- Children: 30
- Parents: Levi W. Hancock; Clarissa Reed

Mosiah Lyman Hancock (April 9, 1834 – January 14, 1907) was an early member of the Church of Jesus Christ of Latter-day Saints and was son of Levi Ward Hancock and Clarissa Reed Hancock. Mosiah is known for his vision of the pre-earth life and of his firsthand account of a prophecy of Joseph Smith.

== Personal life ==
Hancock was born in Kirtland, Ohio. His journal reports living in a house in Kirtland which had two rooms. As one of the early children of Levi W. Hancock, a prominent early member of the Church of Jesus Christ of Latter Day Saints, he was baptized on April 10, 1842, by John Taylor. As a young boy, Mosiah had close associations with Joseph Smith and kept accounts of him in his journal. Later, he crossed the plains with the Mormon pioneers and became one of the original Mormon settlers of Arizona.

Following the death of Joseph Smith, Mosiah followed Brigham Young and the Church of Jesus Christ of Latter-day Saints to what is now known as Utah.

== Writings ==
His first-hand account reports that Smith prophesied the settlements of the Mormon people in Utah and Arizona. His vision of the pre-earth life is recorded in many books and is one of the most complete visions of the pre-earth life in LDS theology. Although not accepted as official LDS Church doctrine, it has been a primary resource for some writers. Mosiah's other journal writings also provide insight into early LDS culture and beliefs touching such topics as plural marriage, Mormon life in Kirtland, early dealings with the Utah natives, and early establishment of Mormon settlements in Arizona.

== See also ==
- Mormon folklore
