= Mormon Enigma =

1984 biography of Emma Hale Smith

Mormon Enigma: Emma Hale Smith
- Cover of the first edition
- Authors: Linda King Newell; Valeen Tippetts Avery
- Language: English
- Subject: Emma Hale Smith
- Publisher: Doubleday & Company, Inc.
- Publication date: 1984
- Publication place: United States
- Media type: Print (Hardcover)
- Pages: 394 (first edition)
- ISBN: 0-385-17166-8
- OCLC: 10376019
- Dewey Decimal: 289.3/092/4 B 19
- LC Class: BX8695.S515 N48 1984
- Followed by: 1994 2nd edition

Mormon Enigma: Emma Hale Smith, Prophet's Wife, "Elect Lady," Polygamy's Foe is a biography of Emma Hale Smith, wife of Joseph Smith Jr., written by Linda King Newell and Valeen Tippetts Avery.

Generally accepted as a groundbreaking biography, the book places Emma Smith into a context that has better explained the trials and sacrifices of the members of the early Latter Day Saint church. The work made possible, along with other more recent historical works, a major reinterpretation of the formative period of Mormonism.

The book won the 1984 Best Book Award for interpretive history by the Mormon History Association.

Avery and Newell provided the following note in the book's introduction:

Early leaders in Utah castigated Emma from their pulpits for opposing Brigham Young and the practice of polygamy, and for lending support to the Reorganization. As these attitudes filtered down through the years, Emma was virtually written out of official Utah histories. In this biography, we have attempted to reconstruct the full story of this remarkable and much misunderstood woman's experiences.

— Author's note in their introduction

Despite its quality and recognition, the biography was startling and controversial among leaders, administrators and members of The Church of Jesus Christ of Latter-day Saints. Shortly after publication, Avery and Newell, both participating members in the church, were refused any opportunity to talk about their research or book in church meetings. In the preface to the second edition of the book, the authors wrote: "After a ten-months stalemate Linda Newell successfully petitioned church leaders to reconsider the prohibition. On April 26, 1986, she was informed that the restrictions [...] were no longer in effect." Yet the fact that the lifting of that ban was not reported by the church-owned newspaper Deseret News led them to say that it "gave the unmistakable message to faithful church members that both the book and its authors were still suspect."

== Publication information ==
- Newell, Linda King and Avery, Valeen T. Mormon Enigma: Emma Hale Smith, Prophet's Wife, Elect Lady, Polygamy's Foe. Doubleday Publishing, September 1984. ISBN 0-385-17166-8. 2nd edition. rev., Urbana, IL: University of Illinois Press, 1994.
