= The Seer (periodical) =

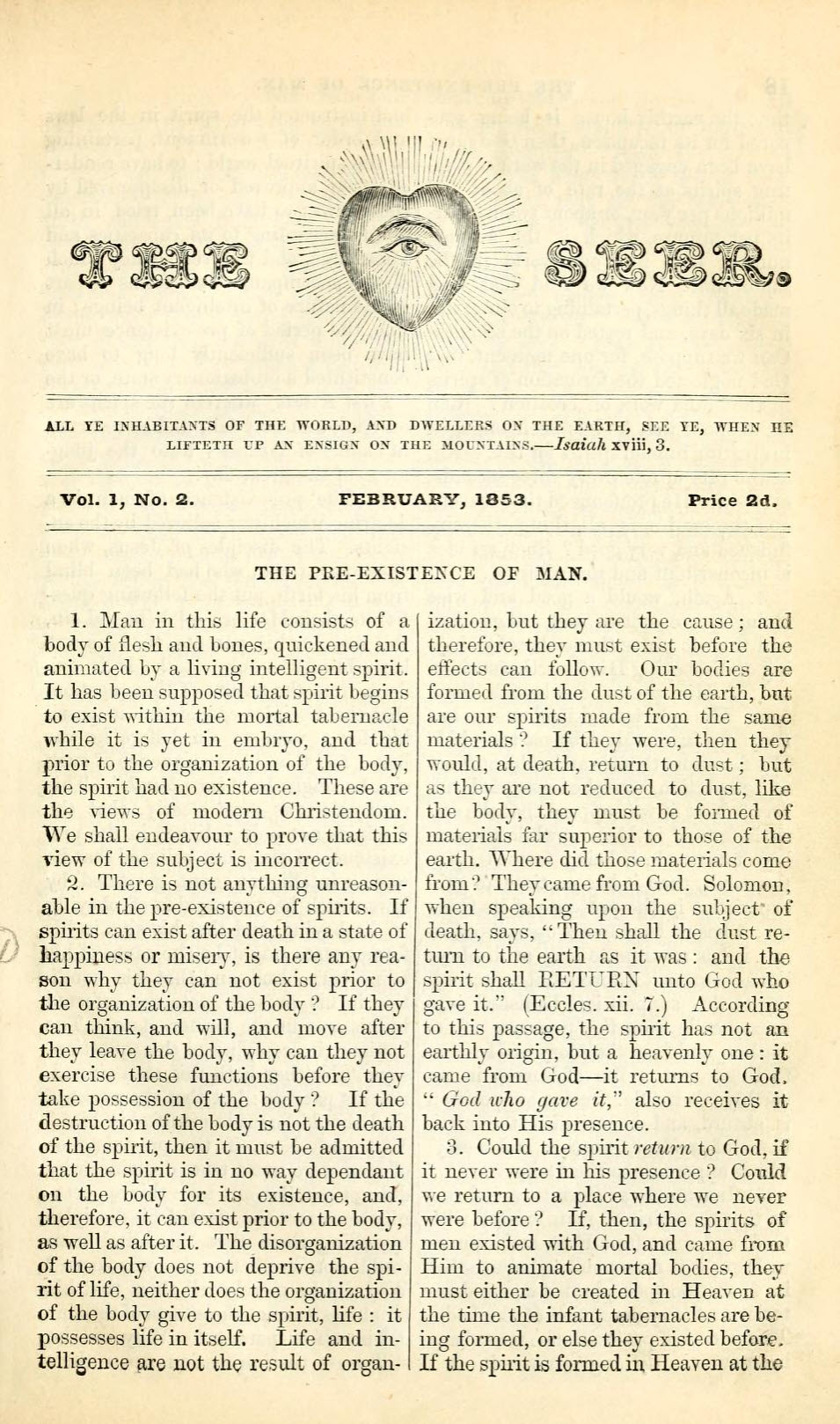
Second issue of The Seer February, 1853, containing a portion of the serial article The Pre-Existence of Man.

The Seer was a periodical authorized for publication by leaders of the Church of Jesus Christ of Latter-day Saints (LDS Church), which ran from January 1853–August 1854, and largely discussed the principle of Celestial (or Plural) Marriage.

The periodical was officially condemned by the First Presidency and the Quorum of the Twelve Apostles in 1865. They provided some examples of teachings they considered to be false (particularly those found in the serial article The Pre-Existence of Man). They then urged the destruction of any existing copies of the entire periodical, because, as they stated, "If [anything else taught in it were] true, we would think it unwise to have them made public as these have been. ... the publication of all of them is unwise and objectionable. They are mere hypotheses, and should be perused and accepted as such; and not as doctrines of the Church."

== History ==
After the LDS Church publicly acknowledged that it was teaching and practicing plural marriage at its September 1852 conference, LDS Church president Brigham Young dispatched apostle Orson Pratt to Washington, D.C., where he was asked to publish an apologetic magazine targeted at non-Mormons. The primary purpose of the magazine would be to explain and defend the principles of Mormonism.

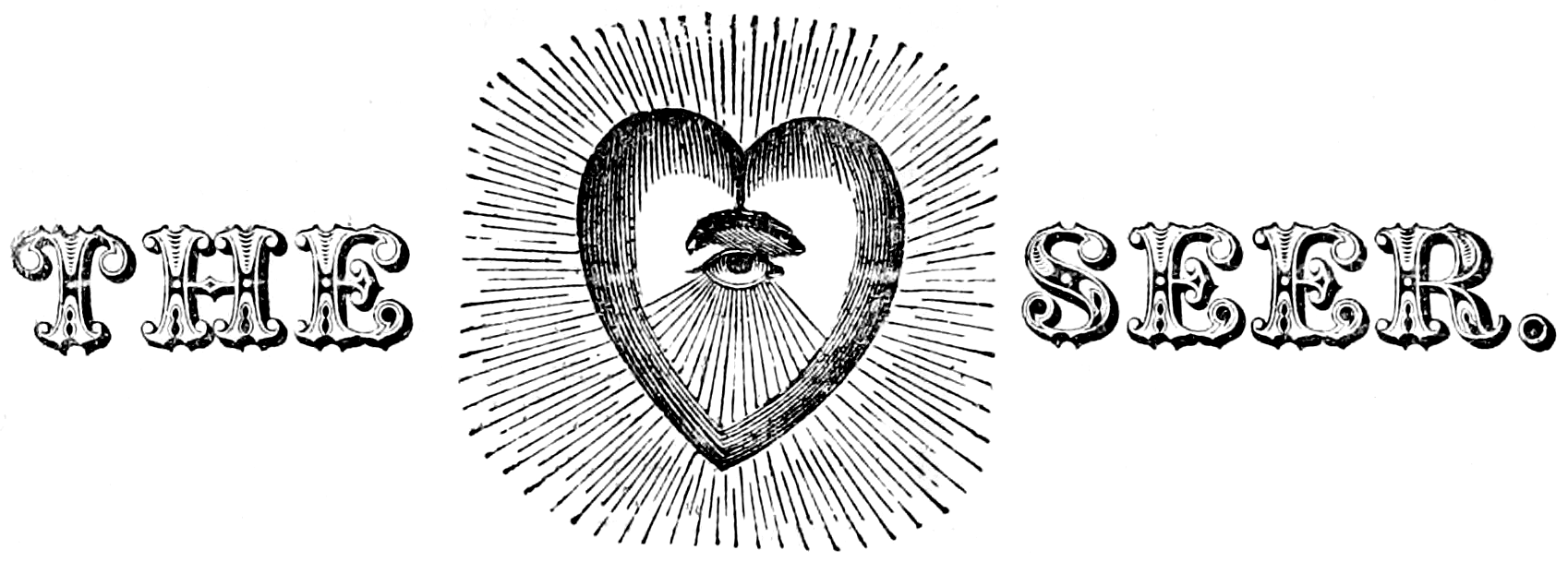
Masthead of The Seer.

The first edition of The Seer was published in January 1853, with future editions being produced monthly. The contents of The Seer were composed almost entirely of original writings by Pratt. Throughout its publication history, the majority of Pratt's writing stressed the rationality of the doctrine of plural marriage. For example, Pratt dedicated 107 of the 192 total pages of The Seer to a twelve-part exposition on what he called celestial marriage.

The Seer was published in Washington, D.C., until July 1854, when publication was shifted to Liverpool, England. After only 18 issues, Pratt was forced to cease publication due to mounting financial losses. Circulation peaked at 400 copies in late 1853. "The world will not subscribe for nor read The Seer," Pratt lamented to his brother Parley.

== Resulting doctrinal controversy ==
In 1865, the First Presidency and the Quorum of the Twelve Apostles (Orson Pratt himself joining the condemnation shortly after) of the LDS Church officially condemned some of Pratt's doctrinal declarations contained in The Seer regarding the nature of the Holy Ghost, the Godhead (the term Latter-day Saints use to refer to the Trinity), and intelligence:

"The Seer [and other writings by Pratt] contain doctrines which we cannot sanction, and which we have felt impressed to disown, so that the Saints who now live, and who may live hereafter, may not be misled by our silence, or be left to misinterpret it. Where these objectionable works, or parts of works, are bound in volumes, or otherwise, they should be cut out and destroyed."

While the majority of the teachings found in The Seer were related to Celestial Marriage, and not to the nature of the Holy Ghost, the entire publication was condemned because the First Presidency and Quorum of the Twelve considered many of the other teachings unwise to be made available for public perusal.

== Legacy ==
Despite the failure of The Seer and the controversy that resulted from some of its contents, many of the traditional explanations and justifications for Mormon polygamy had their beginning in Pratt's writings in the magazine.

In 1879, John Taylor said the following concerning The Seer:

The first thing that was done, when the word of God came to us to do it—for there was a time after this revelation was given when we were not permitted to teach this doctrine publicly; but as soon as we were instructed to do so, Prof. Orson Pratt was sent to Washington to publish a paper, at the seat of government, and there proclaim our sentiments on plural marriage to this nation and to the world. This mission he fulfilled—publishing a paper called the Seer, and lecturing in a hall hired for that purpose, several times a week. Was there anything underhanded about this, or low, or anything antagonistic to the interest of this nation or any other nation? It was merely proclaiming certain principles pertaining to eternal lives and covenants that should exist through eternity, in our sexual relations pertaining to our association in this world and the world to come. Did we interfere with the rights of others? No; and if we had any revelations, it was not for us to oppose them. But others do not know anything about these things, consequently they cannot comprehend our position.—Journal of Discourses, 20:352–354. (November 30, 1879.)

== See also ==
- List of Latter Day Saint periodicals
