= Valeen Tippetts Avery =

American biographer and historian (1936–2006)

- Born: Valeen Tippetts; December 22, 1936; Great Falls, Montana, U.S.
- Died: April 7, 2006 (aged 69); Flagstaff, Arizona, U.S.
- Spouse(s): Charles C. Avery (m. 1961-1986; divorced); Bryan Collier Short (m. 1996)
- Children: 4

Academic background
- Education: Rocky Mountain College

Academic work
- Main interests: Western American and Latter Day Saint history
- Notable works: Mormon Enigma: Emma Hale Smith

Valeen Tippetts Avery (December 22, 1936 – April 7, 2006) was an American biographer and historian of Western American and Latter Day Saint history. With biographer Linda King Newell, she co-authored Mormon Enigma: Emma Hale Smith, a biography of the wife of the founder of the Church of Jesus Christ of Latter-day Saints, Joseph Smith.

== Biography ==
Avery was born in the agricultural and industrial city of Great Falls, Montana. She attended Rocky Mountain College in Billings, and Brigham Young University, in Provo, Utah. She married Charles C. Avery in 1961; the couple had four children, but divorced in 1986. In 1996, Avery married Bryan Collier Short.

Avery attended graduate school at Northern Arizona University during her research for Emma Smith's biography. She earned a master's degree in history in 1981, and her Ph.D. in history in 1984. She served as president of the Mormon History Association between 1987 and 1988. Avery was well known in the western history field for articles, reviews and commentaries. She served as professor of history, with specialties in women's history and Colorado Plateau Studies, at Northern Arizona until her retirement in 2005.

Avery died in Flagstaff, Arizona, aged 69.

== Major biographies ==
Mormon Enigma: Emma Hale Smith was well received by the scholarly community when it was first published in 1984. The biography won the Evans Biography Award, the Mormon History Association Best Book Award, and the John Whitmer Historical Association (RLDS) Best Book Award. Avery and Newell provided the following note in the book's introduction:

Early leaders in Utah castigated Emma from their pulpits for opposing Brigham Young and the practice of polygamy, and for lending support to the Reorganization. As these attitudes filtered down through the years, Emma was virtually written out of official Utah histories. In this biography, we have attempted to reconstruct the full story of this remarkable and much misunderstood woman's experiences.

Despite its quality and recognition, the biography was startling and controversial among leaders, administrators and members of the Church of Jesus Christ of Latter-day Saints. Shortly after publication, Avery and Newell, both participating members in the church, were refused any opportunity to talk about their research or book in church meetings. In the preface to the second edition of the book, the authors write: «After a ten-months stalemate Linda Newell successfully petitioned church leaders to reconsider the prohibition. On April 26, 1986, she was informed that the restrictions ... were no longer in effect.» Yet the fact that the lifting of that ban was not reported by the church-owned newspaper Deseret News led them to say that it «gave the unmistakable message to faithful church members that both the book and its authors were still suspect.»

Avery produced a biography of the life of the youngest son of Joseph and Emma Smith, David Hyrum Smith, From Mission to Madness: Last Son of the Mormon Prophet in 1998. This biography also won the Evans Award for the best biography in Western history. She describes Smith's mental deterioration, starting with a probable breakdown early in 1870 and ending with his 1904 death in the Northern Illinois Hospital and Asylum for the Insane in Elgin, Illinois. He was confined in the institution for twenty-seven years. The book draws on a large body of Smith's correspondence and poetry to examine both his personality and his emotional state.

== Selected publications ==
- "Emma Smith: An Unknown Sister," in Maren M. Mouritsen, ed., Blueprints for Living: Perspectives for Latter-day Saint Women, Volume Two (Provo, UT: Brigham Young University Press, 1980).
- "Emma Smith Through Her Writings" Dialogue: A Journal of Mormon Thought 17 (Autumn 1984).
- From Mission to Madness: Last Son of the Mormon Prophet. University of Illinois Press, October 1998. ISBN 0-252-02399-4.
- "Insanity and the Sweet Singer: A Biography of David Hyrum Smith, 1844-1904" Ph.D. dissertation, Northern Arizona University, 1984.
- "Irreconcilable Differences: David H. Smith's Relationship with the Muse of Mormon History" Journal of Mormon History 15 (1989).
- "Sketches of the Sweet Singer: David Hyrum Smith, 1844-1904" John Whitmer Historical Association Journal 5 (1985).
- "The Last Years of the Prophet's Wife: Emma Hale Smith Bidamon and the Establishment of the Reorganized Church of Jesus Christ of Latter Day Saints" (M.A. thesis, Northern Arizona University, 1981).

With Linda King Newell:

- "Jane Manning James: Black Saint, 1847 Pioneer", Ensign (official publication of the Church of Jesus Christ of Latter-day Saints), Aug. 1979.
- "Lewis C. Bidamon, Stepchild of Mormondom" BYU Studies 19 (Spring 1979).
- Mormon Enigma: Emma Hale Smith, Prophet's Wife, Elect Lady, Polygamy's Foe. Doubleday Publishing, September 1984. ISBN 0-385-17166-8. 2nd edition. rev., Urbana, IL: University of Illinois Press, 1994.
- "New Light on the Sun: Emma Smith and the New York Sun Letter" Journal of Mormon History 6 (1979).
- "Sweet Counsel and Seas of Tribulation: The Religious Life of the Women in Kirtland," BYU Studies 20 (Winter 1980).
- "The Elect Lady: Emma Hale Smith". Ensign, Sept. 1979.
- "The Lion and the Lady: Brigham Young and Emma Smith," Utah Historical Quarterly 48.1 (Winter 1980). Reprinted in Roger D. Launius and John E. Hallwas, eds., Kingdom on the Mississippi Revisited (Urbana: University of Illinois Press, 1996), pp. 198–213.

With Linda King Newell and Maureen Ursenback Beecher:

- "Emma and Eliza and the Stairs" BYU Studies 22 (Winter 1982).

== See also ==
- Brigham Young
- Jane Elizabeth Manning James
- polygamy / plural marriage
- Reorganized Church of Jesus Christ of Latter Day Saints
- The Sun (New York)
