= Nancy Rigdon =

LDS Church figure

Personal details
- Born: Nancy Rigdon; December 8, 1822; Pittsburgh, Pennsylvania, United States
- Died: November 1, 1887 (aged 64)
- Spouse(s): Robert Ellis
- Parents: Sidney Rigdon; Phebe Brooks

Nancy Rigdon (December 8, 1822 – November 1, 1887) was the daughter of Sidney Rigdon, an early leader in the Latter-day Saint Movement. In 1842, she was the recipient of a controversial letter written by Joseph Smith, after she refused his offer of polygamous marriage.

== Biography ==
Nancy was born to Sidney Rigdon and Phebe Brooks on December 8, 1822. She and her parents became early members of the Latter-day Saint Movement. She moved numerous times during her childhood as the Latter-day Saints moved from Kirtland, Ohio to Far West, Missouri, and eventually to Nauvoo, Illinois.

Nancy's brother, John Wickliffe Rigdon, recorded that Joseph Smith proposed polygamous marriage to Nancy in 1842, which she "flatly refused".

A few days later, Smith's personal secretary, Willard Richards, delivered a letter to Nancy. The letter contained statements such as, "That which is wrong under one circumstance, may be, and often is, right under another" and "Whatever God required is right, no matter what it is."

She married Robert Ellis in 1846.

== Polygamy proposal by Joseph Smith ==
In 1842, Joseph Smith locked 19-year-old Nancy in a room, and proposed polygamous marriage. Nancy refused, saying she would "alarm the neighbors" if she was not allowed to leave.

A few days after the encounter, Willard Richards, secretary of Joseph Smith, delivered a letter to Nancy, explaining that "That which is wrong under one circumstance, may be, and often is, right under another." The letter is widely regarded by Church leaders as being written by Joseph Smith, and has been quoted by numerous Church leaders, including in General Conference.

John C. Bennett, who was serving as Assistant President of the Church at the time, recorded:

She [Nancy] went down. Joe was there, and took her into a private room, LOCKED THE DOOR [sic], and commenced by telling her that he had long loved her, and had asked the Lord for her, and that it was his holy will that he should have her ... she said she would alarm the neighbors if he did not open the door, and let her out--he did so, and requested Mrs. Hyde to explain matters to her. Joe swore her to eternal secrecy. Mrs. Hyde told her that these things looked strange to her at first, but she would become more reconciled on mature reflec-tion. Miss Rigdon replied, "I never shall." Joe agreed to write her and did so in a few days thro' Dr. Richards. That letter is now safe in the hands of her friends. I have seen it, so has her father, and various other persons.

Joseph Fielding Smith published a statement from Nancy's brother, John Wickliffe Rigdon, about the encounter:

It happened in this way: Nancy had gone to Church meeting being held in a grove near the temple lot on which the "Mormons" were then erecting a temple, an old lady friend [Marinda Johnson Hyde] who lived alone invited her, which Nancy did. When they got to the house and had taken their bonnets off, the old lady began to talk to her about the new doctrine of polygamy which was then being taught, telling Nancy, during the conversation, that it was a surprise to her when she first heard it, but that she had since come to believe it to be true.

While they were talking Joseph Smith the Prophet came into the house and joined them, and the old lady immediately left the room. It was then that Joseph made the proposal of marriage to my sister. Nancy flatly refused him, saying if she ever got married she would marry a single man or none at all, and thereupon took her bonnet and went home, leaving Joseph at the old lady's home
