= Jacob Cochran =

Preacher in New Hampshire, US

Jacob Cochran (also Cochrane, 1782–1836) was a non-denominational preacher born in Enfield, New Hampshire, United States who founded the Cochranites in Saco, Maine. Cochranite worship is said to have resembled Shakerism, but which also practiced a new doctrine called spiritual wifery. Cochranism may have influenced the Mormon doctrines of plural marriage and the United Order, as well as the free love practice called complex marriage once favored by the Oneida Community.

== Cochranites (aka "The Society of Free Brethren and Sisters") ==
Jacob Cochran was said to have promoted the restoration of the apostolic Christian church, a popular sentiment at that time. He also claimed success in miracle-working and exorcism. Cochran also instituted holy dancing and a frenzy called reaping in which participants are "thrown into the greatest agitations; a violent exertion of the arms and body, for a long time together....To other violent motions of the arms and body, they give the appellation of winnowing, and separating the chaff from the wheat: another they call, gathering and burning the chaff."

Cochran dismissed traditional concepts of marriage, citing passages in the bible where seven wives shared one man. As early as 1818-1819 the group was referring to spiritual wifery. Cochran would assign women to the men since legal marriages were not considered valid. He would also shift these women between men as he saw fit as their prophet. It was said that about half of the women in the group were once assigned to him. Ephraim Stinchfield, who observed the community on a number of occasions, recorded 16 pages of "abominations" including unwed couples staying together, and Cochran's habit of taking young women into private rooms for extended periods of time.

After their meeting was over, I retired and spent the rest of the evening with six of this society, one of whom called himself an ordained minister in their society. I had now for the first time, an opportunity of inquiring into their distinguishing peculiar tenets. They, like all other enthusiasts, pretended to light superior to that of any other religious society, since the Apostles; and the power of healing the sick, raising the dead, and casting out devils -- all of which, they said, had been literally performed among them. Extraordinary dreams and visions, they asserted, had been experienced, and wonders wrought. They had private, sometimes dark, meetings; in which none, but such as were bound by oath, to the most inviolable secrecy, not to divulge what was transacted in the meeting, upon penalty of eternal damnation, or of having their names blotted out of the book of life, were admitted. That each brother and sister in this fraternity, has a spiritual husband, wife, mate, or yoke fellow, such as they choose, or their leaders choose for them. These spiritual mates, dissolve, or disannul, all former marriage connections; and many of them bed and board together, to the exclusion of all former vows. Such conduct as this, had not become general, and many of them would deny that such things existed among them, though proved by the most solemn declarating of persons of undoubted veracity. I had, before I left this place, such a discovery of the mystery of iniquity, working to the subverson of all social ties, between husband and wife, parents and children, rulers and ruled, ministers and people; the rising generation corrupted by the introduction of such vicious practices, under a cloak of religion, that it seemed as if I should be constrained to run from house to house, and cry day and night, against the abomination that maketh desolate.

Cochran also was working towards a communal order where everything was held in common. However, within a few years, Cochran was eventually convicted of gross lewdness, lascivious behavior, and adultery and spent four years in prison. His followers were once said to be in the thousands, but only a handful remained loyal to their prophet after his imprisonment.

A few years after his release from prison, Jacob Cochran established a colony for a portion of his followers, in what is now Grove township, Allegany Co., New York. This little-known group lived in close proximity to several people who later became prominent members within the Latter Day Saint Movement including Warren Cowdery, William Marks and Lyman Wight—the first Mormon branches in Allegany County were established in the area immediately surrounding the Cochranite colony, during the early 1830s.

Cochran has been called a "John the Baptist" for Mormonism by Saco Valley historian G.T. Ridlon because so many Cochranites were among those who converted to Mormonism and moved west, although the actual number of his followers that became Latter-day Saints is not verified and could not be more than a handful. Although the Cochranites practiced a type of "spiritual wifery" (see above) which sanctioned multiple female partners for each man in the group, their doctrines did not include the precept of "eternal marriage" and differed very significantly from the later practice of Mormon polygamy.

Latter Day Saint historical sources indicate that Mormon missionaries were laboring successfully to make converts among Maine's Cochranites as early as 1832: at the Church conference held in Saco, Maine on August 21, 1835, at least seven of the newly ordained apostles were in attendance. John C. Bennett, a leading Mormon who was excommunicated, is credited with introducing the Cochranite term spiritual wifery to Mormonism. Bennett's version of the multiple female partners practice appears to have more closely resembled Jacob Cochran's doctrine than it did the precept of plural marriage among the Latter Day Saints.
