= Linda King Newell =

American historian and author (1941–2023)

- Born: January 16, 1941
- Died: February 12, 2023 (aged 82)
- Occupations: Historian, author, editor, scholar
- Spouse: L. Jackson Newell

Academic work
- Main interests: History of Mormonism
- Notable works: Mormon Enigma: Emma Hale Smith

Linda King Newell (January 16, 1941 – February 12, 2023) was an American historian and author.

Newell co-authored the 1984 book entitled, Mormon Enigma: Emma Hale Smith, with Valeen Tippetts Avery. During this time (1982–86) she was editor of the scholarly Mormon periodical entitled, Dialogue: A Journal of Mormon Thought, with her husband L. Jackson Newell, a professor at the University of Utah, who also would serve as president of Deep Springs College.

== Early life and education ==
Linda King was born on January 16, 1941, to Foisy Earl King and Pearl King in Richfield, Utah. She grew up in Fillmore, Utah, and attended the Southern Utah University, studying art and education on a scholarship. She graduated in 1963. Newell married her husband, L. Jackson, in 1963 and they had three children together.

== Mormon studies ==
While Newell did not have formal training as a historian, she achieved prominence for her work in Mormon studies. Mormon Enigma, her biography of Emma Smith received the interpretive history prize from the Mormon History Association. This and her other articles examining how women's power in the Church of Jesus Christ of Latter-day Saints (LDS Church) diminished after the 1950s caused her to be blacklisted by Mormon leaders. She was not allowed to speak about Mormon history at LDS Church events or meetinghouses, and her work was not allowed to be cited in church-published material.

== Professional positions ==
Newell served as president of the John Whitmer Historical Association in 1988 and the Mormon History Association from 1996 to 1997. Recognized as a scholar in the field of feminism, her work gained acclaim.

== Death ==
She died on February 12, 2023, at the age of 82.

== Publications ==
- Mormon Enigma: Emma Hale Smith, Prophet's Wife, Elect Lady, Polygamy's Foe. Doubleday Publishing, September 1984. ISBN 0-385-17166-8.
- The Historical Relationship of Mormon Woman and Priesthood, In: Maxine Hanks ed. Women and Authority, 1992, pp. 23 – 48.

== Notes ==
- Anderson, Devery S. (Summer 2002), "A History of Dialogue, Part Three: The Utah Experience, 1982-1989", Dialogue: A Journal of Mormon Thought, 35 (2): 1–71, doi:10.2307/45226850, JSTOR 45226850, S2CID 254342260, archived from the original on 2011-06-14. Discusses the religious controversy following Mormon Enigma's initial publication in 1984 (page 40 to 48).
- Groundbreaking Emma Smith biographer, a ‘giant’ in Mormon scholarship, dies at 82 https://www.sltrib.com/religion/2023/02/17/groundbreaking-emma-smith/
