= Levi W. Hancock =

American religious figure (1803–1882)

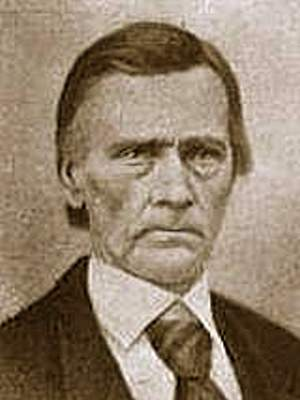

First Seven Presidents of the Seventy
- September 3, 1837 – June 10, 1882
- Called by: Joseph Smith

First Seven Presidents of the Seventy
- March 1, 1835 – April 6, 1837
- Called by: Joseph Smith
- End reason: Honorably released because it was mistakenly thought he had been previously ordained a high priest

Personal details
- Born: Levi Ward Hancock; April 7, 1803; Springfield, Massachusetts, United States
- Died: June 10, 1882 (aged 79); Washington, Utah Territory, United States
- Resting place: Washington City Cemetery; 37.132°N 113.503°W
- Spouse(s): Elizabeth W. Hovey; Emily M. Richey; Clarissa Reed; Anna Tew; Mary Morgan (Maren)
- Children: 18
- Parents: Thomas Hancock III; Amy Ward

Levi Ward Hancock (April 7, 1803 – June 10, 1882) was an early convert to Mormonism and was a general authority of the Church of Jesus Christ of Latter-day Saints for nearly fifty years. He was also one of the witnesses of the Book of Commandments.

== Biography ==
Hancock was born in Springfield, Massachusetts to Thomas Hancock III and Amy Ward. In 1830, while living in Ohio, Hancock heard Latter Day Saint missionaries Parley P. Pratt, Sidney Rigdon, and Oliver Cowdery preaching in Mayfield. Convinced by their words, Hancock was baptized in the Latter Day Saint church on November 16, 1830. He married Clarissa Reed on March 20, 1831. He was then ordained an elder by Cowdery and, in 1831, served a proselyting mission to Missouri with Zebedee Coltrin. He also preached in Indiana and Illinois. Hancock was called on another mission in January 1832, this time to Ohio and Virginia. After returning to Kirtland, he was present for the founding of the School of the Prophets in January 1833.

In 1834 Hancock participated in Zion's Camp, traveling from Ohio to Missouri in an effort to assist Church members who were experiencing trouble there. On February 28, 1835, Hancock was ordained a seventy in the Church and was selected as one of the first seven presidents of the Seventy. On April 6, 1837, Hancock was released from this position because it was mistakenly believed that he, like five of the other presidents of the Seventy, had already been ordained a high priest. When it was discovered that this was not the case, Hancock was restored to his position on September 3, 1837. He served as a Seventy for 47 years. Following the death of Joseph Young, Hancock was the senior president of the Seventy from July 1881 until his own death in June 1882.

Hancock wrote the words to several songs. His "My Peaceful Home, 1837" captures the feelings of Latter-day Saints about their new homes in the communities they had set up. Hancock wrote the words of the twelve verse-song sung at the placing of the Far West Temple cornerstones in 1838.

Hancock followed the Latter Day Saints as they moved to Missouri, and then to Nauvoo, Illinois. He was a member of the Nauvoo Legion and the Nauvoo police force. In 1843 Hancock was made the chief musician in the Nauvoo Legion.

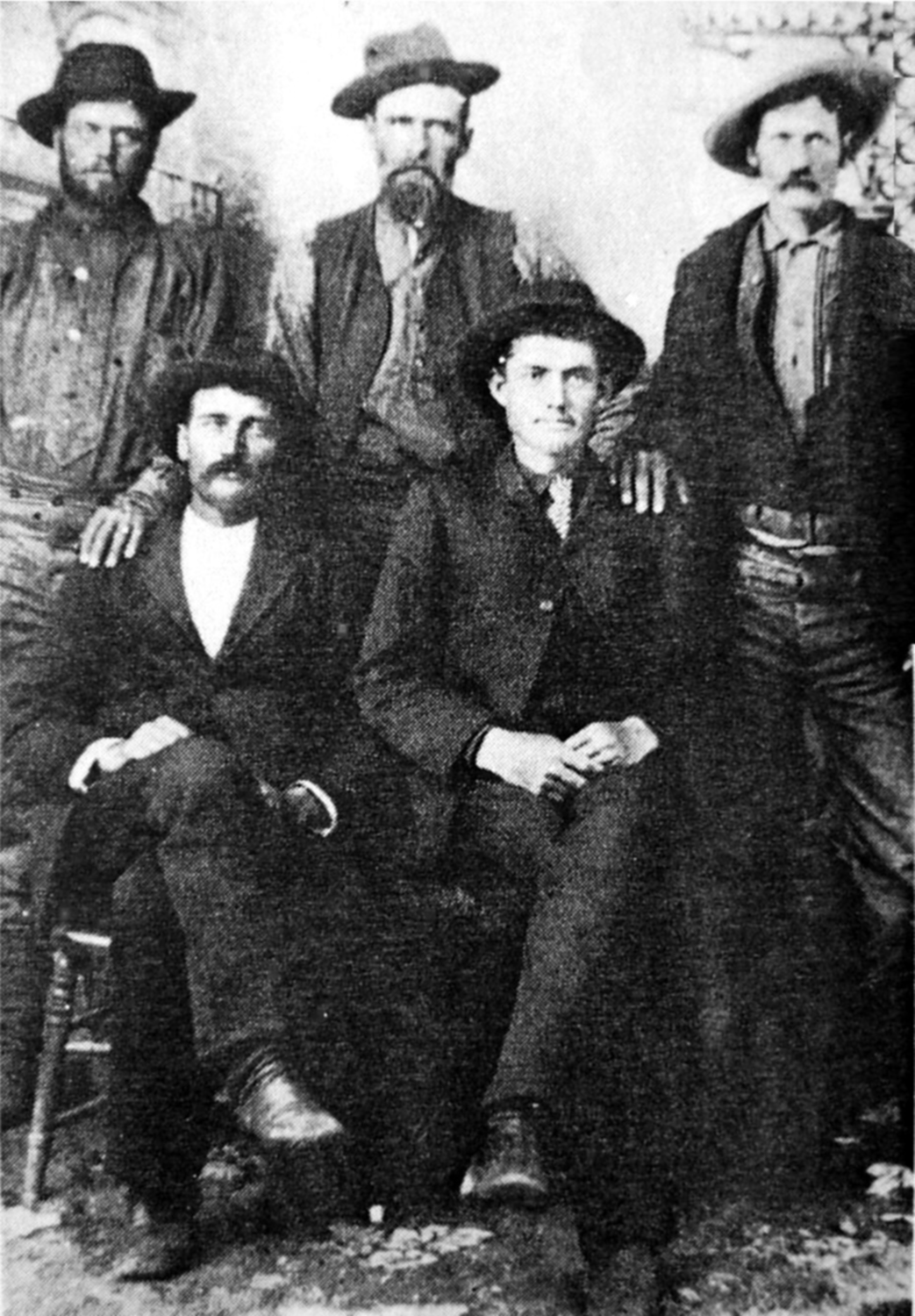
1890 c. Ether, Levi, Levison, Solomon and Samuel Hancock

Hancock was one of the Church members in Missouri that sustained the truth of the Book of Commandments. He signed the testimony with a pencil and he also added the text "never to be erased", when "he saw that the others had signed with a pen." Because of the circumstances when the book was printed, the document was not included in the printing.

In 1844 Hancock became a member of the Council of Fifty, and in 1846 joined the Mormon Battalion. On 16 July 1847, he was mustered out of the Army at Pueblo Los Angeles with the majority of the Battalion. Traveling east along the California Trail, Hancock led about 100 men to Utah where they joined the Mormon pioneers in the Salt Lake Valley on 18 October. In Utah Territory, he became a member of the Utah Territorial Legislature. He served a full-time mission for the Church attempting to grow cotton in southern Utah. Hancock helped settle Manti, Utah; Payson, Utah; Harrisburg, Utah; Leeds, Utah; and Washington, Utah. He was ordained a church patriarch in 1872. He died in Washington, Utah on June 10, 1882, at the age of 79.

Like many early Latter Day Saints, Hancock practiced plural marriage. Hancock was married to five wives, three of whom eventually divorced him; he was the father of 18 children.

== See also ==
- Nauvoo Brass Band
- Mosiah Hancock
