= Richard S. Van Wagoner =

Richard Van Wagoner
- Born: July 23, 1946; Lehi, Utah, U.S.
- Died: October 10, 2010 (aged 64); Lehi, Utah, U.S.

Academic background
- Education: Brigham Young University (MS)

Academic work
- Discipline: Audiology; History
- Sub-discipline: History of The Church of Jesus Christ of Latter-day Saints

Richard S. Van Wagoner (July 23, 1946 – October 10, 2010) was an American historian, audiologist, and author who published works on the history of Utah and the history of the Latter Day Saint movement.

== Early life and education ==
Van Wagoner was a Lehi, Utah, native and a fifth-generation Mormon. He was an Eagle Scout and was a missionary for the Church of Jesus Christ of Latter-day Saints in the church's Central States Mission. In 1970, he graduated from Brigham Young University with an M.S. degree.

== Career ==
Trained as a clinical audiologist, he began professional practice in 1977 in Salt Lake City, Utah.

Van Wagoner wrote the books Sidney Rigdon: A Portrait of Religious Excess and Mormon Polygamy: A History. His 1994 biography of Sidney Rigdon won awards from the Mormon History Association and the John Whitmer Historical Association.

Van Wagoner was a member of the board of Signature Books, and was described after his death as a "trailblazer in Mormon studies", having published historical articles in Utah Historical Quarterly, Dialogue: A Journal of Mormon Thought, and Sunstone. He lived in Lehi, Utah, and acted as the town's historical archivist.

== Personal life ==
From the early 1980s, Van Wagoner lost his hearing due to otosclerosis; he received a cochlear implant in 2001, which partially restored his hearing.

Van Wagoner died unexpectedly at his home in Lehi, Utah, at age 64.

== Works ==
Books

- Van Wagoner, Richard S.; Steven C. Walker (1982), A Book of Mormons, Midvale, Utah: Signature Books, ISBN 978-0-941214-06-3
- —— (1989) [1986], Mormon Polygamy: A History (2nd ed.), Salt Lake City, Utah: Signature Books, ISBN 978-0-941214-79-7, LCCN 85063399, OCLC 19515803, archived from the original on 2014-10-30
- —— (1990), Lehi: Portraits of a Utah Town, Lehi, Utah: Lehi City Corp., ISBN 978-1-56085-001-4
- —— (1994), Sidney Rigdon: A Portrait of Religious Excess, Salt Lake City, Utah: Signature Books, ISBN 978-1-56085-197-4
- —— (2001), Pioneering Lehi City: A 150-Year Pictorial History, Lehi, Utah: Lehi City Corp., ISBN 978-0-9714191-0-0
- Young, Brigham (2009), Richard Van Wagoner (ed.), The Complete Discourses of Brigham Young, vol. 5, Smith-Pettit Foundation, ISBN 978-1-56085-206-3

Articles

- Van Wagoner, Richard; Steven C. Walker (July–August 1981), "The Return of Thomas B. Marsh" (PDF), Sunstone (28): 28–30
- ——; Walker, Steven C. (Summer 1982), "Joseph Smith: The Gift of Seeing", Dialogue: A Journal of Mormon Thought, 15 (2): 48–68, doi:10.2307/45225078, JSTOR 45225078, S2CID 254395171
- —— (November–December 1983), "To Beard or Not to Beard" (PDF), Sunstone (42): 8–10
- —— (Fall 1985), "Mormon Polyandry in Nauvoo", Dialogue: A Journal of Mormon Thought, 18 (3): 67–83, doi:10.2307/45227986, JSTOR 45227986, S2CID 254343203
- —— (Summer 1986), "Sarah Pratt: The Shaping of an Apostate", Dialogue: A Journal of Mormon Thought, 19 (2): 69–99, doi:10.2307/45225431, JSTOR 45225431, S2CID 254299794
- ——; Steven C. Walker; Allen D. Roberts (Fall 1987), "The 'Lectures on Faith': A Case Study in Decanonization", Dialogue: A Journal of Mormon Thought, 20 (3): 71–77, doi:10.2307/45225561, JSTOR 45225561, S2CID 254325099
- ——; Mary C. Van Wagoner (Spring 1988), "Orson Pratt, Jr.: Gifted Son of an Apostle and an Apostate", Dialogue: A Journal of Mormon Thought, 21 (1): 84–94, doi:10.2307/45225710, JSTOR 45225710, S2CID 254324243
- —— (Spring 1991), "The Lehi Sugar Factory—100 Years in Retrospect", Utah Historical Quarterly, 59 (2): 189–204, doi:10.2307/45061979, JSTOR 45061979, S2CID 254430466, archived from the original on 2011-06-13
- —— (1994), "Lehi", in Powell, Allan Kent (ed.), Utah History Encyclopedia, Salt Lake City, Utah: University of Utah Press, ISBN 0874804256, OCLC 30473917, archived from the original on 2013-11-02
- —— (1996), "Sidney and Me", Journal of Mormon History, 22 (1, 2): 151
- —— (Spring–Summer 2001), "The Making of a Mormon Myth: The 1844 Transfiguration of Brigham Young", Dialogue: A Journal of Mormon Thought, 34 (1, 2): 159–182, doi:10.2307/45226773, JSTOR 45226773, S2CID 254319448

Sunstone Symposium presentations

- Van Wagoner, Richard; Allen D. Roberts (August 27, 1982). "From Grace to Grace"
- Bradley, Martha; Richard Van Wagoner (August 23, 1985). "Changed Faces: Official LDS Positions on Polygamy, 1890-1-80"
- Van Wagoner, Richard S.; Lynne Watkins Jorgensen (August 12, 1995). "The Making of a Mormon Myth: The 1844 Transfiguration of Brigham Young - and - The Mantle of the Prophet Joseph Passes to Brother Brigham and the Twelve Apostles: A Collective Spiritual Witness"
- Van Wagoner, Richard S. (August 17, 1996). "Sidney Rigdon and the Elect Sisterhood"
- Ehat, Andrew E.; Richard S. Van Wagoner (August 22, 1996). "Pseudo-Polyandry: Explaining Mormon Polgyny's Paraboxical Companion"
- Van Wagoner, Richard; Breck England (August 23, 1996). "Orson Pratt, Jr"
