= Becky L. Savage =

American leader in Community of Christ

Becky Lee Savage is an American leader in Community of Christ. She was a counselor to Stephen M. Veazey in the First Presidency of the church from 2007 to 2016. Savage was the first female member of the First Presidency in the history of Community of Christ.

Savage was nominated as a counselor by Veazey on March 1, 2007. Savage's appointment was approved by the membership of the church at a World Conference of the church held March 24–31, 2007 in Independence, Missouri. In 2016, she was released from the First Presidency and was ordained an evangelist on June 6, 2016.

Savage was born in Guatemala and has been a professor of nursing at Graceland University in Lamoni, Iowa. She has degrees from Graceland University and the University of Kansas.

Community of Christ opened its priesthood to women in 1984 when a document instituting the ordination of women was approved as Section 156 of the church's Doctrine and Covenants.

== Notes ==
Community of Christ titles
Preceded by Kenneth N. Robinson	Counselor in the First Presidency; March 1, 2007 – 2016	Succeeded by Stassi D. Cramm
