= Patriarch (Latter Day Saints) =

Office in the Latter Day Saint movement

In the Latter Day Saint movement, patriarch (also called evangelist) is an office of the priesthood. It is considered to be either an office of the patriarchal priesthood or the Melchizedek priesthood.

== Latter Day Saint movement ==
In the early days of the Church of Christ and the Latter Day Saint movement, a single patriarch, known as the Presiding Patriarch or Patriarch to the Church, exercised his office throughout the whole church. The first patriarch was Joseph Smith Sr.; after his death, his oldest living son Hyrum became the patriarch. Some Latter Day Saint denominations continue the practice of a single Presiding Patriarch, who in some cases holds the highest office of the church organization; others have multiple patriarchs who hold more general positions in the organization.

== Patriarch in The Church of Jesus Christ of Latter-day Saints ==
While the Church of Jesus Christ of Latter-day Saints (LDS Church) originally continued to have a single church-wide position of "Presiding Patriarch", this practice was discontinued on October 4, 1979. Within the LDS Church today, patriarch is an office in the Melchizedek priesthood.

A patriarch is ordained and called to serve the members of a particular stake organization. He is recommended by the stake presidency, with each recommendation approved by the Quorum of the Twelve Apostles. The selected man must be married, hold the Melchizedek priesthood, have received a patriarchal blessing, and normally be at least 55 years old. He must be ordained to the office of patriarch by the laying on of hands by an apostle or by the stake president (when authorized by the Quorum of the Twelve Apostles). Patriarchs are also set apart to serve in a particular stake. A patriarch retains the priesthood office of patriarch for life. Prior to ordination, the proposed ordination of a patriarch must be approved by the common consent of the priesthood holders (or alternatively, the entire membership) in the stake.

A patriarch's primary responsibility is to give patriarchal blessings to members in his stake. He also has the authority to give such blessings to all of his descendants, regardless of what stake they live in. Unlike other priesthood blessings, patriarchal blessings are recorded and archived at LDS Church headquarters. Under ordinary circumstances, a member will receive only one such blessing in his or her lifetime.

Up until the beginning of the 20th century, patriarchs were compensated for their time either by charging for blessing or, later, receiving a stipend from the church headquarters. The practice of charging for blessings was put to an end when it came to the attention of the church leadership that patriarchs were traveling door to door and "underbidding each other in the price of blessings."

There was a tradition among church members that a blessing for health was more potent if it was received from an ordained patriarch. In the 1940s, the church issued an instruction that such blessings were not to be seen as being any different than those received from any other priesthood holder.

Local stake patriarchs may be designated as "non-functioning" if he is incapacitated by age or illness, leaves to serve as a full-time missionary, moves from the stake, is absent from his home for other reasons, or is approved to be called to another position of church administration. (Church leaders must make advance requests to the First Presidency and Quorum of the Twelve in order to call a functioning patriarch as a bishop, stake president, or high councilor, but such requests are "rarely approved".) In such circumstances, the patriarch is relieved from his responsibilities of giving patriarchal blessings, but he is not formally released and will be able to function as a patriarch again if approved to do so. If a patriarch who has previously been designated as non-functioning is made functional again, he does not have to be re-ordained since he has retained the priesthood office.

=== Patriarch emeritus ===
The priesthood calling patriarch emeritus was created in October 1979, when the Patriarch to the Church, Eldred G. Smith, was released from active duties and designated as an emeritus general authority. Smith was the only Presiding Patriarch in LDS Church history to have been designated patriarch emeritus.

=== Fathers as patriarchs ===
The LDS Church teaches that a father should be a (non-ordained) patriarch in his household, meaning that it is his duty to preside within his own family in providing for the basic physical, emotional, and spiritual needs of all family members. This does not always hold true when the father is not a member of the church. Accordingly, it is proper for priesthood representatives who are visiting a home to defer to him. If he is worthy and holds the proper priesthood authority, it is likewise customary for the church to invite or allow him to officiate in priesthood ordinances for his own family, including giving his children "father's blessings", which are similar to patriarchal blessings. Such blessings may be recorded like patriarchal blessings, but are not forwarded to the LDS Church archives.

== Patriarch in the Community of Christ ==
In the Community of Christ, which was formerly known as the Reorganized Church of Jesus Christ of Latter Day Saints, an evangelist is an office in the Melchizedec Order of the priesthood. Previous to the 1980s, Evangelists were known both as Patriarchs and Evangelists. The name "Patriarch" was dropped when women were first ordained to this office.

The Community of Christ originally retained the single church wide position of "Presiding Patriarch or "Presiding Evangelist". In 1835 the Community of Christ allowed for the calling of "Patriarch-Evangelist" within large branches of the church. However, it wasn't until after the 1894 General Conference that was generally practiced.

Calls to the office of evangelist originate from members the Council of Twelve Apostles following consultation with the Presiding Evangelist. They are approved by the Council of Twelve Apostles and the First Presidency, and vote is taken by either the World Conference or by a Mission Center conference to sustain and approve that call. All evangelists belong to the Order of Evangelists, which is directed by the Presiding Evangelist.
