= F. Henry Edwards =

British leader

Francis Henry Edwards

Personal life
- Born: 4 August 1897 Birmingham, England
- Died: 1 December 1991 (aged 94)
- Education: Graceland University; University of Kansas; University of Missouri–Kansas City
- Occupation: Religious leader, author, historian

Religious life
- Religion: Latter Day Saint movement
- Denomination: RLDS Church; Community of Christ
- Church: RLDS Church

Francis Henry Edwards (4 August 1897 – 1 December 1991) was a British leader in the Reorganized Church of Jesus Christ of Latter Day Saints (RLDS Church). Edwards was an apostle and a member of the church's Council of Twelve Apostles from 1922 to 1946 and was a member of the First Presidency from 1946 to 1966.

== Early life and imprisonment ==
Edwards was born to a Latter Day Saint family in Birmingham, England. During the First World War Edwards, as a conscientious objector, refused to serve in the British military when conscripted. Having been denied recognition by his local Military Service Tribunal, he was arrested, brought before a magistrates' court and handed over to the army. At a court-martial in Worcester on 21 December 1916 he was sentenced to 112 days imprisonment with hard labour, which he served in Wormwood Scrubs. On 30 January 1917 he was interviewed by the Central Tribunal, sitting in the prison, who found him to be a "genuine" conscientious objector, after all, and offered him admission to the Home Office Scheme, whereby conscientious objector prisoners could be released on condition of performing civilian work under civilian control. Edwards was transferred to Princetown Work Centre, set up in the erstwhile Dartmoor Prison, where he remained until the Scheme was wound up in April 1919.

== RLDS Church leadership ==
Edwards immigrated to the United States to join the main gathering of RLDS Church members in Iowa and became a full-time missionary in 1920. On 13 October 1922, RLDS Church president Frederick M. Smith selected Edwards as an apostle of the church. Upon joining the Council of Twelve Apostles, he was selected as the organization's secretary.

Frederick Smith died in 1946 and his brother Israel A. Smith was selected to succeed him. Israel Smith chose John F. Garver and Edwards as his counselors in the First Presidency. When Smith died in 1958 and was succeeded by his younger brother W. Wallace Smith, Edwards was retained as a member of the First Presidency. On 18 April 1966, Edwards was honorably released from membership in the First Presidency and replaced by Duane E. Couey. At this time, Edwards was officially encouraged to "pursu[e] his talents of writing and teaching".

== Author and editor ==
In 1938, Edwards published the first edition of his Commentary on the Doctrine and Covenants, a resource that was updated and republished throughout Edwards's life and is still used today in the Community of Christ in studies of the church's Doctrine and Covenants. From 1967 to 1976, Edwards updated the History of the Reorganized Church of Jesus Christ of Latter Day Saints to include material from 1896 to 1976, which comprises volumes 5 through 8 of the work.

== Family and personal life ==
On 27 June 1924, Edwards married Alice Smith, a daughter of RLDS Church president Frederick M. Smith. In 1938, Edwards became a citizen of the United States. Edwards attended Graceland University, the University of Kansas and the University of Missouri–Kansas City. Today at Graceland University, there is a F. Henry Edwards Chair of Religious Studies.

== Publications ==
- F. Henry Edwards (1932). A Study of the Doctrine and Covenants (Independence, Mo.: Herald House)
- —— (1933). Life and Ministry of Jesus (Independence, Mo.: Herald House)
- —— (1936). Fundamentals: Enduring Convictions of the Restoration (Independence, Mo.: Herald House) [Second Edition published in 1948]
- —— (1938). A Commentary on the Doctrine and Covenants: A Brief Historical Treatment of Each Section, Stating the Conditions under which It Was Given, Its Import for the Time It Was Given, and Its Application to the Problems and Needs of the Church Today (Independence, Mo.: Herald House) [reprinted and revised in 1986 as ISBN 0-8309-0187-6]
- —— (1940). Missionary Sermon Studies (Independence, Mo.: Herald House)
- —— (1943). God Our Help (Independence, Mo.: Herald House)
- —— (1950). Studies in the Life and Ministry of Jesus (Independence, Mo.: Herald House)
- Elbert A. Smith, F. Henry Edwards, and Herbert M. Scott (eds., 1951). Compendium of the Scriptures Including Texts of the Standard Books of the Church (Independence, Mo.: Herald House)
- F. Henry Edwards (1951). Overviews of Church History (Independence, Mo.: Herald House)
- —— (1953). Challenges of the Restoration (Independence, Mo.: Herald House)
- —— (1956). Authority and Spiritual Power (Independence, Mo.: Herald House)
- —— (1959). The Whole Wide World (Independence, Mo.: Herald House)
- —— (1962). All Thy Mercies (Independence, Mo.: Herald House)
- —— (1963). For Such a Time (Independence, Mo.: Herald House)
- —— (1965). The Divine Purpose in Us (Independence, Mo.: Herald House)
- —— (1975). The Joy in Creation and Judgment (Independence, Mo.: Herald House)
- —— (1980). Meditation and Prayer (Independence, Mo.: Herald House)
- —— (1987). The Power that Worketh in Us (Independence, Mo.: Herald House)

Community of Christ titles
Preceded by Israel A. Smith; Lemuel F.P. Curry	Counselor in the First Presidency; April 9, 1946–April 18, 1966	Succeeded by Duane E. Couey
