= Elbert A. Smith =

American leader in the Reorganized Church of Jesus Christ of Latter Day Saints

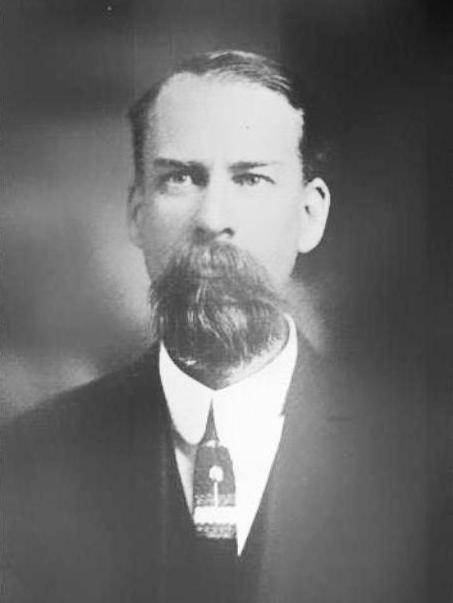
- Photo of Elbert A. Smith ca. 1915

Presiding Patriarch
- 10 April 1938 – 4 February 1958
- Called by: Frederick M. Smith
- Predecessor: Frederick A. Smith
- Successor: Roy A. Cheville

Counselor in the First Presidency
- 19 April 1909 – 7 April 1938
- Called by: Joseph Smith III
- Predecessor: R. C. Evans
- Successor: Israel A. Smith; Lemuel F.P. Curry

Personal details
- Born: Elbert Aoriul Smith; 8 March 1871; Nauvoo, Illinois, United States
- Died: 15 May 1959 (aged 88); Independence, Missouri, United States
- Resting place: Mound Grove Cemetery; 39.113°N 94.428°W
- Spouse(s): Clara A. Cochran
- Children: 3
- Parents: David Hyrum Smith; Clara C. Smith

Elbert Aoriul Smith (8 March 1871 – 15 May 1959) was an American leader in the Reorganized Church of Jesus Christ of Latter Day Saints (RLDS Church). He was a member of the church's First Presidency from 1909 to 1938 and the Presiding Patriarch of the church from 1938 to 1958.

== RLDS Church leadership ==
Smith was born in Nauvoo, Illinois, the son of David Hyrum Smith and the grandson of Joseph Smith, Jr., the founder of the Latter Day Saint movement. In 1900, Elbert Smith became a full-time missionary of the RLDS Church.

On 18 April 1909, Smith's uncle Joseph Smith III, who was the president of the RLDS Church, asked him to become one of his counselors in the church's First Presidency. Smith replaced R. C. Evans, who had moved to Canada and been given jurisdiction over the church there.

When Smith's cousin Frederick M. Smith succeeded Joseph Smith III as president of the church, Elbert Smith was retained in the First Presidency as a counselor. Smith moved to Independence, Missouri, after the church made the decision to move its headquarters there from Lamoni, Iowa. Smith remained as a member of the First Presidency until 7 April 1938, when Frederick Smith designated him as the Presiding Patriarch of the church. In 1946, Smith presented a revelation to a World Conference of the church in which he stated that God had selected Israel A. Smith to succeed Frederick Smith, who had recently died.

Smith remained in as Presiding Patriarch of the church until his resignation in 1958 for health reasons, when he was replaced by Roy Cheville.

== Author and editor ==
Smith was a prolific author of books and tracts about the history of the Latter Day Saint movement and the RLDS Church and about church organization and procedure. For many years he was also the editor of Saints' Herald, the official periodical of the RLDS Church. Among Smith's most well-known works is Restoration: A Study in Prophecy and Differences that Persist Between the Reorganized Church of Jesus Christ of Latter Day Saints and the Utah Mormon Church.

== Family and death ==
Smith married Clara Abigail Cochran in Lamoni, Iowa on 4 September 1895. They were the parents of three boys, two of whom survived to adulthood. Smith died at Independence, Missouri, at the age of 88.

== Publications ==
- Elbert A. Smith (1908). An Instrument in His Hand (Independence Mo.: Herald House)
- —— (1908). The Minister who was Different (Independence Mo.: Herald House)
- —— and David H. Smith (1911). Hesperis, or, Poems By Father and Son (Independence Mo.: Herald House)
- Elbert A. Smith (1911). The Church in Court (Independence Mo.: Herald House)
- —— (1913). A Plea for the Golden Rule (Independence Mo.: Herald House)
- —— (1913). Duties of Branch Officers Independence Mo.: Herald House)
- —— (1916). Joe Pine Independence Mo.: Herald House)
- —— (1920). Corner Stones of the Utah Church (Independence Mo.: Herald House)
- —— (1920). Square Blocks and Other Sermons and Articles (Independence Mo.: Herald House)
- —— (1922). Timbers for the Temple;: A Story of Old Nauvoo in Days of her Glory (Independence Mo.: Herald House)
- —— (1924). The True Philosophy of Church Government (Independence Mo.: Herald House)
- —— (1925). In the Beginning God Created: And 3 Other Radio Sermons (Independence, Mo.: RLDS Church)
- —— (1927). What Latter Day Saints believe about God (Independence Mo.: Herald House)
- —— (1930). Utah Mormon Polygamy. Its Belief and Practice (Independence Mo.: Herald House)
- —— (1935). Church Court Procedure: With Suggested Forms to be Used when Preparing and Hearing Cases (Independence Mo.: RLDS Church)
- —— (1941). Faith of our Fathers Living Still (Independence Mo.: Herald House)
- —— (1941). What Latter Day Saints Believe about Marriage and the Home: With Chapters on the Divorce Problem (Independence Mo.: Herald House)
- —— (1943) Differences that Persist Between the Reorganized Church of Jesus Christ of Latter Day Saints and the Utah Mormon Church (Independence Mo.: Herald House) [reprinted by Kessinger Publishing in 2004, ISBN 1-4179-7574-1]
- —— (1943). Exploring the Church (Independence Mo.: Herald House)
- —— (1946). On Memory's Beam: The Autobiography of Elbert A. Smith (Independence Mo.: Herald House) [re-published in a 1959 revised edition as Brother Elbert]
- —— (1946). Restoration: A Study in Prohecy (Independence Mo.: Herald House)
- —— (1948). Prophetic Warnings in Modern Revelations (Independence Mo.: Herald House)
- —— (1950). Evangelists and Patriarchs;: Their Work and Calling (Independence Mo.: Herald House)
- —— (1950). Zion Builders' Sermons;: A Series of Doctrinal Sermons Addressed to the Young People of the Church (Independence Mo.: Herald House)
- ——, F. Henry Edwards and Herbert M. Scott (eds., 1951). Compendium of the Scriptures Including Texts of the Standard Books of the Church (ndependence Mo.: Herald House)
- Elbert A. Smith (1951). Blue Pencil Notes (Independence Mo.: Herald House)

== Notes ==
Reorganized Church of Jesus Christ of Latter Day Saints titles (Community of Christ)
Preceded by Frederick A. Smith	Presiding Patriarch; April 10, 1938 – February 4, 1958	Succeeded by Roy A. Cheville
Preceded by R. C. Evans	Counselor in the First Presidency; April 19, 1909–April 7, 1938	Succeeded by Israel A. Smith; Lemuel F.P. Curry
