= Peter A. Judd =

British Mormon leader

Peter A. Judd was a member of the First Presidency of the Community of Christ from 2000 to 2005. Judd was also an apostle and a member of the Council of Twelve Apostles of the church from 1996 to 2000.

Judd, a native of Enfield, England, became a counselor to W. Grant McMurray, the seventh prophet–president of the Reorganized Church of Jesus Christ of Latter Day Saints (RLDS Church), in 2000, when Howard S. Sheehy Jr. retired. (The RLDS Church changed its name to Community of Christ in 2001). When McMurray resigned in 2005, Judd and fellow counselor Kenneth N. Robinson led the church until Stephen M. Veazey was selected as the new president. Veazey selected Robinson and David D. Schaal as his counselors in the First Presidency.

Judd is the author of several books and articles about the Community of Christ and its beliefs. He has degrees from Graceland University, the University of Kansas, and the Saint Paul School of Theology.

== Publications ==
- Peter A. Judd and W. Grant McMurray (2004). Journey in Trust : A Study Resource Exploring Doctrine and Covenants, Section 161 (Independence, Mo.: Herald House) ISBN 0-8309-1122-7
- Peter A. Judd (1995). Worship in a Diverse Culture (Independence, Mo.: Herald House) ISBN 0-8309-0706-8
- —— (1992). The Sacraments : An Exploration into Their Meaning and Practice in the World's Church (Independence, Mo.: Herald House) ISBN 0-8309-0624-X
- —— (1984). The Worshiping Community (Independence, Mo.: Herald House) ISBN 0-8309-0403-4
- —— (1983). Distinctives Yesterday and Today (Independence, Mo.: Herald House) ISBN 0-8309-0378-X
- —— (1978). The Sacraments : An Exploration into Their Meaning and Practice in the Saint's Church (Independence, Mo.: Herald House) ISBN 0-8309-0225-2

Community of Christ titles
Preceded by James C. Cable	Council of Twelve Apostles; 1996 to 2000	Succeeded by Bunda C. Chibwe; Leonard M. Young
Preceded by Howard S. Sheehy, Jr.	Counselor in the First Presidency; April 2000–June 3, 2005	Succeeded by David D. Schaal
