= L. F. P. Curry =

American politician and RLDS Church leader

Lemuel Florence Patterson Curry
- Born: July 22, 1887; Rodfield, Pennsylvania, U.S.
- Died: January 23, 1977 (aged 89); Independence, Missouri, U.S.
- Education: Brown University, Carnegie Institute of Technology, University of Pittsburgh
- Occupation(s): Mayor, Religious Leader
- Known for: Mayor of Independence, Missouri; Leader in the RLDS Church

Lemuel Florence Patterson Curry (July 22, 1887 – January 23, 1977) was an American leader in the Reorganized Church of Jesus Christ of Latter Day Saints (RLDS Church) and was the mayor of Independence, Missouri, from 1962 to 1966.

== Biography ==
Curry was born in Rodfield, Pennsylvania. He was educated at Brown University, the Carnegie Institute of Technology, and the University of Pittsburgh.

Throughout his adult life, Curry was a leader in the RLDS Church. On February 12, 1931, he became a member of the church's presiding bishopric. On April 17, 1932 he succeeded Albert Carmichael as the Presiding Bishop of the RLDS Church. Curry was selected as a counselor to RLDS Church president Frederick M. Smith in the church's First Presidency in 1938; Curry served in this capacity and as Presiding Bishop simultaneously until 1940, when G. Leslie DeLapp was appointed to succeed Curry as Presiding Bishop. Curry was Smith's counselor in the First Presidency until Smith's death in 1946. When Israel A. Smith assumed the position of president of the church, he did not ask Curry to rejoin the First Presidency.

Curry was elected mayor of Independence, Missouri in 1962. He served for four years, until 1966. Curry died at Independence at age 89.

Until 2016, Curry was the only person to serve concurrently as the presiding bishop of the church and as a member of the First Presidency. (In 2016, Stassi D. Cramm was appointed to serve in both positions simultaneously.)

== Notes ==
Community of Christ titles
Preceded by Floyd M. McDowell	Counselor in the First Presidency; October 1938–April 9, 1946	Succeeded by John F. Garver; F. Henry Edwards
