= Duane E. Couey =

Ecclesiastical leader in the Community of Christ

Presiding Patriarchs/Evangelist Community of Christ
- March 29, 1982 – April 5, 1992
- Called by: Wallace B. Smith
- Predecessor: Reed M. Holmes
- Successor: Paul W. Booth
- End reason: Honorably released

Counselor in the First Presidency
- April 18, 1966 – March 1982
- Called by: Wallace B. Smith
- Predecessor: F. Henry Edwards
- Successor: Alan D. Tyree
- End reason: Called as Presiding Patriarchs/Evangelist

Council of Twelve Apostles
- April 2, 1960 – April 18, 1966
- Called by: W. Wallace Smith
- Predecessor: Edmund J. Gleazer
- Successor: Earl T. Higdon
- End reason: Called as counselor in the First Presidency

Personal details
- Born: Duane Emerson Couey; September 13, 1924; Milwaukee, Wisconsin, US
- Died: March 26, 2004 (aged 79); Independence, Missouri, US
- Spouse(s): Edith Griswold; Margaret Rushing
- Children: Four; Two (by Edith); Patricia Henshaw; Ralph Couey; Two(adopted); Freda Clenden; Cathy Davis
- Parents: Ralph Couey; Hazel Lindsey

Duane Emerson Couey (September 13, 1924 – March 26, 2004) was an American leader in the Reorganized Church of Jesus Christ of Latter Day Saints (RLDS Church). He was a member of the church's Council of Twelve Apostles and First Presidency and also served a term as the church's Presiding Patriarch.

Couey was born and raised in Milwaukee, Wisconsin. He was in the United States Navy during World War II, serving as a Petty Officer First Class Radioman aboard the destroyer escort Earl K Olson. After the war, he briefly worked as a manager in a plastics plant in Milwaukee, Wisconsin before becoming a missionary for the RLDS Church, becoming a full-time RLDS Church minister in 1954. He was president of the Los Angeles, California Stake from 1958 to 1960.

On 2 April 1960, Couey was selected by RLDS Church president W. Wallace Smith to become an apostle of the church and a member of the Council of Twelve Apostles. At this time, he moved to Independence, Missouri, where the headquarters of the RLDS Church were located. He served in the Council of Twelve Apostles until 1966, when Smith selected him to replace the retiring F. Henry Edwards as one of Smith's counselors in the First Presidency of the church.

When W. Wallace Smith retired and was succeeded by his son Wallace B. Smith in 1978, Wallace B. Smith selected Couey and Howard S. Sheehy Jr. to be his counselors in the new First Presidency. In 1982, he was released in the First Presidency and succeeded by Alan D. Tyree. At this time, Smith appointed Couey to succeed Reed M. Homes as the Presiding Patriarch of the RLDS Church. In April 1992, he was released from this calling and retired from full-time ecclesiastical service. He was succeeded in this position by Paul W. Booth.

Couey was also a theologian, administrator and mentor to many of the younger church appointees. He married Edith Griswold of Madison, Wisconsin in 1947, and had two children, Patricia Louise, born in Milwaukee in 1952, and Ralph Floyd, born in 1955 in Paris, Tennessee. Patricia was an expert in the field of learning disabilities. Ralph is an intelligence analyst with the U.S. Department of Justice. Edith died of cancer in 1982. Duane remarried Margaret Rushing of Paris, Tennessee, in 1987. She too died from cancer, in 2003. He died in 2004 in Independence, Missouri, aged 79.

== Notes ==
Community of Christ titles
Preceded by Reed M. Holmes	Presiding Patriarchs/Evangelist; 29 March 1982 – 5 April 1992	Succeeded by Paul W. Booth
Preceded by F. Henry Edwards	Counselor in the First Presidency; 18 April 1966 - 29 March 1982	Succeeded by Alan D. Tyree
Preceded by Edmund J. Gleazer	Council of Twelve Apostles; 2 April 1960 – 18 April 1966	Succeeded by Earl T. Higdon
