= Floyd M. McDowell =

American RLDS Church leader (1889–1964)

Floyd Marion McDowell (26 March 1889 – 27 October 1964) was an American leader in the Reorganized Church of Jesus Christ of Latter Day Saints (RLDS Church). McDowell was a member of the church's First Presidency from 1922 to 1938.

McDowell was born in Excelsior, Wisconsin. He attended Graceland College from 1907 to 1909, and he later received degrees from Iowa State University (BA, 1911), Clark University (MA, 1914), and University of Iowa (Ph.D., 1918). He lived most of his life in Lamoni, Iowa, where the RLDS Church headquarters were located.

On 2 October 1922, McDowell was selected as a counselor to RLDS Church president Frederick M. Smith in the church's First Presidency. In April 1938, McDowell's fellow counselor Elbert A. Smith was released; later that year, McDowell resigned as a member of the First Presidency. Frederick Smith selected Israel A. Smith and Lemuel F. P. Curry to succeed Elbert Smith and McDowell.

After his resignation, McDowell became the RLDS Church's Director of Priesthood Education, a position he held until 1954, when he became a patriarch in the church. From 1922 to 1952, McDowell was also a member of the Board of Trustees of Graceland College.

== Sources ==
- Roy Cheville (1970). They Made a Difference (Independence, Mo.: Herald House) pp. 327–338
- History of the Reorganized Church of Jesus Christ of Latter Day Saints 7:709–711
- "Obituary: Floyd M. McDowell", Saints' Herald, vol. 111, no. 23, pp. 822–823 (1964)

Community of Christ titles
Preceded by Frederick M. Smith	Counselor in the First Presidency; October 2, 1922–October 1938	Succeeded by Israel A. Smith; Lemuel F.P. Curry
