= First Presidency (Community of Christ) =

Highest ecclesiastical body in Community of Christ

The First Presidency of Community of Christ, formerly the Reorganized Church of Jesus Christ of Latter Day Saints, is the church's highest-ranking priesthood quorum. It is composed of the Prophet-President and two counselors, and they preside over the whole church under the principles of "theocratic democracy" observed in the governance of the church. This includes responsibility for the World Conference, field ministries, priesthood quorums and orders, and headquarters functions. The president of the Church holds the priesthood office of Prophet and is also a High Priest.

In 1860 with the reorganization of the First Presidency, Joseph Smith III became the second prophet-president of this church and also president of a new First Presidency. William Marks became Smith's First Counselor.

In Community of Christ, each new church president has generally been "designated" as the successor by the preceding church president. The counselors in the First Presidency are then chosen by the church president and are often, but not required, to be former or current members of the Council of Twelve Apostles. In addition, the death or resignation of the Prophet-President does not dissolve the First Presidency, which continues on as the church's executive council in the persons of the remaining two presidents until a Prophet-President is called. The two members who were counselors to the prophet-president cease to be counselors during this time. Upon ordination of the Prophet-President, the former First Presidency is dissolved, and upon ordination of the two counselors, it is reorganized. Members of the First Presidency are not members of the Quorum of Twelve nor do they hold the priesthood office of apostle, regardless of previous calling.

Prior to 1996, all prophet-presidents were descendants of the movement's founder, Joseph Smith Jr. This pattern was broken by Wallace B. Smith, who designated W. Grant McMurray church president. McMurray, in turn, resigned the church presidency in 2004 without designating a successor. A joint council of church leaders led by the Council of Twelve Apostles announced in March 2005 that Stephen M. Veazey was selected as Prophet-President designate. Veazey had been serving as president of the Council of Twelve. Delegates elected to a special World Conference of the church approved Veazey and he was ordained as the 8th president of the High Priesthood, Prophet, and President of the Church on June 3, 2005.

At the 2007 World Conference, Becky L. Savage was ordained as the first woman to serve in the First Presidency. Bunda C. Chibwe became the first African man to serve in the First Presidency at the 2025 World Conference.

Current members of the First Presidency are:

- President Stassi D. Cramm, President of the Church
- President Bunda C. Chibwe (Counselor to the president)
- President Janné C. Grover (Counselor to the president)

== Chronology ==
=== During the lifetime of Joseph Smith Jr. ===
Both the Community of Christ and the Church of Jesus Christ of Latter-day Saints consider themselves the continuation of the Church of Jesus Christ of Latter Day Saints established by Joseph Smith Jr. in 1832.

Dates	Prophet-President of the Church		Counselors		Change
8 March 1832 – 3 December 1832	Joseph Smith Jr.	Joseph Smith Jr. Oliver Cowdery Hyrum Smith John C. Bennett	Jesse Gause; Sidney Rigdon	Sidney Rigdon Frederick G. Williams Oliver Cowdery Hyrum Smith John Smith Joseph Smith, Sr. William Law Amasa Lyman	Initial organization of First Presidency
3 December 1832 – 18 March 1833	Joseph Smith Jr.	Joseph Smith Jr. Oliver Cowdery Hyrum Smith John C. Bennett	Sidney Rigdon	Sidney Rigdon Frederick G. Williams Oliver Cowdery Hyrum Smith John Smith Joseph Smith, Sr. William Law Amasa Lyman	Jesse Gause excommunicated
18 March 1833 – 5 December 1834	Joseph Smith Jr.	Joseph Smith Jr. Oliver Cowdery Hyrum Smith John C. Bennett	Sidney Rigdon; Frederick G. Williams	Sidney Rigdon Frederick G. Williams Oliver Cowdery Hyrum Smith John Smith Joseph Smith, Sr. William Law Amasa Lyman	Frederick G. Williams called as Counselor
5 December 1834 – 3 September 1837	Joseph Smith Jr. Oliver Cowdery (Assistant President)	Joseph Smith Jr. Oliver Cowdery Hyrum Smith John C. Bennett	Sidney Rigdon; Frederick G. Williams	Sidney Rigdon Frederick G. Williams Oliver Cowdery Hyrum Smith John Smith Joseph Smith, Sr. William Law Amasa Lyman	Oliver Cowdery called as Assistant President of the Church
3 September 1837 – 7 November 1837	Joseph Smith Jr. Oliver Cowdery (Assistant President)	Joseph Smith Jr. Oliver Cowdery Hyrum Smith John C. Bennett	Sidney Rigdon; Frederick G. Williams; Oliver Cowdery (Assistant Counselor); Hyrum Smith (Assistant Counselor); John Smith (Assistant Counselor); Joseph Smith Sr. (Assistant Counselor)	Sidney Rigdon Frederick G. Williams Oliver Cowdery Hyrum Smith John Smith Joseph Smith, Sr. William Law Amasa Lyman	Hyrum Smith, John Smith and Joseph Smith Sr. called as Assistant Counselors; Oliver Cowdery also given the title of Assistant Counselor
7 November 1837 – 11 April 1838	Joseph Smith Jr. Oliver Cowdery (Assistant President)	Joseph Smith Jr. Oliver Cowdery Hyrum Smith John C. Bennett	Sidney Rigdon; Hyrum Smith; Oliver Cowdery (Assistant Counselor); Joseph Smith Sr. (Assistant Counselor); John Smith (Assistant Counselor)	Sidney Rigdon Frederick G. Williams Oliver Cowdery Hyrum Smith John Smith Joseph Smith, Sr. William Law Amasa Lyman	Frederick G. Williams rejected as Counselor at church conference; Hyrum Smith called as Counselor
11 April 1838 – 14 September 1840	Joseph Smith Jr.	Joseph Smith Jr. Oliver Cowdery Hyrum Smith John C. Bennett	Sidney Rigdon; Hyrum Smith; Joseph Smith Sr. (Assistant Counselor); John Smith (Assistant Counselor)	Sidney Rigdon Frederick G. Williams Oliver Cowdery Hyrum Smith John Smith Joseph Smith, Sr. William Law Amasa Lyman	Oliver Cowdery excommunicated
14 September 1840 – 24 January 1841	Joseph Smith Jr.	Joseph Smith Jr. Oliver Cowdery Hyrum Smith John C. Bennett	Sidney Rigdon; Hyrum Smith; John Smith (Assistant Counselor)	Sidney Rigdon Frederick G. Williams Oliver Cowdery Hyrum Smith John Smith Joseph Smith, Sr. William Law Amasa Lyman	Death of Joseph Smith Sr.
24 January 1841 – 8 April 1841	Joseph Smith Jr. Hyrum Smith (Assistant President)	Joseph Smith Jr. Oliver Cowdery Hyrum Smith John C. Bennett	Sidney Rigdon; William Law; John Smith (Assistant Counselor)	Sidney Rigdon Frederick G. Williams Oliver Cowdery Hyrum Smith John Smith Joseph Smith, Sr. William Law Amasa Lyman	Hyrum Smith called as Assistant President of the Church; William Law replaces Hyrum Smith as Counselor
8 April 1841 – 25 May 1842	Joseph Smith Jr. Hyrum Smith (Assistant President); John C. Bennett (Assistant President)	Joseph Smith Jr. Oliver Cowdery Hyrum Smith John C. Bennett	Sidney Rigdon; William Law; John Smith (Counselor)	Sidney Rigdon Frederick G. Williams Oliver Cowdery Hyrum Smith John Smith Joseph Smith, Sr. William Law Amasa Lyman	John C. Bennett called as Assistant President
25 May 1842 – 4 February 1843	Joseph Smith Jr. Hyrum Smith (Assistant President)	Joseph Smith Jr. Oliver Cowdery Hyrum Smith John C. Bennett	Sidney Rigdon; William Law; John Smith (Assistant Counselor)	Sidney Rigdon Frederick G. Williams Oliver Cowdery Hyrum Smith John Smith Joseph Smith, Sr. William Law Amasa Lyman	John C. Bennett disfellowshipped
4 February 1843 – 18 April 1844	Joseph Smith Jr. Hyrum Smith (Assistant President)	Joseph Smith Jr. Oliver Cowdery Hyrum Smith John C. Bennett	Sidney Rigdon; William Law; John Smith (Assistant Counselor); Amasa M. Lyman (Counselor)	Sidney Rigdon Frederick G. Williams Oliver Cowdery Hyrum Smith John Smith Joseph Smith, Sr. William Law Amasa Lyman	Amasa M. Lyman called as Counselor
18 April 1844 – 27 June 1844	Joseph Smith Jr. Hyrum Smith (Assistant President)	Joseph Smith Jr. Oliver Cowdery Hyrum Smith John C. Bennett	Sidney Rigdon; John Smith (Assistant Counselor); Amasa M. Lyman (Counselor)	Sidney Rigdon Frederick G. Williams Oliver Cowdery Hyrum Smith John Smith Joseph Smith, Sr. William Law Amasa Lyman	Apostasy of William Law

=== Reorganization ===
Following the murder of Joseph Smith Jr. in 1844, several church leaders claimed to be his successor. Emma Hale Smith initially supported William Marks, who ultimately declined to pursue his claim. When the majority of the church followed Brigham Young west, she remained in Nauvoo with her children. In 1860, her eldest son, Joseph Smith III, reestablished the First Presidency as leadership of the Reorganized Church of Jesus Christ of Latter-day Saints.

Dates	Prophet-President of the Church		Counselors		Change
6 April 1860 – 6 April 1863	Joseph Smith III	Joseph Smith III	William Marks William W. Blair David Hyrum Smith R. C. Evans Frederick M. Smith Elbert A. Smith	Reorganization of church with Joseph Smith III as prophet–president	
6 April 1863 – May 22, 1872	Joseph Smith III	Joseph Smith III	William Marks William W. Blair David Hyrum Smith R. C. Evans Frederick M. Smith Elbert A. Smith	William Marks	William Marks called as Counselor
May 22, 1872 – April 10, 1873	Joseph Smith III	Joseph Smith III	William Marks William W. Blair David Hyrum Smith R. C. Evans Frederick M. Smith Elbert A. Smith		Death of William Marks
April 10, 1873 – 1885	Joseph Smith III	Joseph Smith III	William Marks William W. Blair David Hyrum Smith R. C. Evans Frederick M. Smith Elbert A. Smith	William W. Blair; David Hyrum Smith	William W. Blair and David Hyrum Smith called as Counselors
1885 – April 18, 1896	Joseph Smith III	Joseph Smith III	William Marks William W. Blair David Hyrum Smith R. C. Evans Frederick M. Smith Elbert A. Smith	William W. Blair	Release of David Hyrum Smith due to ill health and incapacitation
April 18, 1896 – April 18, 1902	Joseph Smith III	Joseph Smith III	William Marks William W. Blair David Hyrum Smith R. C. Evans Frederick M. Smith Elbert A. Smith		Death of William W. Blair
April 18, 1902 – April 19, 1909	Joseph Smith III	Joseph Smith III	William Marks William W. Blair David Hyrum Smith R. C. Evans Frederick M. Smith Elbert A. Smith	R. C. Evans; Frederick M. Smith	R. C. Evans and Frederick M. Smith called as Counselors
April 19, 1909 – December 10, 1914	Joseph Smith III	Joseph Smith III	William Marks William W. Blair David Hyrum Smith R. C. Evans Frederick M. Smith Elbert A. Smith	Frederick M. Smith; Elbert A. Smith	R. C. Evans released and Elbert A. Smith called as replacement
May 5, 1915 – October 2, 1922	Frederick M. Smith	Frederick M. Smith	Elbert A. Smith	Elbert A. Smith Israel A. Smith	Frederick M. Smith ordained prophet–president after death of Joseph Smith III; Elbert A. Smith retained as Counselor
October 2, 1922 – April 7, 1938	Frederick M. Smith	Frederick M. Smith	Elbert A. Smith; Floyd M. McDowell	Elbert A. Smith Israel A. Smith	Floyd M. McDowell called as Counselor
April 7, 1938 – October 1938	Frederick M. Smith	Frederick M. Smith	Floyd M. McDowell	Elbert A. Smith Israel A. Smith	Elbert A. Smith released as Counselor
October 1938 – March 20, 1946	Frederick M. Smith	Frederick M. Smith	Israel A. Smith; Lemuel F.P. Curry	Elbert A. Smith Israel A. Smith	Floyd M. McDowell resigns as Counselor; Israel A. Smith and Lemuel F.P. Curry added as Counselors
April 9, 1946 – March 1949	Israel A. Smith	Israel A. Smith	John F. Garver; F. Henry Edwards		Reorganization of First Presidency after death of Frederick M. Smith
March 1949 – April 2, 1950	Israel A. Smith	Israel A. Smith	F. Henry Edwards		Death of John F. Garver
April 2, 1950 – June 14, 1958	Israel A. Smith	Israel A. Smith	F. Henry Edwards; W. Wallace Smith		W. Wallace Smith called as Counselor
October 8, 1958 – April 18, 1966	W. Wallace Smith		F. Henry Edwards; Maurice L. Draper		Reorganization of First Presidency after death of Israel A. Smith
April 18, 1966 – March 29, 1976	W. Wallace Smith		Maurice L. Draper; Duane E. Couey		F. Henry Edwards released and replaced with Duane E. Couey
March 29, 1976 – April 3, 1978	W. Wallace Smith; Wallace B. Smith (Assistant and prophet–president designate)		Maurice L. Draper; Duane E. Couey		Wallace B. Smith added as an assistant to W. Wallace Smith and given title prophet–president designate
April 3, 1978 – March 29, 1982	Wallace B. Smith		Duane E. Couey; Howard S. Sheehy, Jr.		Reorganization of First Presidency upon retirement of W. Wallace Smith
March 29, 1982 – April 5, 1992	Wallace B. Smith		Howard S. Sheehy, Jr. Alan D. Tyree		Duane E. Couey released and replaced with Alan D. Tyree
April 5, 1992 – April 15, 1996	Wallace B. Smith		Howard S. Sheehy, Jr. W. Grant McMurray		Alan D. Tyree released and replaced with W. Grant McMurray
April 15, 1996 – April 2000	W. Grant McMurray		Howard S. Sheehy, Jr. Kenneth N. Robinson		Reorganization of First Presidency upon retirement of Wallace B. Smith
April 2000 – June 3, 2005	W. Grant McMurray		Kenneth N. Robinson; Peter A. Judd		Howard S. Sheehy, Jr. released and replaced with Peter A. Judd
June 3, 2005 – March 1, 2007	Stephen M. Veazey		Kenneth N. Robinson; David D. Schaal		Reorganization of First Presidency upon resignation of W. Grant McMurray
March 1, 2007 – May 7, 2012	Stephen M. Veazey		David D. Schaal; Becky L. Savage		Kenneth N. Robinson released and replaced with Becky L. Savage
March 7, 2012 – April 16, 2013	Stephen M. Veazey		Becky L. Savage		David D. Schaal released, seat vacant for a year
April 16, 2013 – March 31, 2016	Stephen M. Veazey		Becky L. Savage; K. Scott Murphy		K. Scott Murphy called as counselor
March 31, 2016 – May 31, 2025	Stephen M. Veazey		Stassi D. Cramm; K. Scott Murphy		Becky L. Savage released and replaced with Stassi D. Cramm
June 6, 2025 –	Stassi D. Cramm		Bunda C. Chibwe; Janné C. Grover		Reorganization of First Presidency upon retirement of Stephen M. Veazey
