= John F. Garver =

John Franklin Garver (28 January 1878 – 3 March 1949) was an American leader in the Reorganized Church of Jesus Christ of Latter Day Saints (RLDS Church).

Garver was born in Bristol, Indiana. He was educated at Graceland College. In 1912, Garver became a member of the Board of Trustees of Graceland College; he was also a leader of the RLDS Church in Lamoni, Iowa.

On 13 October 1922, RLDS Church president Frederick M. Smith appointed Garver as an apostle of the church and a member of the Council of Twelve Apostles. At this time, Garver moved to Independence, Missouri, where the headquarters of the RLDS Church had been moved to in 1915. He was elected as the president of the Board of Trustees for Graceland College in 1932.

Garver was a member of the Council of Twelve Apostles until April 1946, when new church president Israel A. Smith selected Garver and F. Henry Edwards as his counselors in the church's First Presidency. Garver served in this capacity until his death in Independence at the age of 71. He was succeeded in the First Presidency by W. Wallace Smith.

== Sources ==
- History of the Reorganized Church of Jesus Christ of Latter Day Saints 7:711-13
- "John F. Garver", Saints' Herald, vol. 96, no. 12 (1949) pp. 265–270

Community of Christ titles
Preceded by Israel A. Smith; Lemuel F.P. Curry	Counselor in the First Presidency; April 9, 1946–March 3, 1949	Succeeded by W. Wallace Smith
Preceded by Ulysses W. Greene	Council of Twelve Apostles; October 13, 1922–April 9, 1946	Succeeded by D. Blair Jensen
