= W. Grant McMurray =

Prophet-President of Community of Christ (1996–2004)

Prophet–President of the Church
- April 15, 1996 – November 29, 2004
- Predecessor: Wallace B. Smith
- Successor: Stephen M. Veazey
- Reason: designated successor by Wallace B. Smith
- End reason: resigned for personal and family matters

Counselor in the First Presidency
- April 5, 1992 – April 15, 1996
- Called by: Wallace B. Smith
- Predecessor: Alan D. Tyree
- Successor: Kenneth N. Robinson
- Reason: release of Alan D. Tyree
- End reason: became Prophet–President of the Church

Personal details
- Born: William Grant McMurray; July 12, 1947 (age 79); Toronto, Canada
- Education: Bachelor of arts Master of divinity
- Alma mater: Graceland University; University of Missouri–Kansas City; Saint Paul School of Theology
- Spouse(s): Joyce Lorance McMurray

W. Grant McMurray (born July 12, 1947) is an American religious leader who served as Prophet-President of Community of Christ from 1996 until 2004. He was the first non-descendant of Joseph Smith to head the church and first Canadian to lead the denomination. Under McMurray's administration, the Reorganized Church of Jesus Christ of Latter Day Saints (RLDS Church) changed its name to Community of Christ.

== Biography ==
William Grant McMurray was born in Toronto, Ontario, Canada, to parents who were members of the RLDS Church. He lived in Toronto until his teenage years, when his family moved to Independence, Missouri, where his mother accepted employment at the church headquarters of the RLDS Church. He attended Graceland College and St. Paul School of Theology in Kansas City, Missouri, where he earned a master's degree in theology, making McMurray the first president of the RLDS Church who was trained at a seminary.

In 1973, McMurray began employment with the historical department of the RLDS Church. In 1982, he became the church's World Church Secretary, and in 1992, he became a member of the First Presidency as a counselor to church president Wallace B. Smith. In 1995, Smith announced his retirement and named McMurray as his successor. It was the first time that a non-descendant of church-founder Joseph Smith had been named to head the church.

== McMurray's presidency and legacy ==
McMurray became the president of the church in 1996.

In 1997, McMurray called upon the RLDS Church to transform itself by articulating a Christ-centered theology of peace. In 2001, the church changed its name to Community of Christ, evoking the original name of the church "Church of Christ," affirming the centrality of Christ to the church, and commemorating the Latter Day Saint movement's long-held tradition of building up "Zionic communities".

McMurray presided over the first ordination of a woman to the office of apostle in the Council of Twelve. He also led the Community of Christ to a closer fraternal (but not doctrinal) relationship with the Church of Jesus Christ of Latter-day Saints, building both friendly relations and collaborative historical efforts.

== McMurray's resignation ==
On November 29, 2004, McMurray resigned as president of the church. McMurray's resignation letter stated, "However, along the way I have made some inappropriate choices, and the circumstances of my life are now such that I cannot continue to effectively lead the church. I deeply regret the difficulties that this causes for the church I love." The letter also stated that he had recently been diagnosed with early onset Parkinson's disease, but his health was not a motivating factor to his resignation.

When later interviewed regarding his resignation letter, McMurray stated, "Beyond that, it's an entirely personal and family matter and the letter says what I felt I needed to say."

A joint council of church leaders led by the Council of Twelve Apostles announced in March 2005 the name of Stephen M. Veazey as Prophet-President designate. Veazey had been serving as president of the Council of Twelve. Delegates elected to a special World Conference of the church approved Veazey and he was ordained to the presidency on June 3, 2005.

== See also ==
- Kenneth N. Robinson

Community of Christ titles
Preceded by Wallace B. Smith	Prophet–President; 1996–2004	Succeeded by Stephen M. Veazey
Preceded by Alan D. Tyree	Counselor in the First Presidency; April 5, 1992–April 15, 1996 April 5, 1992—April 15, 1996	Succeeded by Kenneth N. Robinson
