= R. C. Evans =

Canadian Latter Day Saint leader

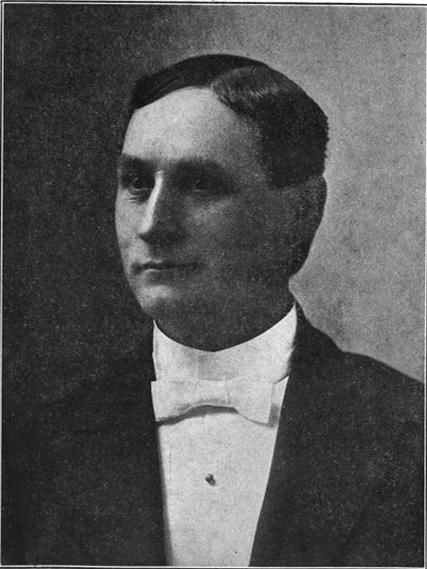
A 1909 portrait of R. C. Evans during his time as bishop in the Reorganized Church of Jesus Christ of Latter Day Saints

Richard Charles Evans (October 20, 1861 – January 18, 1921) was a Canadian apostle and member of the First Presidency in the Reorganized Church of Jesus Christ of Latter Day Saints (RLDS Church, now the Community of Christ) who became the leader of a schismatic sect that separated from the RLDS Church in 1918.

== Biography ==
Evans was born in St. Andrews in Argenteuil County, Province of Canada, in present-day Quebec. On November 5, 1876, at the age of 15, Evans was baptized in the Thames River in Ontario by RLDS Church preacher J. J. Cornish. In 1882, Evans became a priest in the church, and in 1884 and 1886 he became an elder and a seventy, respectively.

On April 12, 1897, at a general conference of the RLDS Church, Evans was made an apostle and a member of the Council of Twelve Apostles. On April 20, 1902, Evans became a counselor in the First Presidency to Joseph Smith III, the Prophet–President of the RLDS Church. Evans became distressed when Smith designated his son, Frederick M. Smith, as the foreordained successor to the church presidency in 1906. Consequently, in 1909, Evans was released from the First Presidency and was ordained to the office of bishop. As a bishop, Evans was given jurisdiction over the church in Canada. When Joseph Smith III died in 1914 and Frederick Smith took control of the church, Evans' frustration over being overlooked as a worthy successor continued to grow.

In 1918, Evans broke with the RLDS Church. Evans had complained about Prophet–President Frederick M. Smith's administrative style and the church's continuing denials that Latter Day Saint movement founder Joseph Smith had practiced and taught plural marriage. A number of RLDS Church members in Toronto followed Evans, and they began a church they called the Church of the Christian Brotherhood. Evans used some of the RLDS Church's money to fund the new church's activities. In 1919, the RLDS Church sued Evans in the Supreme Court of Ontario to recover these funds; while the case was dismissed at trial, the church's appeal was successful and Evans' church was forced to return the funds to the RLDS Church. Shortly before the trial, Evans was excommunicated from the RLDS Church for apostasy and mismanagement of church funds.

In 1920, Evans published a book explaining why he left the RLDS Church. He wrote that while the "Reorganized 'Mormon Church' does not teach or practice polygamy", the "great sin" of the church "is in denying that Joseph Smith, their prophet, seer and revelator, received revelations commanding the church to enter into that God dishonoring and woman debasing doctrine under pain of eternal damnation". Faced with these facts, Evans concluded that he "could no longer believe that God and Christ visited and conversed with Smith" and that he must have been a false prophet. Although it was not central to his reasoning, Evans opined that Frederick M. Smith was "neither a prophet, seer, revelator nor God's mouth-piece to the church, but is an autocrat, cruel and tricky, and selfish in his methods."

Evans died in Toronto from pneumonia.

== Publications ==
- R.C. Evans (1909). Autobiography of Bishop R.C. Evans of the RLDS Church (Lamoni, Iowa: Herald Publishing House)
- —— (1912). Sermons (London, Ontario. advertiser job print). 420 pp. Weekly Sunday evening sermons delivered in 1911, some from his Soho Street church and the rest from the Princess Theatre. Originally appeared as columns in the Toronto Sunday World
- —— (1918). The Songs, Poems, Notes and Correspondence of Bishop R.C. Evans and Some Addresses presented to him from many parts of the world (London, Ontario: The Advertiser Job Printing Co). 208 pp.
- —— (1920). Forty Years in the Mormon Church: Why I Left It! (Toronto: R.C. Evans)

== See also ==
- Blood atonement: Accusation by R. C. Evans

== Notes ==
Community of Christ titles
Preceded by William W. Blair	Counselor in the First Presidency; April 18, 1902–April 19, 1909	Succeeded by Elbert A. Smith
