= David Hyrum Smith =

RLDS Church leader and youngest son of Joseph and Emma Smith (1844–1904)

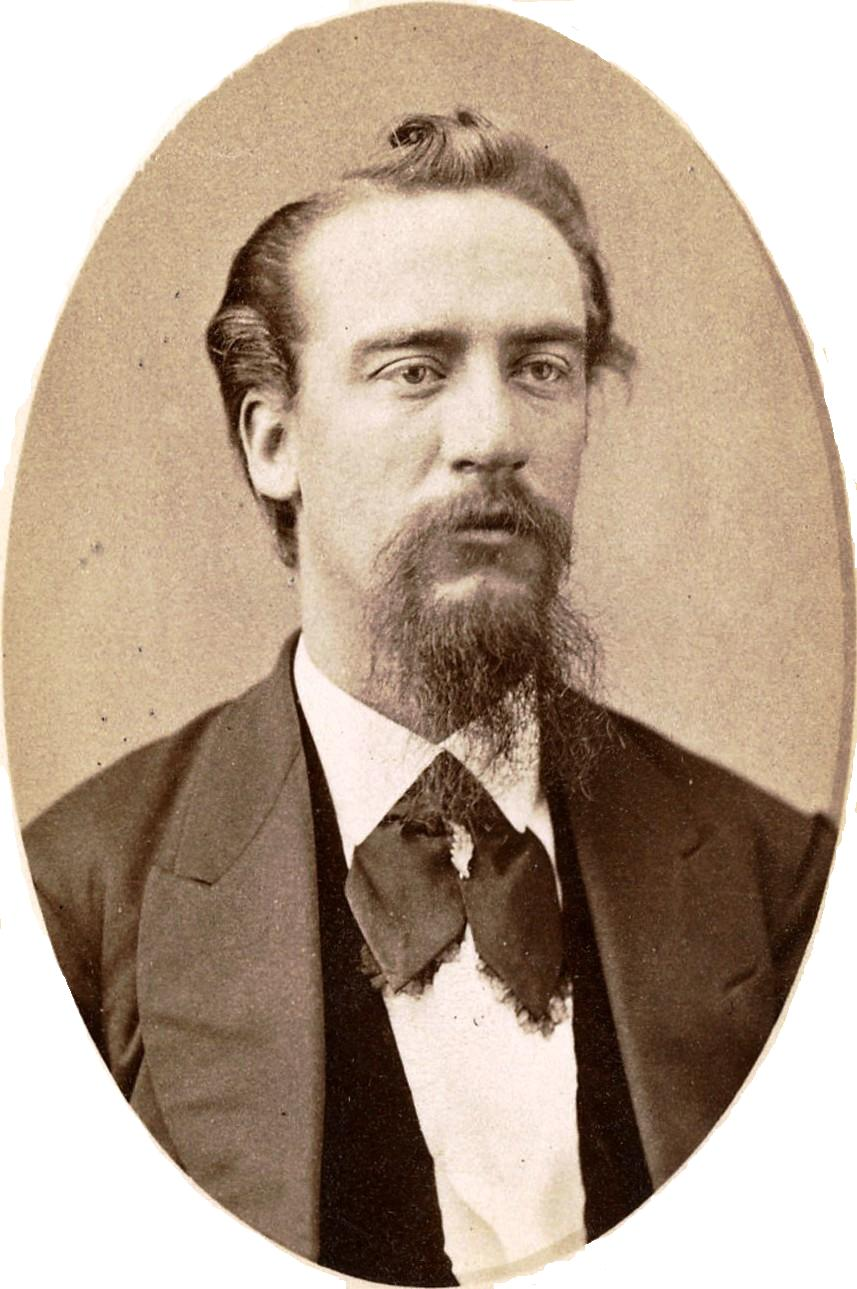
- ca. 1870

Second Counselor in the First Presidency
- April 10, 1873 – April 1885
- Called by: Joseph Smith III
- Predecessor: William Marks
- Successor: R. C. Evans; Frederick M. Smith

Personal details
- Born: November 17, 1844; Nauvoo, Illinois, U.S.
- Died: August 29, 1904 (aged 59); Elgin, Illinois, U.S.
- Spouse(s): Clara Hartshorn (m. 1870–1904)
- Children: Elbert A. Smith
- Parents: Joseph Smith, Jr. Emma Hale Smith

David Hyrum Smith (November 17, 1844 – August 29, 1904) was an American religious leader, poet, painter, singer, philosopher, and naturalist. The youngest son of Joseph Smith and Emma Hale Smith, he was an influential missionary and leader in the Reorganized Church of Jesus Christ of Latter Day Saints (RLDS Church). He was born approximately five months after the murder of his father. Joseph told Emma before he died what the child's name should be. From December 1847, David was raised by his mother and her second husband, Lewis C. Bidamon.

Smith was a highly effective missionary for the RLDS Church. From 1865 to 1873, he conducted missionary trips throughout the Midwest, Utah Territory, and California, debating preachers of different theologies, including representatives of the Church of Jesus Christ of Latter-day Saints (LDS Church). From 1873 to 1885, Smith was a counselor to his brother Joseph Smith III in the First Presidency of the RLDS Church. Later David's son Elbert A. Smith became a member of the First Presidency and a Presiding Patriarch in the RLDS Church.

Smith was called the "Sweet Singer of Israel" because many who knew him, who heard him sing and joined him in song, said that he was the most inspiring singer of God they had encountered. The Joseph Smith Historic Site, maintained by the Community of Christ, houses Smith's original paintings of Nauvoo, Illinois.

In a 1998 biography of Smith, From Mission to Madness: Last Son of the Mormon Prophet, author Valeen Tippetts Avery describes Smith's mental deterioration, starting with a probable breakdown early in 1870. In an 1869 letter to his mother, Emma Hale Smith, Smith had written at age 24:

Mother I must tell you ... I feel very sad and the tears run out of my eyes all the time and I don't know why. ... strive as I will my heart sinks like lead. ... I must tell someone my troubles.

Smith was confined to Northern Illinois Hospital and Asylum for the Insane beginning in 1877. He was held there for most of 27 years, dying in the hospital in 1904. Avery's biography draws on a large body of Smith's correspondence and poetry to examine both his personality and his emotional state.

== Notes ==
Community of Christ titles
Preceded by William Marks	Counselor in the First Presidency; April 10, 1873–April 1885	Succeeded by R. C. Evans; Frederick M. Smith; 1902
