= Kenneth N. Robinson =

Community of Christ church leader

Kenneth N. Robinson was a member of the First Presidency of the Community of Christ from 1996 to 2007. Robinson was also an apostle and a member of the Council of Twelve Apostles of the church from 1980 to 1996.

Robinson, a native of Perth, Western Australia, became a counselor to W. Grant McMurray, the seventh prophet-president of the Reorganized Church of Jesus Christ of Latter Day Saints (RLDS Church), in 1996. (The RLDS Church changed its name to Community of Christ in 2001). Robinson had been an apostle of the church since 1980. When McMurray resigned in 2005, Robinson and fellow counselor Peter A. Judd led the church until Stephen M. Veazey was selected as the new president. Veazey selected Robinson and David D. Schaal as his counselors in the First Presidency.

Robinson retired from his position in the First Presidency in 2007 and was ordained to the priesthood office of evangelist. He was ordained to this office and replaced in the First Presidency by Becky L. Savage, who became the first female member of the First Presidency in church history. Upon Robinson's retirement, Veazey acknowledged Robinson as having been a "driving force behind the church's expansion outside North America".

== Notes ==
Community of Christ titles
Preceded by W. Grant McMurray	Counselor in the First Presidency; April 2000–March 1, 2007	Succeeded by Becky L. Savage
