= W. Wallace Smith =

Leader of the RLDS Church (1900–1989)

Prophet Emeritus
- April 5, 1978 – August 4, 1989

Prophet–President of the Church
- October 6, 1958 – April 5, 1978
- Predecessor: Israel A. Smith
- Successor: Wallace B. Smith
- Reason: Doctrine of Lineal succession
- End reason: Granted emeritus status

Counselor in the First Presidency
- April 2, 1950 – October 8, 1958
- Called by: Israel A. Smith
- Predecessor: John F. Garver
- Successor: Maurice L. Draper
- Reason: Death of John F. Garver
- End reason: Became Prophet–President of the Church

Council of Twelve Apostles
- April 7, 1947 – October 8, 1958
- Called by: Israel A. Smith
- Predecessor: John W. Rushton
- Successor: Donald O. Chesworth
- Reason: Honorable release of Rushton
- End reason: Called as counselor in the First Presidency

Personal details
- Born: William Wallace Smith; November 18, 1900; Lamoni, Iowa, U.S.
- Died: August 4, 1989 (aged 88); Independence, Missouri, U.S.
- Resting place: Mound Grove Cemetery; 39°6′41.20″N 94°25′34.78″W
- Alma mater: University of Missouri
- Spouse(s): Rosamund Bunnell Smith
- Children: 2, including Wallace B. Smith
- Parents: Joseph Smith III
- Website: Our History: W. Wallace Smith

William Wallace Smith (November 18, 1900 – August 4, 1989) was a grandson of Joseph Smith Jr. and Prophet-President of the Reorganized Church of Jesus Christ of Latter Day Saints (Community of Christ), from October 6, 1958, to April 5, 1978, when he retired to "emeritus" status.

== Biography ==
W. Wallace Smith was born in Lamoni, Iowa, on November 18, 1900, to Joseph Smith III and his third wife Ada R. Clark. Smith graduated from the University of Missouri in 1924. He entered the ministry of the RLDS Church in 1928 and was ordained an apostle and joined the Council of Twelve Apostles on April 7, 1947, after the honorable release of John W. Rushton. On April 2, 1950, Smith was called as counselor to Israel A. Smith, his half brother, in the First Presidency, and was replaced in the Quorum of the Twelve by Donald O. Chesworth. Smith died in Independence, Missouri on August 4, 1989.

== President of the Church ==
Smith was the third of his father's sons to succeed to the presidency of the church, assuming the presidency after the deaths of his brothers Frederick M. Smith and Israel A. Smith.

=== Church Growth ===
Following a 1960 worldwide missionary tour, W. Wallace Smith's tenure as church president saw substantial overseas growth in the church, especially in Africa, Latin America, and the Far East. Also during his administration, the church saw significant doctrinal and practical changes, characterized by vigorous efforts in ecumenism, liberalism and internationalization of the group's message.

=== The Independence Temple of Zion ===
The building of temples is part of the overall tradition of the Latter Day Saint movement. For several decades the idea of building of an "Independence Temple of Zion" had been part of RLDS Church tradition. However, nothing specific had been said or done by the leadership of the RLDS Church for several decades. In 1972, W. Wallace brought the concept to the forefront in a document that called for "defining the purpose and selecting the place for erecting a temple."

=== Breaking with lineal succession ===
In 1958, instead of calling Lynn Smith to replace his father in the office of Presiding Patriarch, W. Wallace Smith named Roy Cheville to the office, in a break with an RLDS traditional doctrine of lineal succession.

The inter-relationship of the offices of President of the Church (also known as "Prophet-President") and Presiding Patriarch (also known a Presiding Evangelist) in the Smith family, and the doctrine of Lineal succession, of pre and post-reorganization in the Community of Christ:

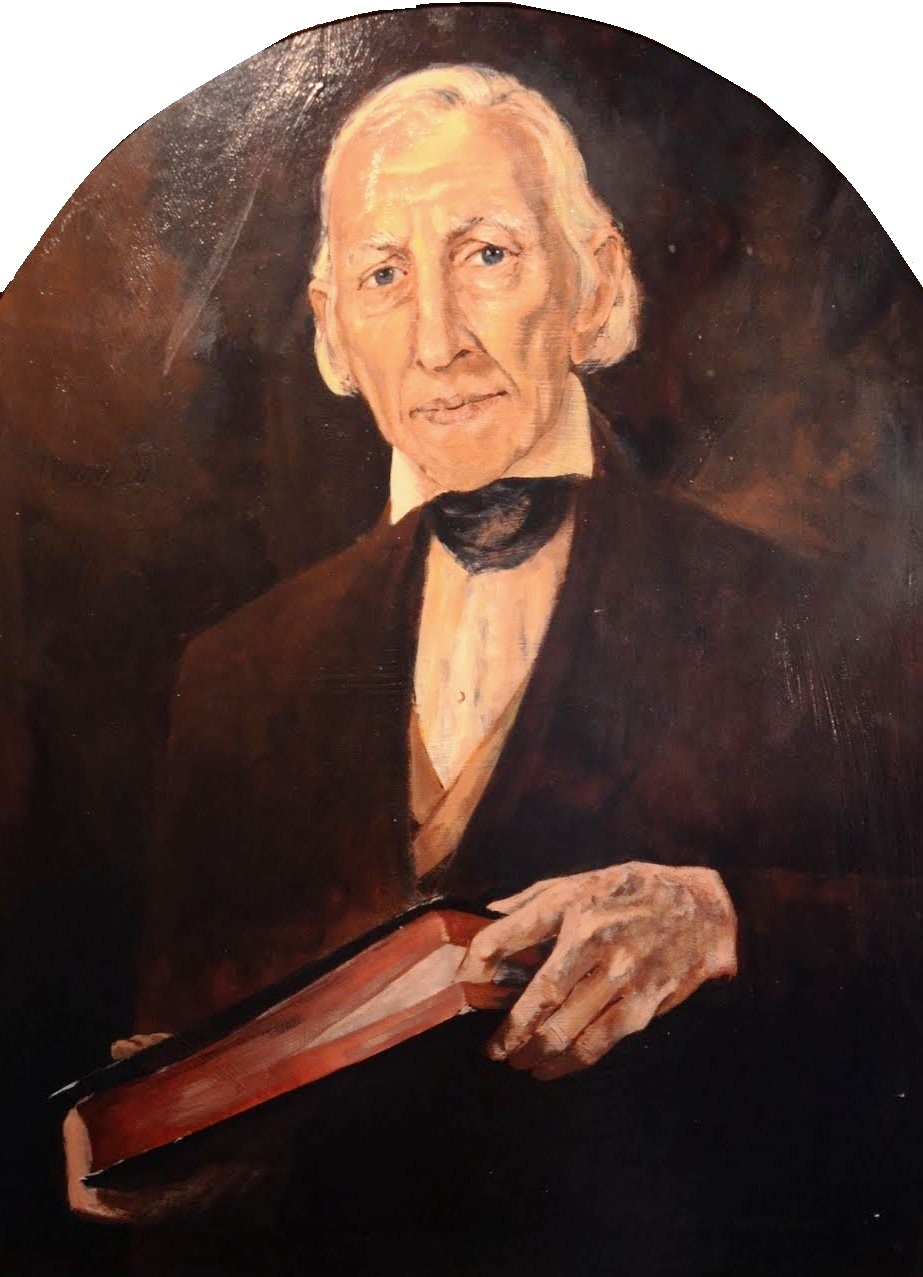
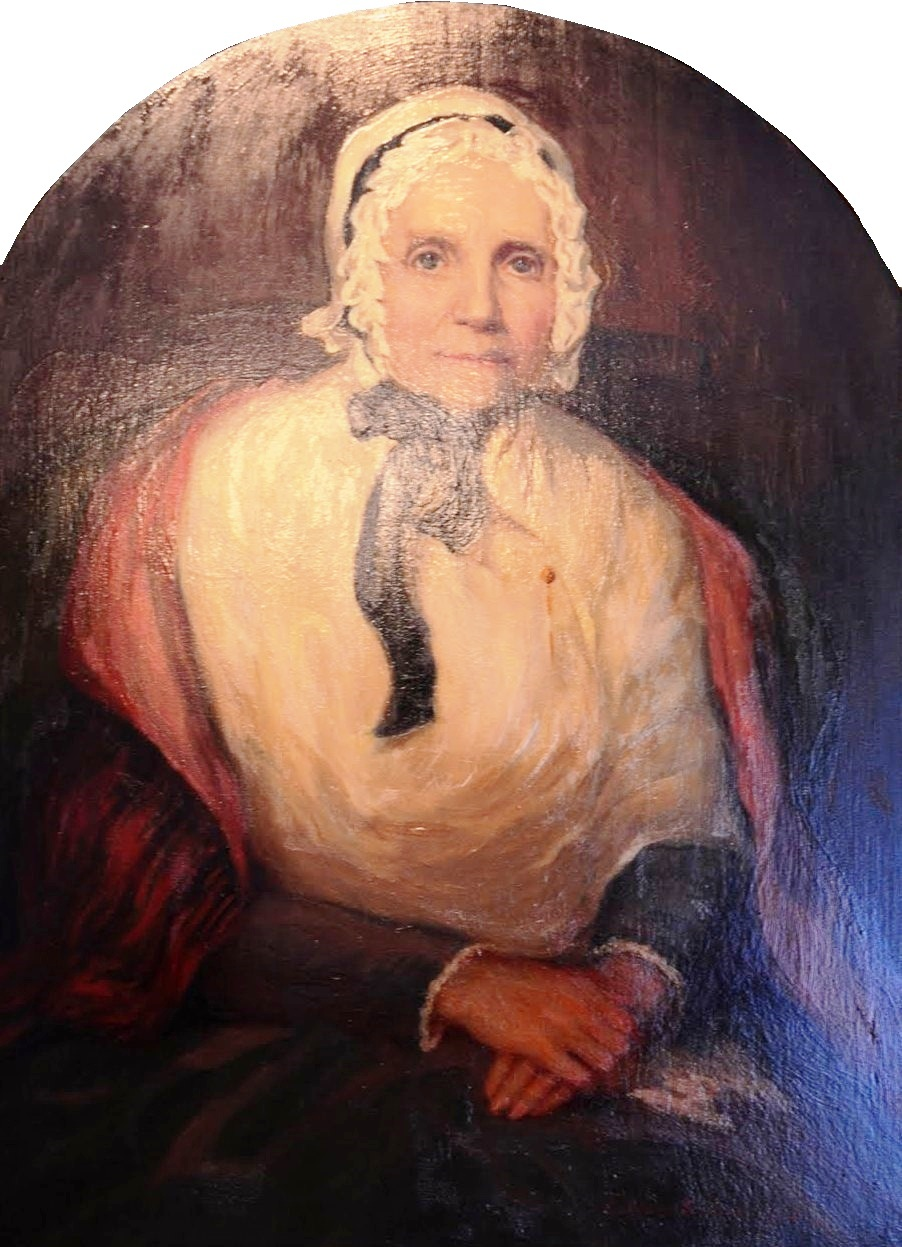
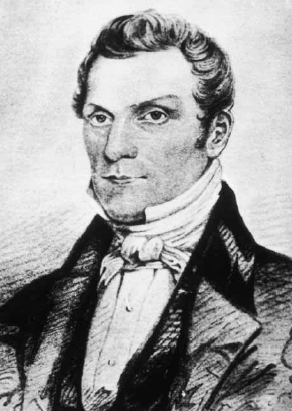
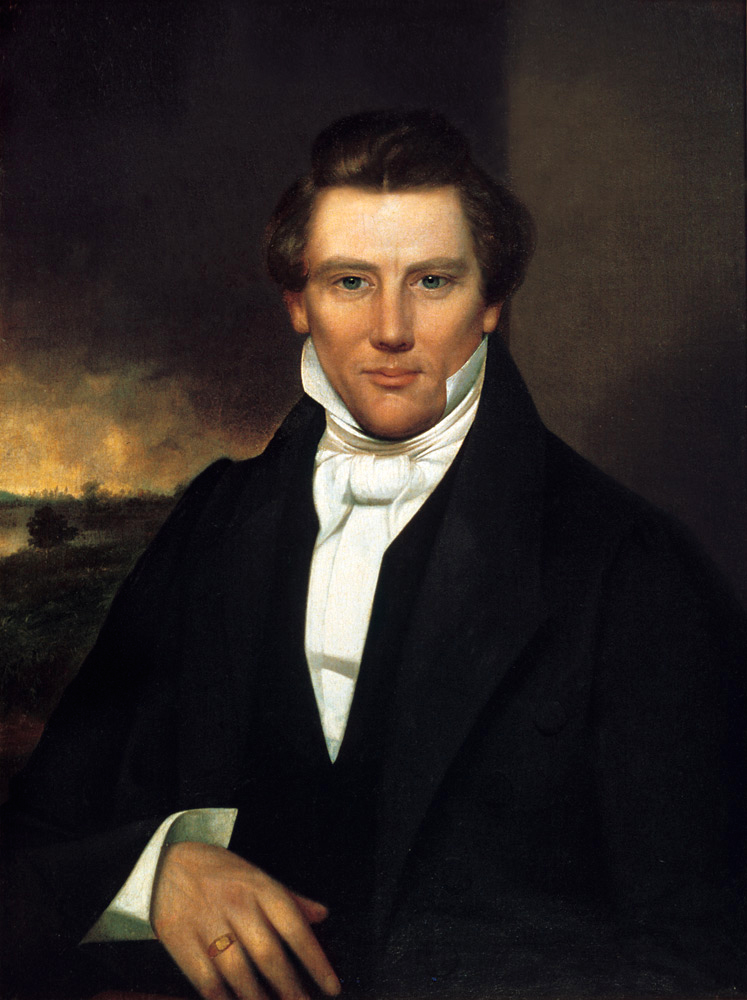
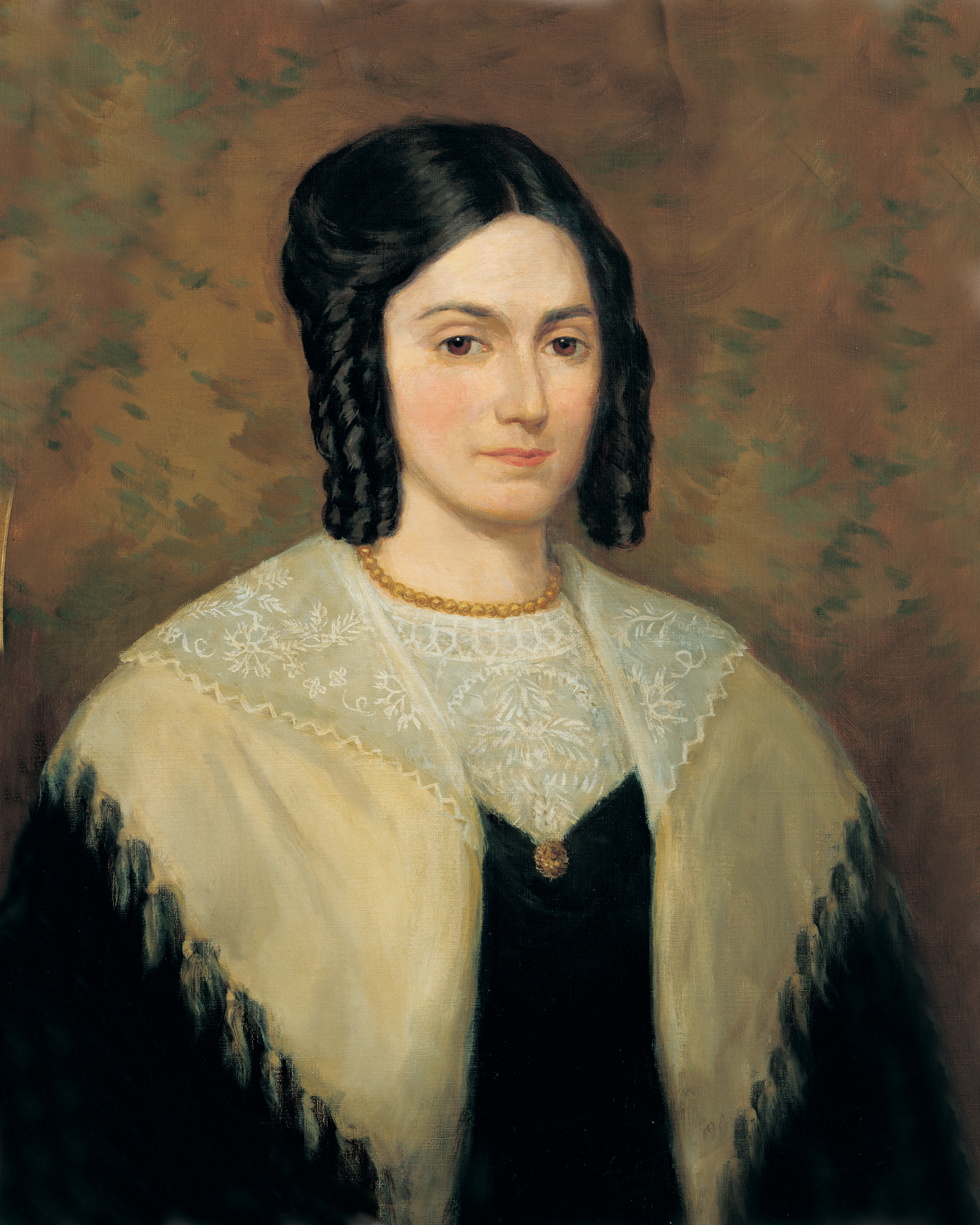
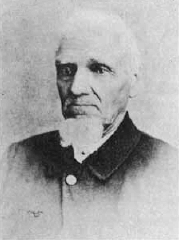
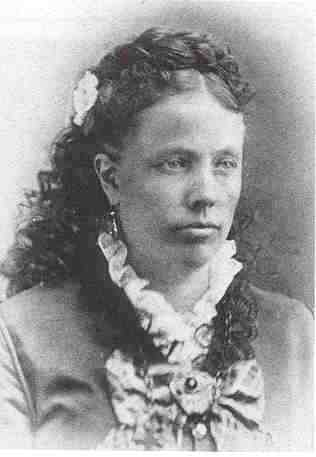
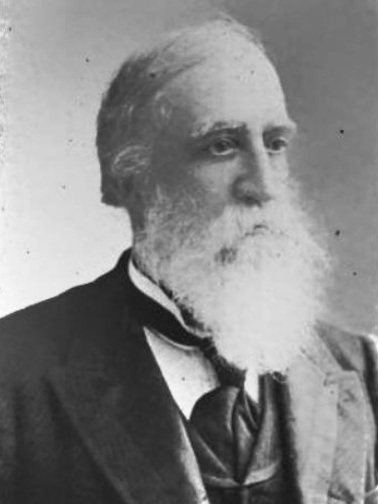
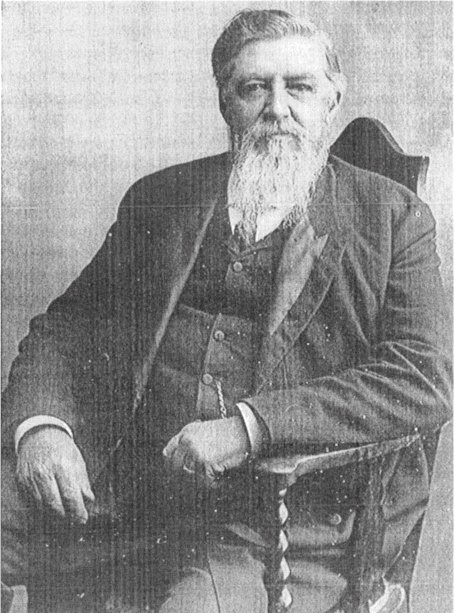
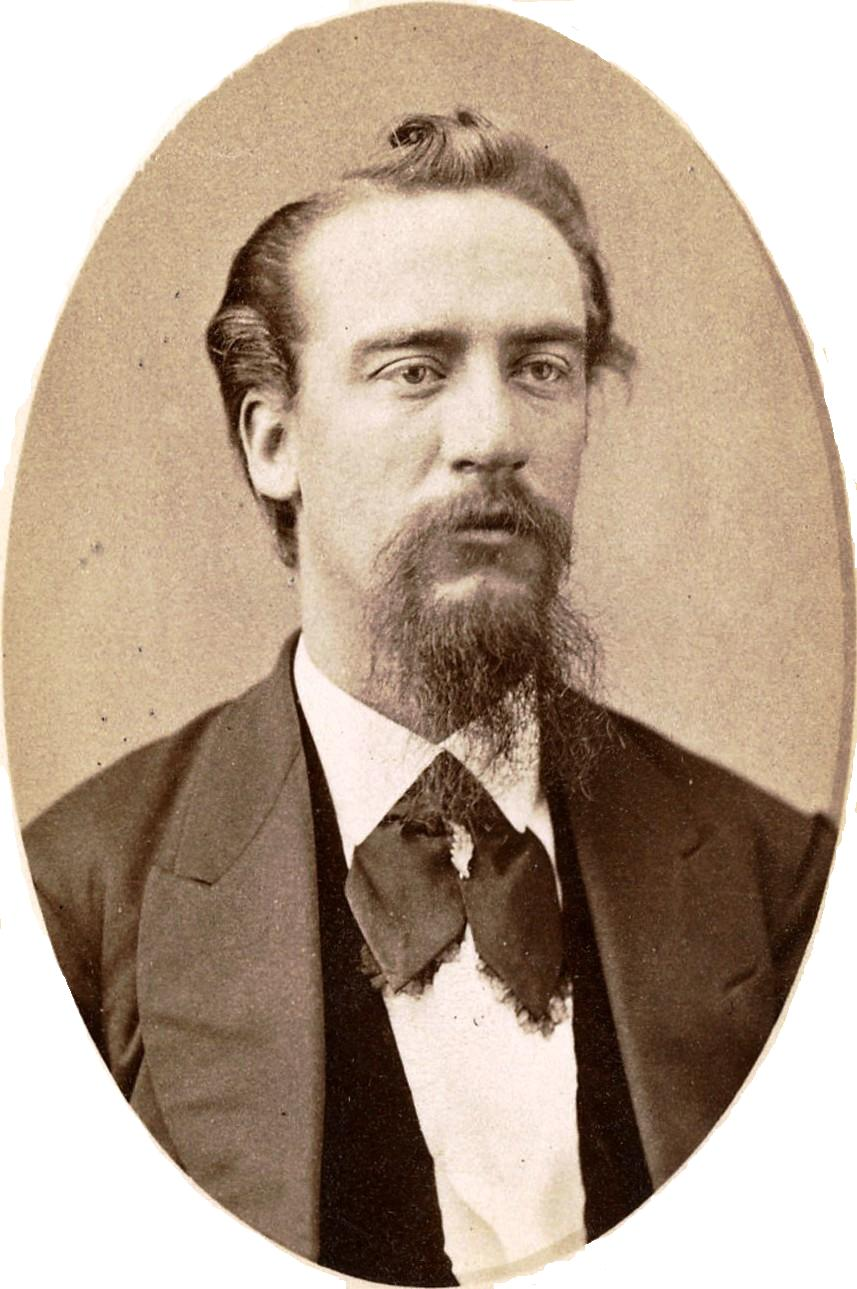
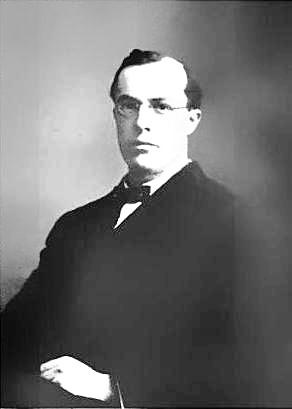
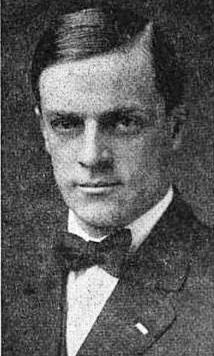
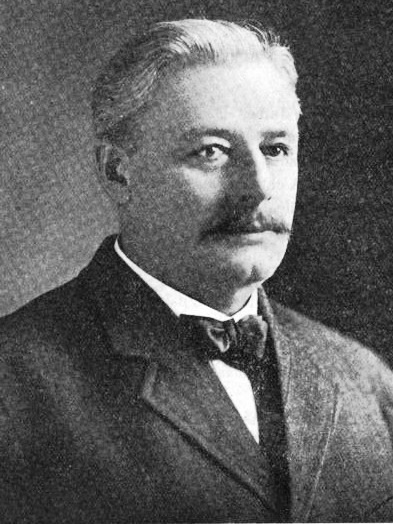
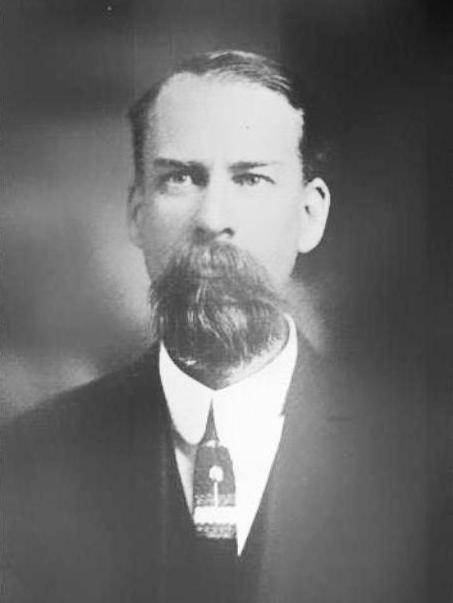
Joseph Smith, Sr. 1771–1840; Presiding Patriarch (1833–1840)	Lucy Mack Smith; 1776–1856
Hyrum Smith; 1800–1844; Presiding Patriarch (1841–1844)	Joseph Smith, Jr. 1805–1844; President of the Church (1830–1844)	Emma Hale Smith; 1804–1879; Elect Lady	William B. Smith; 1811–1893; Presiding Patriarch (1845)
Bertha Madison; 1843–1896	Joseph Smith III; 1832–1914; Prophet-President (1860–1914)	Ada Clark; 1871–1914	Alexander Hale Smith; 1838–1909; Presiding Patriarch (1897–1902)	David Hyrum Smith; 1844–1904
Frederick M. Smith; 1874–1946; Prophet–President (1914–1946)	Israel A. Smith; 1876–1958; Prophet–President (1946–1958)	W. Wallace Smith; 1900–1989; Prophet–President (1958–1978)	Frederick A. Smith; 1862–1954; Presiding Patriarch (1913–1938)	Elbert A. Smith; 1871–1959; Presiding Patriarch (1938–1958)

=== Retirement ===
Smith designated his son, Wallace B. Smith as his successor in 1976, and on April 5, 1978, he became the first president of the church to retire to "emeritus" status — all previous presidents had served until their deaths. To ensure a smooth transition, W.W. Smith read a letter of resignation shortly before his son was ordained.

== See also ==
Community of Christ titles
Preceded by None	Prophet Emeritus; April 5, 1978–August 4, 1989; With: Wallace B. Smith	Succeeded by N/A
Preceded by Israel A. Smith	Prophet–President; October 6, 1958–April 5, 1978	Succeeded by Wallace B. Smith
Preceded by John F. Garver	Counselor in the First Presidency; April 2, 1950–October 8, 1958	Succeeded by Maurice L. Draper
Preceded by John W. Rushton	Council of Twelve Apostles; April 7, 1947–April 2, 1950	Succeeded by Donald O. Chesworth
