= William W. Blair =

American RLDS Church leader (1828–1896)

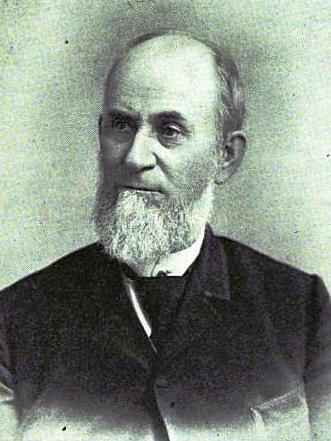

First Presidency of the RLDS Church
- April 10, 1873 – June 18, 1896
- Called by: Joseph Smith III
- Predecessor: William Marks
- Successor: R. C. Evans; Frederick M. Smith
- Reason: Death of William Marks

Council of Twelve Apostles
- 1858 – April 10, 1873
- Called by: Joseph Smith III
- End reason: Called as counselor in the First Presidency

Personal details
- Born: William Wallace Blair; October 11, 1828; Holley, New York, US
- Died: June 18, 1896 (aged 67); Lamoni, Iowa, US
- Resting place: Rose Hill Cemetery; 40.625°N 93.9475°W
- Spouse(s): Elizabeth J Doty
- Children: 7

William Wallace Blair (October 11, 1828 – April 18, 1896) was an apostle and a member of the First Presidency of the Reorganized Church of Jesus Christ of Latter Day Saints (RLDS Church).

Blair was born in Holley, New York. In 1839, his family moved to LaSalle County, Illinois. In 1851, Blair encountered missionaries from the Latter Day Saint movement. On October 8, 1851, Blair was baptized by William Smith, the younger brother of Joseph Smith, the founder of the Latter Day Saint movement.

In 1852, Blair became somewhat disenchanted with William Smith and some of his associates when he "learned that some of the leading elders were walking in unrighteousness". Blair investigated and temporarily aligned himself with Charles B. Thompson's Baneemyites, but ultimately decided that it "was not the work of God."

In 1855, Blair aligned himself with John E. Page and Hazen Aldrich, who were claiming to have reorganized the true Church of Christ. However, in late 1856, Blair aligned himself with Latter Day Saints, including William Marks, Jason W. Briggs, and Zenas H. Gurley, who were teaching that a "reorganization" of Joseph Smith's church needed to be effected under Smith's son Joseph Smith III. On April 7, 1857, Blair was re-baptized into this "reorganization" by Gurley. The following day, he was ordained as a high priest and on October 7, 1858, at a church conference in Zarahemla, Wisconsin, Blair was ordained an apostle of the reorganization and he became a member of the Council of Twelve Apostles.

On October 8, 1860, shortly after the RLDS Church was formally organized, Blair was assigned as a missionary to Nauvoo, Illinois, Far West, Missouri, and Council Bluffs, Iowa. Blair was a successful missionary and baptized many individuals into the RLDS Church.

On April 10, 1873, Blair was chosen by prophet–president Joseph Smith III to be his first counselor in the First Presidency. He served in this capacity until his sudden death while traveling home to Lamoni, Iowa from a church conference in Kirtland, Ohio.

Blair was married to Elizabeth J. Doty and was the father of seven children.

== Publications ==
- W.W. Blair (1877). Joseph the Seer (Lamoni, Iowa: Herald Publishing House)
- —— (Frederick B. Blair ed.) (1908). (Lamoni, Iowa: Herald Publishing House)

== Notes ==
Community of Christ titles
Preceded by William Marks	Counselor in the First Presidency; April 10, 1873–April 18, 1896	Succeeded by R. C. Evans; Frederick M. Smith
Preceded by —	Member of the Council of Twelve Apostles; 1858–April 10, 1873	Succeeded by William H. Kelley; Thomas Wood Smith; James Caffall; John H. Lake; Alexander Hale Smith
