= Stephen M. Veazey =

Prophet-President of Community of Christ (2005–2025)

Prophet–President of the Church
- June 3, 2005 – June 1, 2025
- Predecessor: W. Grant McMurray
- Successor: Stassi D. Cramm
- Reason: "Church-wide discernment process" following the resignation of W. Grant McMurray

President of the Council of Twelve Apostles
- April 2002 – June 3, 2005
- Called by: Committee of Church Leaders
- End reason: Called as Prophet-President

Council of Twelve Apostles
- April 5, 1992 – June 3, 2005
- Called by: Wallace B. Smith
- End reason: Called as Prophet-President

Personal details
- Born: Stephen Mark Veazey
- Education: Bachelor of Science; Master of Arts in religion
- Alma mater: University of Tennessee; Park College
- Spouse(s): Cathleen Henson Cackler Veazey
- Children: Three

Stephen Mark Veazey is a former Prophet-President of Community of Christ, headquartered in Independence, Missouri. Veazey's name was presented to the church in March 2005 by a joint council of church leaders led by the Council of Twelve Apostles, as the next Prophet-President. Delegates elected to a special World Conference of the church approved Veazey and he was ordained as the eighth President of the High Priesthood, Prophet, and President of the Church on June 3, 2005.

Born in Tennessee, on May 3, 1957, Veazey has been a full-time minister in the church since 1983. He lives in Paris, Tennessee. He was ordained a member of the Council of Twelve Apostles in 1992. In April 2002, he was set apart as president of the Council of Twelve and assigned by the First Presidency as director of Field Ministries. He has also brought support and leadership to Church Planting Ministries and Young Adult and Campus Ministries. His areas of ministry have included missionary and administrative work in the Southern USA Mission Field, the Africa-East Central Field; the South Central and the East Central States Regions; the Division of Program Services, Outreach Ministries; the North Central Region; the Advanced Leadership Studies at World Church headquarters; and the African-American Ministries.

Before 1983, Veazey was an executive minister to the Fremont, California, congregation and was in charge of a missionary development project funded by the World Church for San Francisco Bay Stake. Veazey also served the church as a young adult two-year contractual minister to Pacific Northwest Region, in the Portland Metropole; director of youth camps and seminars; field associate for the Young Adult and Campus Ministries Office; presiding elder in McKenzie, Tennessee; and counselor to the pastor in Paris, Tennessee. He holds a Bachelor of Science degree from the University of Tennessee and a Master of Arts in religion from Park College.

Veazey presented Doctrine and Covenants Section 163 to the 2007 World Conference of the Community of Christ. He cited the Hymns of the Saints as a source for this document, which clarifies the theology of scripture, the mission of the church, and other ecclesiastical matters in Community of Christ.

On January 17, 2010, Veazey presented another document which became part of the Doctrine and Covenants. A very short message of inspired counsel was included in the President's April 5, 2009 address to the church. On April 14, 2010, Community of Christ voted to affirm the counsel as scripture, and it was added to the Doctrine and Covenants as section 164. Doctrine and Covenants Section 165, from an inspired document of Veazey's, was canonized in 2016.

On March 6, 2023, Veazey announced that he would be retiring in 2025 and would initiate a process for the Council of Twelve to discern the next prophet-president. On January 18, 2024, following several meetings to consider two to three candidates each from a list shared anonymously by the church, the Council of Twelve designated Stassi D. Cramm, a member of the First Presidency, as the next prophet-president. Cramm was confirmed as prophet-president at the 2025 World Conference, which is the first time that a woman has headed the denomination.

== Notes ==
Community of Christ titles
Preceded by W. Grant McMurray	Prophet-President; 2005–	Succeeded by incumbent
