= Israel A. Smith =

Leader in the Latter Day Saint movement (1876–1958)

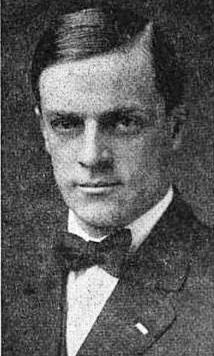
- Smith circa 1920

Prophet–President
- April 9, 1946 – June 14, 1958
- Predecessor: Frederick M. Smith
- Successor: W. Wallace Smith
- Reason: Death of Frederick M. Smith

Counselor in the First Presidency
- October 1938 – June 14, 1958
- Called by: Frederick M. Smith
- Predecessor: Floyd M. McDowell
- Successor: John F. Garver; F. Henry Edwards
- Reason: Resignation of Floyd M. McDowell

Second counselor in the Presiding Bishopric
- 1920 – 1925
- Called by: Frederick M. Smith

General Assembly of Iowa

In office
- 1911 – 1913

Personal details
- Born: Israel Alexander Smith; February 2, 1876; Plano, Illinois, U.S.
- Died: June 14, 1958 (aged 82); Lamoni, Iowa, U.S.
- Cause of death: Car accident
- Resting place: Mound Grove Cemetery; 39°6′42.71″N 94°25′36.51″W
- Occupation: Lawyer
- Spouse(s): Nina Marie Grenawalt Smith
- Children: 2
- Parents: Joseph Smith III; Emmeline Griswold Smith

Israel Alexander Smith (February 2, 1876 – June 14, 1958) was the fourth son of Joseph Smith III and a grandson of Joseph Smith Jr., the founder of the Latter Day Saint movement. Israel A. Smith succeeded his brother, Frederick M. Smith, as Prophet-President of the Reorganized Church of Jesus Christ of Latter Day Saints (Community of Christ) on April 9, 1946.

== Biography ==
Smith was born in Plano, Illinois, on February 2, 1876, the third son and fourth child of Joseph Smith III and his second wife Bertha Madison. In 1881, he moved with his family to Lamoni, Iowa, the site of a growing colony of Latter Day Saints of the Reorganization. He attended Graceland College from 1898 to 1900 and later received a B.A. in law from Lincoln-Jefferson University of Hammond, Indiana. From 1911 to 1913 he served as a Republican in the Iowa House of Representatives.

Smith's brother, Frederick, became Prophet-President in 1914. Smith became a counselor in the Presiding Bishopric in 1920. In 1922, many believed that Smith would be called to fill a vacancy in the First Presidency, but Frederick instead called Floyd M. McDowell. Frederick also introduced the concept of "Supreme Directional Control" regarding authority over leadership and finances, which Israel opposed as contrary to the teachings of their father, Joseph Smith III. In 1925, Israel was released from the Presiding Bishopric.

Meanwhile, Supreme Directional Control and other changes related to Frederick's leadership precipitated a schism. Many members including Otto Fetting renounced the Reorganization and joined with the Church of Christ (Temple Lot).

From 1929 to 1940, Israel served as the church's general secretary and in 1940, he was finally called to fill a vacancy as First Counselor in the First Presidency. Frederick also designated Israel as his successor at this time. In 1946, upon Frederick's death, Israel became Prophet-President of the Church.

The end of World War II, saw further expansion of the Church overseas. In 1950, Smith went on a Pacific tour, visiting members of the Church in Hawaii, Australia, New Zealand and Tahiti. In 1952, he toured branches of the Church in Europe.

Smith died in a car accident on June 14, 1958, while driving north along U.S. Highway 69 from Independence, Missouri, to Lamoni, Iowa. After his death, the First Presidency continued to function, composed of the two counselors W. Wallace Smith and F. Henry Edwards until a World Conference of the church confirmed W. Wallace Smith as his brother's successor later that fall.

== General references ==
- Hiles, Norma Derry (1991). Gentle Monarch: The Presidency of Israel A. Smith. Independence, MO: Herald House. ISBN 9780830905775.
- Scherer, Mark A. (2013). The Journey of a People: The Era of Reorganization, 1844 to 1946. Independence, MO: Community of Christ Seminary Press. ISBN 978-0-8309-1559-0.
- Scherer, Mark A. (2015). The Journey of a People: The Era of Worldwide Community, 1844 to 1946. Independence, MO: Community of Christ Seminary Press.

Community of Christ titles
Preceded by Frederick M. Smith	Prophet–President; April 9, 1946–June 14, 1958	Succeeded by W. Wallace Smith
Preceded by Floyd M. McDowell	Counselor in the First Presidency; October 1938–April 9, 1946	Succeeded by John F. Garver; F. Henry Edwards
