= Assistant President of the Church =

Defunct position in the Latter Day Saint church

Assistant President of the Church (also referred to as Associate President of the Church) was a position in the leadership hierarchy in the early days of the Latter Day Saint church founded by Joseph Smith. The Assistant President was the second-highest authority in the church and was a member of the church's governing First Presidency. As President of the Church, Smith appointed two (possibly three) men to serve in the position of Assistant President. After Smith's death, most Latter Day Saint denominations discontinued the position of Assistant President of the Church.

== Oliver Cowdery ==
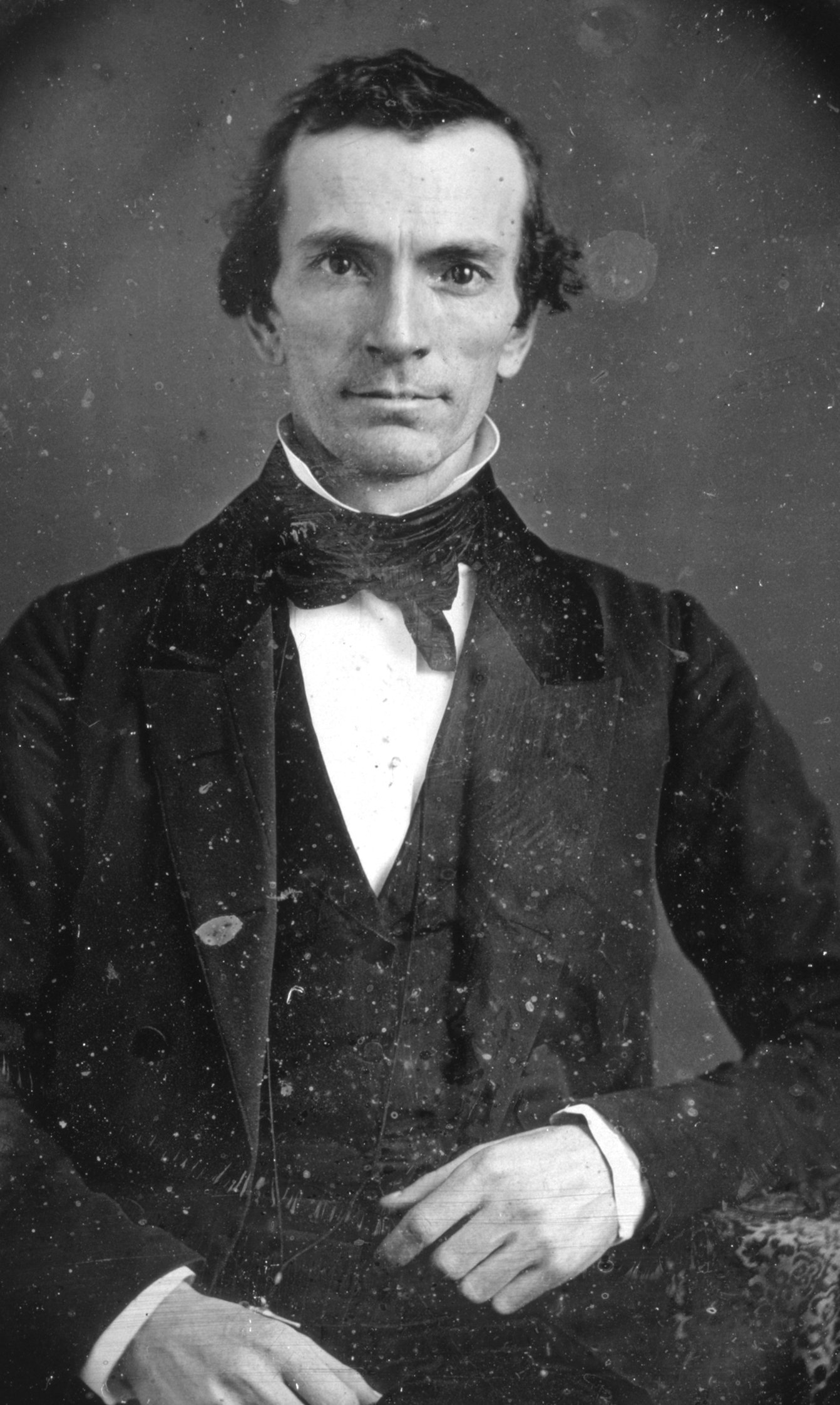
Oliver Cowdery

On December 5, 1834, Smith ordained Oliver Cowdery to be his "assistant-president". The minutes of this meeting state that Smith said the following words after laying his hands on Cowdery's head: "In the name of Jesus Christ, who was crucified for the sins of the world, I lay my hands upon thee and ordain thee an assistant-president to the High and Holy Priesthood, in the Church of the Latter-day Saints."

At the organization of the church in 1830, Cowdery had been designated the "second elder" of the church. After Smith organized the First Presidency in 1832, Cowdery's standing in the church hierarchy had become uncertain. Cowdery's ordination as Assistant President reaffirmed his status as second only to Smith in church authority.

== Duties ==
After Cowdery's ordination, Smith explained the purpose of the position of Assistant President:

The office of Assistant President is to assist in presiding over the whole Church, and to officiate in the absence of the President, according to his rank and appointment .... The office of this priesthood is also to act as spokesman, taking Aaron for an example. The virtue of the above priesthood is to hold the keys of the kingdom of heaven or of the Church militant.

As holder of the keys of the priesthood, the Assistant President of the Church was intended to be the person who would succeed to the presidency of the church upon the death of Smith. The Assistant President ranked higher than the counselors in the First Presidency and the President and members of the Quorum of the Twelve Apostles. Like the members of the First Presidency and the Twelve, the Assistant President was accepted by the church as a prophet, seer, and revelator. The Assistant President was not ordained to the priesthood office of apostle, but as a holder of all priesthood keys, the authority of apostle was an implied authority of the position.

== Hyrum Smith ==
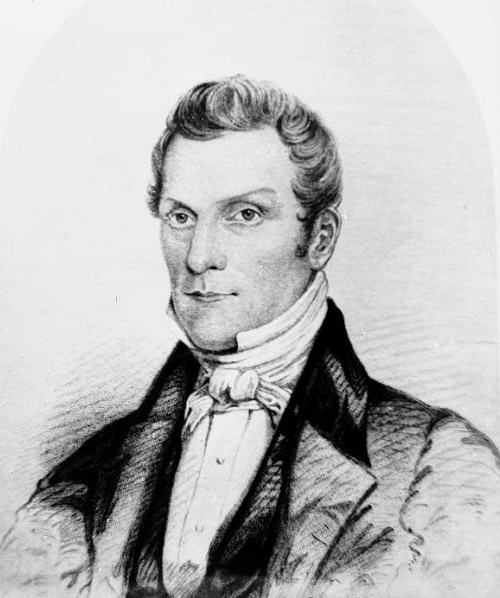
Hyrum Smith, c. 1880–1920

On April 11, 1838, Cowdery was excommunicated from the church by Smith and thereby lost his position as Assistant President. The position went unfilled until January 25, 1841, when Smith ordained his older brother Hyrum to be the Assistant President. This was done in accordance with a revelation that was received by Smith on January 19, which stated:

And from this time forth I appoint unto him [Hyrum] that he may be a prophet, and a seer, and a revelator unto my church, as well as my servant Joseph; That he may act in concert also with my servant Joseph; and that he shall receive counsel from my servant Joseph, who shall show unto him the keys whereby he may ask and receive, and be crowned with the same blessing, and glory, and honor, and priesthood, and gifts of the priesthood, that once were put upon him that was my servant Oliver Cowdery ....

== John C. Bennett ==
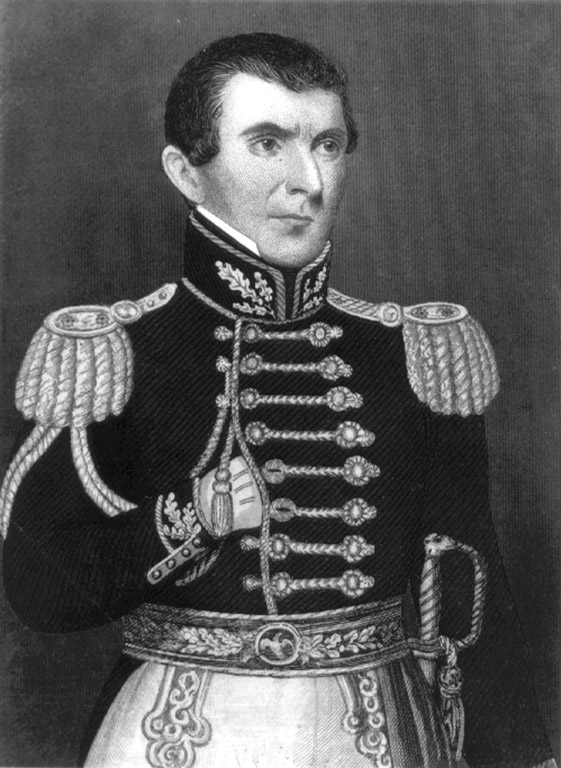
John C. Bennett

On April 8, 1841, Smith appointed John C. Bennett to serve "as Assistant President until President [Sidney] Rigdon's health should be restored." Since Sidney Rigdon was a member of the First Presidency (not the Assistant President) and Hyrum Smith was serving as the Assistant President, it is possible that Bennett's intended role was as a fill-in for Rigdon as a counselor in the First Presidency. The true nature of Bennett's position is further clouded by the fact that he held the position only for approximately one year: he was disfellowshipped from the church and removed from the First Presidency on May 25, 1842.

== Discontinuance ==
Hyrum Smith remained Assistant President of the Church until he and Joseph were killed on June 27, 1844. The death of both the President of the Church and his supposed successor, the Assistant President, helped contribute to the leadership confusion among the Latter Day Saints which led to the succession crisis of 1844. In most of the separate denominations that resulted from the crisis, the position of Assistant President of the Church was discontinued.

In the Church of Jesus Christ of Latter-day Saints, the largest of the Latter Day Saint denominations, the lack of a current Assistant President of the Church has been explained in the following way:

After Oliver Cowdery fell from his high status, Hyrum Smith the Patriarch was chosen by revelation to succeed to the position of Assistant President and to stand as a joint witness with the Prophet [Joseph Smith] of the truth of the restoration. ... When these two joint Presidents of the Church sealed their testimonies with their blood, the full operation of the keys of the kingdom rested with the Twelve, and Brigham Young, the senior apostle, became the ranking officer of the Church. Since the kingdom was then fully established and the two witnesses had left a binding testimony, it was no longer necessary to continue the office of Assistant President. Accordingly, the office is not found in the Church today.

== See also ==
- Chronology of the First Presidency (LDS Church)
