= Priesthood (Community of Christ) =

In Community of Christ, formerly the Reorganized Church of Jesus Christ of Latter Day Saints, priesthood is God's power and authority to minister in the church and to conduct God's business on Earth. Although the church believes that all Christians are called by their gifts and talents to the ministry, priesthood is seen as a particular expression of universal ministry to which all are called. In Community of Christ, both women and men can be ordained to the priesthood. All offices are deemed equal in importance, but the duties and responsibilities of each differ.

For a person to be called to the priesthood for the first time, his or her calling is typically discerned by the pastor of the local congregation. These priesthood calls are approved after review by a Mission Center President and vote of a congregational conference. For certain calls, the discernment will come through other church officials and approval will be voted upon at a Mission Center Conference or World Conference. Once the call has been administratively processed it is presented to the individual called. If that individual accepts the call and is sustained by a conference vote, he or she will be ordained to that office.

== Overview ==
The priesthood comprises two primary orders, the Aaronic Order and the Melchisedec Order. The Aaronic priesthood includes the offices of Deacon, Teacher and Priest.

The Melchisedec Order includes the offices of Elder, Seventy, High Priest, Bishop, Apostle, President and Prophet. Elders serve in both missionary and administrative roles. Congregational pastors often hold the priesthood office of Elder, however, they may be "set apart" as a congregational pastor from almost any priesthood office.

High Priests are known today as "ministers of vision" and collectively comprise the "High Priesthood" of the church. The Evangelist, Bishop, Apostle and Prophet are specialized priesthood offices within the High Priesthood.

The names of the priesthood offices in Community of Christ are similar to those of the Church of Jesus Christ of Latter-day Saints, of which it shares a common 14-year history. However, numerous differences in belief about the duties, calling, authority and organization of priesthood have developed as the two denominations have taken divergent paths since 1844.

== Priesthood Offices ==
In Community of Christ the priesthood consists of two priesthoods, the Aaronic Order and the Melchisedec Order.

=== Aaronic Order ===
The Aaronic Order consists of three priesthood offices. These offices are deacon, teacher, and priest. They hold the "key" to angelic ministry. The ministers of the Aaronic Order are seen as ministers of presence.

==== Deacon ====
A deacon models Jesus as comforter. Part of the ministry of deacons is to watch over the church, visit the homes of members, to teach and preach, care for the physical and social well-being of the church, and to teach and advise people regarding the principles of Disciples' Generous Response. A deacon cares for members and friends in the temporal aspects of life. Deacons are to be sensitive to the spiritual, physical, and temporal needs of all individuals and families.

==== Teacher ====
The teacher models Jesus as peacemaker. Teachers are called to strengthen the membership, see that the church meets often, preach and teach, reconcile those who have taken offense either at another person or the church, and lead people into paths of discipleship. A key attribute of a teacher is the ability to create friendship and to have knowledge of the families within a congregation. A teacher is a shepherd, one who recognizes the life problems that the members face each day. A teacher's relationship with others is one of redemptive love and concern. Teachers are regarded as ministers of reconciliation with special responsibilities to share spiritual counsel and encouragement to members who are experiencing personal conflicts, however, they are not typically professional counselors or certified mediation specialists.

==== Priest ====
A priest models Jesus as friend. Priests minister to families, preach and teach. They can also perform the Sacrament of Baptism, Administer the Sacrament of the Lord's Supper, and Solemnize and perform the Sacrament of Marriage. They may also perform the sacrament of Ordination for those called to the office of deacon, teacher, or priest. They share with the elders the responsibility to explain all things concerning the church to those who have been baptized but yet to be confirmed.

=== Melchisedec Order ===
The Melchisedec Order consists of two main offices and several specialized offices within them. The two main offices are Elder and High Priest. At times the term elder is used to refer to all who are of the Melchisedec Order. In a more specific sense, the office of elder is sometimes viewed as an appendage to the office of high priest. The Melchisedec Order is theologically viewed (and often termed) as being the High Priesthood, but a distinction needs to be made between the High Priesthood and the Quorum of High Priests (see below). Elders (and seventies, see below) are not high priests, and therefore do not belong to the Quorum of High Priests, but are, as members of the Melchisedec priesthood, part of the High Priesthood. The President of the Church is also the President of the High Priesthood, which means that she holds presidency over elders. Other members of the High Priesthood have their own presidents, but are also under the President of the Church by virtue again of her role as President of the entire High Priesthood. Indirectly, the President of the Church also holds presidency over the entire Aaronic priesthood, through the Order of Bishops. Therefore, the President of the Church presides over the entire priesthood of the church, both administratively and spiritually. The Melchisedec Ministers are seen as ministers of mission and vision.

==== Elder ====
Elders are "ministers of mission." Their ministry expresses the mission of the church. While their ministry is direct and tangible it also expresses the deep spiritual ministry of the gospel. The ministers are called to bring people to Christ and baptize those who are ready to commit their lives to Christ. They may ordain people to the offices of the Aaronic Order and to the office of Elder. They also can perform/administer the other sacraments of the church, except for the Sacrament of the Evangelist's Blessing. Elders are called to teach and preach and watch over the church and to visit the homes of members. They may be called to serve in an elder's court.

===== Seventy =====
The priesthood office of Seventy, which alludes to the New Testament account of Jesus' commission of seventy missionaries, is also considered to be an Elder. Part of the function of the Seventy is a missionary role, and they work closely with the Apostle in charge of the field they are in to develop the strategies and resources to implement the missionary task of the church. They are organized into ten (formerly seven, see below) quorums, each quorum is presided over by a president. These presidents make up the Council of Presidents of Seventy and are collectively led by the "Senior President of Seventy," who is one of the principal missionaries and missionary education leaders of the church. The scriptures suggest that the Seventy are in some way equal to the Council of Twelve Apostles, as indicated in Doctrine and Covenants 104:11e. Even more intriguing, the Council of Twelve is sometimes said to be equal of the Presidency. The equality of the seventy to the Twelve, and by virtue of such equality, also the Presidency, is confirmed in 124:4a. The logistics of such equality to the Presidency and the Twelve (as well as the Twelve to the Presidency) is not made plain.

On January 17, 2010, the President-Prophet (see below) of Community of Christ, Stephen M. Veazey, presented a revelation to the church in which the number of quorums of seventy, and presidents of seventy (both of which had always been seven) could now be flexible, based on the needs of the church at any particular time. That revelation was approved on April 14, 2010, and shortly afterwards, it was announced that there would now be ten quorums (and thus ten presidents). This eliminates a logistical issue that existed previously, as the seventy are called to work closely with the Council of Twelve Apostles. For ministerial & missional purposes, the church divides the world into 11 apostolic "fields", each supervised by one apostle (the 12th apostle being the President of the Council and the Director of Field Ministries). The Apostles are regarded as the senior missionary team in the church, but the specific calling of the seventy and the quorums which they belong to, is also missionary work, and so, to some degree, they fall under the direction of the Apostles, however, as there were 11 fields, and seven quorums, there was always some overlap with global coverage which was not efficient. In April 2010, during the World Conference of the Church, it was decided that the church would be reorganized from 11 to 10 fields (with one apostle, in addition to the director of field ministries, having non-geographic based missional responsibilities), and, as a result of that, the quorums of seventy were increased, from seven to ten, to now perfectly align with each apostolic field.

==== High Priest ====
High Priests are regarded as "ministers of vision." They can be called to serve in any of the offices of the priesthood and there are several specialized callings within this office. Collectively the High Priests are the Quorum of the High Priests. It is desired that the pastor or presiding officer of a large well established congregation is a High Priest.

===== Evangelist =====
An Evangelist is a High Priest ordained for special ministries in evangelism and spiritual direction. The "Order of Evangelists" is presided over by the Presiding Evangelist and they are referred to as "ministers of blessing." These High Priests that have been called to this order are ideally free of administrative responsibilities and are to be responsive to the reconciling and redeeming influence of the Holy Spirit in the lives of all. They give parental counsel and advice to the church and confer spiritual blessings. The Evangelist is available to offer a sacred blessing which can assist persons to recognize and touch the divine nature of God that resides within them. By responding to this divine presence, it nurtures and assures persons of their identity and ultimate and eternal worth before God. This blessing is recorded in writing and stored in the archives of the church at its World Headquarters in Independence, Missouri. The Evangelist's Blessing is founded upon a prior practice known as the "patriarchal blessing" (see Sacraments).

Previous to the 1980s, Evangelists were known both as Patriarchs and Evangelists. The name "Patriarch" was dropped when women were first ordained to this office.

===== Bishop =====
A Bishop is a High Priest ordained for special ministry. All bishops belong to the Order of Bishops which guides the church in teaching the principles of Disciples' Generous Response along with the larger understanding of stewardship. They are led by the Presiding Bishopric in providing support, training, and advocacy in empowering Aaronic ministers to respond to their call of ministry. The Presiding Bishopric also hold Presidency over the Aaronic Order. They also serve as judges in church court proceedings. Historically, the Order of Bishops included other bishoprics, particularly at stake levels. Some bishops continue to have financial responsibility for a particular area. For example, mission centers will have a bishop. Nationally, Canada is one of the few countries to have a bishop for the entire nation. There are other bishops in Canada, but they serve in a supporting role to the Bishop of Canada (and may preside over mission centers within Canada).

An interesting fact about the office of bishop is that there is evidence to suggest that it properly belongs to the Aaronic Order. Section 68 of the Doctrine and Covenants states that a literal descendant of Aaron has the right to officiate in this office. However, since it would be difficult to prove such lineage, it is also stated that high priests can be ordained bishops, as they have the right to officiate in all the lesser offices. Individuals ordained as bishops are therefore always high priests, and are therefore considered part of the Melchisedec priesthood. Because of the huge responsibility that is the burden of the Order of Bishops (that of financial administration), it is also, by necessity, generally not viewed as being lesser to the Quorum of High Priests.

In 2008 the Church started appointing field bishops. This is not a new priesthood office, simply a new position being filled by some bishops. They serve as assistants to the apostles, who are being called to lay down administrative responsibilities (as much as possible) in order to have more freedom to be missionaries of Jesus Christ. Field bishops, as assistants to the apostles, will be taking over these administrative tasks.

===== High Councilor =====
This office is mentioned for the sake of completeness and historical reference. Originally, high councilors were considered an office of priesthood, which is confirmed by Doctrine and Covenants Section 129:7b. High Councilors served on either a stake council, or on the Standing High Council. Stake councils have since been abolished, but the Standing High Council is still an official body of the church, providing advice to the First Presidency and being tasked on occasion with drafting official policy statements. It also has some judicial functions. Members of the High Council are no longer ordained as such, but are set apart (and must be high priests). The term high councilor is itself now rarely, if ever, used, except in a historical sense. Section 129 is the most recent section in the Doctrine and Covenants to make reference to the Standing High Council (the actual word "standing" being used only in Section 104).

Although the office (if not the role) seems to no longer be generally viewed as an actual office, the church could reverse this perception if it so wished, as its existence is provided for in church scripture, and it could be argued that since it is a scriptural office of priesthood (as opposed to simply a position held by a priesthood member, such as a pastor) that those who become members of the Standing High Council still serve in a distinct office. Furthermore, Section 17:17 uses the actual words "high councilor", and notes that they, like bishops and high priests, are ordained. This clearly indicates that, contrary to current custom, perception, and terminology, the high councilor is most definitely an actual office of priesthood.

Section 104:15 suggests that this body, like the Seventy, are equal to the Twelve Apostles. Again, the logistics of such is not clear.

===== Apostle =====
The Council of Twelve Apostles is composed of twelve persons who hold the priesthood office of Apostle. Together with the First Presidency and the Presiding Bishopric they comprise the World Church Leadership Council. They are primarily responsible for the church's missionary outreach and field administration. They are called to bear their personal testimonies as a special witness of Jesus Christ and to enable the church to bear its witness as Community of Christ. They administer the work of the church in the field and they oversee the seventies in the area of missionary work. One of the apostles is set apart as president of the council. There are revelations in the Doctrine & Covenants that suggest that the Apostles are, in some sense, equal in authority to the First Presidency itself, but the logistics of such equality are unclear.

For purposes of conducting world church business, the church divides the world into geographic based apostolic "fields". In recent years, there have been eleven such fields (the President of the Council of Twelve concurrently serves as Director of Field Ministries, and does not preside over a field, but often has, in addition to the above roles, responsibility for specific, but non-geographic based forms of missionary work, such as overseeing military chaplains). In April 2010, during the church's World Conference, it was announced that there would be now ten apostolic fields, with a second apostle having non-geographic based missionary responsibilities.

===== President =====
Administratively, there are numerous presidents within the Church, including congregational presidents (pastors), presidents of large jurisdictions of the Church (mission centers), presidents of local priesthood quorums (any quorum of deacons, any quorum of elders, etc.), and presidents of World Church level priesthood quorums (Council of Twelve Apostles, Quorum of High Priests, etc.). However, only members of the highest body of the Church, the Quorum of the First Presidency, are actually ordained to the priesthood office of President. All three members of the First Presidency are thus termed “President X, President Y, President Z”. However, only one of these individuals is the actual president of the Church (and of the quorum itself). To put it simply, all three are presidents by priesthood office, but only one is the administrative and spiritual President of the Church. The other two serve as his or her counselors, and are often informally referred to as such.

The President of the Church is also always President of the High Priesthood and therefore, indirectly of the entire priesthood (the office of elder being viewed as an appendage of the High Priest, and the entire Aaronic Priesthood having as its presidency the Order of Bishops, itself part of the High Priesthood). Additionally, the President of the Church is also concurrently ordained Prophet of the Church (see below). These three roles are perpetually merged; it is not possible to be one without being the other two. It is not entirely clear which (if any) of these three roles are derived from the other(s) but this is simply a question of theological curiosity, and has (thus far) never had any practical relevance as they are all, as stated, perpetually merged.

===== Prophet =====
The President of Community of Christ holds the priesthood office of Prophet. Together with two counselors, they comprise the First Presidency. The prophet-president of Community of Christ is the president of this Quorum, and chooses the other two members of the Presidency to serve as counselors. While all three are charged with presiding over church government, the president has extra responsibilities as prophet, seer, and revelator of the church. This means the prophet-president bears the responsibility of bringing prophetic instruction to the church. The First Presidency are to be the chief interpreters of the Word of God to the church and have ultimate responsibility for church administration.

=== Executive offices ===
In addition to the various offices listed above, there are other positions held by Melchisedec priesthood members that are not generally listed in brief overviews of the church's priesthood, but which do require ordination (as opposed to a prayer of “setting apart”). These include the Presiding Evangelist, the Presiding Bishop, the Counselors to the Presiding Bishop, and the presidents of the Seven Quorums of Seventy; and in some cases president and prophet are also omitted from lists of priesthood office. Thus, “Counselor to the Presiding Bishop” should be considered a full priesthood office, but on account of such a term being rather cumbersome, it is generally avoided. While the above named roles are often overlooked as priesthood offices, the positions themselves are most definitely not obsolete, and do in fact, together with the First Presidency and Council of Twelve Apostles, constitute the leadership of the Church, and the status of each (including president and prophet) as an office of priesthood is confirmed in The Priesthood Manual. All of these positions (except Presidents of Seventy) are specialist offices of the office of high priest. Historically, members of the Standing High Council were also ordained, and known as High Councilors (Doctrine and Covenants, Section 17:17); but current custom seems to support a blessing of setting apart for members of the Standing High Council. They are High Priests belonging to the Quorum of High Priests.

Curiously, the 2004 edition of the Priesthood manual contains conflicting information regarding the Presidents of Seventy. As noted, they are ordained however the same page notes that the Senior President of Seventy is set apart. So, the distinction between the two roles, and the fact that one is ordained, and the other is set apart is clear. Further, it states, under the section regarding High Priests, that Presidents of Seventy are set apart. This statement is made in an overview of the office of High Priest, citing examples of roles filled by high priests, which are set apart instead of ordained. The mention of Presidents of Seventy in this paragraph is itself curious, as Presidents of Seventy are not high priests (although it also mentions pastors, who need not be of any particular priesthood office, so long as they are in the priesthood).

Section 121:5b states: "My servants of the Seventy may select from their number seven; of which number those now being of the seven presidents of Seventy shall be a part; who shall form the presidency of seven presidents of Seventy as provided in my law." The fact that this counsel places the selection of the seven presidents into the hands of the seventy suggests that the role of president of seventy is a position, and not an office, which would therefore not warrant ordination.
