= Council of Twelve Apostles (Community of Christ) =

The Council of Twelve Apostles is one of the governing bodies in the Reorganized Church of Jesus Christ of Latter Day Saints (RLDS) now called the Community of Christ. They are disciples who hold the priesthood office of apostle. It is responsible for the evangelistic witness of the church. Apostles are also high priests in the Melchizedek priesthood of the church.

== Current members ==
The current members of the Council, their specific assignments, and year they joined the Council are as follows:

FIELD 1

Apostle Art Smith (2013) and Apostle Adam Wade (2025)

President of Seventy Leslie Pascua and Mission Support President of Seventy Larry McGuire

Mission Centers in Field 1

- Andhra Pradesh India Mission Centre
- Buripadar India Mission Centre
- Chandragiri India Mission Centre
- Ganjam India Mission Centre
- Kenduguda India Mission Centre
- Mohana India Mission Centre
- South India Green Valley Mission Centre
- Nepal Mission Centre
- East Asia Mission Area
- Philippines Mission Center
- Centre de mission de la Polynésie Française
- Centre de mission d'Haiti Grand Nord
- Centre de mission d'Haiti Grand Sud

FIELD 2

Apostle Carlos Enrique Mejia (2007) and Apostle Angela Ramirez (2023)

President of Seventy Humberto Rosario and Hispanic Leadership Support President of Seventy John Glaser

Mission Centers in Field 2

- Centro de Misión de Brasil
- Centro de Misión del Caribe
- Centro de Misión de Centroamérica
- Centro de Misión de República Dominicana
- Centro de Misión México-Texas
- Centro de Misión del Noroeste de Suramérica
- Centro de Misión del Cono Sur de Suramérica

Field 3

Apostle Catherine Mambwe (2019) and Apostle Matt Frizzell (2025)

President of Seventy Sylvester Ocheing and Mission Support President of Seventy Larry McGuire

Mission Centers in Field 3

- Centre de mission de Congo Ouest Kinshasa en République Démocratique du Congo
- Centre de mission de Côte D’Ivoire & Togo
- Centre de mission de Kashobwe, Kilwa, & Pweto en République Démocratique du Congo
- Centre de mission de Kipushi, Lubumbashi, & Kasenga en République Démocratique du Congo
- Centre de mission de Lualaba en République Démocratique du Congo
- Centre de mission de Tanganyika & Haut Lomami en République Démocratique du Congo
- Centre de mission du Grand Kasaï en République Démocratique du Congo
- Kenya Mission Centre
- Liberia & Sierra Leone Mission Center
- Malawi Mission Centre
- Nigeria Mission Centre
- Zambia, Zimbabwe & South Africa Mission Centre

Field 4

Apostle Lachlan Mackay (2016) and Apostle Shannon McAdam (2025)

Presidents of Seventy Karin Peter and Joelle Wight and Hispanic Leadership Support President of Seventy John Glaser

Mission Centers in Field 4

- All Nations Congregation
- Australia Mission Centre
- British Isles Mission Centre
- Canada East Mission Centre
- Canada West Mission Centre
- Eurasia Mission Centre
- First People Congregation
- Pacific Island Mission Centre
- Western Europe Mission Centre

Field 5

Apostles Kat Hnatyshyn (2025), Richard James (2013), Carrie Welch (2025), Joey Williams (2025) with support from Lachlan Mackay and Shannon McAdam

Presidents of Seventy Karin Peter and Joelle Wight and Hispanic Leadership Support President of Seventy John Glaser

Mission Centers in Field 5

- Alabama - Northwest Florida USA Mission Center
- Arizona USA Mission Center
- Ark-La-Tex USA Mission Center
- Bountiful USA Mission Center
- Brush Creek USA Mission Center
- Cedar Valley-Nauvoo USA Mission Center
- Central Missouri USA Mission Center
- Central USA Mission Center
- Chesapeake Bay USA Mission Center
- Chicago USA Mission Center
- Coastal Bend USA Mission Center
- Eastern Great Lakes USA Mission Center
- Far West USA Mission Center
- Florida USA Mission Center
- Gateway USA Mission Center
- Greater Pacific Northwest USA Mission Center
- Gulf USA Mission Center
- Headwaters USA Mission Center
- Heart of Texas USA Mission Center
- Inland West USA Mission Center
- Kentucky-Indiana USA Mission Center
- Lamoni Heartland USA Mission Center
- Michigan USA Mission Center
- Mid-Atlantic USA Mission Center
- Midlands USA Mission Center
- Mid-South USA Mission Center
- New England USA Mission Center
- Oklahoma USA Mission Center
- Pacific Southwest International Mission Center
- Prairie Bluffs USA Mission Center
- Rio Grande USA Mission Center
- Rocky Mountain USA Mission Center
- Sierra Pacific USA Mission Center
- South Central States USA Mission Center
- Southeast USA Mission Center
- Western Ohio USA Mission Center

== 1844 to present ==
This is a list of the members of the Council in the Community of Christ, (formerly the Reorganized Church of Jesus Christ of Latter Day Saints) ordained after 1844. The dates are the years they served as a member of the Council of Twelve.

Name	Began Service	Ended Service	Cause of Departure	Other Positions	Nationality & Notes
Jason W. Briggs	1853	1885	Not sustained as Apostle at the 1885 conference.	President of the Council of Twelve Apostles	American. Withdrew from the church sometime after 1885 conference
Zenas H. Gurley, Sr.	1853	1871			Ordained Joseph Smith III as president in 1860.
Henry Harrison Deam	1853	1854			
Reuben Newkirk	1853	1873			
John Cunningham	1853	1855			
George White	1853	1859			
Daniel B. Rasey	1853	1873			
Samuel Powers	1855	1873			
David Newkirk	1855	1865			
William W. Blair	1858	10 April 1873	Called to First Presidency	First counselor in the First Presidency	American. Served as first counselor until his death on 18 April 1896
John Shippy	1860	1868			
James Blakeslee	1860	1866			
Edmund C. Briggs	October 1860	18 April 1902	Ordained as Evangelist/Patriarch.	President of the Seventy	American
Josiah Ells	1865	1885			
Charles Derry	1865	1870			
William H. Kelley	1873	1913		President of the Council of Twelve Apostles (1897– )	
Thomas Wood Smith	1873	1894			
James Caffall	1873	1902			
John H. Lake	1873	1902			
Alexander Hale Smith	10 April 1873	12 April 1897	Ordained a Presiding Patriarchs/Evangelist.	Counselor to Joseph Smith III; President of the Council of Twelve Apostles (1890–97)	American. Third surviving son of Joseph and Emma Smith.
Zenas H. Gurley, Jr.	1874	1885			
Joseph R. Lambert	1873	1902			
James W. Gillen	11 April 1887	1899			
Heman C. Smith	11 April 1887	1909		Church Historian	
Joseph Luff	11 April 1887	1909			Canadian
Gomer T. Griffiths	11 April 1887	1922			
Isaac N. White	12 April 1897	1913			
John W. Wight	12 April 1897	1913			
R. C. Evans	12 April 1897	1902	Ordained as counselor in the First Presidency	Counselor in the First Presidency Bishop (With specific jurisdiction over the church in Canada)	Canadian. Broke with the church in 1918 and formed the Church of the Christian Brotherhood
Peter Andersen	1901	1920			
Frederick A. Smith	1902	1913			
Francis M. Sheehy	1902	1920			
Ulysses W. Greene	1902	1922			
Cornelius A. Butterworth	1901	1922			
John W. Rushton	1902	1947			
James F. Curtis	1909	7 April 1938	Honorably released		
Robert C. Russell	1909	1922			
James E. Kelley	1913	1917			
William Murray Aylor	1913	1922			
Paul M. Hanson	1913	8 October 1958			
James A. Gillen	1913	1934		President of the Council of Twelve Apostles (1922– )	
Thomas W. Williams	1920	1925			
Myron A. McConley	1920	1948			
Clyde F. Ellis	1923	1945			
John F. Garver	13 October 1922	9 April 1946	Ordained as counselor in the First Presidency	Counselor in the First Presidency	American. Was president of the Board of Trustees for Graceland College
Daniel T. Williams	1922	8 October 1958	Ordained as Patriarch/Evangelist		
F. Henry Edwards	13 October 1922	9 April 1946	Ordained as counselor in the First Presidency	Secretary of the Council of Twelve Apostles	English. Honorably released from First Presidency on 18 April 1966,
Edmund J. Gleazer	1922	8 October 1958	Ordained as Patriarch/Evangelist		
Roy S. Budd	1922	1936			
George G. Lewis	1932	1948			
George C. Mesley	7 April 1938	1954			
Arthur Alma Oakman	7 April 1938	1964	Ordained an Evangelist	Evangelist	English
Charles R. Hield	7 April 1938	6 April 1964	Honorably released		
D. Blair Jensen	1946	18 April 1966	Honorably released		
Roscoe E. Davey	1947	6 April 1964	Ordained as Patriarch/Evangelist		
Maurice L. Draper	1947	8 October 1958	Ordained as counselor in the First Presidency		
W. Wallace Smith	1947	1950	Ordained as counselor in the First Presidency	Prophet-President	
Percy E. Farrow	1948	18 April 1966	Honorably released		
Reed M. Holmes	1948	1 April 1974.	Ordained as Presiding Patriarch/Evangelist		
Donald O. Chesworth	1950	14 April 1972.	Ordained as Patriarch/Evangelist		
Donald Victor Lents	1954	8 April 1980	Ordained as Evangelist/Patriarch		
Charles D. Neff	8 October 1958	5 April 1984	Honorably released		American
Clifford A. Cole	8 October 1958	8 April 1980	Called to ministries of teaching and writing		
Cecil R. Ettinger	2 April 1960	1 April 1974	Honorably released		
Duane E. Couey	2 April 1960	18 April 1966	Ordained counselor in the First Presidency	Presiding Patriarch/Evangelist	American
Russell F. Ralston	6 April 1964	29 March 1976			
William E. Timms	6 April 1964	3 April 1978	Ordained as Evangelist/Patriarch		
Earl T. Higdon	18 April 1966	1 April 1974	Honorably released	President of Graceland College	
Alan D. Tyree	18 April 1966	29 March 1982	Ordained counselor in the First Presidency		
Aleah G. Koury	18 April 1966	8 April 1980	Ordained as Evangelist/Patriarch		Canadian
Howard S. Sheehy, Jr.	1 April 1968	1980	Ordained counselor in the First Presidency	Counselor in the First Presidency	American. Ordained counselor on 3 April 1978, but remained as a member of the Council of Twelve Apostles until 1980.
John C. Stuart	14 April 1972	29 March 1982	Ordained as Evangelist/Patriarch		
William T. Higdon	1 April 1974	5 April 1992		President of Graceland College	
Lloyd B. Hurshman	1 April 1974	14 April 1988	Honorably released		
Paul W. Booth	1 April 1974	5 April 1992	Ordained as the Presiding Evangelist		
Eugene C. Austin, Sr.	29 March 1976	10 April 1994	Honorably released		
Roy H. Schaefer	3 April 1978	14 April 1988	Honorably released		
Phillip M. Caswell	3 April 1978	1998			
Kisuke Sekine	8 April 1980	5 April 1992	Honorably released		Japanese
Everett S. Graffeo	8 April 1980	1994	Ordained as the Presiding Evangelist		
Kenneth N. Robinson	8 April 1980	1996	Ordained counselor in the First Presidency	Counselor in the First Presidency	Australian
Joe A. Serig	29 March 1982	1998			
James C. Cable	29 March 1982	1996			
Geoffrey F. Spencer	5 April 1984	10 April 1994	Honorably released		Australian
A. Alex Kahtava	14 April 1988	2002			Canadian
John P. Kirkpatrick	14 April 1988	2007			
David R. Brock	5 April 1992	27 March 2007	Ordained as the Presiding Evangelist	President of Seventy; Presiding Evangelist	American
Lawrence W. Tyree	5 April 1992	2002			
Stephen M. Veazey	5 April 1992	2005	Ordained as the Prophet-President	President of the Council of Twelve Prophet-President	American
Danny A. Belrose	10 April 1994	2000	Ordained as Presiding Evangelist		Canadian
Dale E. Luffman	10 April 1994	January 3, 2013			American
Kenneth L. McLaughlin	10 April 1994	2005			
Peter A. Judd	1996	2000	Ordained counselor in the First Presidency	Counselor in the First Presidency	English
James E. Slauter	1996	May 3, 2011	Early retirement, family health	President of the Council of Twelve Apostles; Secretary of the Council of Twelve Apostles	American
Gail E. Mengel	31 March 1998	2005	Called as Ecumenical and Interfaith Officer	President of Church Women United Ecumenical and Interfaith Officer	American, along with Linda L. Booth, the first women to be ordained apostles.
Linda L. Booth	1998	2019		President of the Council of Twelve Apostles, Director of Communications	American, along with Gail E. Mengel, the first woman to be ordained apostles. Also first female president of the Council of Twelve.
Leonard M. Young	April 2000	2010	Ordained an Evangelist in 2010	President of the Quorum of High Priests, President of Michigan Region, Director of Field Resources	American - Served as World Church Parliamentarian from 1988 to 2020
Bunda C. Chibwe	April 2000	present		President of the Sixth Quorum of Seventy	Zambian
Mary Jacks Dynes	2002	2010	Retired	President of the Fifth Quorum of Seventy.	American
David D. Schaal	2002	2005	Ordained counselor in the First Presidency	President of the Tri Stake Mission Center Counselor in the First Presidency	American
Stassi D. Cramm	2005	2016	Ordained counselor in the First Presidency and Presiding Bishop	Counselor to the Presiding Bishop; Presiding Bishop; Counselor in the First Presidency	American
Ronald D. Harmon Jr.	2005	2023	Ordained to Office of Presiding Bishop	President of the Council of Twelve Apostles	American
Rick W. Maupin	2005	2019			American
Susan D. Oxley	2005	2015			American
Andrew Bolton	2007	2016			English
Carlos Enrique Mejia	2007	present			Honduran
Richard C.N. James	2010	present		Secretary of the Council of Twelve Apostles (incumbent)	Welsh
K. Scott Murphy	2010	2013	Ordained counselor in the First Presidency	Director of Field Ministries (incumbent); President of the Council of Twelve	American
Barbara L. Carter	2013	2023			American
Mareva Arnaud Tchong	2013	2025		President of the Council of Twelve Apostles	French Polynesian (Tahitian)
Arthur E. Smith	2013	present			Canadian
Janné C. Grover	2016	2025			American
Robin K. Linkhart	2016	2025			American
Lachlan E. Mackay	2016	present			American
Catherine Mambwe	2019	present			Zambian
David Nii	2019	2025			American
Shandra Karine Newcom	2023	2025			American
Angela Alt. Ramirez de Hernandez	2023	present			Dominican
Carrie Welch	2025	present			American
Joey Williams	2025	present			American
Adam Wade	2025	present			Australian
Matt Frizzell	2025	present			American
Kat Hnatyshyn	2025	present			American
Shannon McAdam	2025	present			Canadian
