= Wallace B. Smith =

Leader of the RLDS Church (1978–1996)

Prophet Emeritus
- April 15, 1996 – September 22, 2023

Prophet–President of the Church
- April 5, 1978 – April 15, 1996
- Predecessor: W. Wallace Smith
- Successor: W. Grant McMurray
- Reason: Designated successor by W. Wallace Smith
- End reason: Granted emeritus status

Prophet and President Designate
- 1976 – April 5, 1978
- Called by: W. Wallace Smith
- Predecessor: none
- Reason: To assist the Prophet-President
- End reason: Became Prophet–President of the Church

Personal details
- Born: Wallace Bunnell Anthony Smith; July 29, 1929; Independence, MO, U.S.
- Died: September 22, 2023 (aged 94); Lee's Summit, Missouri, U.S.
- Residence: Independence Missouri
- Spouse(s): Anne Smith
- Children: 3
- Parents: W. Wallace Smith; Rosamund Bunnell Smith

Wallace Bunnell Smith (July 29, 1929 – September 22, 2023) was an American who was Prophet-President of the Reorganized Church of Jesus Christ of Latter Day Saints (RLDS) (Community of Christ), from April 5, 1978, through April 15, 1996. The son of W. Wallace Smith, he was designated as his father’s successor in 1976 and ordained church president in 1978, when his father retired to emeritus status. Wallace B. Smith was a great-grandson of Joseph Smith (founder of the Latter Day Saint movement), and was a practicing ophthalmologist in the Independence, Missouri, area before accepting ordination to RLDS leadership.

As president, Smith authorized construction of the church’s temple in Independence, Missouri, which occurred from 1990 to 1994. His presidency also promoted a church conference vote on April 5, 1984, which approved ordination of women to priesthood offices: The first ordination took place on November 17, 1985. Smith is credited with being one of the first church leaders to formally propose a name-change for the church, at a Joint Council retreat in 1994. At the subsequent World Conference in 1996, the proposed name change (to "Community of Christ" from "Reorganized Church of Jesus Christ of Latter Day Saints") was not approved by a majority vote, but conference approval did take place during the April 2000 World Conference, four years after Smith's retirement as the church's prophet-president.

On September 19, 1995, Smith announced he was retiring as prophet, seer and revelator of the church, and designated W. Grant McMurray as his successor. Smith formally retired on April 15, 1996, at which time his successor McMurray was ordained in a ceremony at the RLDS Auditorium. Smith was designated "President Emeritus," as his father likewise had been designated in 1978 upon ordination of his son.

Wallace B. Smith died on September 22, 2023, at the age of 94.

== Sources ==
- Vanel, Chrystal (2010). "The History of the RLDS Church/Community of Christ in France". John Whitmer Historical Association Journal. 30: 206–221. JSTOR 43200480.

Community of Christ titles
Preceded by W. Wallace Smith	President Emeritus; April 15, 1996 – September 22, 2023; With: W. Wallace Smith	Succeeded by N/A
Preceded by W. Wallace Smith	Prophet–President; April 5, 1978 – April 15, 1996	Succeeded by W. Grant McMurray
