= Stassi D. Cramm =

Prophet-President of Community of Christ

Stassi D. Cramm is the Prophet-President of the Community of Christ. She is the ninth person to fill the role, and her tenure marks the first time that a woman has headed the denomination.

Cramm was born on June 3, 1962 and was raised in Illinois. She graduated from the University of Illinois, Champaign-Urbana with a BS in engineering, then earned an MA in organizational management from the University of Phoenix, an MA in religion from the Community of Christ Seminary at Graceland University, and a PhD in organization and management from Capella University. Cramm worked as a flight test engineer for the United States Air Force. She is married to consulting engineer Stephen Andrew Cramm, with whom she has 2 children, a daughter who is a surgeon and a son who is a software engineer.

Cramm was set apart as a priest in 1987, and has been working for the church since then, including overseeing the church's finances and as a member of the Council of Twelve Apostles. She has served on the Board of Trustees of Graceland University since 2016, which is operated by the church, and served as dean of the seminary. In 2016 she also became the first woman presiding bishop of the church.

In 2024 it was announced that she had been called to the role of Prophet-President, and would be the first woman to take the position since the Community of Christ began ordaining women to the priesthood in 1984. She was ordained as the Community of Christ’s first female Prophet-President on June 1, 2025.
