= Frederick M. Smith =

Prophet-President of the Reorganized Church of Jesus Christ of Latter Day Saints

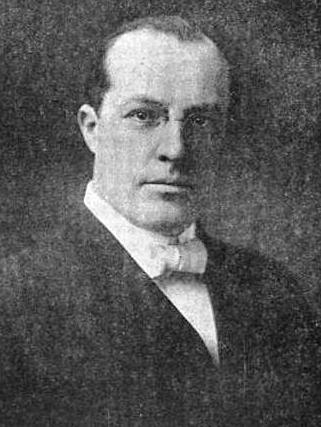

Prophet–President of the Church
- May 5, 1915 – March 20, 1946
- Predecessor: Joseph Smith III
- Successor: Israel A. Smith
- Reason: Doctrine of Lineal succession

Counselor in the First Presidency
- April 18, 1902 – May 5, 1915
- Called by: Joseph Smith III
- Predecessor: William W. Blair
- Successor: Floyd M. McDowell
- Reason: Death of William W. Blair
- End reason: Became Prophet–President of the Church

Personal details
- Born: Frederick Madison Smith; January 21, 1874; Plano, Illinois, U.S.
- Died: March 20, 1946 (aged 72); Independence, Missouri, U.S.
- Resting place: Mound Grove Cemetery; 39°06′43.31″N 94°25′37.05″W
- Education: BA–Graceland College; MA–University of Kansas; PhD–Clark University
- Spouse(s): Ruth Lyman Cobb Smith
- Children: 2
- Parents: Joseph Smith III; Bertha Madison Smith
- Website: Frederick M. Smith

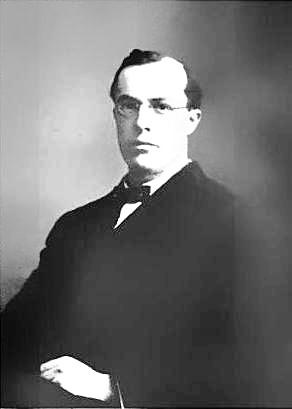
Frederick M. Smith

Frederick Madison Smith (January 21, 1874 – March 20, 1946), generally known among his followers as "Fred M.", was an American religious leader and author and the third Prophet-President of the Reorganized Church of Jesus Christ of Latter Day Saints (renamed the Community of Christ in 2001), serving from 1915 until his death.

Smith's paternal grandfather was Joseph Smith Jr., the founder of the Latter Day Saint movement, and his father was Joseph Smith III, the first president after the Church's "Reorganization." The first graduate of Graceland University, Fred M. earned a PhD in psychology from Clark University in 1916, setting him apart as one of the most highly educated members of his church at the time.

Smith's leadership was controversial. One biographer has called him "a man of paradox" and "one of the most controversial figures in Reorganization history." His presidency saw the church initiate a series of major projects, but it was also marred by the controversy over what became known as "Supreme Directional Control."

== Biography ==
Fred M. was one of nine children of Joseph Smith III and his second wife, Bertha Madison Smith. He was born on January 21, 1874, at Plano, Illinois, and baptized on July 20, 1883.

Summary of education:

- 1895 educated at Iowa City Academy
- 1896 University of Iowa
- 1898 BA from Graceland College — the first graduate of this college
- 1911 MA from the University of Kansas
- 1916 PhD from Clark University

On August 3, 1897, Smith married Alice Lyman Cobb (died May 4, 1926).

== Succession to the presidency ==
Fred M. Smith became a counselor in the RLDS Church's First Presidency in 1902. As his father's health declined, Fred M. assumed greater and greater responsibilities in the management of the church and its auxiliary institutions. Joseph Smith III died on December 10, 1914, and Fred M. was ordained as the new Prophet-President the following spring on May 5, 1915.

== Zion and the social gospel ==
Smith was known for his interests in applying the principles of the newly emerging fields of sociology and social welfare to the Church's thinking on the principles and doctrine of Zion. Smith was influenced by the contemporary Social Gospel movement, which endeavored to apply Christian ethics to societal problems, including social justice, health care, and care for the poor, for orphans, and the elderly. In broad terms, Smith felt the need to address these issues as part of the overall call to "build Zion." In this way he both embraced and modernized his grandfather Joseph Smith Jr.'s vision to build a literal city of Zion in Independence, Missouri.

In order to fulfill his vision, Smith initiated a number of ambitious programs, including the construction of the Auditorium, expansion of the Independence Sanitarium (later known as Independence Regional Health Center), construction of an old-age home in Independence originally known as "Resthaven" (now "the Groves"), and a planned agricultural cooperative in Atherton, Missouri.

As part of his modernizing program, Smith was an early adopter of radio. In 1924, the RLDS Church's radio station, known as KFIX (later KLDS), became the first church-owned radio station in the United States to be licensed.

He also presided during the difficult depression years which stalled or halted many of his projects, as the church faced issues of major financial debt.

== Supreme directional control ==
He became embroiled in a controversy over Supreme Directional Control, regarding leadership and financial control of the church. The dispute led to a significant loss in membership due to the formation of splinter sects by those opposed to the policy. Smith became the first president of the church to submit a notice of resignation. However, the General Conference to which he submitted his resignation, refused to accept it.

He died in 1946, and was succeeded by his brother, Israel Alexander Smith.

The Frederick Madison Smith Library is one of two libraries belonging to Graceland University, and is located on their Lamoni campus. It opened in 1966.

Community of Christ titles
Preceded by Joseph Smith III	Prophet–President; May 5, 1915–March 20, 1946	Succeeded by Israel A. Smith
Preceded by William W. Blair	Counselor in the First Presidency; April 18, 1902–May 5, 1915	Succeeded by Floyd M. McDowell
