= World Conference (Community of Christ) =

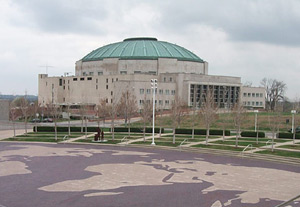
The Community of Christ auditorium

World Conference is the highest legislative body in Community of Christ and is empowered to act for the entire church. It operates according to a principle known as "common consent" and is presided over by the First Presidency. The functioning of the councils, quorums and orders of the church are also considered an important part of the World Conference.

Delegates to the conference are elected by Mission Center conferences. Motions are often debated vigorously and the results are sometimes close and controversial. World Conferences are traditionally held at Community of Christ World Headquarters, with the legislative and main worship services held in the Auditorium in Independence, Missouri.

== History ==
World Conferences were originally known as "General Conferences." The first General Conference of the church, then known as the Church of Christ, was held on June 9, 1830—only two months after its organization. Convened in Fayette, New York, it was presided over by Joseph Smith. The conference included a gathering of the 27 members of the church.

Originally held semiannually, or as need arose, the church switched to an annual meeting in the late-nineteenth century. With many members desiring to meet more than once a year, summer gatherings were held, starting in 1883, as reunions (a tradition that continues). In the twentieth century, the church decided to meet biannually. Then, at the 2007 World Conference, it was decided that World Conferences would be held tri-annually. Switching to a conference every three years, instead of every two, was anticipated to be less taxing on church resources, and to provide for greater participation by members who reside abroad.

The most recent World Conferences were held April 2023 and then beginning late May 2025.

== Agenda and format ==
The World Conference Opening Ceremonies traditionally include a ceremony featuring the flags of the nations where the church is organized and often include a welcome address by a featured speaker from another denomination, as well as welcomes by local elected officials. The councils, quorums and orders of the church hold separate meetings during World Conference as do several delegate caucuses. The usual agenda calls for these meetings during weekday mornings, with most of the general legislative sessions of the World Conference in the afternoon. Evening worship services often include a contemporary worship service, an outreach service, and a service in which the President of Community of Christ addresses the church in an important address that sets the agenda and tone, not only for the conference, but for the work of the church in the coming years. A group of communion services are usually held on the Sunday morning of the conference, including a very large and well-coordinated service held in the Auditorium, which is regarded by many as one of the highlights of the World Conference. Worship services feature the Auditorium Organ and the Temple Organ. Organ recitals are typically held during the lunch break following the Daily Prayer for Peace. On occasion, the Community of Christ International Peace Award has been presented during a World Conference.

== Organization and management ==
The Conference Organization and Procedures Committee normally submits the rules and procedures to be followed at a particular conference. The conference manager attends to the logistics of the conference while the World Church Secretary serves as the legislative clerk. Voting is by a show of hands, however on close votes when the chair is in doubt, votes are counted by delegation and apportioned based on the relative membership of each mission center/jurisdiction. This rather complex voting procedure is designed to protect the voting rights of international delegations that may not have been able to recruit a full slate of delegates to represent them in the conference.

Delegates attend from a majority of the fifty nations where the church is organized. The largest numbers of delegates are from the United States, Canada and French Polynesia. Translators for more than a dozen languages sit overhead the main conference floor and present real time translations of the conference to any of the delegates on the floor who prefer to participate in a language other than English. Numbered lecterns in the conference chamber are available to those who wish to speak. They gain the floor to make motions or speak by submitting a card to a computer attendant at the lectern who enters the request into a queue. In this fashion, the presiding officer is able to call upon speakers with alternating pro and con viewpoints, as well as give preference to priority motions. According to church bylaws Roberts Rules of Order Newly Revised is the parliamentary authority for the conference except where they may be in conflict with the bylaws, adopted rules of order for the conference, and past resolutions. Great deference is normally shown by most delegates to the President of the church in regards to the management of the agenda and debate, however, controversial issues are sometimes brought to the conference, thoughtfully considered from many viewpoints, and may be decided by close or split votes.

== Main order of business ==
The usual items of business that come before the conference are votes to sustain leadership, approve priesthood calls to major offices, elect the Board of Trustees of Graceland University, elect the World Church Finance Board, set the budget for the church, approve legislative resolutions and set the dates for the next conference. When an inspired document is presented to the church by the prophet-president, its consideration and the decision of whether or not to include it in the Doctrine and Covenants becomes the primary matter of reflection for the body.

== See also ==
- General Conference (LDS Church)
