= Chronology of Presiding Patriarchs (LDS Church) =

List of Presiding Patriarchs in the LDS Church

Originally, the office of Presiding Patriarch was one of the highest and most important offices of the church's priesthood. When a Presiding Patriarch has existed, the church has sustained the person as a prophet, seer, and revelator. In the history of the LDS Church, there have been eight Presiding Patriarchs, three Acting Presiding Patriarchs, and one Patriarch Emeritus.

From 4 February 1932 until 1937 the office was officially left vacant; two patriarchs, Nicholas G. Smith and Frank B. Woodbury, who were not direct descendants of Joseph Smith Sr. and not sustained to their positions in general conference, fulfilled the duties normally performed by the Presiding Patriarch between 1932 and 1937. It is unknown whether they were ordained or set apart as Acting Presiding Patriarchs.

The Church of Jesus Christ of Latter-day Saints (LDS Church) effectively discontinued the office of Presiding Patriarch in 1979, indicating that enough local patriarchs existed so that the church-wide position was no longer needed. Until that time, the role and duties of the office had varied. The Presiding Patriarch sometimes appointed local patriarchs in the stakes of the church and presided over them as a loose "Quorum of Patriarchs." Like the local patriarchs, the Presiding Patriarch was also empowered to give patriarchal blessings.

== 1830s ==
18 December 1833
The first Presiding Patriarch was Joseph Smith Sr., father of the movement's founder, Joseph Smith Jr. The elder Smith was ordained to the office by his son on December 18, 1833 in Kirtland, Ohio.

== 1840s ==
Summer of 1840
When the Joseph Smith Sr. was on his deathbed, he ordained his then living eldest son, Hyrum Smith, to succeed him in the office by right of lineal succession.

14 September 1840
Joseph Smith Sr. dies and Hyrum Smith became Presiding Patriarch.

27 June 1844
When Hyrum was assassinated with his brother Joseph.

24 May 1845
The only surviving brother of Joseph and Hyrum Smith, William Smith asserted his lineal right to the Patriarchate. William was ordained to the office by senior apostle Brigham Young on 24 May 1845

19 October 1845
William Smith was excommunicated from the church by Brigham Young for apostasy. After joining himself with a rival faction of the church, led by James J. Strang, William was sustained as Presiding Patriarch for the Church of Jesus Christ of Latter Day Saints (Strangite). He later left Strang's organization and asserted his own claim to be successor by right of lineal succession to the President of the Church (after joining himself with other factions for short periods of times).

1 January 1849
Brigham Young called John Smith, a brother of Joseph Smith Sr. known as "Uncle John", to be Presiding Patriarch of the Church of Jesus Christ of Latter-day Saints. John Smith served from 1847 until his death in 1854.

== 1850s ==
23 May 23, 1854
John Smith dies
18 February 1855
John Smith was succeeded by Hyrum's son, John Smith, who was ordained in 1855 and served until his death in 1911.

== 1910s ==
6 November 1911
John Smith (Hyrum's son) dies
9 May 1912
Hyrum G. Smith, grandson of John Smith and Great-grandson of Hyrum Smith, was ordained as Presiding Patriarch.

== 1930s ==
4 February 1932
Hyrum G. Smith dies
4 February 1932
Nicholas G. Smith begins to serve as de facto Acting Presiding Patriarch
1934
Nicholas G. Smith ends his service and Frank B. Woodbury begins his service as de facto Acting Presiding Patriarch
October 8, 1937
Frank B. Woodbury ends his service as de facto Acting Presiding Patriarch
October 8, 1937
George F. Richards, a member of the Quorum of the Twelve Apostles, was officially called, sustained, and set apart to the office of Acting Presiding Patriarch. Like Nicholas Smith and Woodbury, Richards was not a descendant of Joseph Smith Sr., and therefore had no right to the Patriarchate based on descent. It is for this reason that he was considered to be merely "acting" in the capacity of Presiding Patriarch.

== 1940s-2013 ==
8 October 1942
George F. Richards was released from his duties as Acting Patriarch and church president Heber J. Grant called Joseph Fielding Smith to be the Presiding Patriarch. Smith was the son of apostle Hyrum M. Smith and a grandson of his namesake, former church president Joseph F. Smith, who himself was the son of Hyrum. Therefore, the new Presiding Patriarch qualified as a direct descendant of Joseph Smith Sr. However, this was nevertheless the first time since the call of "Uncle John" that the church had departed from the practice of father-to-son or father-to-grandson lineal succession, for Joseph Fielding Smith was not a descendant of Hyrum G. Smith, who was in 1942 the most recent Presiding Patriarch that was not considered to be merely acting in the calling.
6 October 1946
Joseph Fielding Smith was released from the position of Presiding Patriarch in 1946 by church president George Albert Smith. D. Michael Quinn has assert the release was based upon a gay relationship with another Latter-day Saint man. This interpretation of the relationship is highly disputed, reviewers stating the Quinn's book includes "...a bewildering array of same-gender behaviors, most of which have no homosexual component whatsoever...."

10 April 1947
The church returned to the practice of father-to-son lineal succession by calling Hyrum G. Smith's son, Eldred G. Smith, to the office of Presiding Patriarch.
4 October 1979
In 1979, the First Presidency announced that Eldred G. Smith had been honorably released and designated Patriarch Emeritus because, it said, every stake had its own patriarch. This administrative action has effectively discontinued the office within the LDS Church.
April 4, 2013
Eldred G. Smith died. Had the church filled the position by continuing the practice of father-to-son lineal succession, Eldred's son, E. Gary Smith, would have become Patriarch to the Church. The LDS Church has not stated directly whether it will ever appoint a new Presiding Patriarch, though after Smith's death an official magazine of the church described him as "the last person to hold the position". Gary Smith co-authored a book expressing his agreement with the necessity and inevitability of the elimination of the office, and believes the church has discontinued the office in part because of its discomfort with an inherited position.

== Chart of the Presiding Patriarchs ==
Dates	Presiding Patriarch	Notes
18 December 1833 – 14 September 1840	Joseph Smith Sr.	Father of Joseph Smith Jr.
14 September 1840 – 27 June 1844	Hyrum Smith	Oldest surviving son of Joseph Smith Sr.
24 May 1845 – 19 October 1845	William Smith	Oldest surviving son of Joseph Smith Sr.
1 January 1849 – 23 May 1854	John Smith	"Uncle John"; brother of Joseph Smith Sr.
18 February 1855 – 6 November 1911	John Smith	Son of Hyrum Smith
9 May 1912 – 4 February 1932	Hyrum G. Smith	Grandson of John Smith, previous presiding patriarch; great-grandson of Hyrum Smith
4 February 1932 – 1934	Nicholas G. Smith (de facto Acting Presiding Patriarch)	Son of apostle John Henry Smith; grandson of apostle George A. Smith; great-grandson of former presiding patriarch "Uncle" John Smith; was never officially called, set apart, or sustained as the Acting Presiding Patriarch, but carried out the functions of the office
1934 – October 8, 1937	Frank B. Woodbury (de facto Acting Presiding Patriarch)	Unrelated to Smith family; was never officially called, set apart, or sustained as the Acting Presiding Patriarch, but carried out the functions of the office
October 8, 1937 – 8 October 1942	George F. Richards (Acting Presiding Patriarch)	Unrelated to Smith family; unlike Nicholas G. Smith and Frank B. Woodbury, was officially called, set apart, and sustained as the Acting Presiding Patriarch
8 October 1942 – 6 October 1946	Joseph Fielding Smith	Great-grandson of Hyrum Smith; not a descendant of previous presiding patriarch Hyrum G. Smith; released by church president George Albert Smith amid reports of homosexual activity. Restored to "priesthood status" in 1957.
10 April 1947 – 4 October 1979	Eldred G. Smith	Son of former Presiding Patriarch Hyrum G. Smith; great-great-grandson of Hyrum Smith. Patriarch emeritus from 4 October 1979 to his death on 4 April 2013.
Position abolished

== See also ==
- Patriarchal Priesthood
- Chronology of the First Presidency (LDS Church)
- Chronology of the Quorum of the Twelve Apostles (LDS Church)
