= John Smith (nephew of Joseph Smith) =

Fifth Presiding Patriarch of The Church of Jesus Christ of Latter-day Saints

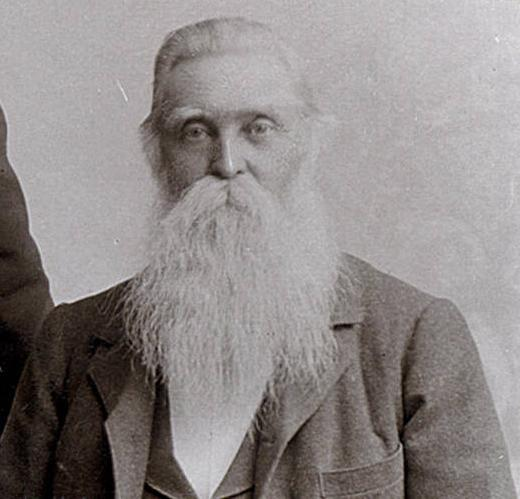

5th Presiding Patriarch
- February 18, 1855 – November 6, 1911
- Called by: Brigham Young
- Predecessor: "Uncle" John Smith
- Successor: Hyrum G. Smith

Personal details
- Born: September 22, 1832; Kirtland, Ohio, United States
- Died: November 6, 1911 (aged 79); Salt Lake City, Utah, United States
- Resting place: Salt Lake City Cemetery; 40.777°N 111.858°W
- Spouse(s): Hellen M. Fisher; Nancy M. Lemon
- Children: 10
- Parents: Hyrum Smith; Jerusha Barden

John Smith (September 22, 1832 – November 6, 1911), was the fifth Presiding Patriarch of the Church of Jesus Christ of Latter-day Saints (LDS Church). His father was Hyrum Smith, the older brother of Joseph Smith, the founder of The Church of Jesus Christ of Latter Day Saints. Having served for 56 years, he was the longest serving Presiding Patriarch in the history of the LDS Church. Smith traveled west to Winter Quarters and then Salt Lake City with the Mormon pioneers. He traveled with Heber C. Kimball's party and his step-mother Mary Fielding Smith. Smith joined the "Battalion of Life Guards" to protect the Latter-day Saints from Native Americans.

During his life, Smith maintained strong relationships with his family members in the Reorganized Church of Jesus Christ of Latter Day Saints (RLDS Church), particularly his cousin Joseph Smith III. Though John Smith was never released as Presiding Patriarch, some general authorities were outspoken in their disapproval of Smith's unwillingness to marry more than one plural wife and his habit of tobacco use. Smith was married to Hellen Maria Fisher with whom he had nine children. Smith married Nancy Melissa Lemmon as his plural wife after the encouragement of Brigham Young. Smith had one child with Lemmon.

== Early life and background ==
John Smith was born on September 22, 1832, in Kirtland, Ohio, to Hyrum Smith and his first wife, Jerusha Barden Smith, during the early days of the Latter Day Saint movement. He was among the first generation of children raised in the church. His mother died when he was five years old. The office of Presiding Patriarch was first held by Joseph Smith Sr., the father of the religion's founder. Before his death in 1840, Joseph Smith Sr. declared his eldest living son, Hyrum, would receive the office of patriarch by virtue of lineal succession. Hyrum at this time was one of the most influential members of the church and was widely seen as the most likely successor to its leadership should he outlive his brother. However, in 1844, both Hyrum and Joseph Smith were assassinated by a mob in Carthage, Illinois.

This event left the church leaderless. By consensus, it was expected that the title of Presiding Patriarch would pass to Hyrum Smith's eldest son, John. However, because John Smith was only 11 years of age at the time of his father's death, the position was instead claimed by a younger brother of Joseph Smith Jr., William, and later by the younger brother of Joseph Sr., John Smith, who was known to the church as "Uncle John". Smith was sometimes called "Young John" to differentiate him from his great-uncle.

John Smith was baptized into the LDS Church in 1843 and ordained an elder in the Nauvoo Temple on January 24, 1846, at the age of thirteen. He traveled with the family of Heber C. Kimball to Winter Quarters, Nebraska, when he was fifteen. In February 1847, he backtracked 150 miles to help his step-mother Mary Fielding Smith and her party. In Winter Quarters he built a log cabin for Fielding, built fences, tilled soil, and worked in the fields. In 1848, John Smith, along with Kimball, reached the Salt Lake Valley to join Brigham Young. Smith, at sixteen, personally drove five wagons down the mountains into the valley. He joined the "Battalion of Life Guards" in 1850 with the purpose of protecting the Latter-day Saints from Native Americans. After the death of Mary Fielding in 1852, Smith was required to support the family of eight.

== Church service ==
On February 18, 1855, at twenty-two years old, the younger John Smith succeeded his great-uncle, "Uncle John" Smith as fifth Presiding Patriarch of the LDS Church, following the latter's death. In this capacity, Smith acted as voice in the setting apart of his younger half-brother, Joseph F. Smith as president of the church. Although Smith was glossophobic and refused nearly every public speaking assignment that Brigham Young gave him, his patriarchal blessings were eloquent.

In 1862, Smith was asked to postpone his duties as a Patriarch to serve a mission in Denmark in order to "gain experience". However, according to scholar Irene M. Bates, in reality, he may have been sent on a mission because of concerns that the general authorities of the LDS Church had with Smith staying in close contact with his cousin Joseph Smith III and other relatives who participated in the Reorganized Church of Jesus Christ of Latter Day Saints (RLDS Church). Smith was, at one time, called a "Josephite" for maintaining close relationships with his family in the RLDS Church. The general authorities of the LDS Church frequently disapproved of Smith's actions such as refusing to live with his plural wife Melissa, or refusing to marry another woman. Additionally, he was publicly rebuked at the pulpit twice in the 1894 General Conference because of his tobacco usage.

Although it was intended that the oldest son of the Presiding Patriarch to succeed his father, Hyrum Fisher Smith did not succeed his father, Smith was succeeded by his grandson and Hyrum Fisher Smith's son, Hyrum G. Smith. This slight to Hyrum Fisher Smith caused some distress in the family. Although there is no official reason for this, according to Bates, it was likely because Hyrum F. Smith was separated from his wife when his father died, had a difficulty following the Word of Wisdom, and had recently had a difficult time keeping a steady job and supporting his family.

John Smith was buried in Salt Lake City. He became the longest-serving Presiding Patriarch in LDS Church history, remaining in that position for 56 years, until his death from pneumonia on November 6, 1911, in Salt Lake City. During his time as Patriarch, Smith gave over 20,000 blessings, willing to travel hundreds of miles on horseback in any weather condition to give blessings.

== Personal life ==
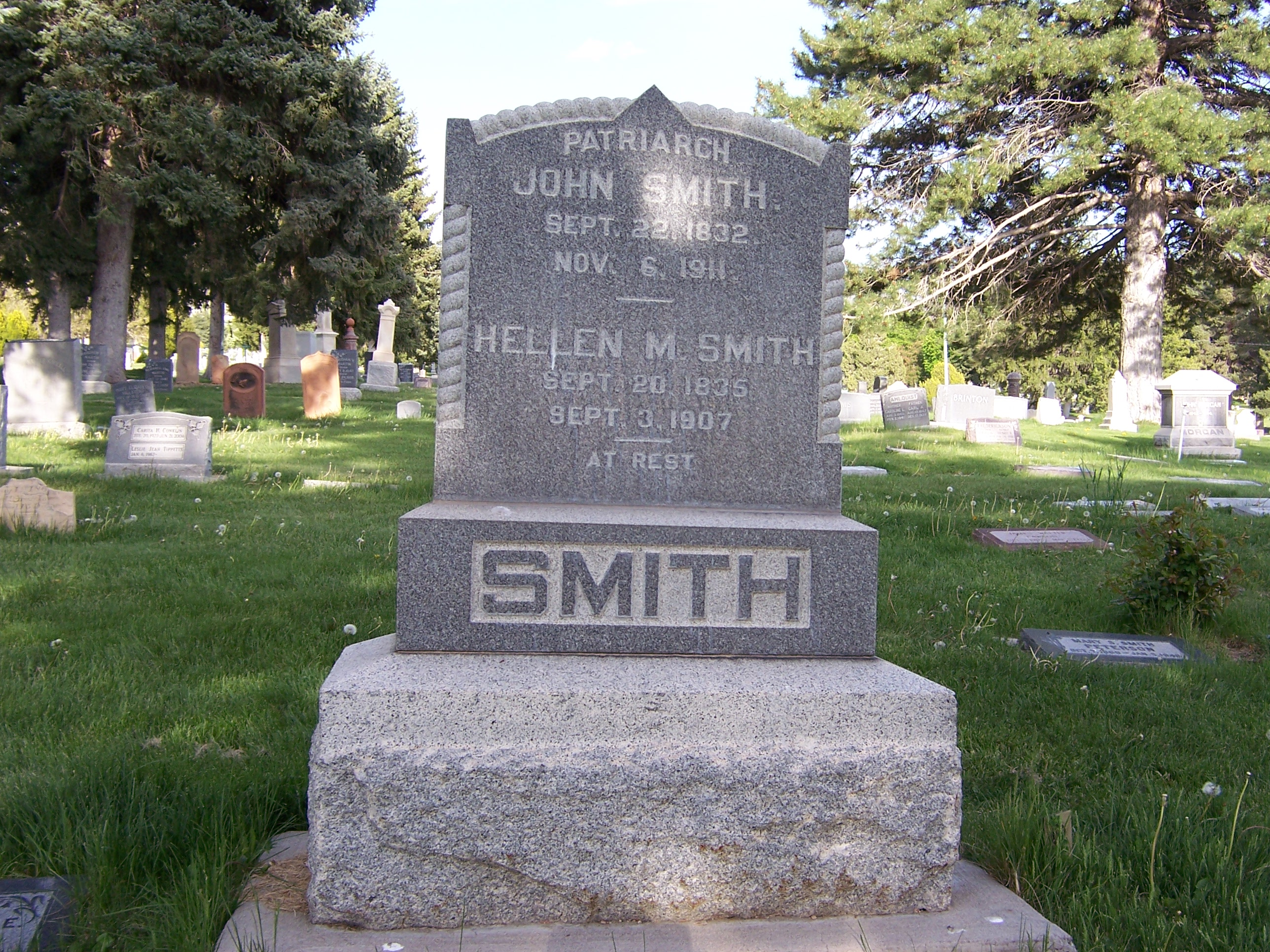
John Smith's grave marker

Smith was involved in plural marriage and had two wives. Smith's first wife was Hellen Maria Fisher. She was born on September 20, 1835, in Pennsylvania. Smith and Fisher married on December 25, 1853. She died on September 3, 1907. Hellen was outspoken about her lack of enthusiasm for plural marriage which was a highly encouraged practice by the LDS Church at the time. Brigham Young encouraged Smith to marry another woman, which Smith obeyed five months later. Smith married twenty-three year old Nancy Melissa Lemmon on February 18, 1857. Lemmon was born in Illinois on September 6, 1833, and died on March 29, 1915. After the death of Hellen, Joseph Smith III wrote to Smith stating that he was not surprised that Smith had not remarried, because he and Hellen had been married for a long time. Smith responded, admitting that he had been lonely since the death of Hellen, but that it would be difficult to find a substitute for Hellen since they had been married for nearly 54 years. In his letter to his cousin, Smith made no mention of Melissa to whom he was still married. Smith had nine children with Hellen Fisher. Smith had one child with Melissa Lemmon.

== See also ==
- Patriarch (Latter Day Saints)
- Patriarchal Priesthood

== Notes ==
The Church of Jesus Christ of Latter-day Saints titles
Preceded by "Uncle" John Smith	Presiding Patriarch; February 18, 1855–November 6, 1911	Succeeded by Hyrum G. Smith
