= Hyrum G. Smith =

American Mormon leader

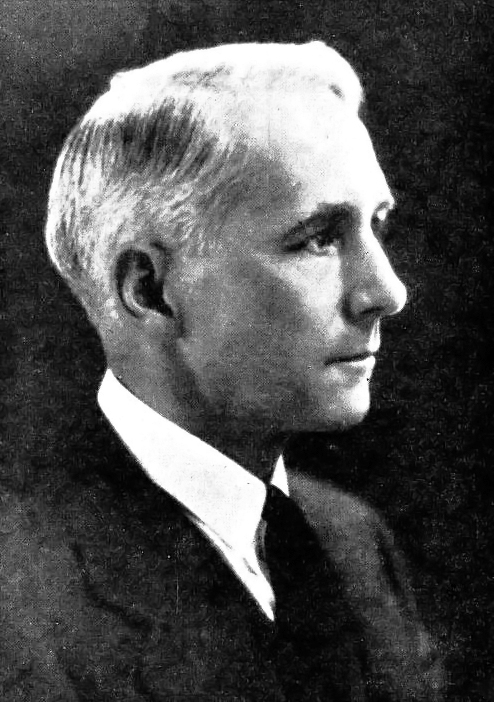
- Smith in 1932

6th Presiding Patriarch
- May 9, 1912 – February 4, 1932
- Called by: Joseph F. Smith
- Predecessor: John Smith
- Successor: Nicholas G. Smith (as Acting Presiding Patriarch (de facto))

Personal details
- Born: Hyrum Gibbs Smith; July 8, 1879; South Jordan, Utah Territory, United States
- Died: February 4, 1932 (aged 52); Salt Lake City, Utah, United States
- Children: 6

Hyrum Gibbs Smith (July 8, 1879 – February 4, 1932) was Presiding Patriarch of the Church of Jesus Christ of Latter-day Saints (LDS Church) from 1912 until his death.

== Biography ==
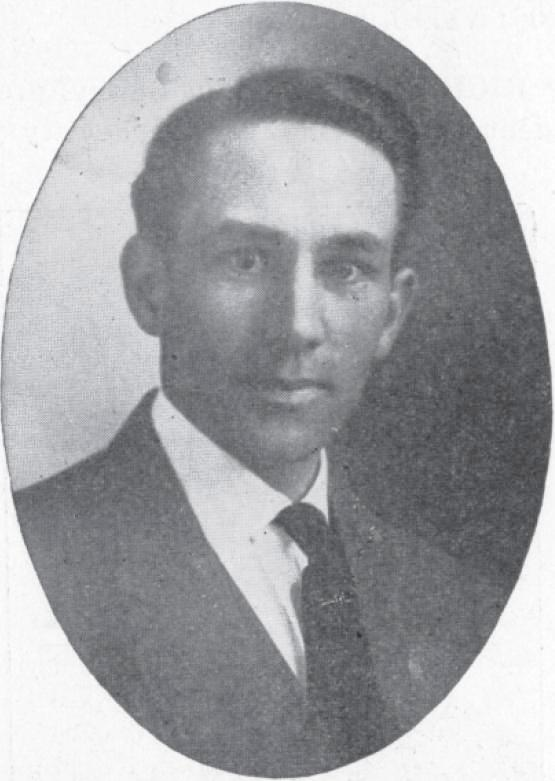
Smith in 1920

Smith was born in South Jordan, Salt Lake County, Utah Territory, to Hyrum Fisher Smith and Annie Maria Gibbs. He married Martha Electa Gee (1883–1968). While Smith was training in California to become a dentist, his grandfather John Smith, the Patriarch to the Church, died. The younger Smith was recalled to Utah to succeed him in the full-time position. He was ordained a high priest and Patriarch to the Church on May 9, 1912, by LDS Church president Joseph F. Smith. John Smith was the son of Hyrum Smith, the elder brother of Joseph Smith, the founder of the LDS Church. Joseph F. Smith was a younger brother of John Smith and thus the great-uncle of Hyrum G. Smith.

Smith died of pneumonia in Salt Lake City. Days before his death, he called for his son, Eldred G. Smith, with the intention of ordaining him as his successor as Patriarch to the Church, but was dissuaded from doing so by his own wife, Martha, who optimistically convinced him he would live for many more years. Notably, such an ordination would have been out of harmony with the policy of the current president of the church, but apparently would have been consistent with the precedent set when Joseph Smith Sr. ordained Hyrum Smith as his successor to the patriarchate. After his death a few days later, the office of Presiding Patriarch was left vacant for several years, but was eventually filled by Smith's second cousin Joseph Fielding Smith. In 1947, Hyrum G. Smith's son, Eldred G. Smith, became the Patriarch to the Church.

== See also ==
- Lineal succession (Latter Day Saints)
- Patriarch (Latter Day Saints)
- Patriarchal Priesthood
- Patriarchal blessing

== Notes ==
The Church of Jesus Christ of Latter-day Saints titles
| Preceded by John Smith | Presiding Patriarch; May 9, 1912 - February 4, 1932 | Succeeded by Nicholas G. Smith as Acting Presiding Patriarch (de facto) |
