= Hymns of the Saints =

Community of Christ 1981 hymnal

Hymns of the Saints, published in Independence, Missouri by Herald House in 1981, was the official English-language hymnal of the Reorganized Church of Jesus Christ of Latter Day Saints (which became the Community of Christ in 2001), until 2013. The hymnal contains 501 Christian hymns representing a variety of musical styles. It was succeeded by Community of Christ Sings, which was published in October 2013.

Harold Neal served as chairman of the 1981 Hymnal Committee. Production of Hymns of the Saints was coordinated by Peter Judd of the Worship Office and Roger Revell of the Music Office. In the preface to the work, the committee acknowledged the influence of “changing theological concepts, the searching eye of historical research, shifting modes of expression, and increased sensitivity to the sanctity of personhood” in the preparation of the hymnal and the selection of hymns.

Of the 501 hymns, 209 were added since The Hymnal, which was published in 1956. The hymns are in four major sections: Praise and Thanksgiving (hymns 1–78); Contemplation and Renewal (hymns 79–185); God's Word for Us (186–368); and Commission and Commitment (hymns 369–501).

In the hymnal, 127 lyrical contributions and 88 musical contributions were made by members of the denomination while the remainder are from earlier Latter Day Saint and Christian hymnists. Aside from six hymn texts drawn directly from the psalms (Hymns 15, 66, 110, 125, 258, and 461), the earliest Christian text is attributed to Aurelius Clemens Prudentius, who lived from A.D. 348 to 413; he is credited as the original author of the text from which Hymn 220, "Of the Father’s Love Begotten", was translated by John Mason Neale and Henry W. Baker.

Among the most prolific contributors to the texts of the hymns in the book are (number of contributions are noted in parentheses) Roy Cheville (13), Geoffrey Spencer (13), Isaac Watts (12), Charles Wesley (11), Allan Tyree (10), Fred Kaan (9), Evan A. Fry (9), Naomi Russell (7), and Barbara Howard (6).

Hymns of the Saints was cited as a catalyst for inspiration by Community of Christ president Stephen M. Veazey in his discussion of Doctrine and Covenants Section 163.
