= Presiding Patriarch =

Leader in the Latter Day Saint movement

In the Latter Day Saint movement, the Presiding Patriarch (also called Presiding Evangelist, Patriarch over the Church, Patriarch of the Church, or Patriarch to the Church) is a church-wide leadership office within the priesthood. Among the duties of the Presiding Patriarch are to preside in council meetings, ordain other patriarchs, and administer patriarchal blessings.

Originally, the office of Presiding Patriarch was one of the highest and most important offices of the church's priesthood. The role was equated by Joseph Smith with Biblical patriarchs from Adam to Abraham, Isaac, and Jacob, and it was expected that the office would descend through lineal succession from father to son. This precedent was set when Hyrum Smith, Joseph's brother, became the second Presiding Patriarch because he was the eldest surviving son of the first Presiding Patriarch, Joseph Smith Sr. When the office was given to Hyrum, he was given "keys of the patriarchal priesthood over the kingdom of God on earth, even the Church of the Latter Day Saints." Thus, some have argued that Presiding Patriarch is an office of the Patriarchal Priesthood. However, the existence and meaning of the Patriarchal Priesthood is controversial and uncertain.

== Community of Christ ==
=== Chronology of the Presiding Patriarchs/Evangelist of Community of Christ ===
Date	Presiding Patriarchs/Evangelist	Notes
18 December 1833 – 14 September 1840	Joseph Smith Sr.	Father of Joseph Smith
14 September 1840 - 27 June 1844	Hyrum Smith	Oldest surviving son of Joseph Smith Sr.
24 May 1845 – 19 October 1845	William Smith	Oldest surviving son of Joseph Smith Sr. William Smith was patriarch to the church until his name and positions were read at the 19 October 1845 general conference. Conference attendees unanimously voted against Smith being retained as both an apostle and the patriarch. He then lost both offices and was disfellowshipped from the church. William Smith would also be referred to as "Petitioner for RLDS Patriarchate" from April 6, 1872 – November 13, 1893 by the Community of Christ (RLDS).
(Petitioner) April 6, 1872 – November 13, 1893	William Smith	Oldest surviving son of Joseph Smith Sr. William Smith was patriarch to the church until his name and positions were read at the 19 October 1845 general conference. Conference attendees unanimously voted against Smith being retained as both an apostle and the patriarch. He then lost both offices and was disfellowshipped from the church. William Smith would also be referred to as "Petitioner for RLDS Patriarchate" from April 6, 1872 – November 13, 1893 by the Community of Christ (RLDS).
April 1897 – 12 August 1909	Alexander H. Smith	Brother of Joseph Smith III
12 August 1909 – 20 April 1913	Joseph R. Lambert	Acting Presiding Patriarch
20 April 1913 – 10 April 1938	Frederick A. Smith	Son of Alexander H. Smith.
10 April 1938 – 4 February 1958	Elbert A. Smith	Grandson of Joseph Smith, Son of David Hyrum Smith
4 February 1958 – 4 April 1974	Roy A. Cheville	Left his professorial career at Graceland College to accept ordination. In 1974 he became "Patriarch Emeritus". First person to serve in that office who was not a direct descendant of Joseph Smith Sr.
4 April 1974 - 29 March 1982	Reed M. Holmes	
29 March 1982 – 5 April 1992	Duane E. Couey	
5 April 1992 – 5 April 1994	Paul W. Booth	"Presiding Evangelist" became preferred title.
5 April 1994 – 2000	Everett S. Graffeo	
2000 – 6 March 2006	Danny A. Belrose	
1 May 2006 – 27 March 2007	Richard E. Kohlman	Acting Presiding Evangelist
26 March 2007 – 31 March 2016	David R. Brock	
31 March 2016 – 2 June 2025	Jane M. Gardner	First female presiding evangelist
2 June 2025 –	Mareva M. Arnaud Tchong	First non-American presiding evangelist and first non-native English speaking presiding evangelist. Arnaud Tchong is Tahitian and was formerly a member of the Council of Twelve Apostles.

== The Church of Jesus Christ of Latter-day Saints ==
When a Presiding Patriarch has existed, The Church of Jesus Christ of Latter-day Saints (LDS Church) has sustained the person as a prophet, seer, and revelator. In the church's history, there have been eight Presiding Patriarchs, three Acting Presiding Patriarchs, and one Patriarch Emeritus.

The LDS Church effectively discontinued the office of Presiding Patriarch in 1979, indicating enough local patriarchs existed so that the church-wide position was no longer needed. However, E. Gary Smith, the eldest son of the final patriarch, Eldred G. Smith, rejected this explanation, suggesting instead that the dissolution of the office was the inevitable result of longstanding tensions rising from the incompatibility of a hereditary position with the broader church hierarchy based in "office charisma," consistent with the Weberian model of bureaucracy. Until that time, the role and duties of the office had varied. The Presiding Patriarch sometimes appointed local patriarchs in the church's stakes and presided over them as a loose "Quorum of Patriarchs." Like the local patriarchs, the Presiding Patriarch was also empowered to give patriarchal blessings.

=== Chronology of the Presiding Patriarchs of the LDS Church ===
Dates	Presiding Patriarch	Notes
18 December 1833 – 14 September 1840	Joseph Smith Sr.	Father of Joseph Smith
14 September 1840 – 27 June 1844	Hyrum Smith	Oldest surviving son of Joseph Smith Sr.
24 May 1845 – 6 October 1845	William Smith	Oldest surviving son of Joseph Smith Sr. William Smith was patriarch to the church until his name and positions were read at the 6 October 1845 general conference. Conference attendees unanimously voted against Smith being retained as both an apostle and the patriarch. He then lost both offices and was disfellowshipped from the church.
1 January 1849 – 23 May 1854	John Smith	"Uncle John"; brother of Joseph Smith Sr.
18 February 1855 – 6 November 1911	John Smith	Son of Hyrum Smith
9 May 1912 – 4 February 1932	Hyrum G. Smith	Grandson of his predecessor John Smith; great-grandson of Hyrum Smith
4 February 1932 – 1934	Nicholas G. Smith (de facto Acting Presiding Patriarch)	Son of apostle John Henry Smith; grandson of apostle George A. Smith; great-grandson of former presiding patriarch "Uncle" John Smith; was never officially called, set apart, or sustained as the Acting Presiding Patriarch, but carried out the functions of the office
1934 – October 8, 1937	Frank B. Woodbury (de facto Acting Presiding Patriarch)	Unrelated to Smith family; was never officially called, set apart, or sustained as the Acting Presiding Patriarch, but carried out the functions of the office
October 8, 1937 – 8 October 1942	George F. Richards (Acting Presiding Patriarch)	Unrelated to Smith family; unlike Nicholas G. Smith and Frank B. Woodbury, was officially called, set apart, and sustained as the Acting Presiding Patriarch
8 October 1942 – 6 October 1946	Joseph Fielding Smith	Great-grandson of Hyrum Smith; not a descendant of previous presiding patriarch Hyrum G. Smith; ordained as "Patriarch to the Church" rather than "Presiding Patriarch," a change in title that was accompanied by a reduction in the scope of the office, as Smith was not permitted to ordain or formally supervise local patriarchs. Released by church president George Albert Smith amid reports of homosexual activity. Restored to "priesthood status" in 1957.
10 April 1947 – 4 October 1979	Eldred G. Smith	Son of former Presiding Patriarch Hyrum G. Smith; great-great-grandson of Hyrum Smith. Patriarch emeritus from 4 October 1979 to his death on 4 April 2013. No longer sustained as "prophet, seer, and revelator" following designation as patriarch emeritus.
Position abolished

== See also ==
- Lineal succession (Latter Day Saints)
- Patriarch (Latter Day Saints)
- Patriarchal priesthood
