= Lineal succession =

Lineal succession was a doctrine of the Latter Day Saint movement, whereby certain key church positions were held by right of lineal inheritance. Though lineal succession is now not commonly used, the offices connected with the practice were the President of the Church and the Presiding Patriarch.

== Priesthood ==
Latter Day Saint scripture teaches that a person may also be called through their lineage, so that they have a legal right to a priesthood office. The Doctrine and Covenants (D&C) teaches that descendants of Aaron have legal right to the priesthood: "And if they be literal descendants of Aaron, they have a legal right to the bishopric, if they are the firstborn among the sons of Aaron." In a revelation recorded by Joseph Smith, recorded in the D&C, he was promised his lineage would have the priesthood: "Therefore, thus saith the Lord unto you, with whom the priesthood hath continued through the lineage of your fathers—For ye are lawful heirs, according to the flesh, and have been hid from the world with Christ in God—Therefore your life and the priesthood have remained, and must needs remain through you and your lineage until the restoration of all things spoken by the mouths of all the holy prophets since the world began."

One who has the right and calling to hold these positions through lineage must still be ordained by the church hierarchy before officiating in the office.

== Church president ==
During his lifetime, Smith was president of the Church of Jesus Christ of Latter Day Saints. At the time of Smith's death in 1844, most Latter Day Saints agreed that his older brother, Hyrum, would have been Smith's successor, had he not also been killed. Another likely successor was Smith's younger brother, Samuel, who died less than one month later. A few asserted that the last surviving Smith brother, William, should become church president, and William made that claim for a time and gathered a small faction of followers around him.

Many Latter Day Saints believed that a son of Joseph Smith should be the successor to the church presidency. Several prominent leaders asserted that a patriarchal blessing given to Smith's eldest son, Joseph Smith III, designated the boy to succeed his father. However, at the time of his father's death, Joseph III was only 11 years old.

As a result, many leaders arose who either argued against lineal succession or suggested that the church would have to wait for Joseph Smith III to mature. This created what is known as the succession crisis. The largest group, led by Brigham Young, were proponents of a system whereby the senior member of the Quorum of the Twelve Apostles would succeed to the church presidency, absent any lineal succession. This system of apostolic succession continues in the Church of Jesus Christ of Latter-day Saints (LDS Church).

Other Latter Day Saints living in the Midwest United States continued to support lineal succession and in 1860, they invited Joseph Smith III to become president of what would later be called the Reorganized Church of Jesus Christ of Latter Day Saints (RLDS Church), known today as Community of Christ. This church continued to appoint presidents who were patrilineal descendants of Joseph Smith until 1996, when Wallace B. Smith (a great-grandson of the Latter Day Saint founder) designated W. Grant McMurray (who was unrelated to the Smiths) as his successor. Abandonment of lineal succession by the RLDS Church was a factor that caused a schism and foundation of several small Latter Day Saint churches, including the Remnant Church of Jesus Christ of Latter Day Saints, which accepted Frederick Niels Larsen (a grandson of Frederick M. Smith through his daughter Lois) as its Prophet–President.

== Presiding Patriarch ==
Most Latter Day Saints originally believed that the Presiding Patriarch of the church should be transmitted by lineal succession. The first Presiding Patriarch, Joseph Smith, Sr., was the father of the founding prophet. On his death bed, Joseph Sr. appointed his eldest living son, Hyrum Smith, Presiding Patriarch "by right" of inheritance. When Hyrum was killed in 1844, his youngest brother, William, became Presiding Patriarch. William broke with Brigham Young, President of the Quorum of the Twelve Apostles, in part over the office. William asserted that the Presiding Patriarch's title was "Patriarch over the Church" and Young argued for the less grand "Patriarch to the Church." William was later excommunicated by Young's faction, which became the LDS Church. William joined with James J. Strang, a rival claimant for the church presidency. Breaking with the Strangites, William eventually joined his nephew, Joseph Smith III, and the RLDS Church. William petitioned Joseph III to restore him to the office of Presiding Patriarch of the RLDS Church, but the re-appointment never occurred.

After William's death, Joseph Smith III reinstituted the office of Presiding Patriarch, appointing his brother Alexander Hale Smith to the office. Thereafter, the office of Presiding Patriarch in the RLDS Church remained within the Smith family and was passed by lineal succession until 1958. In that year, W. Wallace Smith ended the tradition by calling Roy Cheville as Presiding Patriarch. Today, Presiding Patriarchs of what is now the Community of Christ are known as "Presiding Evangelists."

After William Smith was excommunicated by Brigham Young, "Uncle" John Smith (brother of Joseph Smith, Sr.) was appointed by Young to be Presiding Patriarch of the LDS Church. After the death of that John Smith, another John Smith (a son of Hyrum Smith) became Presiding Patriarch of the LDS Church. Thereafter, the majority of the Presiding Patriarchs of the LDS Church were descendants of Hyrum, in keeping with the tradition of lineal succession. The LDS Church ceased to include Presiding Patriarchs in its hierarchy after 1979, when Eldred G. Smith was released from official duties and designated as emeritus.

== Apostleship ==
In the LDS Church, some leaders have regarded the office of apostle as one that may be transmitted by lineal succession, though such a practice has never been formalized in the church. The following father–son apostle combinations have existed in the LDS Church:

- Brigham Young selected and ordained three of his sons to be apostles at relatively young ages: Brigham Young, Jr., (age 29), John Willard Young (age 11), and Joseph Angell Young (age 29).
- John Taylor selected and ordained his son, John W. Taylor, to be an apostle at age 25.
- Wilford Woodruff selected and ordained his son, Abraham O. Woodruff, to be an apostle at age 23.
- Joseph F. Smith selected and ordained his sons, Hyrum M. Smith (age 29) and Joseph Fielding Smith (age 33) as apostles. Joseph F. Smith was a son of Hyrum Smith, who was an apostle and the Assistant President of the Church.
- all members of the three-generation George A. Smith, John Henry Smith, and George Albert Smith line were apostles.
- all members of the three-generation Amasa Lyman, Francis M. Lyman, and Richard R. Lyman line were apostles.
- all members of the three-generation Franklin D. Richards, George F. Richards, and LeGrand Richards line were apostles.
- George Q. Cannon and his sons, Sylvester Q. Cannon and Abraham H. Cannon, were all apostles.
- Jedediah M. Grant and his son, Heber J. Grant, were both apostles.
- Marriner W. Merrill and his son, Joseph F. Merrill, were both apostles.
- Matthias F. Cowley and his son, Matthew Cowley, were both apostles.

Additionally, the following grandfather–grandson apostle combinations have existed:

- Willard Richards and Stephen L Richards
- Heber C. Kimball and Spencer W. Kimball
- Ezra T. Benson and Ezra Taft Benson
- Melvin J. Ballard and M. Russell Ballard

== Interrelation of church offices with the Smith family ==
The inter-relationship of the offices of President of the Church (also known as "Prophet-President") and Presiding Patriarch (also known a Presiding Evangelist) in the Smith family, and the doctrine of Lineal succession, of pre and post-reorganization in the Community of Christ:

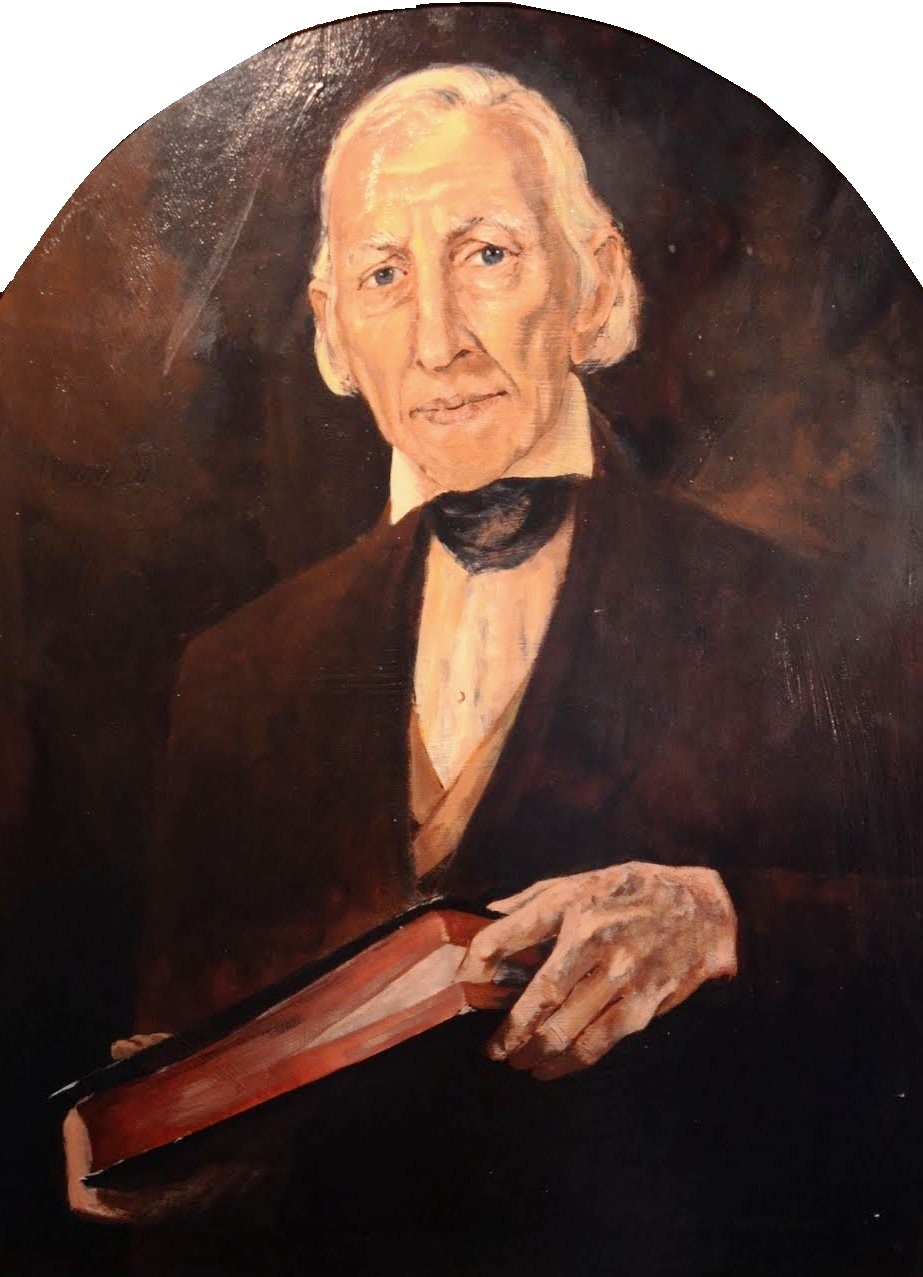
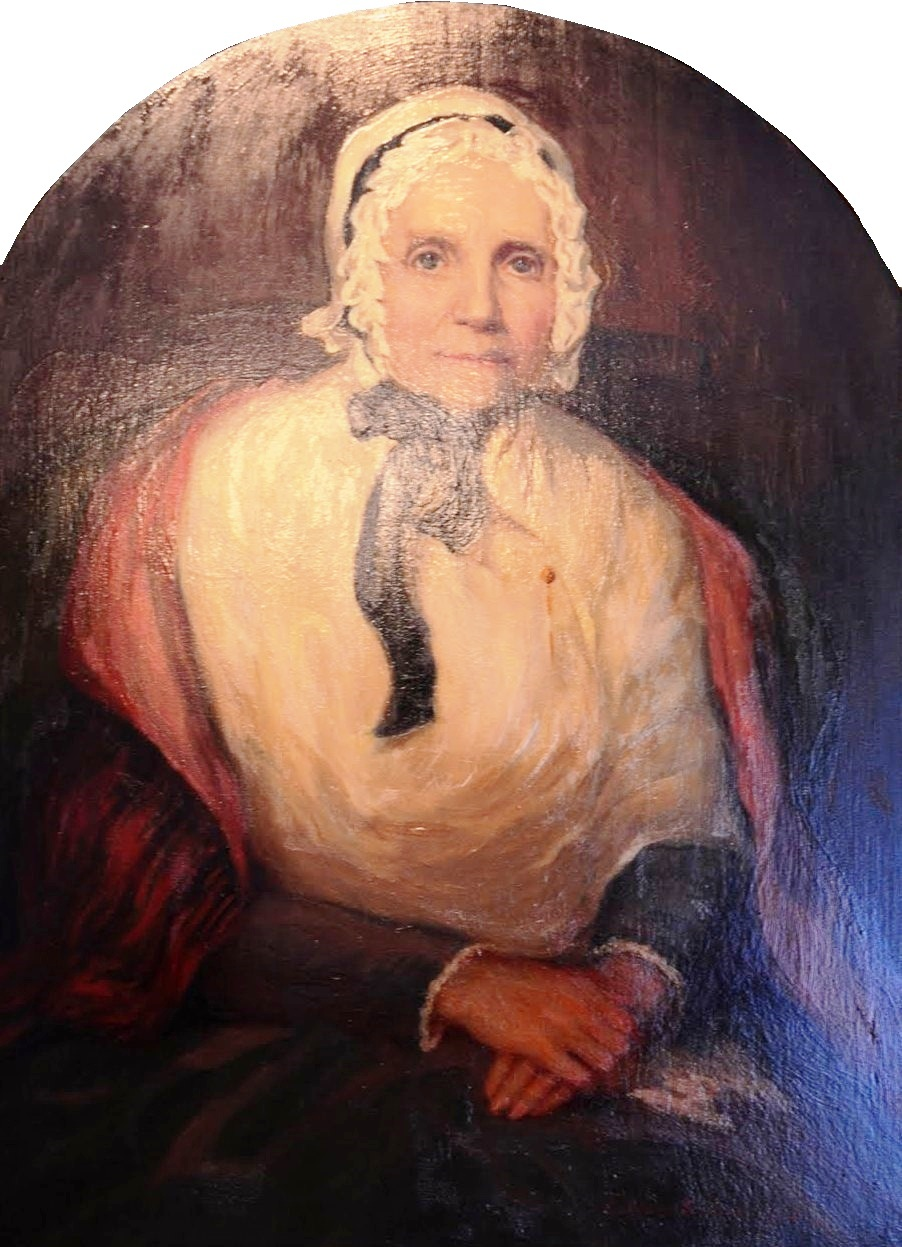
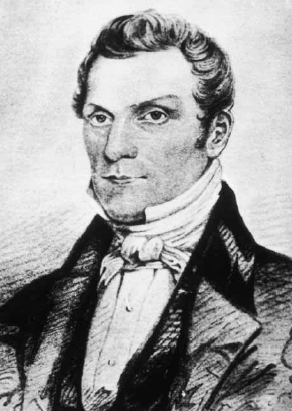
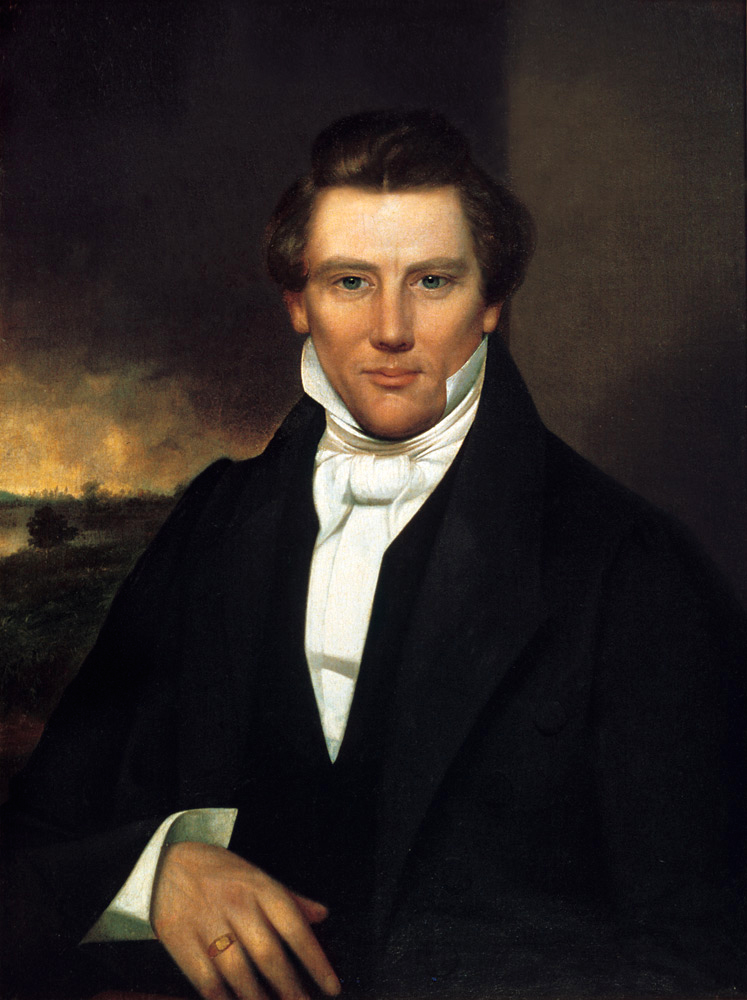
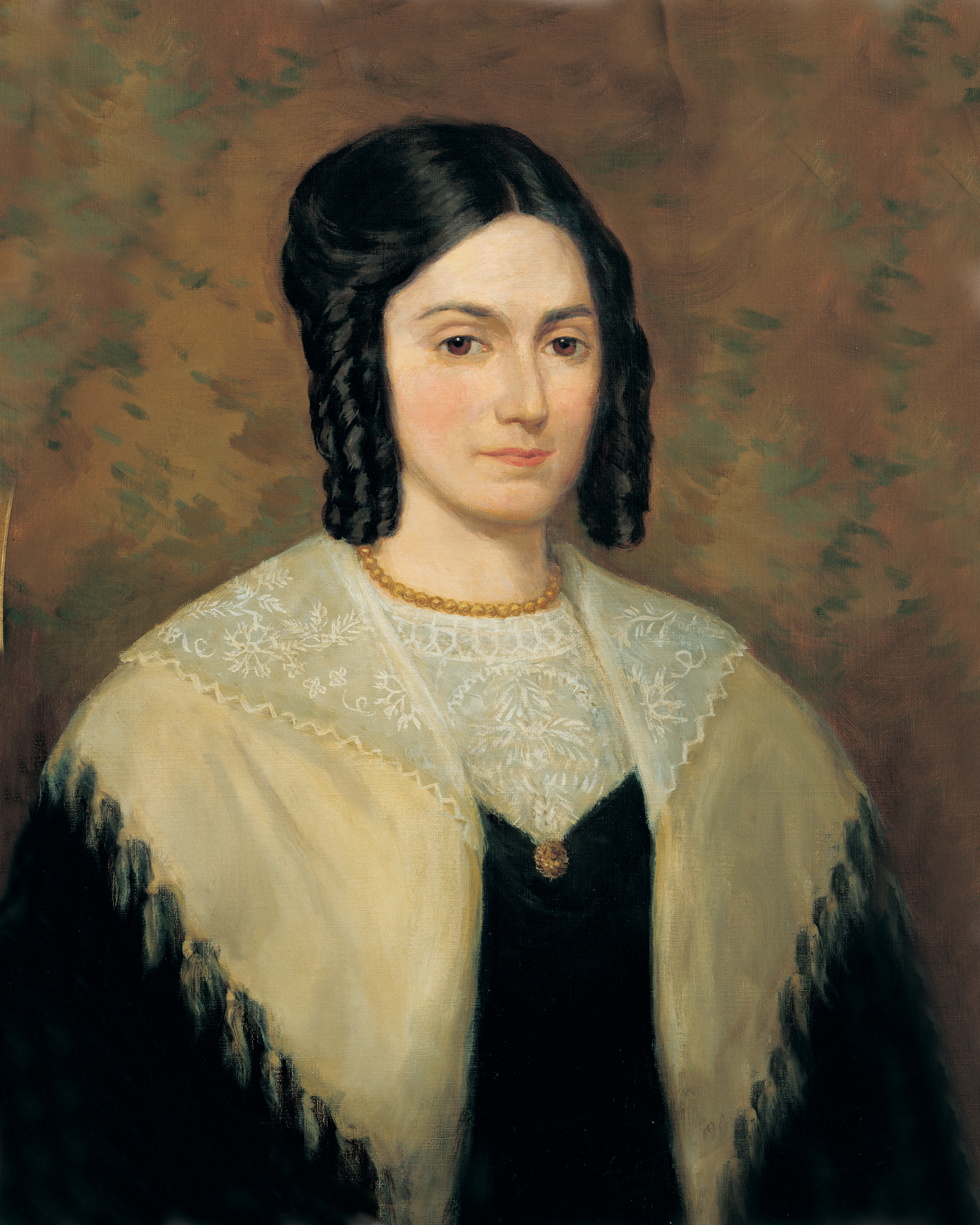
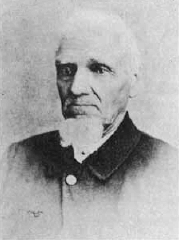
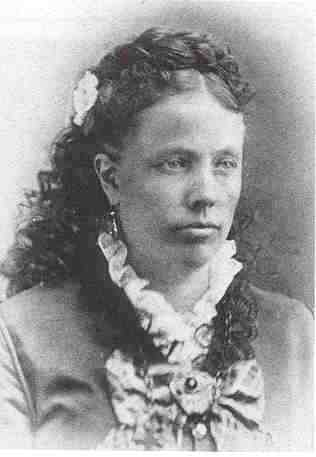
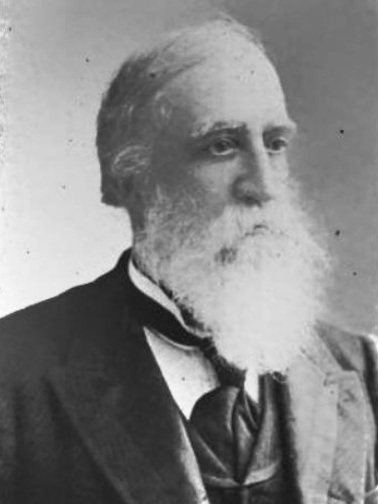
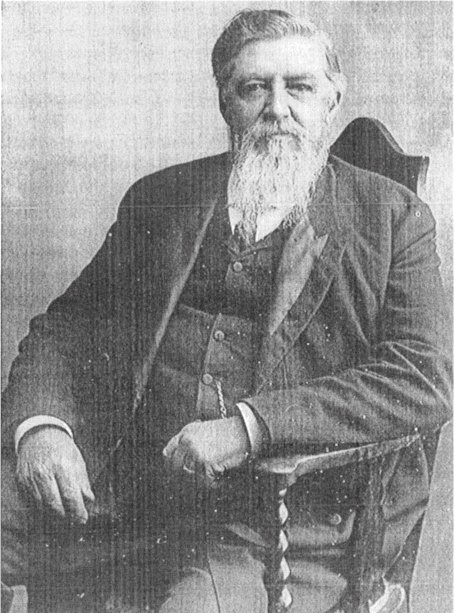
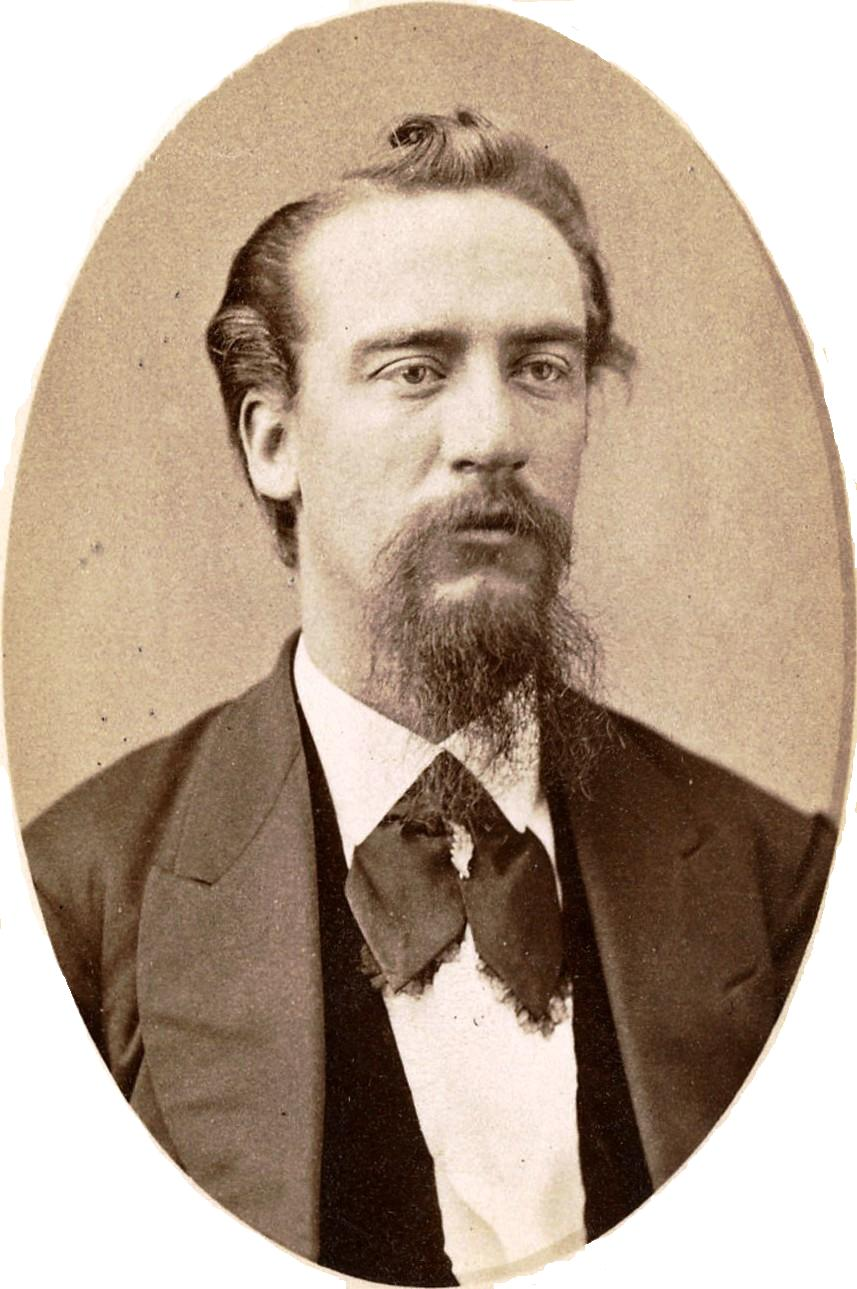
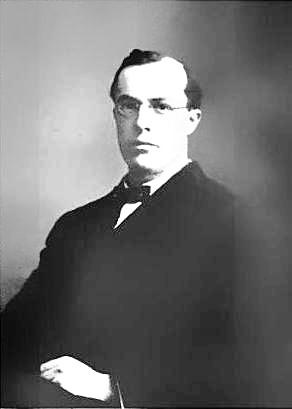
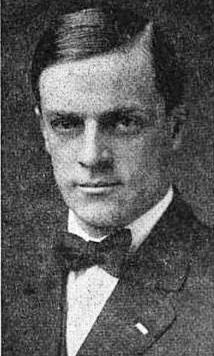
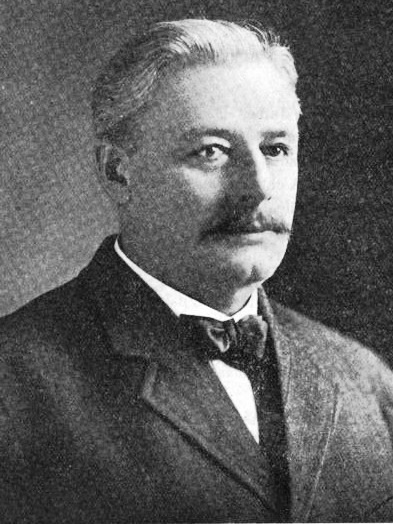
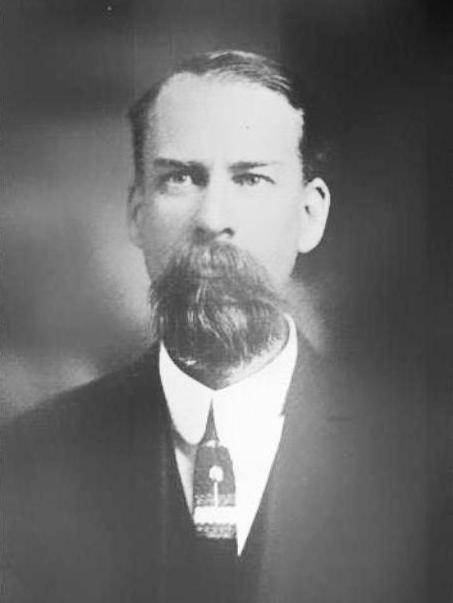
Joseph Smith, Sr. 1771–1840; Presiding Patriarch (1833–1840)	Lucy Mack Smith; 1776–1856
Hyrum Smith; 1800–1844; Presiding Patriarch (1841–1844)	Joseph Smith, Jr. 1805–1844; President of the Church (1830–1844)	Emma Hale Smith; 1804–1879; Elect Lady	William B. Smith; 1811–1893; Presiding Patriarch (1845)
Bertha Madison; 1843–1896	Joseph Smith III; 1832–1914; Prophet-President (1860–1914)	Ada Clark; 1871–1914	Alexander Hale Smith; 1838–1909; Presiding Patriarch (1897–1902)	David Hyrum Smith; 1844–1904
Frederick M. Smith; 1874–1946; Prophet–President (1914–1946)	Israel A. Smith; 1876–1958; Prophet–President (1946–1958)	W. Wallace Smith; 1900–1989; Prophet–President (1958–1978)	Frederick A. Smith; 1862–1954; Presiding Patriarch (1913–1938)	Elbert A. Smith; 1871–1959; Presiding Patriarch (1938–1958)
