= Alexander Hale Smith =

RLDS Church leader, son of Joseph and Emma Smith (1838–1909)

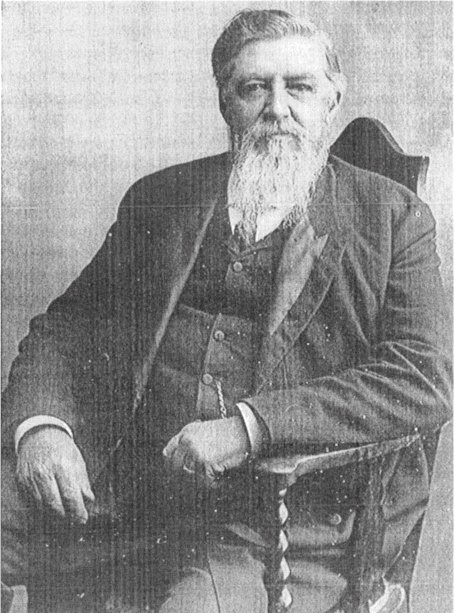

Presiding Patriarch of the RLDS Church (Note: The Community of Christ was called the Reorganized Church of Jesus Christ of Latter Day Saints before its name change in 2001.)
- April 1897 – August 12, 1909
- Called by: Joseph Smith III
- Predecessor: William Smith (Note: While William Smith, who was the Presiding Patriarch of the LDS Church from May 24 to October 6, 1845, believed that he was entitled to become the presiding patriarch or a member of the Council of Twelve Apostles of the RLDS Church. Joseph Smith III, his nephew, did not agree and William Smith remained a high priest in the RLDS Church for the remainder of his life.)
- Successor: Joseph R. Lambert

President of the Council of Twelve Apostles
- April 15, 1890 – April 12, 1897
- Called by: Joseph Smith III
- Successor: William H. Kelley

Council of Twelve Apostles
- April 10, 1873 – April 12, 1897
- Called by: Joseph Smith III
- Predecessor: Samuel Powers
- Successor: Isaac N. White; John W. Wight; R. C. Evans

Personal details
- Born: June 2, 1838; Far West, Missouri
- Died: August 12, 1909 (aged 71); Nauvoo, Illinois
- Resting place: Rose Hill Cemetery; 40.625°N 93.9475°W
- Spouse(s): Elizabeth Kendall
- Children: 9
- Parents: Joseph Smith; Emma Hale Smith

Alexander Hale Smith (June 2, 1838 – August 12, 1909) was the third surviving son of Joseph Smith and Emma Hale Smith. Smith was born in Far West, Missouri. Alexander Smith became a senior leader of the Reorganized Church of Jesus Christ of Latter Day Saints (RLDS Church, now Community of Christ). Smith served as an apostle and as Presiding Patriarch of the church. He became religiously inclined after the April 1862 death of his older brother Frederick G. W. Smith (b. 1836), who had not been baptized, and was baptized on May 25, 1862, in Nauvoo, Illinois, by another older brother, Joseph Smith III.

Alexander was ordained an apostle on April 10, 1873, and "served a mission to the Pacific Slope" with David Hyrum Smith in 1875. He was ordained president of the Council of Twelve on April 15, 1890, at Lamoni, Iowa. He was called to be a counselor to his brother, Joseph Smith III, and also a patriarch and evangelical minister on April 12, 1897. He went on a mission to Australia, Hawaii, and the Society Islands in 1901. Smith was a partner in a photograph gallery before becoming a carpenter.

Smith married Elizabeth Agnes Kendall in Nauvoo, on May 23, 1861. A History of Decatur County, Iowa, published in 1915, provides many details about his life and his personality:

He loved the wide outdoors, land and water and sky, and delighted in athletic sports, holding a record in his younger days as one of the best skaters and one of the two surest shots in the community. Of the nine children born to him, one daughter, Mrs. Grace Madison, died and is buried in San Bernardino, California, and one son, Don A., is buried at Lamoni. The second daughter, Mrs. Ina I. Wright, lived at Avalon, New South Wales, Australia, and Mrs. Coral Horner lived near Davis City, Iowa, she spent the later years of her life with her husband in Ronan, Montana. Mrs. Emma Kennedy and the youngest sons, Joseph G. and Arthur M., resided at Independence, Missouri, while the oldest children, Fred A. and Mrs. Heman C. Smith, were residents of Lamoni, where the widow still lived in their home on the south side.

== Notes ==
Community of Christ titles
Preceded by William Smith; Petitioner for Patriarchate	Presiding Patriarch; April 12, 1897 – 12 August 1909	Succeeded by Joseph R. Lambert; Acting Presiding Patriarch
Preceded by	President of the Council of Twelve Apostles; April 15, 1890 - April 12, 1897	Succeeded by William H. Kelley
Preceded by Samuel Powers	Council of Twelve Apostles; April 10, 1873 - April 12, 1897	Succeeded by Isaac N. White; John W. Wight; R. C. Evans
