= Roy Cheville =

RLDS Church leader (1897–1986)

Roy A. Cheville

Presiding Patriarchs/Evangelist Community of Christ
- February 4, 1958 – April 4, 1974
- Called by: W. Wallace Smith
- Predecessor: Elbert A. Smith
- Successor: Reed M. Holmes

Personal details
- Born: October 2, 1897; Maxwell, Iowa
- Died: April 6, 1986 (aged 88); Independence, Missouri
- Spouse(s): Nell Weldon Cheville
- Children: 2

Roy A. Cheville (October 2, 1897 – April 6, 1986) was a religious leader, theologian and educator in the Reorganized Church of Jesus Christ of Latter Day Saints (RLDS Church), which became Community of Christ in 2001. Cheville graduated from Graceland University in 1921 with an Associate of Arts (A.A.) degree in liberal arts and religious education. In 1926, he authored Graceland's Alma Mater Hymn while on the faculty. He obtained his Ph. B. in 1922, an A.M in Divinity in 1923, a D.B. in Practical Theology in 1925, and later a Ph.D. in religion in 1942, all from the University of Chicago. He was the first member of his denomination to complete a doctoral level religious education.

Cheville was regarded as an influential professor of Religion at Graceland from 1923 to 1960 and also served as the campus pastor. Cheville taught many introductory religion courses from his own text, “Growing Up In Religion” stressing that a view of God restricted to scriptural and doctrinal traditions was too small and confining.

Cheville was called to the office of Presiding Patriarch in the RLDS Church in 1958 by W. Wallace Smith and was the first person to serve in that office who was not a direct descendant of Joseph Smith In that role, he presided over the Order of Evangelists, which had 89 members at that time. He authored more than 345 articles, 20 pamphlets and 25 books on Christian family life, spirituality, church history, theology, scriptures, and other religious topics. He was an authority on the subject of religious socialization, but his position at Graceland University and later as Presiding Patriarch provided him with a platform from which he could be heard on a wide variety of subjects. His 1962 text “Did the Light Go Out?” represented a turn away from the traditional RLDS viewpoint regarding the Great Apostasy. He wrote numerous hymn texts published in Hymns of the Saints and prior hymnals, including “Afar in Old Judea” and had a reputation as a vigorous song leader and a self-styled humorist. The Cheville Chapel at Graceland University is named in his honor.

== Hymns by Roy Cheville ==
- 1921: "Song of Entreaty"
- 1928: "O Come Ye Sons of Graceland All" (Alma Mater Hymn)
- 1930: "Dear Old Nauvoo"
- 1932: "A Youth's Prayer of Thanksgiving"
- 1933: "I Know That My Redeemer Lives"
- 1933: "Speak of the Best"
- 1933: "God Send us Men"
- 1939: "Are Ye Able"
- 1939: "O Lord of Life, Of Light, Of Inspiration"
- 1939: "Our Homes We Dedicate to Thee"
- 1941: "The Church of Christ is Calling"
- 1941: "Rise O Youth"
- 1941: "Forward"
- 1941: "Come Up Higher"
- 1941: "Open My Eyes"
- 1941: "Prayer of Dedication"
- 1944: "Forward Thro' the Ages"
- 1944: "We Read Thy Word of Promise"
- 1944: "For All the Saints"
- 1950: "O Jesus the Giver" 3rd stanza
- 1950: "Hast thou Heard It"
- 1950: "All Things Are Thine"
- 1950: "Master Speak! Thy Servant Heareth"
- 1950: "Heaven Can Be Where'er the Lord Lifts Us From Lowly Sphere"
- 1950: "Commitment Hymn"
- 1950: "We Honor Those, Our Father, Whose Service Honored Thee"
- 1950: "Glory to the Heroes" adapted from W.G. Tarrant
- 1950: "Lo, The Time is Now Fulfilled"
- 1950: "Walk Thou With Me, O Lord of Love"
- 1950: "Softly the Shadows Fall" adapted from Adelaide Proctor
- 1950: "Truth Has No Single Voice"
- 1950: "Sacred Books, The Church's Treasure"
- 1950: "Thou Who Through All The Ages Spoke"
- 1950: "O Send Thy Spirit Lord"
- 1953: "Conviction"
- 1955: "The Christ of Every Age"
- 1956: "Afar In Old Judea"
- 1956: "My Soul Praise The Lord"
- 1956: "O Lord, Thy People Gathered Here"
- 1956: "O Master to All Children Near"
- 1956: "Friend of the Home"
- 1956: "For Bread Before Us Broken"
- 1956: "Forth In Thy Name"
- 1956: "O Sometimes the Shadows"
- 1956: "Send Forth Thy Light O Zion"
- 1956: "Thou Hast Been Our Guide"
- 1959: "Speak Thou Today, O Lord"
- 1968: "Hymn of Zion Builders"
- 1979: "Let Us Sing A Worldwide Anthem"
- 1995: "Here At This Altar"
- 1995: "What A Friend We Have in Jesus, He is Steadfast"
- 1995: "Home of the Open Heart"
- 1995: "This Is My Home"

== Books by Roy Cheville ==
- 1939: The Bible in Everyday Living. Independence, Missouri: Herald House
- 1939: History and Significance of the Family in the Life of the Church. Independence, Missouri: Herald House
- 1941: The Branch of Today and Tomorrow. Independence, Missouri: Herald House
- 1941: Official Zion's League Handbook. The Branch of Today and Tomorrow, Independence, Missouri: Herald House
- 1942: The Role of Religious Education in the Accommodation of a Sect. Independence, Missouri: Herald House
- 1946: Through The West Door, the Story of the First Half Century of Graceland College. Independence, Missouri: Herald House
- 1950: The Hymnal for Youth. Independence, Missouri: Herald House
- 1951: Growing up in religion. Independence, Missouri: Herald House
- 1954: When they seek counsel: A study guide for priesthood who minister to youth when they inquire about marriage. Independence, Missouri: Herald House
- 1955: They Sang of the Restoration. Independence, Missouri: Herald House
- 1955: The Latter Day Saints and Family Life. Independence, Missouri: Herald House
- 1956: By What Authority?. Independence, Missouri: Herald House
- 1958: Ten Considerations for Family Living. Independence, Missouri: Herald House
- 1959: The Field of Theology. Independence, Missouri: Herald House
- 1960: Meet Them in the Scriptures. Independence, Missouri: Herald House
- 1962: Did the Light Go Out?. Independence, Missouri: Herald House
- 1962: Spirituality in the Space Age. Independence, Missouri: Herald House
- 1964: Scriptures from Ancient America. Independence, Missouri: Herald House
- 1968: When Teenagers Talk Theology. Independence, Missouri: Herald House
- 1970: They Made a Difference. Independence, Missouri: Herald House
- 1971: The Book of Mormon Speaks for Itself. Independence, Missouri: Herald House
- 1972: Expectations for Endowed Living: A consideration of the hopes of our people. Independence, Missouri: Herald House
- 1975: Spiritual Resources are Available Today. Independence, Missouri: Herald House
- 1977: Joseph and Emma Companions. Independence, Missouri: Herald House
- 1978: Humor in Gospel Living. Independence, Missouri: Herald House
- 1983: My Endowing Experiences in the Kirtland Temple. Independence, Missouri: Herald House

== Notes ==
Community of Christ titles
Preceded by Elbert A. Smith	Presiding Patriarchs/Evangelist; February 4, 1958 – April 4, 1974	Succeeded by Reed M. Holmes
