= Joseph Smith III =

Son of Joseph Smith Jr and leader of RLDS Church (1832–1914)

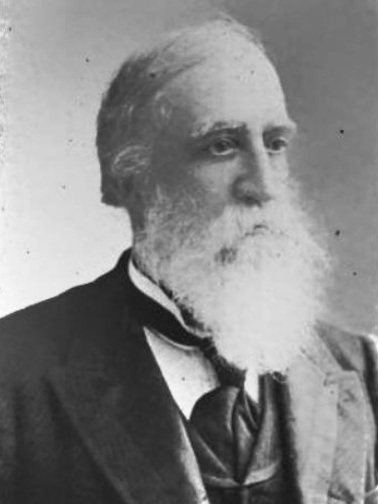

Prophet-President of the Church
- April 6, 1860 – December 10, 1914
- Predecessor: Joseph Smith Jr.
- Successor: Frederick M. Smith
- Reason: Doctrine of Lineal succession

Personal details
- Born: November 6, 1832; Kirtland, Ohio, U.S.
- Died: December 10, 1914 (aged 82); Independence, Missouri, U.S.
- Resting place: Mound Grove Cemetery; 39°6′41.20″N 94°25′34.78″W
- Spouse(s): Emmeline Griswold (m. 1856; died 1869) Bertha Madison (m. 1869; died 1896) Ada R. Clark (m. 1898)
- Children: 15; 5 by Emmeline; 7 by Bertha including Frederick M. Smith; Israel Alexander Smith; 3 by Ada including William Wallace
- Parents: Joseph Smith Jr. Emma Hale Smith
- Signature
- Signature of Joseph Smith III

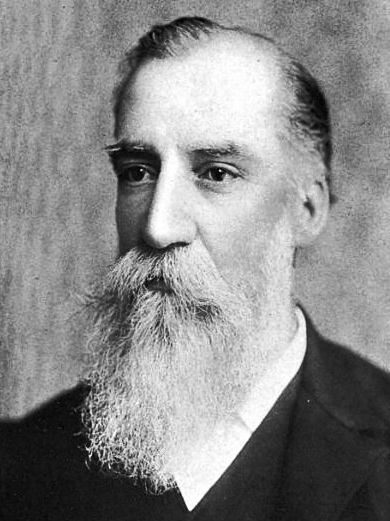
Smith later in his life

Joseph Smith III (November 6, 1832 – December 10, 1914) was the eldest surviving son of Joseph Smith (founder of the Latter Day Saint movement) and Emma Hale Smith. Joseph Smith III was the Prophet-President of what became the Reorganized Church of Jesus Christ of Latter Day Saints (RLDS Church), renamed Community of Christ in 2001, which considers itself a continuation of the church established by Smith's father in 1830. Smith presided over the church for 54 years from 1860 until his death in 1914. Smith's moderate ideas and nature set much of the tone for the church's development, earning him the sobriquet of "the pragmatic prophet".

== Biography ==
=== Childhood ===
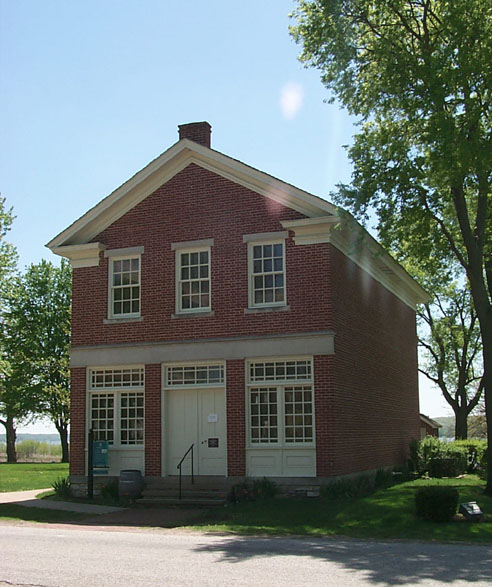
The Red Brick Store in Nauvoo, Illinois

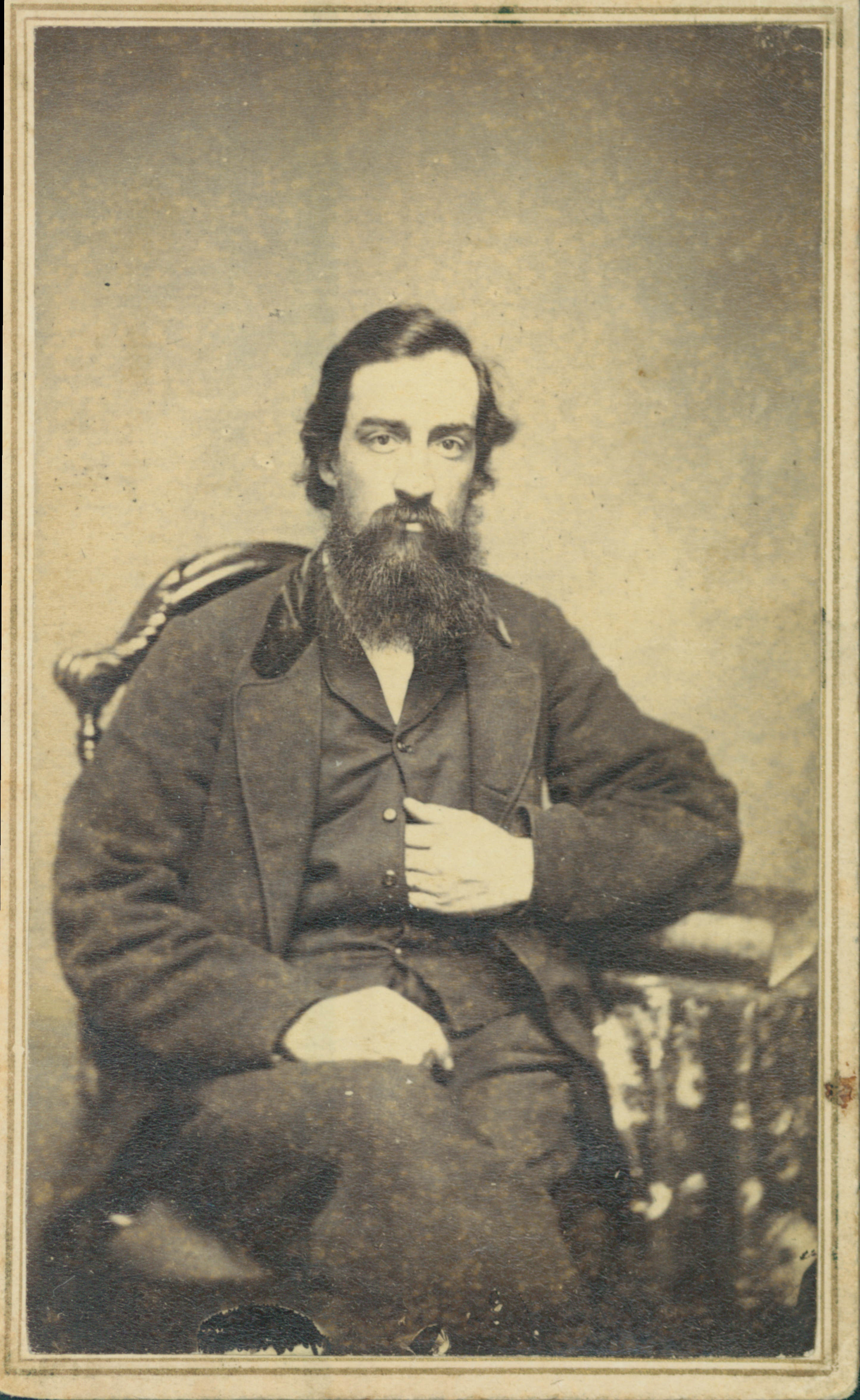
Joseph Smith III

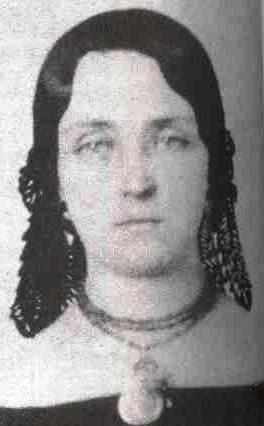
Emmeline Griswold

Joseph Smith III was born in Kirtland, Ohio, on November 6, 1832, to Joseph Smith Jr, and Emma Hale Smith. He moved with his parents to Far West, Missouri, in 1838, where his father was arrested partially as a result of the events in the 1838 Mormon War. Young Joseph was able to stay overnight with his father in prison on several occasions. It was later alleged by fellow prisoner and church apostle Lyman Wight that during one of these visits, his father laid his hands upon Joseph III's head and said, "You are my successor when I depart." While his father was still imprisoned in 1839, Joseph III left Missouri with his mother and siblings and moved to Quincy, Illinois, and later to the new settlement of Nauvoo. The elder Smith escaped custody later that year and rejoined the family.

At Nauvoo, the Latter Day Saints created a militia known as the Nauvoo Legion and soon afterward, 500 of the town's boys created their own junior version of the militia. Joseph III became general of the junior militia whose motto was, "our fathers we respect, our mothers we'll protect."

According to later reminiscences, Joseph III was blessed by his father at a special council meeting of church officials held on the second floor of the Smith family's Red Brick Store in Nauvoo. By some accounts, participants also included Hyrum Smith, John Taylor, Willard Richards, Newel K. Whitney, Reynolds Cahoon, Alpheus Cutler, Ebenezer Robinson, George J. Adams, W. W. Phelps, and John M. Bernhisel. Joseph III's father reportedly seated him in a chair and Whitney anointed his head with oil. Then the elder Smith reportedly pronounced a special blessing upon his son's head that suggested that Joseph III would succeed him as church president if he lived righteously.

Joseph Smith died at Carthage, Illinois, when Joseph III was 11 years old. Although many Latter Day Saints believed that Joseph III should succeed his father, his young age in 1844 made that impractical. A succession crisis ensued which resulted in Brigham Young taking lead of the majority of church members as president of the Quorum of the Twelve Apostles. Three years later Young became the president of the Church of Jesus Christ of Latter-day Saints. Relations between Young and the Smith family were strained and many of the Smiths chose to recognize James J. Strang as church president. Young and the majority of the Latter Day Saints departed Nauvoo in 1846, leaving the Smith family in a mostly empty city. Smith's mother, Emma, attempted to make a living renting out rooms in the family home; in 1847, Emma married a second husband named Lewis Bidamon.

Joseph III began to study and eventually practice law. In 1856, he married Emmeline Griswold and the couple moved into a house that was his parents' first residence in Nauvoo. They had five children: Rebecca, Emma, Carrie, Zaide, and Joseph Arthur. After Emmeline died of probable tuberculosis, he married their housekeeper, Bertha Madison, on November 12, 1869. They had seven children: David Carlos, Mary Audentia, Frederick Madison, Israel "Dutch" Alexander, Kenneth, Bertha Azuba, and Hale. Bertha Madison Smith died from injuries sustained in a carriage accident in 1895. On January 12, 1898, Joseph Smith III wed Ada Rachel Clark of Toronto, Ontario, Canada. They had three sons, William Wallace, Richard Clark, and Reginald Archer.

=== Reorganization of the church ===
In the late 1840s and early 1850s, the bulk of the Latter Day Saints either aligned themselves with Young and emigrated to Utah or they remained in the Midwest and looked to Strang as church president. Strang gave indications that he believed that a son of Joseph Smith would one day lead the church and made overtures to the Smith family. Emma and her sons, however, remained aloof. Many midwestern Latter Day Saints were adamantly opposed to plural marriage and when Strang began to openly practice the doctrine in 1849, several key leaders, including Jason W. Briggs and Zenas H. Gurley, Sr. broke with his leadership. Later, when Strang was mortally wounded by assassins, he refused to name a successor, and when he died he left his church leaderless.

The midwestern Saints began to call for the need to establish a "New Organization" of the church and many believed that Joseph III should be its head. Latter Day Saints repeatedly visited Smith and asked him to take up his father's mantle, but his reply was that he would only assume the church presidency if he were inspired by God to do so. Finally, in 1860, Smith said that he had received this inspiration and at a conference in Amboy, Illinois on April 6, 1860, he was sustained as president of the RLDS Church. Smith III stated at the conference:

I would say to you, brethren, as I hope you may be, and in faith I trust you are, as a people that God has promised his blessings upon, I came not here of myself, but by the influence of the Spirit. For some time past I have received manifestations pointing to the position which I am about to assume. I wish to say that I have come here not to be dictated by any men or set of men. I have come in obedience to a power not my own, and shall be dictated by the power that sent me.

At the time both this organization and Young's Utah-based church claimed to be the true Church of Jesus Christ of Latter Day Saints.

=== President of the church ===
As church president, Smith acted as what biographer Roger D. Launius has called a "pragmatic prophet." Many of RLDS Church followers were dissidents from what they felt were the excesses of a theocracy established by Smith's father, and which they also felt were continued under Young in Utah Territory. From the start, Smith attempted to steer a middle course. Smith taught that the later and more controversial teachings of Smith's father such as baptism for the dead, the divinity of the Book of Abraham, and the concepts of "eternal progression" and the "plurality of gods," were never officially accepted, were misinterpreted, or should simply not be emphasized. Smith repeatedly taught that his father did not teach or practice plural marriage and that this practice was an invention of Young and his followers. Smith also resisted calls from his followers to announce a new gathering place or to quickly "redeem" and build up "Zion" (Independence, Missouri).

In the 1860s and 1870s, Smith began to rebuild the structure of the church, establishing a new First Presidency, Council of Twelve Apostles, seven quorums of the Seventy, and a Presiding Bishopric. Zenas H. Gurley, Sr. became President of the Council of Twelve. Smith presented a revelation which called William Marks, former presiding officer of the church's central stake, to be his first counselor in the reorganized First Presidency. After Marks died, Smith called W. W. Blair and his brother, David Hyrum Smith, to be his counselors in the First Presidency.

In 1866, Smith moved from Nauvoo to Plano, Illinois, where the church's printing house had been established. He personally took over the editorship of The Saint's Herald, and Plano became the headquarters of the church. Meanwhile, Latter Day Saints adhering to the reorganization established a colony in Lamoni, Iowa, where they attempted to practice the "Law of Consecration" or "Order of Enoch." In 1881, Smith decided to move to Lamoni which became the new headquarters of the church. Although the practice of the Order of Enoch proved a failure, the town of Lamoni continued to grow. The church established a college there which became Graceland University.

Under Smith's presidency, the RLDS Church gained clear legal title to the Kirtland Temple in the 1880 Kirtland Temple Suit. However, the RLDS Church failed in its bid to acquire legal title to the Temple Lot in the Temple Lot Case of the late 1890s. The trial court in both cases declared that the RLDS Church was the legal rightful successor to the original Latter Day Saint church founded in 1830 by Smith's father (it failed to gain the Temple Lot because the owners at the time appealed on the grounds that the RLDS Church waited too long to act, but the earlier rightful successor decision was upheld). Rather than focusing on the practical ownership results of the cases, Smith emphasized these court judgements for the remainder of his life as legal validation of the RLDS Church's claims.

=== Redemption of Zion ===
In Smith's final years, members of the church began to move to Independence, Missouri, which Joseph Smith had designated as the "center place" of the "City of Zion." Many Latter Day Saints had wanted to return to this theologically important ground since their expulsion in 1839. In 1906, at the age of 73, Smith moved to Independence and entered a state of semi-retirement. His eldest son, Frederick Madison Smith, remained in Lamoni and took over active leadership of the church. Finally, on December 10, 1914, at the age of 82, Smith suffered a heart seizure in his home and died. He had been president of the church for more than fifty years and he was admired and mourned by thousands.

== Teachings on plural marriage ==
Joseph Smith III was an ardent opponent of the practice of plural marriage throughout his life. For most of his career, Smith denied that his father had been involved in the practice and insisted that it had originated with Brigham Young. Smith served many missions to the western United States where he met with and interviewed associates and women claiming to be widows of his father, who attempted to present him with evidence to the contrary. In the end, Smith concluded that he was "not positive nor sure that [his father] was innocent" and that if, indeed, the elder Smith had been involved, it was still a false practice. However, many members of the Community of Christ, and some of the groups that were formerly associated with it are still not convinced that Joseph Smith III's father did indeed engage in plural marriage, and feel that the evidence that he did so is largely flawed.

== Family chart ==
The inter-relationship of the offices of President of the Church (also known as "Prophet-President") and Presiding Patriarch (also known a Presiding Evangelist) in the Smith family, and the doctrine of Lineal succession, of pre and post-reorganization in the Community of Christ:

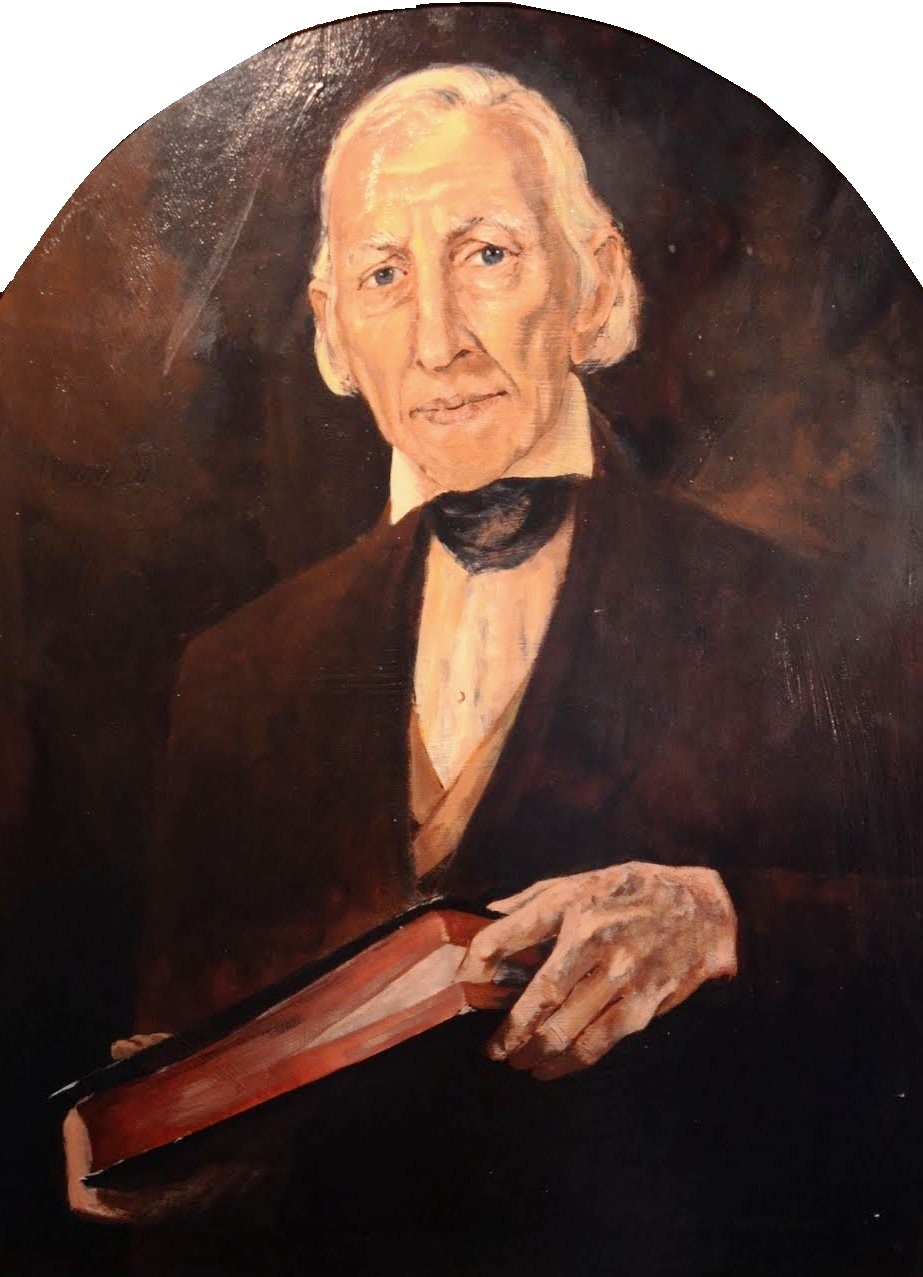
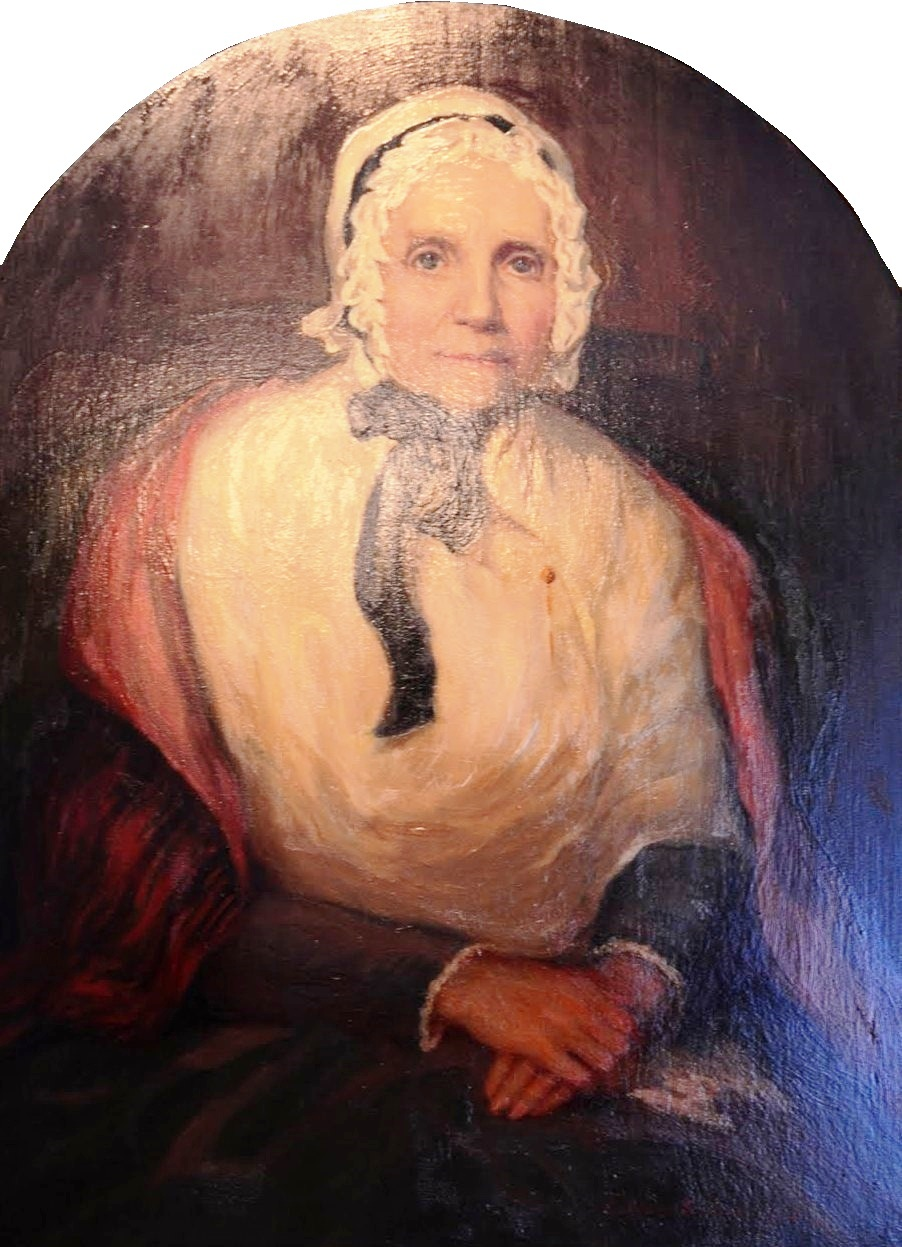
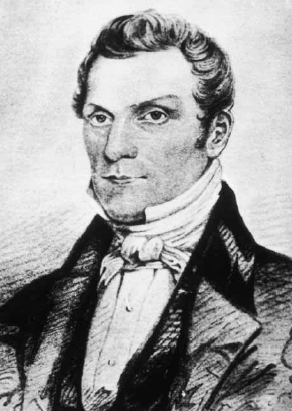
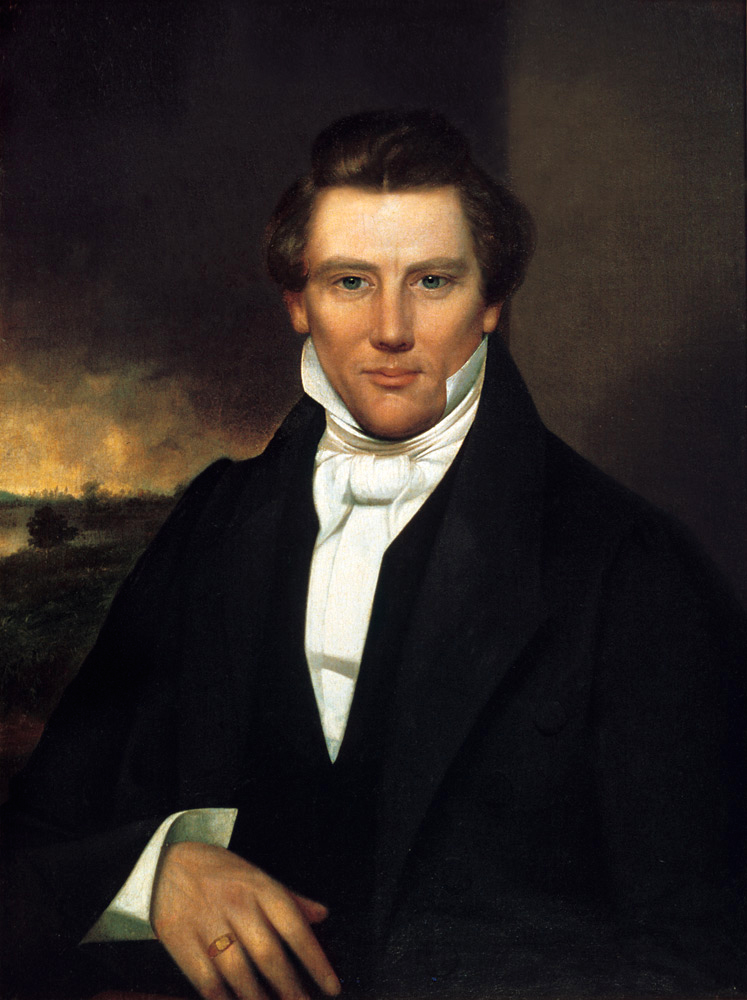
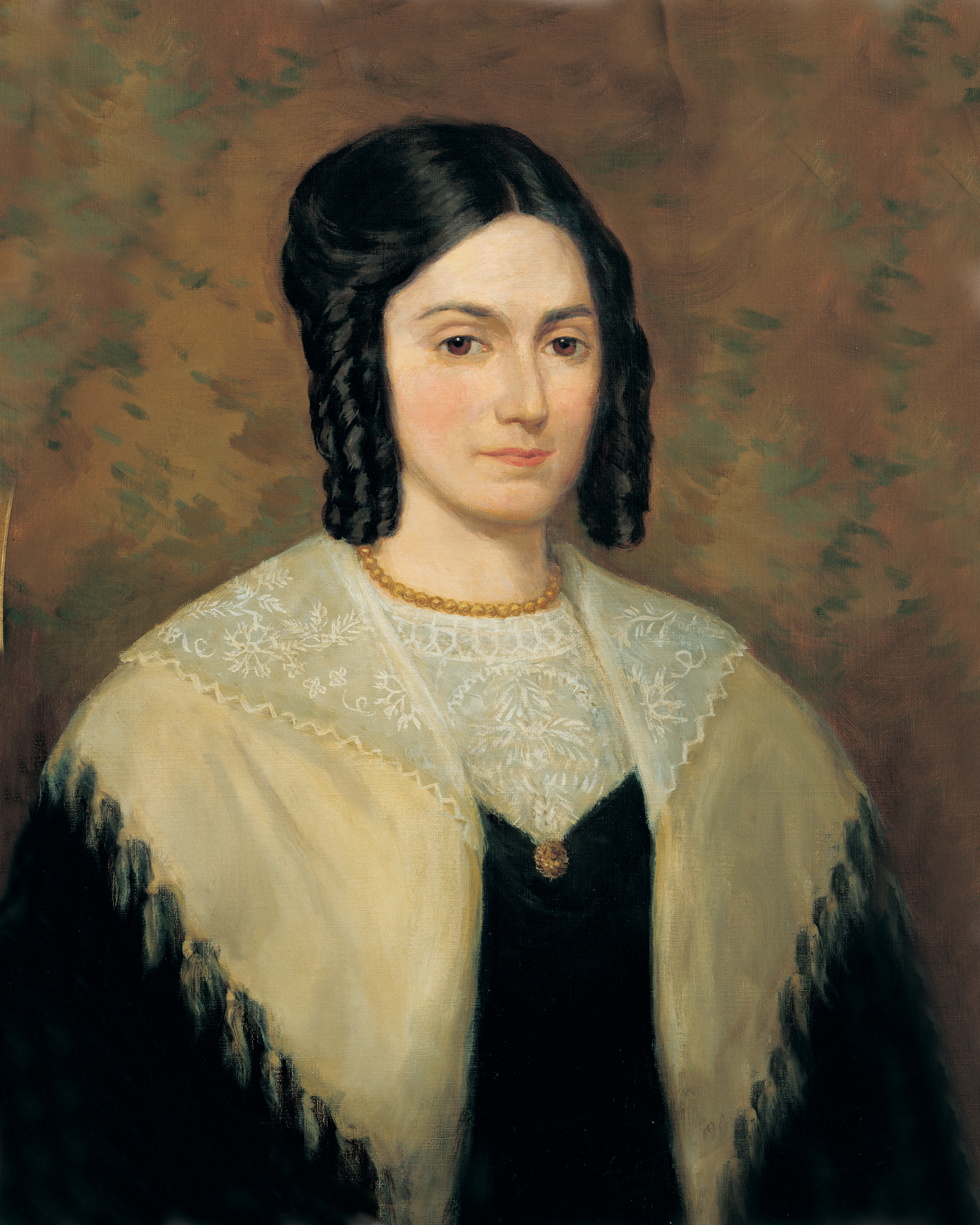
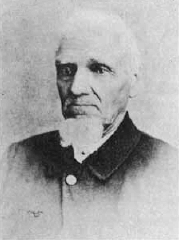
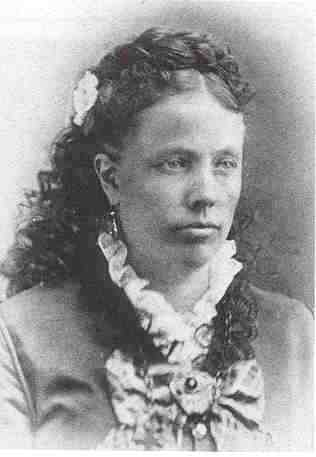
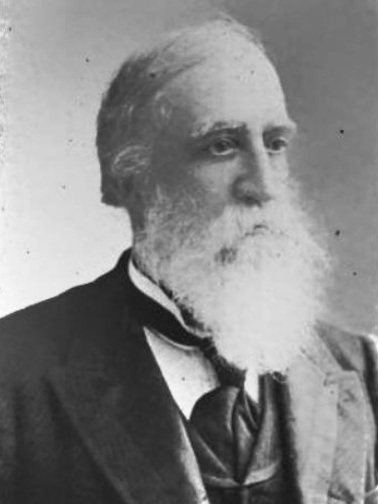
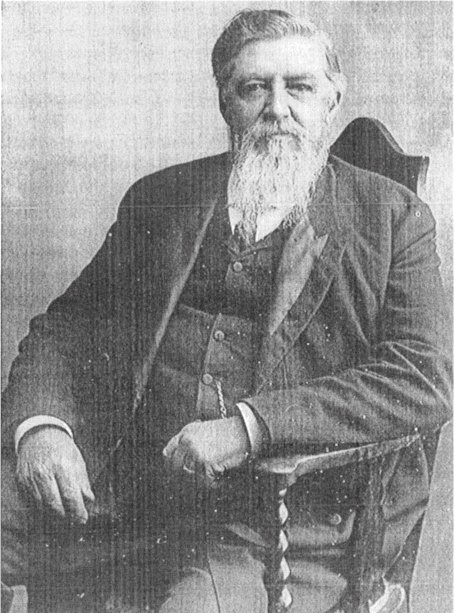
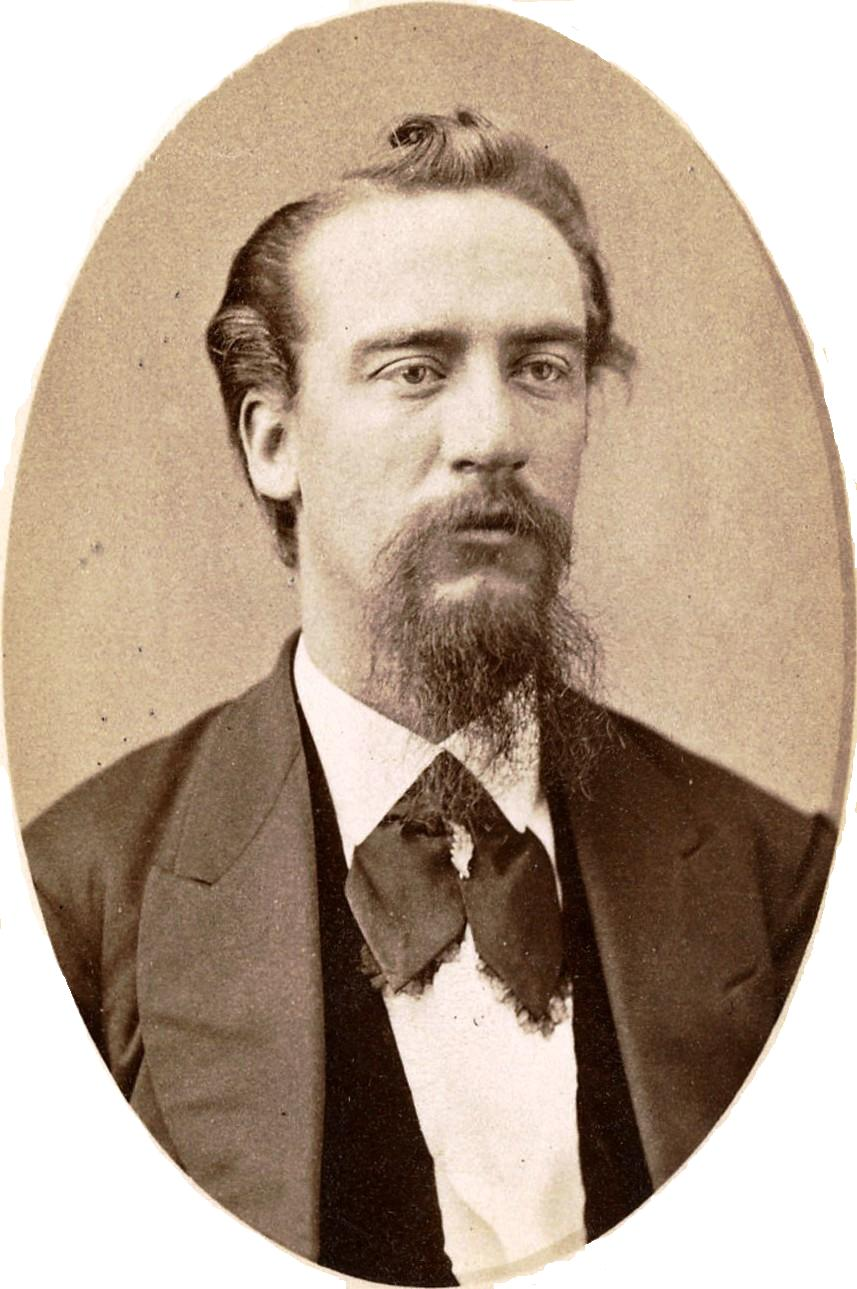
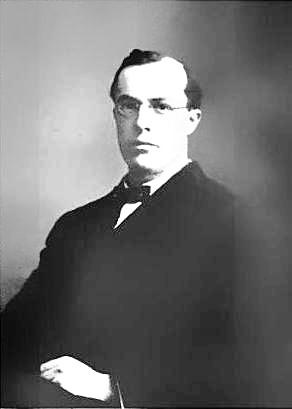
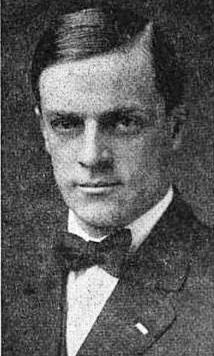
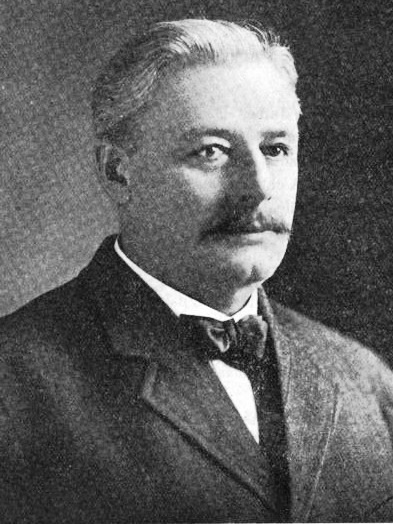
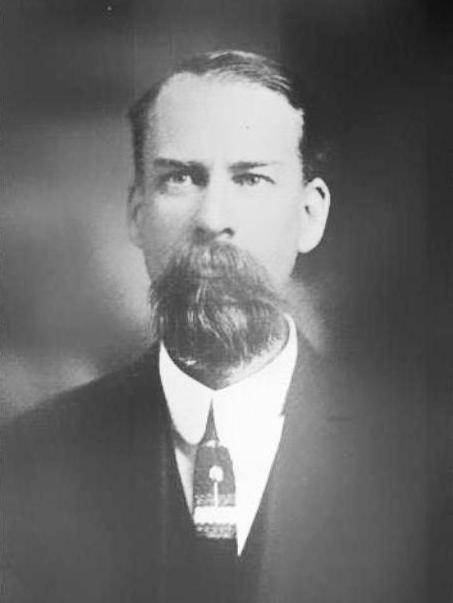
Joseph Smith, Sr. 1771–1840; Presiding Patriarch (1833–1840)	Lucy Mack Smith; 1776–1856
Hyrum Smith; 1800–1844; Presiding Patriarch (1841–1844)	Joseph Smith, Jr. 1805–1844; President of the Church (1830–1844)	Emma Hale Smith; 1804–1879; Elect Lady	William B. Smith; 1811–1893; Presiding Patriarch (1845)
Bertha Madison; 1843–1896	Joseph Smith III; 1832–1914; Prophet-President (1860–1914)	Ada Clark; 1871–1914	Alexander Hale Smith; 1838–1909; Presiding Patriarch (1897–1902)	David Hyrum Smith; 1844–1904
Frederick M. Smith; 1874–1946; Prophet–President (1914–1946)	Israel A. Smith; 1876–1958; Prophet–President (1946–1958)	W. Wallace Smith; 1900–1989; Prophet–President (1958–1978)	Frederick A. Smith; 1862–1954; Presiding Patriarch (1913–1938)	Elbert A. Smith; 1871–1959; Presiding Patriarch (1938–1958)

Community of Christ titles
Preceded by Joseph Smith Jr. as President of the Church of Jesus Christ of Latter Day Saints	Prophet–President; April 6, 1860–December 10, 1914	Succeeded by Frederick M. Smith
