= William Smith (Latter Day Saints) =

American politician

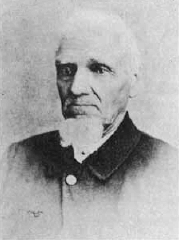

Petitioner for Patriarchate (RLDS Church)
- April 6, 1872 – November 13, 1893
- Called by: Joseph Smith III
- Predecessor: None
- Successor: Alexander Hale Smith
- Reason: Doctrine of Lineal succession

3rd Presiding Patriarch (LDS Church)
- May 24, 1845 – October 6, 1845
- End reason: Removed from position by a vote of the church

Quorum of the Twelve Apostles
- May 25, 1839 – October 6, 1845
- End reason: Removed from Quorum by a vote of the church

Quorum of the Twelve Apostles
- February 15, 1835 – May 4, 1839
- Called by: Three Witnesses
- End reason: Removed from Quorum by a vote of the church

Latter Day Saint Apostle
- February 15, 1835 – October 6, 1845
- Called by: Joseph Smith
- Reason: Initial organization of Quorum of the Twelve
- End reason: Excommunication for apostasy
- Reorganization at end of term: No apostles ordained

Personal details
- Born: March 13, 1811; Royalton, Vermont, United States
- Died: November 13, 1893 (aged 82); Osterdock, Iowa, United States
- Resting place: Osterdock - Bethel Chapel Cemetery

William Smith (also found as William B. Smith) (March 13, 1811 – November 13, 1893) was a leader in the Latter Day Saint movement and one of the original members of the Quorum of the Twelve Apostles. Smith was the eighth child of Joseph Smith Sr. and Lucy Mack Smith and was a younger brother of Joseph Smith Jr., the founder of the Latter Day Saint movement.

After the 1844 murders of Joseph and Hyrum Smith, William Smith claimed leadership of the Latter Day Saints and attracted a small number of followers. Most church members accepted Brigham Young as rightful leader of the church, and Smith was later affiliated with the Strangite and Reorganized Church of Jesus Christ of Latter Day Saints (now the Community of Christ).

== Early life ==
Born in Royalton, Vermont, Smith and his family suffered considerable financial problems and moved several times in the New England area. He was living in the home of his parents near Manchester, New York, when his brother Joseph reported that he had taken golden plates from the hill Cumorah. William was told by Joseph that he could not view the golden plates but was allowed to reach into the case and feel what Joseph said were the plates. William was baptized into the Church of Christ on June 9, 1830, by David Whitmer, one of the Three Witnesses to the Book of Mormon.

== Church leadership ==
On February 14, 1835, the Three Witnesses designated Phineas Young, brother of Brigham, as one of the inaugural members of the Quorum of the Twelve. However, Joseph Smith insisted that his own younger brother, William, be selected instead. Oliver Cowdery and David Whitmer later reported that William's selection was "contrary to our feelings and judgment, and to our deep mortification ever since." William Smith was ordained an apostle on February 15.

On May 4, 1839, Smith and Orson Hyde were suspended from the Quorum of the Twelve by a vote of the church; however, Smith was readmitted to the Quorum on May 25. From April to December 1842, Smith was the editor of The Wasp, a secular but pro-Mormon newspaper in Nauvoo, Illinois. Smith was fierce in his editorial criticism of the anti-Mormon newspaper the Warsaw Signal and its editor Thomas C. Sharp, whom Smith referred to in the Wasp as "Thom-ASS C. Sharp". Smith resigned as the editor of The Wasp after he was elected to the Illinois General Assembly, and he was succeeded by fellow-apostle John Taylor, who edited The Wasp for another five months before replacing it with the Nauvoo Neighbor.

On May 24, 1845, Smith succeeded his late brother Hyrum Smith as the Presiding Patriarch of the church. Shortly after his ordination to this position, Brigham Young printed a clarification in a church newspaper that stated that Smith had not been ordained as patriarch over the church, but rather as patriarch to the church; Smith regarded this clarification as a slight, and it exacerbated the growing tension between Smith and Young. Smith was patriarch to the church until October 6, 1845, when his name and positions were read at general conference, but fellow apostle Parley P. Pratt expressed objections due to his character and practices. The conference attenders unanimously voted against Smith being retained as both an apostle and the patriarch, and he lost both offices and was disfellowshipped from the church. Smith responded by submitting a lengthy statement to Sharp's Warsaw Signal, in which he compared Young to Pontius Pilate and Nero and accused Young and other members of the Twelve of secretly keeping multiple "spiritual wives". As a result of Smith's statement, Smith was excommunicated from the church by Young and the Quorum of the Twelve Apostles on grounds of apostasy on October 19, 1845.

== Relationship with Joseph Smith ==
The relationship between Smith and his older brother Joseph was, at times, quite rocky. William is believed to have physically fought with or attempted to fight with Joseph on more than one occasion. In October 1835, a fist fight between the two was narrowly averted. Weeks later, in December, there was an altercation between the two at a debating school being held in their father's home, and it is said that at the time Joseph died, he was still suffering the physical effects of the beating that he received.

== Later involvement with Latter Day Saint groups ==
As a result of Smith's excommunication, he did not follow Young and the majority of Latter Day Saints who settled in Utah Territory. Rather, Smith followed the leadership of James J. Strang and was involved with the Church of Jesus Christ of Latter Day Saints (Strangite).

In 1847, Smith announced that he was the new president of the Latter Day Saint church and that he held a right to leadership due to the doctrine of lineal succession. He excommunicated Young and the leadership of the LDS Church and announced that the Latter Day Saints who were not in apostasy by following Young should gather in Lee County, Illinois. In 1849, Smith gained the support of Lyman Wight, who led a small group of Latter Day Saints in Texas. However, Smith's church did not last, and within a few years it dissolved.

Smith's relationship with Young remained strained until Young's death in 1877. Smith believed that Young had arranged for William's older brother Samuel to be poisoned in 1844 to prevent his accession to the presidency of the church. However, in 1860, Smith wrote a letter to Young stating that he desired to join the Latter-day Saints in the Salt Lake Valley. Shortly after sending the letter, Smith became involved as a soldier in the American Civil War, and after the war he did not show any interest in moving to Utah Territory.

In 1878, Smith became a member of the Reorganized Church of Jesus Christ of Latter Day Saints (RLDS Church), which was organized in 1860 with Smith's nephew, Joseph Smith III, as its leader. The majority of William Smith's followers also became members of the RLDS Church. While Smith believed that he was entitled to become the presiding patriarch or a member of the Council of Twelve Apostles of the RLDS Church, his nephew did not agree and William Smith remained a high priest in the RLDS Church for the remainder of his life. Today, the Community of Christ sometimes refers to Smith as "Petitioner for RLDS Patriarchate" from April 6, 1872, until his death.

=== Lineal succession ===
The inter-relationship of the offices of President of the Church (also known as "Prophet-President") and Presiding Patriarch (also known a Presiding Evangelist) in the Smith family, and the doctrine of Lineal succession, of pre and post-reorganization in the Community of Christ:

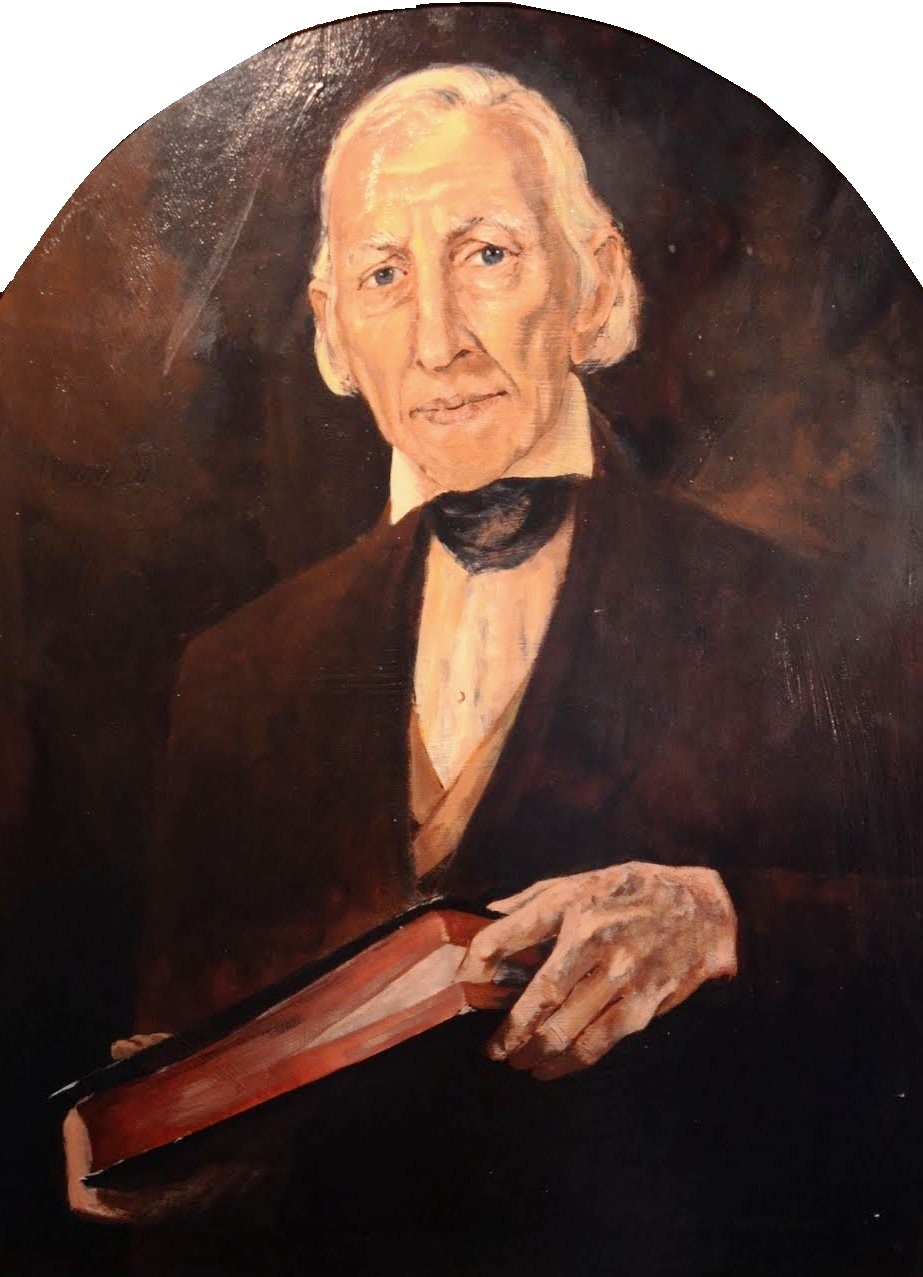
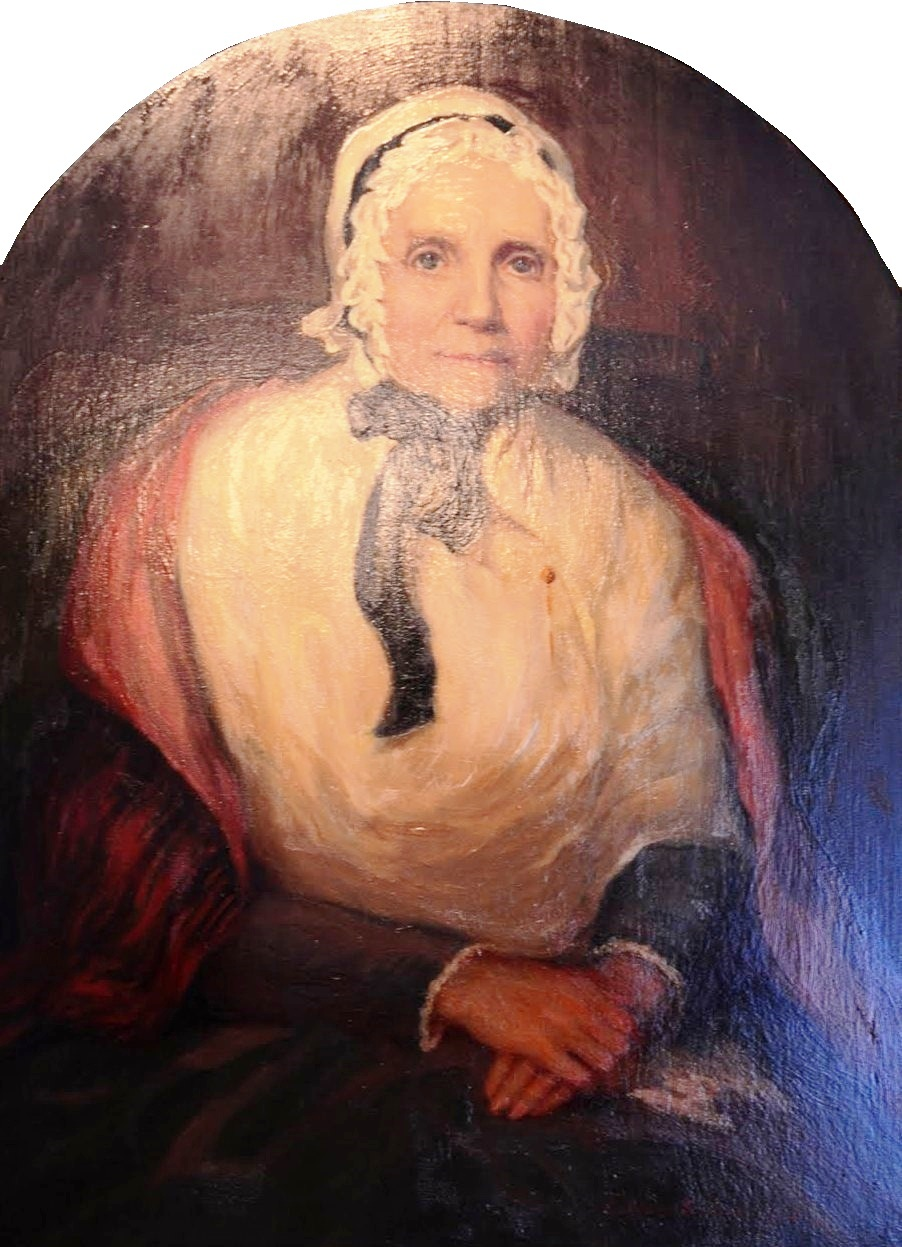
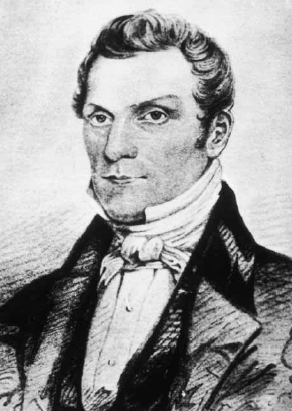
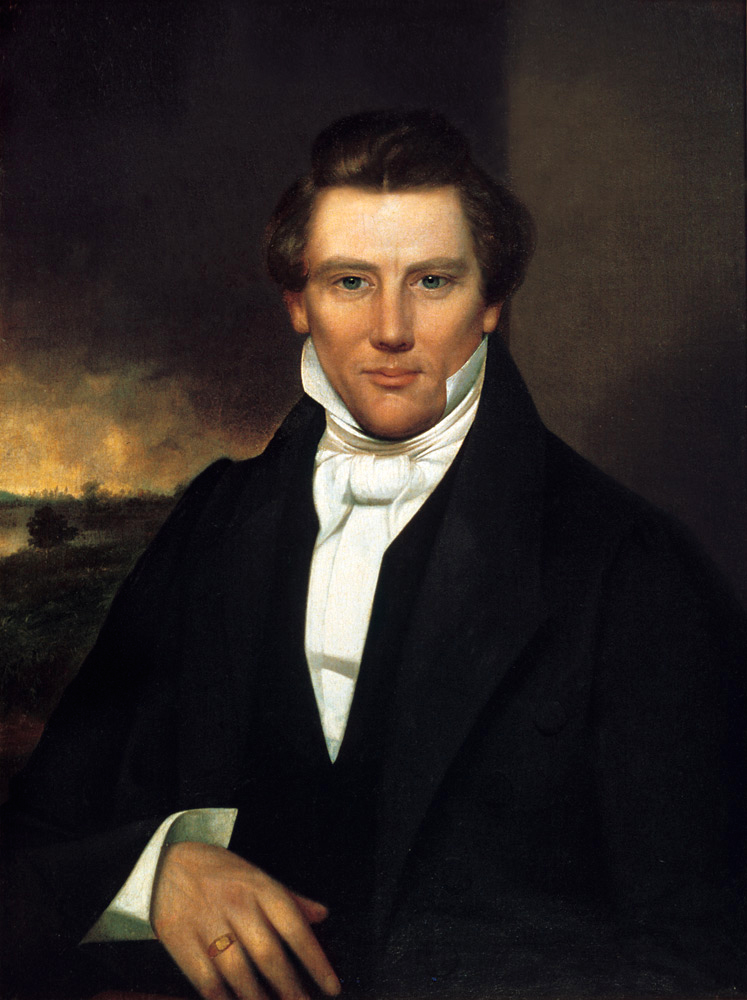
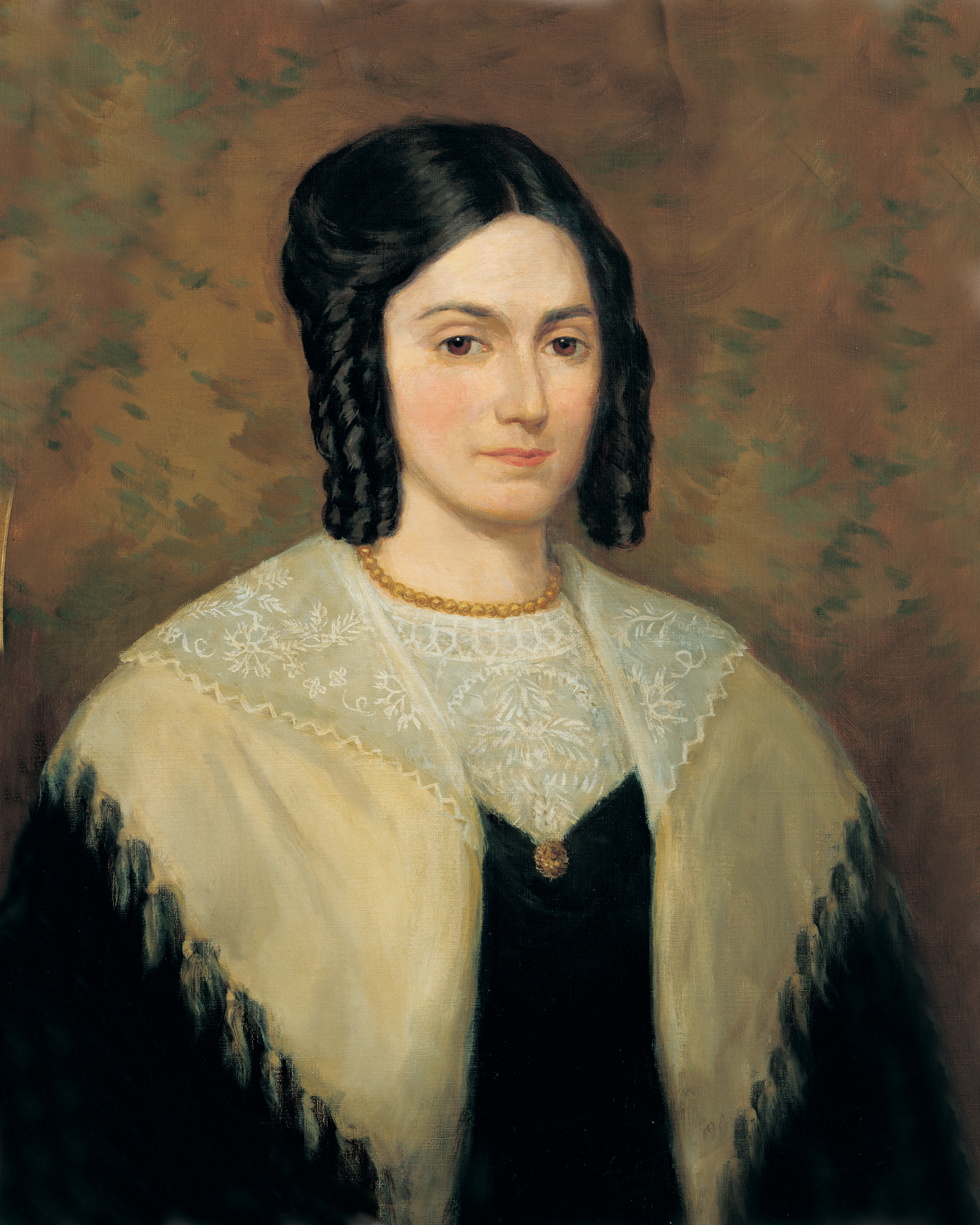
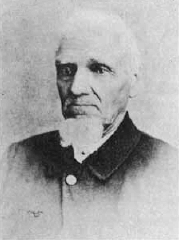
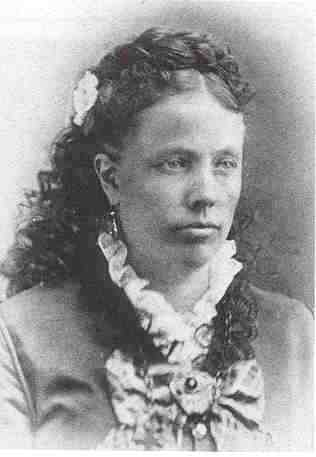
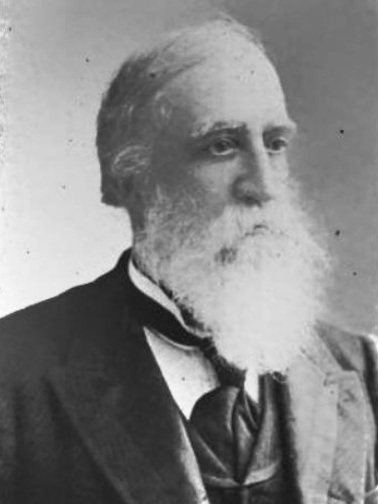
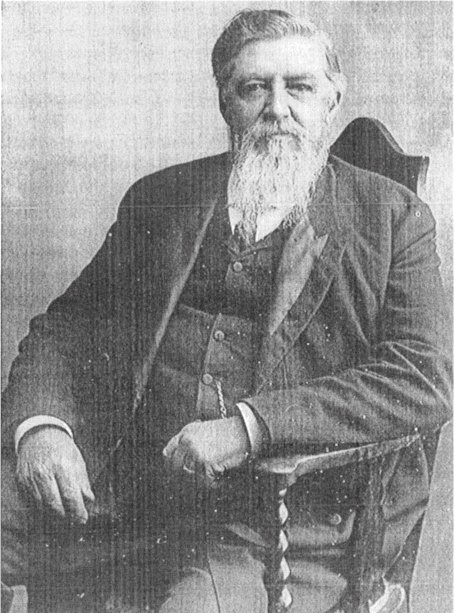
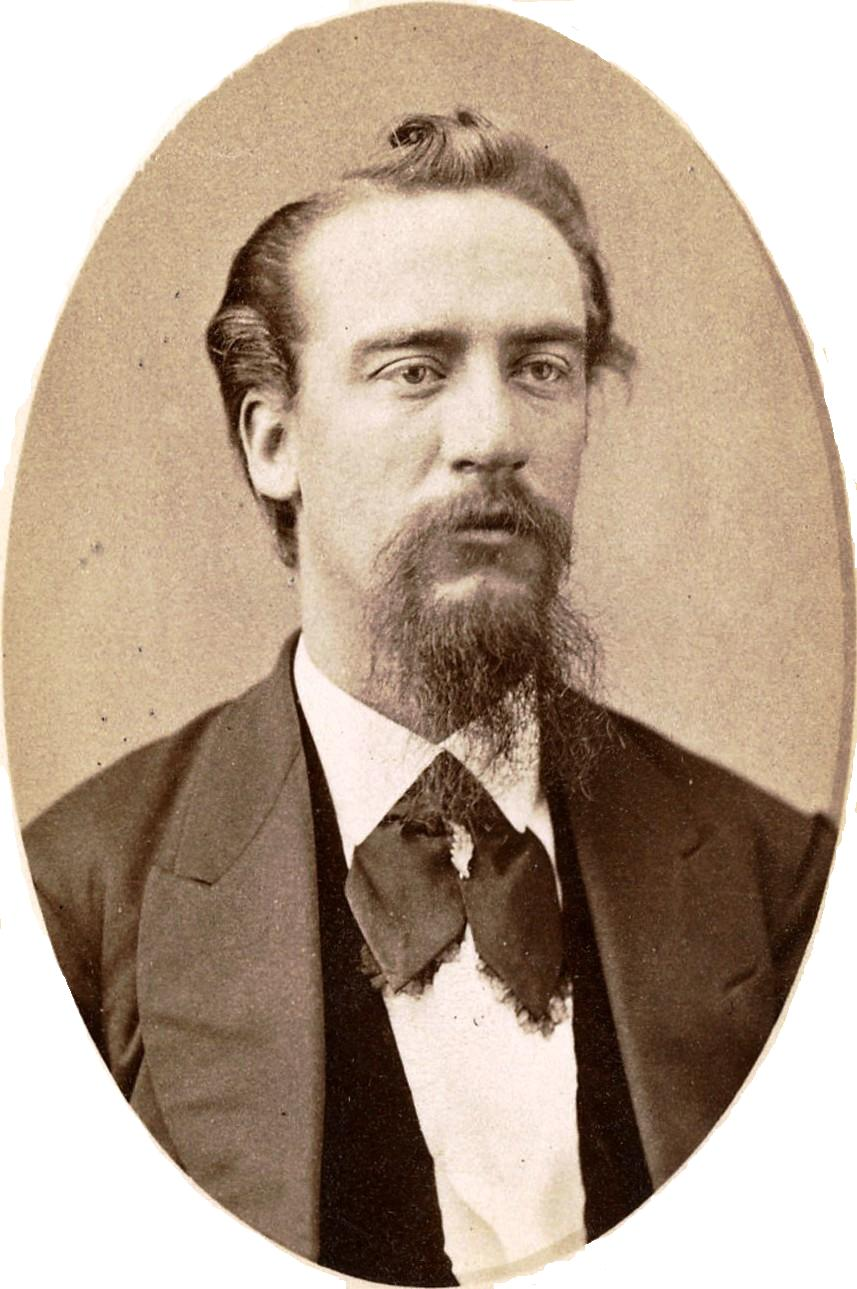
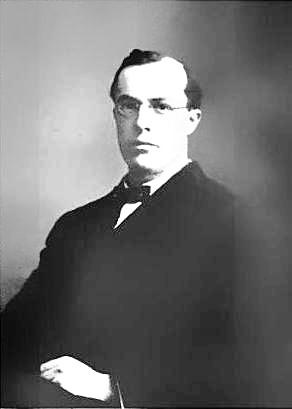
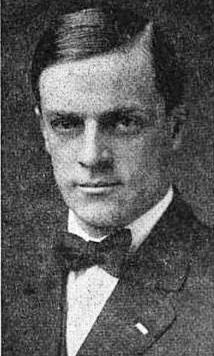
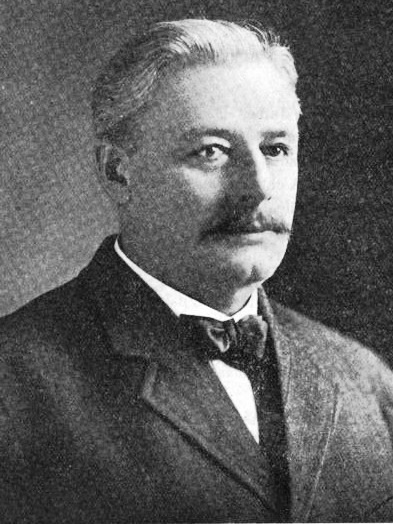
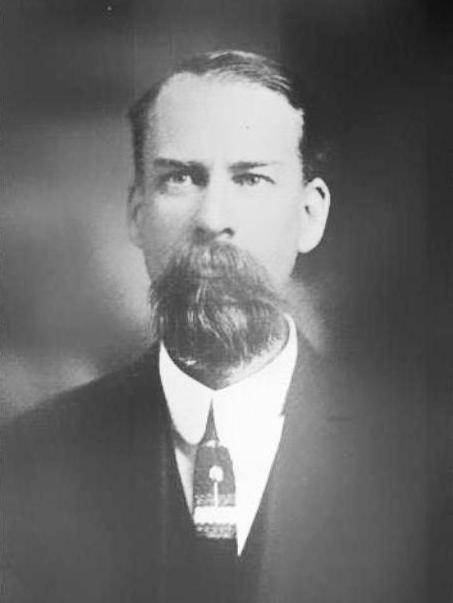
Joseph Smith, Sr. 1771–1840; Presiding Patriarch (1833–1840)	Lucy Mack Smith; 1776–1856
Hyrum Smith; 1800–1844; Presiding Patriarch (1841–1844)	Joseph Smith, Jr. 1805–1844; President of the Church (1830–1844)	Emma Hale Smith; 1804–1879; Elect Lady	William B. Smith; 1811–1893; Presiding Patriarch (1845)
Bertha Madison; 1843–1896	Joseph Smith III; 1832–1914; Prophet-President (1860–1914)	Ada Clark; 1871–1914	Alexander Hale Smith; 1838–1909; Presiding Patriarch (1897–1902)	David Hyrum Smith; 1844–1904
Frederick M. Smith; 1874–1946; Prophet–President (1914–1946)	Israel A. Smith; 1876–1958; Prophet–President (1946–1958)	W. Wallace Smith; 1900–1989; Prophet–President (1958–1978)	Frederick A. Smith; 1862–1954; Presiding Patriarch (1913–1938)	Elbert A. Smith; 1871–1959; Presiding Patriarch (1938–1958)

== Politics ==
Smith served a term in the Illinois General Assembly in 1842 and 1843, being elected to the Illinois House of Representatives as a representative of Hancock County. Smith ran in the election as a Democrat. His chief opponent was Thomas C. Sharp, an anti-Mormon Whig candidate. Smith won the election easily as a result of overwhelming Mormon support from voters in Nauvoo.

== Death ==
When Smith died at Osterdock, Clayton County, Iowa, on November 13, 1893, he was the last brother of Joseph Smith to die. He was survived by his sister Katharine.

== Publications ==
- William Smith (1842-1842, newspaper). The Wasp (Nauvoo, Illinois: LDS Church)
- William Smith (Spring 1844). To the Public. Slander Refuted! An Extract from Church Proceedings; and Expulsion of Mormon Apostates, from the Church! (Philadelphia: self-published)
- William Smith (Spring 1844). Defense of Elder Wm. Smith, Against the Slanders of Abraham Burtis and others (Philadelphia: self-published)
- William Smith (Late 1844). The Elders' Pocket Companion (Location unknown: Self-Published)
- William Smith (June 1845). A Proclamation, and Faithful Warning to all the Saints scattered around... (Galena, Illinois: self-published)
- William Smith (October 1845). Faithful Warning to the Latter Day Saints [shorter version of A Proclamation.] (St. Louis, Missouri: self-published)
- William Smith, Arthur Millikin, and Lucy Millikin (April 1846). To the Public (Nauvoo, Illinois: self-published)
- William Smith (September 1847). William Smith, Patriarch & Prophet of the Most High God – Latter Day Saints, Beware of Imposition! (Ottawa, Illinois: Free Press)
- William Smith (November 1848). A Revelation Given to William Smith, in 1847, on the Apostacy of the Church .... (Philadelphia: self-published)
- William Smith and Isaac Sheen (1849–1850, newspaper). Melchisedek & Aaronic Herald (Covington, Kentucky: Isaac Sheen)
- William Smith et al. (1850) Remonstrance of William Smith et al., of Covington, Kentucky. Against the Admission of Deseret into the Union. (Washington D.C.: U.S. Government)
- William Smith (1883). William Smith on Mormonism: A True Account of the Origin of the Book of Mormon (Lamoni, Iowa: RLDS Church)

== See also ==
- Phrenology and the Latter Day Saint Movement

== Notes ==
Reorganized Church of Jesus Christ of Latter Day Saints titles Later renamed: Community of Christ (2001)
Preceded by Hyrum Smith	Petitioner for RLDS Patriarchate; April 6, 1872 – November 13, 1893	Succeeded by Alexander H. Smith
The Church of Jesus Christ of Latter-day Saints titles
Preceded by Hyrum Smith	Presiding Patriarch; May 24, 1845 – October 19, 1845	Succeeded by John Smith
Church of Jesus Christ of Latter Day Saints titles Later renamed: The Church of Jesus Christ of Latter-day Saints (1844)
Preceded by Orson Hyde	Quorum of the Twelve Apostles; May 25, 1839–19 October 1845	Succeeded by Willard Richards
Church of Christ titles Later renamed: Church of the Latter Day Saints (1834) and Church of Jesus Christ of Latter Day Saints (1838)
Preceded by Luke S. Johnson	Quorum of the Twelve Apostles; February 15, 1835 – May 4, 1839	Succeeded by Orson Pratt
