= Patriarchal priesthood =

The patriarchal priesthood (or Abrahamic priesthood) is associated with the patriarchal order found in Mormonism and is especially connected with celestial marriage.

In the largest Latter Day Saint denomination, the Church of Jesus Christ of Latter-day Saints (LDS Church), the patriarchal priesthood is sometimes confused as one of the types or "orders" of priesthood, however, there are only two orders: the Aaronic priesthood and the Melchizedek priesthood; the patriarchal priesthood should also not be confused with the calling of the patriarch. Boyd K. Packer, an LDS Church apostle, has explained that the patriarchal priesthood is included in the Melchizedek priesthood:

There are references to a patriarchal priesthood. The patriarchal order is not a third, separate priesthood. (See D&C 84:6–17; D&C 107:40–57.) Whatever relates to the patriarchal order is embraced in the Melchizedek Priesthood. "All other authorities or offices in the church are appendages to [the Melchizedek] priesthood." (D&C 107:5.) The patriarchal order is a part of the Melchizedek Priesthood which enables endowed and worthy men to preside over their posterity in time and eternity.

— Packer, Boyd K. (February 1993), Ensign, "What Every Elder Should Know—and Every Sister as Well: A Primer on Principles of Priesthood Government"

== History ==
In Nauvoo, Illinois on August 27, 1843, while the Nauvoo Temple was being constructed, Joseph Smith, the first president of the restored Church of Christ, taught, using Hebrews 7 as background material, the "Three Grand Orders" of priesthood:

There are three grand orders of priesthood referred to here.

1st. The King of Shiloam (Salem) had power and authority over that of Abraham, holding the key and the power of endless life .... The Melchizedek Priesthood holds the right from the eternal God, and not by descent from father and mother; and that priesthood is as eternal as God Himself, having neither beginning of days nor end of life.

The 2nd Priesthood is Patriarchal authority. Go to and finish the temple, and God will fill it with power, and you will then receive more knowledge concerning this priesthood.

The 3rd is what is called the Levitical Priesthood, consisting of priests to administer in outward ordinances, made without an oath; but the Priesthood of Melchizedek is by an oath and covenant.

The Holy Ghost is God's messenger to administer in all those priesthoods.

Eight years earlier, Smith had dictated a revelation that declared, "There are, in the church, two priesthoods, namely, the Melchizedek and Aaronic, including the Levitical Priesthood". At the time of the 1843 Nauvoo discourse, the temple was under construction and Smith declared that knowledge of the "patriarchal authority" would be revealed in the temple.

The Nauvoo Temple was constructed by 1844 and dedicated in 1846 by Orson Hyde. It was the first Latter Day Saint temple where the ordinance of celestial marriage was practiced.

The oath of the priesthood referenced in Hebrews 7:20–21, 7:28 was revealed to Smith in a revelation in Kirtland, Ohio on September 22 and 23, 1832. This revelation is contained in the section 84 of the Doctrine and Covenants and is referred to as the oath and covenant of the priesthood. It includes the following promise that has relation to the doctrine of exaltation.

"They become the sons of Moses and of Aaron and the seed of Abraham, and the church and kingdom, and the elect of God.
"And also all they who receive this priesthood receive me, saith the Lord;
"For he that receiveth my servants receiveth me;
"And he that receiveth me receiveth my Father;
"And he that receiveth my Father receiveth my Father’s kingdom; therefore all that my Father hath shall be given unto him.
"And this is according to the oath and covenant which belongeth to the priesthood."

Bruce R. McConkie wrote regarding the subject:

"Those who shall hereafter rule and reign in eternity as exalted beings will form a patriarchal chain which will begin with Father Adam and spread out until every exalted person is linked in. Exaltation consists in the continuation of the family unit in eternity, and every family which so continues will find its proper place in the eternal organizational framework which the Almighty has ordained. None will be forgotten. Unworthy mortal links will be dropped in eternity, for there is no family in which all generations will attain exaltation; later generations of worthy families will be welded into the links formed by their ancestors who became worthy of a like exaltation with them. All those after the day of Abraham (of whatever literal lineage they may be) who so live as to be worthy of a place in this great patriarchal chain will be welded into Abraham's lineage and shall rise up and bless him as their father."

The word "patriarch" means "Father-Ruler" and part of the doctrine of the LDS Church is that there cannot be a patriarch without a matriarch. Latter-day Saints believe that a man and a woman can be joined in marriage for all eternity if done with the proper authority and in the temple. This celestial marriage is at the heart of the patriarchal order of the priesthood.

== See also ==
- Lineal succession (Mormonism)
