= List of churches in the Latter Day Saint Reorganization movement =

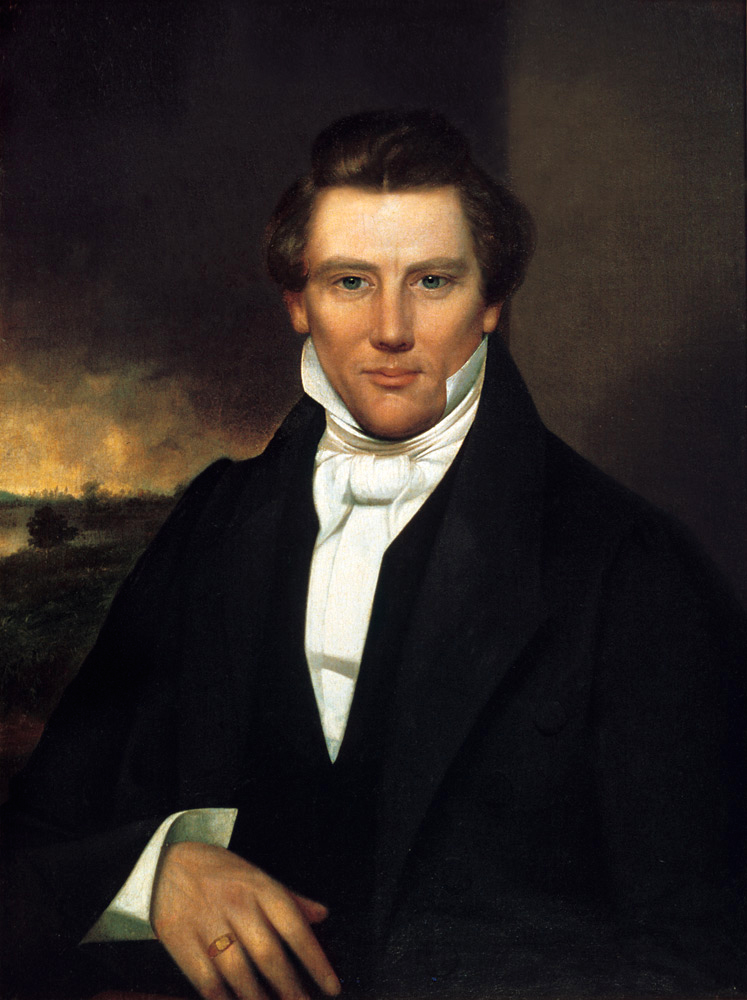
Portrait based on an alleged daguerreotype of Joseph Smith, founder of the Latter Day Saint movement

Reorganized Latter Day Saints churches are Latter Day Saint denominations that reject the allegedly apostolic succession of Brigham Young.

Estimated membership of larger denominations in the Reorganization movement and its fellow travelers
Community of Christ (RLDS)	250,301	over 75%
The Church of Jesus Christ (Bickertonite)	22,537	less than 7.5%
Church of Jesus Christ with the Elijah Message	12,500	less than 5%
Restoration Branches	10,000	over 2.5%
Church of Christ (Temple Lot)	7,310	less than 2.5%
Covenant Christians (also known as Fellowships of the remnants)	5,000	over 1%
Church of Christ (Fettingite)	2,450	less than 1%

== List ==
=== Reorganization movement ===
	Name	Organized by	Date	Current status	Notes
Independence Temple, Community of Christ, Independence, MO	Community of Christ	Joseph Smith III	1860	Reorganized from the Church of Jesus Christ of Latter Day Saints; some early members came from Strangite church. More than 250,000 members as of 2006	Second-largest Latter Day Saint denomination. Headquartered in Independence, Missouri. Previously known as the "Reorganized Church of Jesus Christ of Latter Day Saints" (RLDS Church); organized by Joseph Smith III in 1860.
R. C. Evans, founder of Church of the Christian Brotherhood	Church of the Christian Brotherhood	R. C. Evans	1918	Defunct	Split with RLDS Church due to their denial that Joseph Smith practiced plural marriage; Evans published a book documenting evidence that Smith was a polygamist, then went on to reject most of the tenets of Mormonism.
	Church of Jesus Christ Restored	Stanley King	1960s	Headquartered in Ontario, Canada	Fundamentalist church that split from the RLDS Church and instituted polygamy and the United Order; has about 40 members
	Church of Jesus Christ (Toneyite)	Forrest Toney	1980	Headquartered in Independence, Missouri	Left RLDS Church in 1980; claimed to be "Elijah and only prophet" of his organization.
Outreach Restoration Branch, Independence, Missouri. Previously the location of now-defunct Church of Christ (Hancock)	Independent RLDS / Restoration Branches	Various local leaders of the RLDS church	1980s	As of 1993, 15,000–30,000 sympathizers who yet retained membership in the RLDS Church (Community of Christ); as of 2011, c. 10,000 members attending several hundred distinct congregations.	Affiliated branches and study groups, with each branch relatively autonomous and the movement as a whole centered in Independence, Missouri. RLDS Church branches became independent of the RLDS Church individually throughout the 1980s, due to opposition to changes in church doctrines and practices. Most priesthood holders of these branches soon became affiliated with the "Conference of Restoration Elders". At a three-day conference in November 2005, the "Joint Conference of Restoration Branches" was formed, which had 6,000 to 7,000 members as of 2010. Members consider themselves members of the [historical] RLDS Church, in a direct line of succession from those who dissented following doctrinal changes roughly coinciding with the church's name change to Community of Christ.
	Church of Jesus Christ Restored 1830	Nolan W. Glauner	Mid-1980s	Members in Missouri and Africa; headquartered in Tarkio, Missouri	Regards Wallace B. Smith as a "fallen prophet" of the RLDS Church for his opening the priesthood to women and for choosing to build the Independence Temple as opposed to the city of Zion.
	Church of Christ	David B. Clark	1985	Headquartered in Oak Grove, Missouri	Also known as "Lion of God Ministry". Clark broke from the RLDS Church in November 1985. In May 1987, Clark began to issue a newsletter, "The Return". Group adheres closely to the King James Version of the Bible and "The Record of the Nephites" [Book of Mormon], but does not consider other Mormon scripture to be authoritative. They keep annual feasts, including Passover, Pentecost, Tabernacles, etc.
Meetinghouse, Church of Jesus Christ (Zion's Branch), Independence, Missouri	Church of Jesus Christ (Zion's Branch)	John and Robert Cato, among others	1986	200 or so members; headquartered in Independence, Missouri	Largely composed of former members of the RLDS Church who oppose what they consider to be recent doctrinal innovations, especially the giving of the priesthood to women in 1984.
	Lundgren Group	Jeffrey Lundgren	1988	Defunct; approximately 20 followers; was located in Kirtland, Ohio	The denomination broke off from the RLDS Church when Lundgren was dismissed from the church on October 10, 1988. Lundgren was executed by the state of Ohio on October 24, 2006, for the murder of Dennis Avery and four of his family members.
Meetinghouse, Restoration Church of Jesus Christ of Latter Day Saints, Independence, Missouri	Restoration Church of Jesus Christ of Latter Day Saints	Several RLDS entities	1991	Headquartered in Independence, Missouri	The church broke off from the Community of Christ because of its belief that women should not hold the priesthood.
Headquarters of the Remnant Church of Jesus Christ of Latter Day Saints, Independence, Missouri	Remnant Church of Jesus Christ of Latter Day Saints	Frederick N. Larsen	2000	Independent RLDS / Restoration Branches	1,000–2,000 members; headquartered in Independence, Missouri. Chiefly composed of former members of the RLDS Church who were part of the Independent RLDS / Restoration Branches. They oppose what they consider to be recent doctrinal innovations, especially the passing of the church presidency to someone not descended from Joseph Smith (Larsen is a descendant of Smith through his grandson Frederick Madison Smith).

Gallery

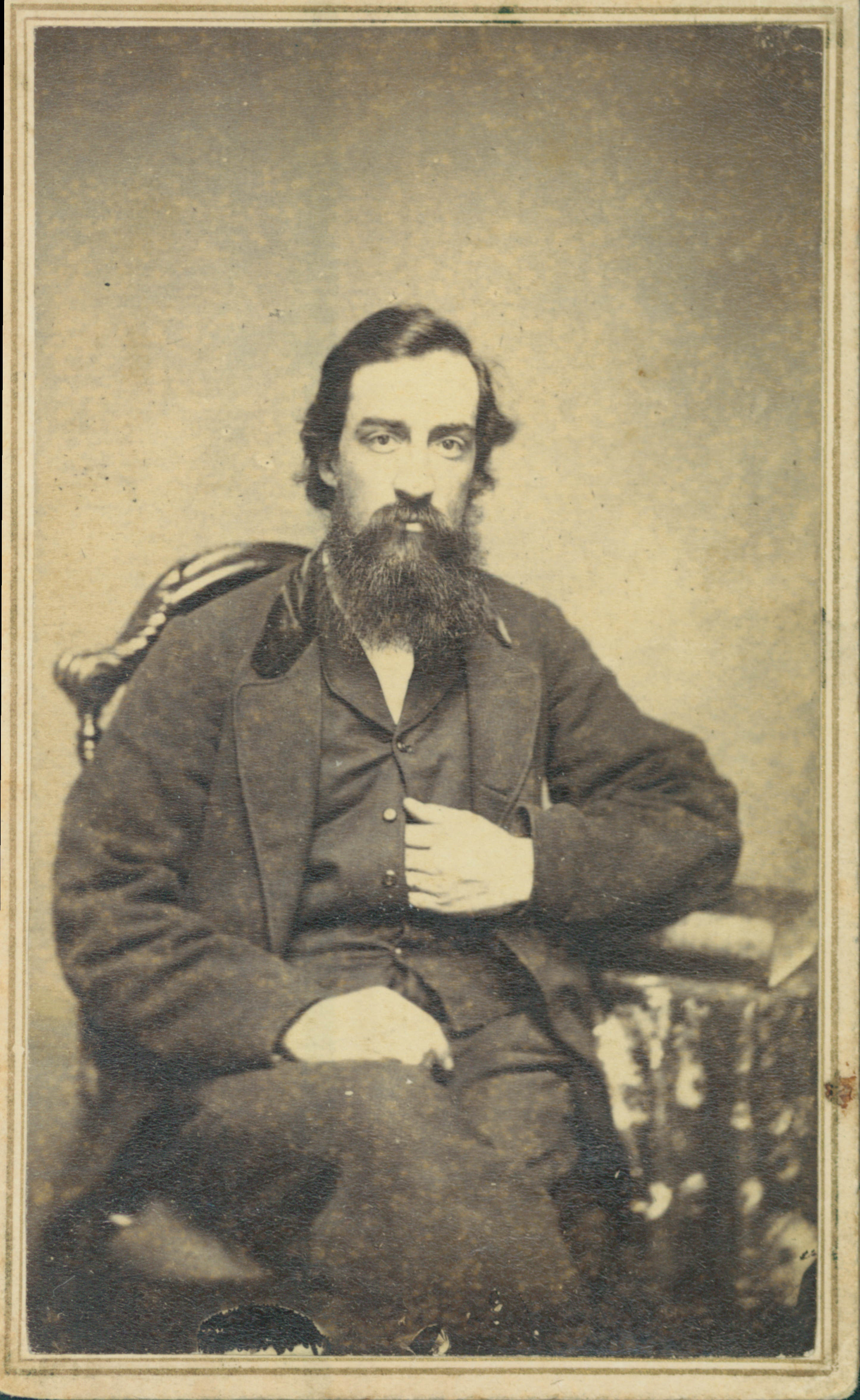
Joseph Smith III
(1832–1914)

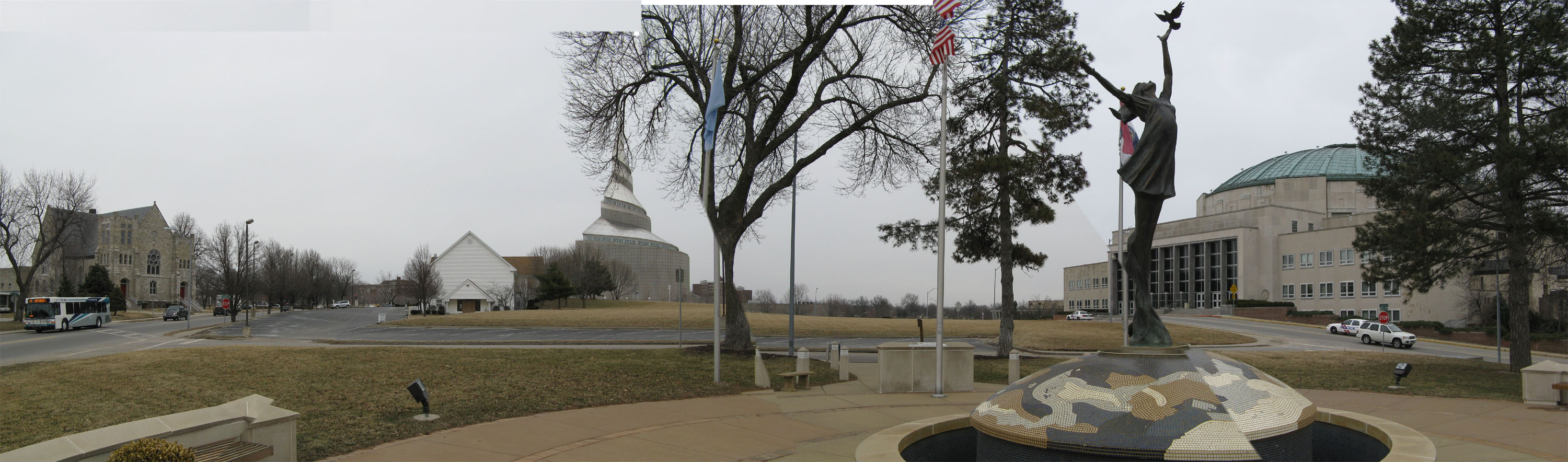
Panorama of the Temple Lot in Independence, with (L to R) the Stone Church, the Temple Lot Church, the Independence Temple, and the Auditorium

=== Temple Lot-derived ===
These include:

	Name	Organized by	Date	Current status	Notes
World Headquarters and Independence Branch, Church of Christ (Temple Lot), Independence, Missouri	Church of Christ (Temple Lot)	Granville Hedrick	1863	(Some members from Gladdenites.) 5,000 members; headquartered on the Temple Lot in Independence, Missouri	Owns the Temple Lot; adherents commonly referred to as "Hedrickites."
Meetinghouse, Church of Christ (Fettingite), Independence, Missouri	Church of Christ (Fettingite)	Otto Fetting	1929	Denomination divided into various factions	A denomination which split with the Temple Lot church over reported revelations from John the Baptist to its founder, Otto Fetting; adopted seventh day sabbatarianism under Apostle S.T. Bronson in 1950s.
Otto Fetting	Church of Christ at Halley's Bluff	Thomas B. Nerren and E. E. Long	1932	Headquartered at Schell City, Missouri; less than 100 members	Members originally believed Otto Fetting's revelations but did not join the Church of Christ (Fettingite). Formally named "Church of Christ at Zion's Retreat" until a 1972 schism in which Dan Gayman led most of its followers away to his Church of Israel.
Meetinghouse, Church of Christ (Restored), Independence, Missouri	Church of Christ (Restored)	A.C. DeWolf	ca. 1937	Louisiana, Mississippi, Missouri;approx. 450 members	Split from Fettingite organization in late 1930s when that denomination initially accepted William Draves' "messages"; claims to be the true continuation of Fetting's church. Non-sabbatarian.
Headquarters and Independence Branch, Church of Christ with the Elijah Message, Independence, Missouri	Church of Christ with the Elijah Message	Otto Fetting and William Draves	1943	c. 12,500 members worldwide as of 1987. Headquartered in Independence, Missouri	Split with the Church of Christ (Fettingite) when that denomination rejected revelations from John the Baptist given to its founder, William Draves, following the death of Otto Fetting.
	Church of Christ (Hancock)	Pauline Hancock	1946	Defunct as of 1984	First Latter Day Saint denomination to be established by a woman; accepted KJV Bible and Book of Mormon only; later rejected Book of Mormon and dissolved itself in 1984. Among its former members were Jerald and Sandra Tanner, opponents of the Latter Day Saint movement and founders of the Utah Lighthouse Ministry.
	Church of Christ	Howard Leighton-Floyd and H. H. Burt	1965	Around 35 members	Leighton-Floyd and Burt split with the Church of Christ with the Elijah Message during the reincorporation of that church under its present name. Leighton-Floyd left shortly after the formation, with Burt assumed leadership of the group. The membership is centered on an agricultural cooperative near Holden, Missouri.
	Church of Israel	Dan Gayman	1972	Headquartered in Missouri	(From Church of Christ at Halley's Bluff.) Name was "Church of Our Christian Heritage" until incorporation in 1981. The church has been accused of being a Christian Identity church, a charge which is denied by Gayman. Few Latter Day Saint beliefs or practices remain in the church.
Church of Christ with the Elijah Message (Assured Way of the Lord), Inc., Independence, Missouri	The Church of Christ With the Elijah Message, The Assured Way of the Lord, Inc.	Leonard Draves	2004	Headquartered in Independence, Missouri	Split from the Church of Christ with the Elijah Message, Inc., which in turn split from the Church of Christ With the Elijah Message; founders claim that they are the legitimate continuation of William Draves' organization.

=== Fellow travellers among additional Latter Day Saint lineages ===
Non-Joseph Smith III-lineaged churches that also reject Brigham Young's succession include:

- Church of Jesus Christ of Latter Day Saints (Strangite), founded in 1844
- "Rigdonites", formed beginning in 1844
- Church of Christ (Wightite), founded in 1844
- Church of Christ (Whitmerite), founded in 1847
- Church of Christ (Brewsterite), founded in 1848
- Church of Jesus Christ of Latter Day Saints (Gladdenite), founded in 1851
- Church of Jesus Christ (Cutlerite), founded in 1853
- Reorganized Church of Jesus Christ (Bickertonite), founded in 1907
- Fellowships of the remnants, also known as Covenant Christians, founded in 2013

== Background ==
After the founder of the Latter Day Saint movement, Joseph Smith, Jr., was killed, the membership of Smith's church were disputed among themselves over the question of succession. Several individuals emerged with claims to leadership and the church's presidency. This led to the formation of several small factions. The majority of the church's members in Nauvoo, Illinois followed Brigham Young, who led them to the Great Basin area (in what is now Utah) as the Church of Jesus Christ of Latter-day Saints (LDS Church. Also, the term "Mormon" gradually primarily came to refer to members of the LDS Church.) The remaining individuals—who still considered themselves part of Smith's original church—remained; many who were in scattered congregations throughout the American Midwest joined other factions led by such leaders as Sidney Rigdon, James J. Strang, Lyman Wight, Alpheus Cutler, William Smith, and David Whitmer. Others began forming themselves into the a "reorganized" Church of Jesus Christ of Latter Day Saints.

Some Latter Day Saints believed that Smith had designated his eldest son, Joseph Smith III, as his successor; some of these individuals waited for young Joseph to take up his father's mantle. However, Smith III was only 11 years old at the time of his father's death; his mother, Emma Hale Smith, and their family remained in Nauvoo rather than moving to join any of the departing groups. In the 1850s, groups of Midwestern Latter Day Saints who were unaffiliated with other Latter Day Saint factions began to come together. Leaders, including Jason W. Briggs and Zenas H. Gurley, Sr., began to call for the creation of a "New Organization" of the Latter Day Saint movement. They invited Smith III to lead their New Organization; he accepted only after he believed he received a personal spiritual confirmation that this was the appropriate course of action. At a conference on April 6, 1860, at Amboy, Illinois, Smith III formally accepted the leadership of what was then known as the Church of Jesus Christ of Latter Day Saints. William Marks, former stake president of Nauvoo, served as Smith III's counselor in the reorganized First Presidency. The word "Reorganized" was added to the church's official name in 1872, mostly as a means of distinguishing it from the larger LDS Church, which at that time was involved in controversy with the U.S. government over its doctrine of plural marriage. The Reorganized Church of Jesus Christ of Latter Day Saints was often abbreviated "RLDS Church". Over time, many Mormons, mostly in the Midwest, who had not accompanied Brigham Young and his Latter-Day Saint followers to what is now Utah, began to join the new and growing Church. They included many former followers of James Strang, whose assassination in Wisconsin in 1856 left them disorganized and leaderless.

== See also ==
- List of denominations in the Latter Day Saint movement#Reorganized Church and other followers of Joseph Smith III ("Josephites")
- Joseph Smith III § Reorganization of the church
- List of denominations in the Latter Day Saint movement § Other lineages of succession
- Reorganized Church of Jesus Christ (disambiguation)
- Remnant church (disambiguation)

House of worship

- Reorganized Church of Jesus Christ of Latter Day Saints, or Plano Stone Church

Legal cases

- Reorganized Church of Jesus Christ of Latter Day Saints v. Church of Christ, an 1890s U.S. legal case
- Reorganized Church of Jesus Christ of Latter Day Saints v. Williams, an 1880 Ohio legal case
