= Church of Jesus Christ Restored =

Church of Jesus Christ Restored may refer to:

- Church of Christ (Restored), a Missouri-based church that split from the Church of Christ (Fettingite) in the late 1930s
- Church of Jesus Christ Restored 1830, a Missouri-based church that split from the Restoration Church of Jesus Christ of Latter Day Saints in 2000
- Church of Jesus Christ Restored (Ontario), an Ontario-based church that split from the Community of Christ in the 1960s
- Restored Church of Jesus Christ, a Missouri-based church that split from the Cutlerite church in 1980
- Restoration Church of Jesus Christ, a Salt Lake City-based church that split from the LDS church in 1985
- Restoration Church of Jesus Christ of Latter Day Saints, a Missouri-based church that split from the Community of Christ in 1991
