= Reorganized Church of Jesus Christ =

Reorganized Church of Jesus Christ may refer to:

- Community of Christ, which was known as the Reorganized Church of Jesus Christ of Latter Day Saints from 1872 until 2001
- an RLDS Restoration Branch located in Raytown, Missouri, which has claimed the right to use the name Reorganized Church of Jesus Christ of Latter Day Saints since the RLDS Church changed its name in 2001
- Reorganized Church of Jesus Christ (Bickertonite), a schismatic sect that separated from The Church of Jesus Christ (Bickertonite) in 1907

== See also ==
- List of churches in the Latter Day Saint Reorganization movement
