= Oakman =

Oakman is a surname. Notable people with the surname include:

- Alan Oakman (1930–2018), English cricketer
- Arthur A. Oakman (1905–1975), English Christian religious leader
- Charles G. Oakman (1903–1973), American politician
- Harry Oakman (1906–2002), Australian horticulturalist and writer
- John Oakman (c.1748–1793), English engraver and writer
- Wheeler Oakman (1890–1949), American actor

== See also ==
- Oakman-Hertel, a defunct American automobile company
