= Remnant church =

Remnant church may refer to:

- Remnant (Seventh-day Adventist belief), the Seventh-day Adventist doctrine of the "remnant church"
- Remnant Church of Jesus Christ of Latter Day Saints
- Remnant Fellowship Church, the home church of Gwen Shamblin, author of The Weigh Down Diet and founder of the Weigh Down Workshop, based in Brentwood, Tennessee
- "Remnant" movement

== See also ==
- Remnant (disambiguation)
- Reorganized church
