= Jason W. Briggs =

Jason William Briggs
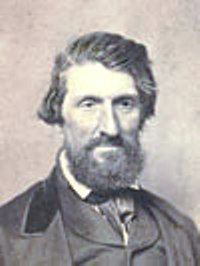

Council of Twelve Apostles
- 1853 – 1885
- End reason: Not sustained as Apostle at the 1885 conference.

Personal details
- Born: June 25, 1821; Pompey, New York, United States
- Died: January 11, 1899 (aged 77); Denver, Colorado, United States

Jason William Briggs (June 25, 1821 – January 11, 1899) was a leader in the early history of the Latter Day Saint movement and was instrumental in bringing about the 1860 "Reorganization" of the church, which resulted in the establishment of the Reorganized Church of Jesus Christ of Latter Day Saints.

== Early membership ==
Briggs was born on June 25, 1821, in Pompey, New York, to Hugh Lackey Briggs and Polly Briggs (née Damon). In 1841 at Potosi, Wisconsin, he was baptized into the Church of Jesus Christ of Latter Day Saints by William O. Clark. By 1842, Briggs had been ordained an elder of the church and he organized and became the head of a branch in Beloit, Wisconsin. By 1843, Briggs had organized a second branch in Waukesha, Wisconsin.

In 1844, the movement's founder, Joseph Smith, was killed and a succession crisis ensued. Brigham Young, president of the Quorum of the Twelve Apostles, assumed control of the church's headquarters in Nauvoo, Illinois. Briggs became convinced that Young's organization had fallen into apostasy and by 1846 he and his branches affiliated with James J. Strang, who had organized a new church headquarters in nearby Voree, Wisconsin.

Briggs was a fervent opponent of polygamy, and when Strang began to practice plural marriage openly, Briggs broke with his organization. He affiliated briefly with William Smith's organization of the church before learning that William, too, had been practicing plural marriage.

== "New Organization" ==
After these set-backs, Briggs despaired that the Latter Day Saint movement had irrevocably fallen into iniquity. He later reported that on November 18, 1851, on the prairie near Beloit, he was pondering this concern when the "Spirit of the Lord" came upon him and spoke, saying:

Verily, verily, saith the Lord, even Jesus Christ unto his servant, Jason W. Briggs, concerning the church: Behold I have not cast off my people; neither have I changed in regard to Zion. Yea, verily, my people shall be redeemed, and my law shall be kept which I revealed unto my servant Joseph Smith...

According to Briggs, the Lord further explained that "in mine own due time will I call upon the seed of Joseph Smith," (i.e., one of his sons), "and will bring one forth, and he shall be mighty and strong, and he shall preside over the high priesthood of my Church...". And finally, Briggs said the Lord assured him "that which ye received as my celestial law," (i.e., plural marriage), "is not of me, but is the doctrine of Baalam."

After reporting that he received this guidance, Briggs began to coordinate with leaders of branches in Wisconsin and Illinois, including Zenas H. Gurley Sr. who resolved with him to wait for a leader to be raised up "from the seed of Joseph." They began to establish a "New Organization" of the church and Briggs was called to preside over its first conference on June 12, 1852, in Beloit. In 1853, Briggs was called as an apostle and sustained as President of the Quorum of the Twelve and as the "Representative President of the Church."

Important leaders, including William Marks and Aaron Smith (former leader of a Strangite schismatic group), joined the movement.

On April 6, 1860, at a General Conference of the New Organization of the church in Amboy, Illinois, Joseph Smith III joined with the group and was sustained to follow in his father's role as President of the Church.

== Disagreements and disfellowship ==
By 1885, Briggs was out of harmony with Joseph Smith III. Briggs was theological liberal and was aware of "higher criticism" of the Bible being taught at the time in German universities. Like these German scholars, Briggs believed that scripture was contextually understood and that revelation was never a final process, but progressively revealed over time. Such views angered more conservative members. Briggs also attacked the idea of the pre-existence of souls, then a cherished doctrine; he also questioned whether the church should again attempt a gathered community due to the disastrous results in Joseph Smith's lifetime. While many of Joseph Smith III's actual positions mirrored Briggs's thoughts, Briggs presented them more stridently than Smith ever did. Furthermore, Briggs angered Joseph Smith III by his constant reminders that Joseph Smith had practiced polygamy, contrary to what Joseph Smith III believed. In addition, Briggs sparred with Smith over who should be allowed to print their views in the RLDS periodical, the True Latter Day Saints' Herald. At the 1885 RLDS conference, Briggs was not sustained in his position as Apostle and in 1886 he withdrew from the Reorganization. Briggs died on January 11, 1899, near Denver, Colorado.

== See also ==
- Edmund C. Briggs

== Notes ==
Community of Christ titles
Preceded by —	Council of Twelve Apostles; 1853–1885	Succeeded by James W. Gillen
