= Church of Christ (Hancock) =

Latter Day Saint movement sect

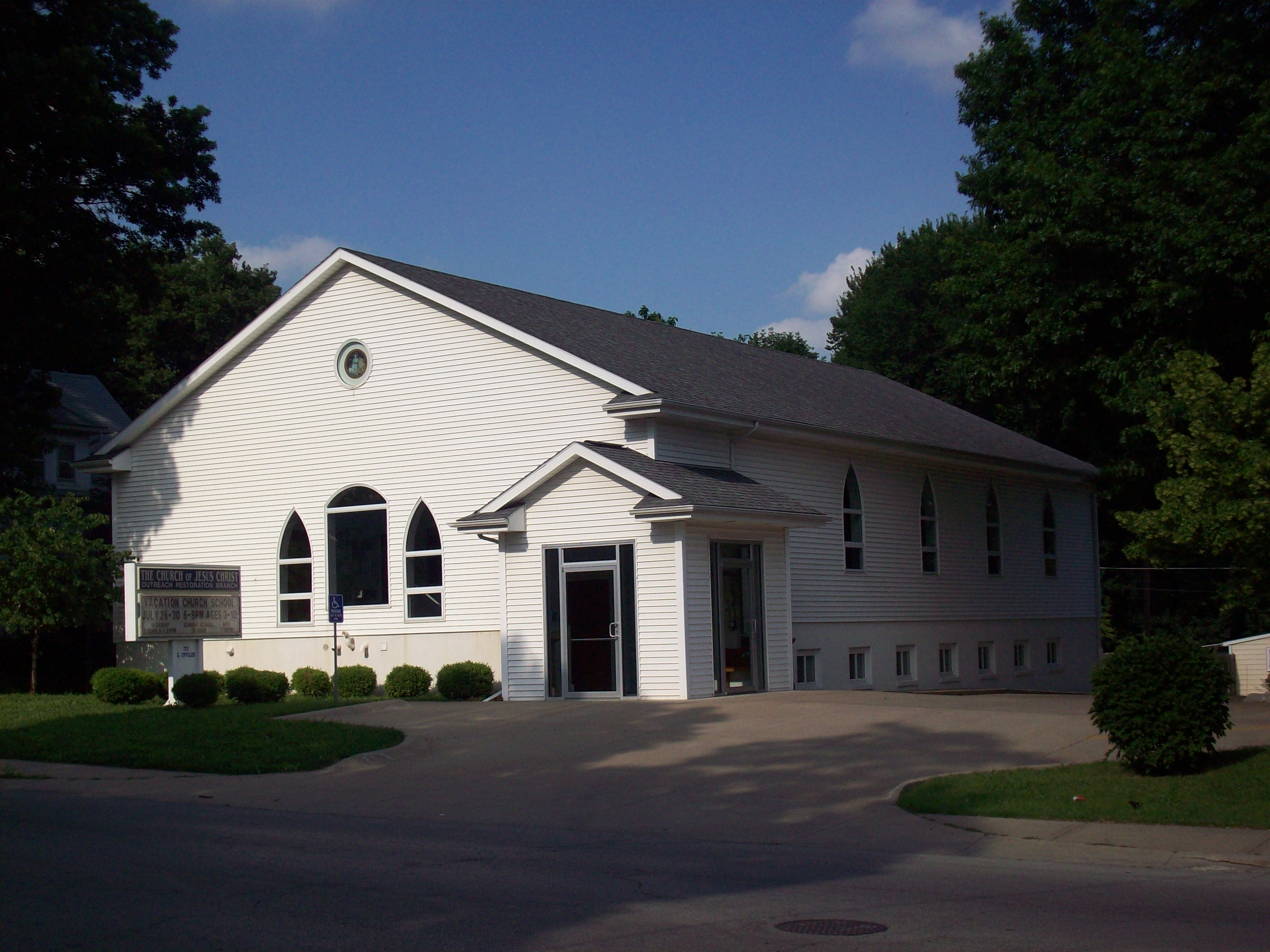
- Location of the former "basement church" belonging to the Church of Christ; now occupied by a Restoration Branch
- Classification: Latter Day Saint movement
- Orientation: Latter Day Saints
- Polity: Defunct
- Moderator: Defunct as of 1984
- Region: United States
- Founder: Pauline Hancock
- Origin: 1946; Independence, Missouri
- Separated from: Church of Christ (Temple Lot)
- Congregations: none
- Members: none; defunct

The Church of Christ, informally referred to as the Church of Christ (Hancock), the Basement Church, the Church of Christ (Lukeite) and the Church of Christ (Bible and Book of Mormon Teaching), was a sect of the Latter Day Saint movement founded in Independence, Missouri, in 1946 by Pauline Hancock. This church, which became defunct in 1984, bears the distinction of being the first Latter Day Saint sect to be founded by a woman. Among its members were Jerald and Sandra Tanner, who later became well-known opponents of the Latter Day Saint movement with their "Utah Lighthouse Ministry".

== Pauline Hancock ==
Pauline Hancock, founder of the Church of Christ

Pauline Hancock was a member of the Reorganized Church of Jesus Christ of Latter Day Saints (now called the Community of Christ), whose father had been a minister of that denomination in Salt Lake City, Utah. During the Supreme Directional Control controversy of the 1920s, she opposed President Frederick M. Smith's attempt to take "supreme directional control" over the RLDS church; she later transferred her membership to the Church of Christ (Temple Lot). In 1935, following the excommunication of her friend Apostle Samuel Wood of the Temple Lot church (who was expelled for believing in a modalistic view of the Godhead, a view Hancock supported), Hancock resigned from that organization.

== Founding a church ==
Hancock later claimed to have had a vision in which God told her to "go and teach others." She founded her own organization to propagate her teachings and visions, which included one of Jesus being crucified that led her to believe she had become "a new creature". Hancock's organization rejected the Doctrine and Covenants of their parent church, as well as the Pearl of Great Price used by the LDS Church, retaining only the King James Bible and the Book of Mormon. She adopted a modalistic view of God, insisting that the Father, Son and Holy Spirit were merely manifestation of the same, one God. The organization bought property in Independence and built a basement sanctuary that became locally known as the "basement church" because most of it was underground.

== Arrival of the Tanners and demise ==
In later years, after Jerald and Sandra Tanner joined her organization, Hancock's church established a second branch in Salt Lake City, Utah. Though Hancock remained a devoted believer in the Book of Mormon to the end of her life, her church began increasingly to question that book following her death, and ultimately made a decision to reject it in 1973. The church continued to function for a time strictly as a Protestant denomination, but later chose to dissolve itself in 1984, after which its members mostly joined with various Evangelical Protestant churches. Hancock's "basement church" was used by a Protestant church for a time, but was later sold to a local Restoration Branch, which constructed an above-ground sanctuary atop the old structure.

== See also ==
- Factional breakdown: Followers of Granville Hedrick
