= Edmund C. Briggs =

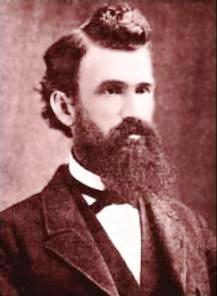
- Briggs during time as a member of the Council of Twelve Apostles

Member Council of Twelve Apostles
- October 1860 – April 18, 1902
- Called by: Joseph Smith III
- Successor: Frederick A. Smith; Francis Sheehy; Ulysses W. Greene
- End reason: Ordained as Patriarch

President of the Seventy
- April 6, 1860 – October 1860
- Called by: Joseph Smith III

Personal details
- Born: Edmund Clarke Briggs; February 20, 1835; Wheeler, New York, United States
- Died: July 4, 1913 (aged 78); Independence, Missouri, United States
- Resting place: Rose Hill Cemetery; 40.625°N 93.948°W
- Spouse(s): Emma Whitcomb
- Parents: Hugh L. Briggs; Polly Damon

Edmund Clarke Briggs (20 February 1835 – 4 July 1913) was an American leader in the Reorganized Church of Jesus Christ of Latter Day Saints (RLDS Church). Briggs was the first member of the RLDS Church to preach in Utah Territory to members of the rival Church of Jesus Christ of Latter-day Saints (LDS Church).

== RLDS Church leader ==
Briggs was born in Wheeler, Steben County, New York. In July 1852 he was converted into the Latter Day Saint movement after being taught by his brother Jason, who had earlier been baptized by Mormon missionaries. After being baptized, Edmund became an elder in the church. On 6 April 1860, when the RLDS Church was formally organized, Briggs became the president of the Seventy of the church. Later, in October 1860, Briggs was ordained an apostle and became a member of the Council of Twelve Apostles.

== Mission to Utah Territory ==
In 1863, RLDS Church president Joseph Smith III appointed Briggs to head the RLDS Church's first missionary effort in Utah Territory, where the rival LDS Church was headquartered. Briggs and Alexander McCord travelled 1000 miles by wagon and arrived in Salt Lake City on 7 August 1863. On 11 August, LDS Church president Brigham Young encouraged Briggs and McCord to leave Utah, suggesting that they may not be safe. Nevertheless, Briggs and McCord began preaching among the LDS Church members, and on 6 September they held a service in Salt Lake City where sixteen former LDS Church members were baptised into the RLDS Church. By 6 April 1864, there were 100 RLDS Church converts in Utah. By the time Briggs and McCord left Utah later that year, there were over 300 RLDS members and a district of the RLDS Church there.

== Later life ==
Briggs was a member of the RLDS Church's Council of Twelve Apostles until 18 April 1902, when he was ordained a patriarch.

== Publications ==
- Edmund C. Briggs, Early History of the Reorganization

Community of Christ titles
Preceded by —	Member Council of Twelve Apostles; October 1860 - April 18, 1902	Succeeded by Frederick A. Smith; Francis Sheehy; Ulysses W. Greene
Preceded by	President of the Seventy; April 6, 1860 - October 1860	Succeeded by
