= Remnant =

Remnant or remnants may refer to:

== Religion ==
- Remnant (Bible), a recurring theme in the Bible
- Remnant (Seventh-day Adventist belief), the remnant theme in the Seventh-day Adventist Church
- The Remnant (newspaper), a traditional Catholic newspaper

== Entertainment ==
=== Music ===
- The Remnant, former name of Becoming the Archetype, an American Christian metal band
- Remnants, a 2016 album by LeAnn Rimes
- Remnants, an album by Toronto electronic musician Roam
- "Remnant", a song by The Browning from the 2011 album Burn This World (tour edition)
- "Remnant", a song by Erra from their 2021 self-titled album
- "The Remnant", a song by Becoming the Archetype from the 2022 album Children of the Great Extinction
- "Remnants", a song by Be'lakor from the 2012 album Of Breath and Bone
- "Remnants", a song by Disturbed from the 2010 album Asylum
- "Remnants", a song by Madder Mortem from the 1999 album Mercury
- "Remnants", a song by Trenches from the 2022 album Reckoner

=== Other entertainment ===
- Remnant (comics), a character from the Squadron Supreme comic books
- The Remnant (novel), 10th book in the Left Behind series
- Remnants (Alias episode), 2003 episode of Alias
- Remnants (film), 2014 American apocalyptic thriller directed by Peter Engert
- Remnants (novel series), a series of science fiction books written by K. A. Applegate
- Remnants (Stargate Atlantis), 2008 episode of Stargate Atlantis
- Remnants, a fictional variety of corrupted souls from the Skulduggery Pleasant book series
- Remnant: From the Ashes an action role-playing third person shooter developed by Gunfire Games
- Remnants, a cancelled video game by Maxis South

== People ==
- Baron Remnant, a title in the Peerage of the United Kingdom
- Ernest Remnant, an English first-class cricketer
- George Remnant, an English first-class cricketer
- James Remnant, 1st Baron Remnant, British Conservative politician
- Peter Remnant, British Conservative politician
- Robert Remnant, 2nd Baron Remnant, English first-class and minor counties cricketer
- Scott James Remnant, an American software engineer

== Other ==
- Nova remnant, material left behind by explosive ejections of supernovae
- Supernova remnant, the structure resulting from the explosion of a star in a supernova
- Black hole remnant, a hypothetical non-radiating end point of black hole evolution
- Remnant (tropical cyclone), the storm system resulting from when a tropical cyclone or hurricane dissipates
- Remnant cholesterol, all plasma cholesterol that is not LDL cholesterol or HDL cholesterol
- Remnant Media, a British company which published a variety of pornographic magazines
- Remnants F.C., a 19th-century amateur football club in England

== See also ==
- Remnant church (disambiguation)
- Remnants of War, 1986 album by Helstar
- The Remnant Trust, an educational foundation located at Texas Tech University, Lubbock, Texas
