= Dan Gayman =

Christian Identity minister

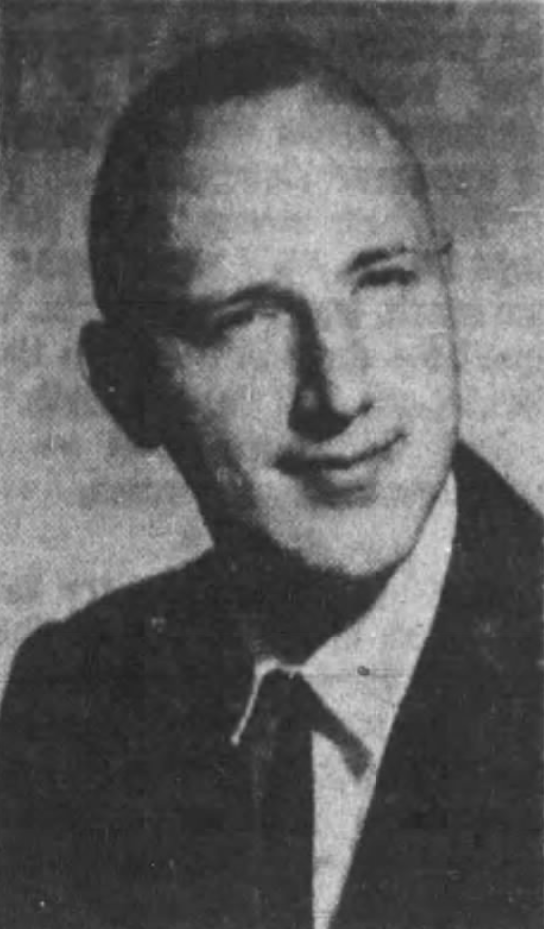
Gayman in 1964

Dan Gayman is a Christian Identity minister and the founder of Church of Israel. In 1987, Gayman began distancing the church from the more militant Christian Identity groups, and by the 1990s, had disassociated from Identity altogether.

== Background ==
Dan Gayman was born in Denver, Colorado in 1937. His family was associated with the Church of Christ (Temple Lot). He graduated with a degree in history from Southwest Missouri State in 1964. Following graduation, he received his primary training in Christian Identity theology from Kenneth Goff at Goff's Soldiers of the Cross Training Institute in Denver.

In Schell City, Missouri, Gayman worked in public education, becoming principal of Walker High School.

Gayman became the Church of Israel's pastor and in 1972, following a lawsuit from his brother Duane Gayman, he lost control of the church and its land in 1972.

In 1976, he began a full-time ministry career.

Gayman had deposed the leaders of the Church of Christ at Zion's Retreat and was then elected leader of that church. Most of the members of the church followed Gayman. However, the deposed leaders of the Zion's Retreat church sued Gayman, and the courts ordered that the church property and name be returned to the deposed leaders, and that the members of Gayman's congregation be barred from the premises. Gayman informally organized his congregation under the name Church of Our Christian Heritage. In 1977, Gayman and 10 other individuals were arrested for trespassing when they led a group back to the Church of Christ at Zion's Retreat in an attempted forcible takeover. In 1981, Gayman incorporated his church under the name Church of Israel. Little of the Latter Day Saint movement background of the church remains in its current teachings and practices.

Olympic Park bomber Eric Rudolph and his mother had attended Church of Israel in 1984 when Eric was 18. The Rudolph's were allowed to live in a mobile home owned by the church, with the understanding that they would be moving on after a short time. Gayman assumed a fatherly relationship with Rudolph and planned to groom Eric as a potential son-in-law by encouraging Eric to date his daughter.

By 1987, as a result of the activities of the Order and the Fort Smith sedition trial, Gayman began distancing himself and the church from more militant and violent strains of Christian Identity, and in January 1987, the church passed a resolution that Church of Israel would not be "a sanctuary, cover, or 'safe house' for any person or persons, organizations or groups, that teach civil disobedience, violence, militant armed might, gun-running, para-military training, hatred of blacks, reprisals against the Jews, posse comitatus, dualist, odinist, Ku Klux Klan, Neo-Nazi, national socialism, Hitler cult, stealing, welfare fraud, murder, war against the government of the United States, polygamy, driving unlicensed vehicles, hunting game without proper licenses, etc." By the 1990s, the church had disassociated from Identity, and generally avoids racialist and anti-Semitic material.

After a falling-out between Gayman and two other leaders of the church in 2003, Gayman filed a lawsuit in an attempt to revoke a severance agreement that included the deed to a house and property that had been given to a former minister, Scott Stinson. Ultimately the judge sided with Stinson.

== Beliefs ==
Gayman is among Identity Christians that take a "soft" view of the "two-seedline" or "serpent seed" doctrine. Unlike the hard-line view in which the Jewish people are said to be the literal descendants of Satan, the Jew is not genetically condemned, but rather is simply blinded by Judaism as a satanic religious creed.
