= Church of Christ (Restored) =

Latter Day Saint movement denomination

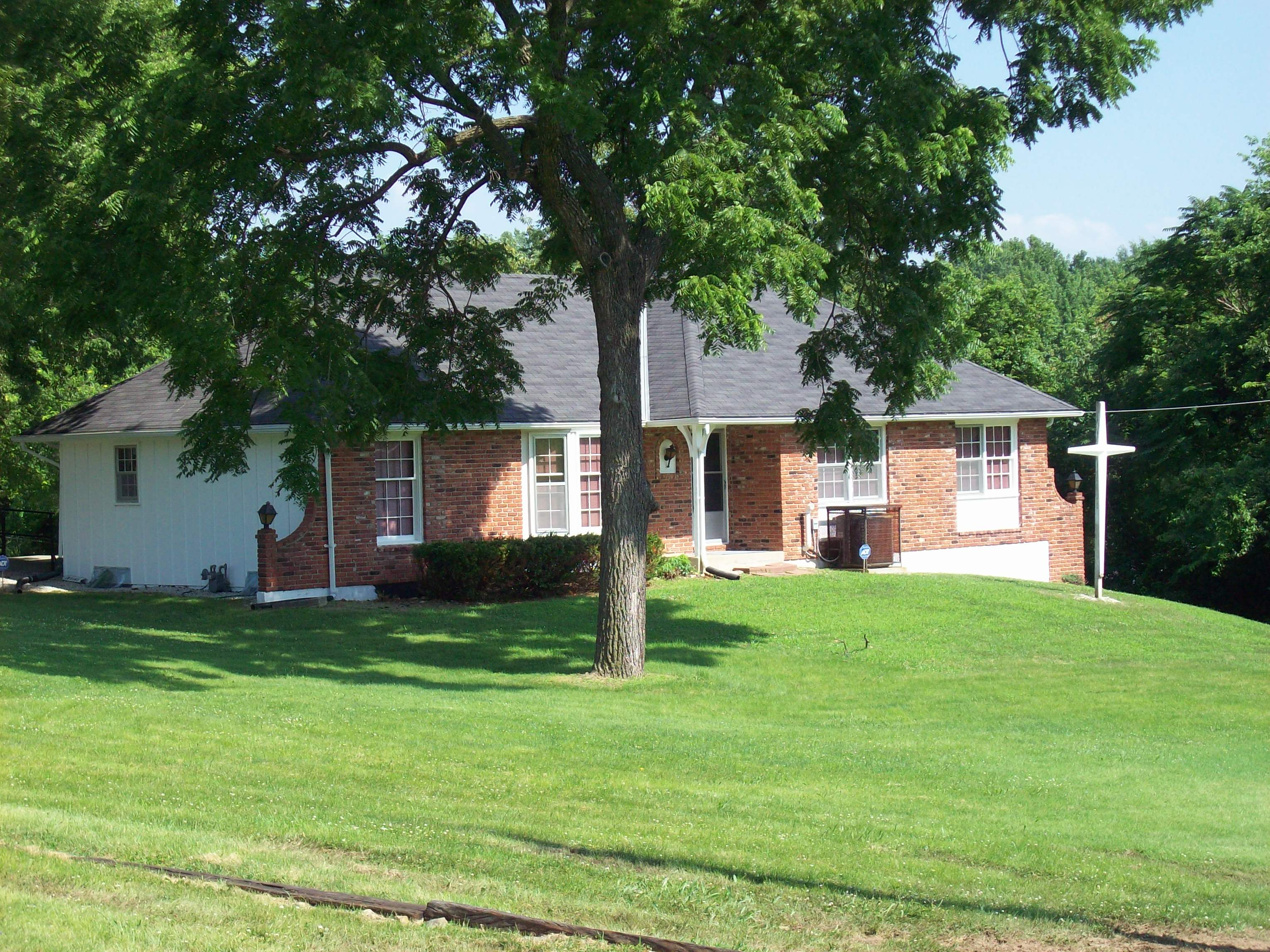
- Church of Christ (Restored) meetinghouse in Independence, Missouri
- Classification: Latter Day Saint movement
- Orientation: Latter Day Saints
- Polity: Church conference
- Moderator: None; all members of the Quorum of Twelve Apostles are equal
- Region: United States
- Founder: A. C. DeWolf
- Origin: Late 1930s
- Separated from: Church of Christ (Fettingite)

The Church of Christ (Restored) is a denomination within the Latter Day Saint movement that split from the Church of Christ (Fettingite) in the late 1930s under the leadership of Elder A. C. DeWolf. This schism was provoked by a difference in opinion regarding a series of claimed "messages" received by William Draves, an elder in that church, following the death of founder Otto Fetting. Whereas the main Fettingite church initially chose to grant cautious acceptance to these missives, several Fettingite branches in Louisiana and Mississippi did not, and split from the main organization to form the Church of Christ (Restored). Even after the main Fettingite church chose to reject Draves and his messages in 1943 (leading Draves to leave and found his own sect, the Church of Christ with the Elijah Message), the DeWolf faction refused to reconcile with the main body, considering itself to be the sole legitimate continuation of the Fettingite church, and the only true church on earth today. Its membership is currently concentrated mostly in the American South, and stands at about 450 members.

== Otto Fetting ==
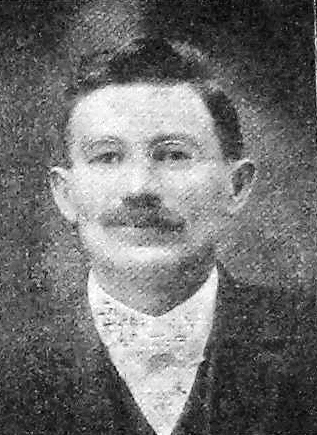
Otto Fetting in 1916

=== Entry into the Temple Lot church ===
Otto Fetting was born on 20 November 1871 in Casco, St. Clair County, Michigan. Making his home in Port Huron, Michigan, he was baptised into the Reorganized Church of Jesus Christ of Latter Day Saints on February 9, 1891, and ordained to its priesthood in 1899. In 1925, dismayed by the "Supreme Directional Control" controversy within the RLDS church, Fetting switched his allegiance to the Temple Lot organization. At the time, this did not require re-baptism or re-ordination, as each group accepted the priesthood and sacraments of the other. In the spring of 1926, he was among seven men ordained to be Apostles in the Church of Christ.

=== Visitation by John the Baptist ===
On February 4 of 1927, Otto Fetting claimed that he had been visited by John the Baptist, who delivered a message for him to give to the Temple Lot organization. This message commanded construction of the long-awaited Temple in Independence, Missouri, first foretold by Latter Day Saint founder Joseph Smith in 1831. The Temple Lot church had a long history of direction via revelation and angel visits, and thus was originally receptive to these alleged visits of the Biblical prophet, publishing Fetting's messages in their monthly periodical Zion's Advocate. They also began work on the temple with a groundbreaking ceremony held on 6 April 1929. According to Fetting, the Hedrickites were given seven years to complete the structure.

Fetting's "visitor" revealed various architectural details for the building, and specifically directed surveyors to move their markers ten feet to the east of where they had originally been placed. The angel also revealed the location of two of Joseph Smith's original marker stones, which Smith had buried 98 years before to indicate the location for his planned temple. He also indicated that the "Articles of Faith and Practice" of the Temple Lot church were correct, and should not be changed from their original form. On other occasions, the messenger indicated particular men to be ordained within the organization, including to its Quorum of Twelve Apostles.

=== The twelfth message ===
Although the Temple Lot organization had enthusiastically accepted the first eleven of Fetting's messages, this would not hold true for the twelfth. In verse four of this missive, John the Baptist states that all persons coming into the Church of Christ must be rebaptized, as "the Lord has rejected all creeds and factions of men". While this reflects the practice of the majority of Latter Day Saint denominations (including the Temple Lot church itself, today), it did not reflect the policy of the Temple Lot church at the time, which accepted members during this period from the Reorganized church, certain other Latter Day Saint organizations, and Joseph Smith's pre-1844 church on their original baptisms. This message equally declared Fetting to have been given the same "keys to the priesthood" that were given to Joseph Smith and Oliver Cowdery on May 15, 1829.

Controversy over the meaning and application of Fetting's twelfth message became so great that Fetting himself was "silenced" in October 1929 by the Temple Lot organization. Choosing to withdraw rather than continue under such a restriction, Fetting led approximately half of the Church of Christ members (including some of its apostles) to found an organization of his own, which became known as the Church of Christ (Fettingite). Since the main Temple Lot organization retained possession of the Temple Lot and its meetinghouse, Fetting's organization met in members' homes for a considerable period prior to building their own worship facilities.

Fetting would be visited a total of 30 times by his "messenger" prior to his death on 30 January 1933.

== Formation of the Church of Christ (Restored) ==
Four years after Fetting's death, a young Fettingite Elder named William A. Draves from Nucla, Colorado claimed that the same messenger who had appeared to Fetting had begun to appear to him, as well. Initially, the main Fettingite branch in Independence, Missouri gave cautious acceptance to these new missives. However, branches of the Fettingite church in Louisiana and Mississippi did not, and chose to organize a separate church under the leadership of A. C. DeWolf sometime around 1937, which became the Church of Jesus Christ (Restored). This organization remains separated from the main Fettingite group even after the latter decided to reject Draves and his messages in 1943. Draves would go on to form his own church, the Church of Christ with the Elijah Message.

When the Saturday Sabbath was introduced in the Church of Christ (Fettingite) in 1956, the Church of Christ (Restored) refused to sanction this move, and claims that the Church of Christ (Fettingite) is in error for introducing it.

Other than disagreeing as to the proper day for worship, the "Bronsonite" and "DeWolf" organizations remain virtually identical in doctrine and practice. Both of them accept Fetting's ministry and messages, but not Draves'. Each rejects the other, and considers itself the sole true continuation of Otto Fetting's church.

The Church of Christ (Restored) has approximately 450 members, while the "Bronsonite" faction is said to have about 2000.

== Doctrine and practices ==
Other than their rejection of the Saturday Sabbath, the beliefs and practices of the Church of Christ (Restored) are virtually identical to those of their parent church, the Church of Christ (Fettingite). In common with the Fettingite church, they reject the office of President of the Church, being led instead by their Quorum of Twelve Apostles, with all members of that body considered equal. Also, like their Fettingite cousins, the Church of Christ (Restored) rejects the Doctrine and Covenants and the Pearl of Great Price, as well as Joseph Smith's Inspired Version of the Bible, preferring to accept only the King James Bible and the Book of Mormon as doctrinal standards. Baptism for the Dead, eternal marriage, polygamy and the eternal progression doctrine are all rejected. Members of this group still believe that a temple will be reared on the Temple Lot, but it will not be like any of the LDS or Community of Christ temples currently in use.

In verse 6 of his twelfth "message", Otto Fetting quoted John the Baptist as allegedly saying that Joseph Smith had indeed been a true prophet, but that he "sinned before God" due to "pride, and the love and praise of men". "Much of his work has been destroyed", wrote Fetting, "but he will be saved as by fire, and will be numbered with the prophets of old". Accordingly, Fettingites respect Joseph Smith as a prophet, but do not necessarily accept all of his teaching. In verse 1 of his first "message", Fetting's heavenly envoy commanded that the "Articles of Faith and Practice" of the Temple Lot organization (of which Fetting was then still an apostle) were to remain unchanged, "because the Lord inspired the men that wrote them".

== Other bodies with this same name ==
Another Latter Day Saint organization in Vancouver, Washington, organized in 1976 under the name "Church of Christ (Restored)". This body was formed by members of the Reorganized Church who separated from that organization due to various doctrinal "innovations" that took place in the RLDS church during the 1960s and 70s. This church falls within the "Restoration Branches" movement and has nothing to do with the Fettingite movement in general, or the DeWolf organization in particular.

A Latter Day Saint body known as the Church of Jesus Christ Restored was formed in 1979 in Independence, Missouri, again by dissident former members of the RLDS church. This body was led by Stanley King, until it almost collapsed after his death in 1987, but his son Fred King moved some followers to Owen Sound, Ontario, Canada where it still exists. Like the Vancouver denomination, King's sect never had anything to do with either the Fettingite movement in general, or DeWolf's organization.

== See also ==
- Factional breakdown: Followers of Granville Hedrick
