= Amboy Conference =

1860 re-organization of a Latter Day Saint denomination

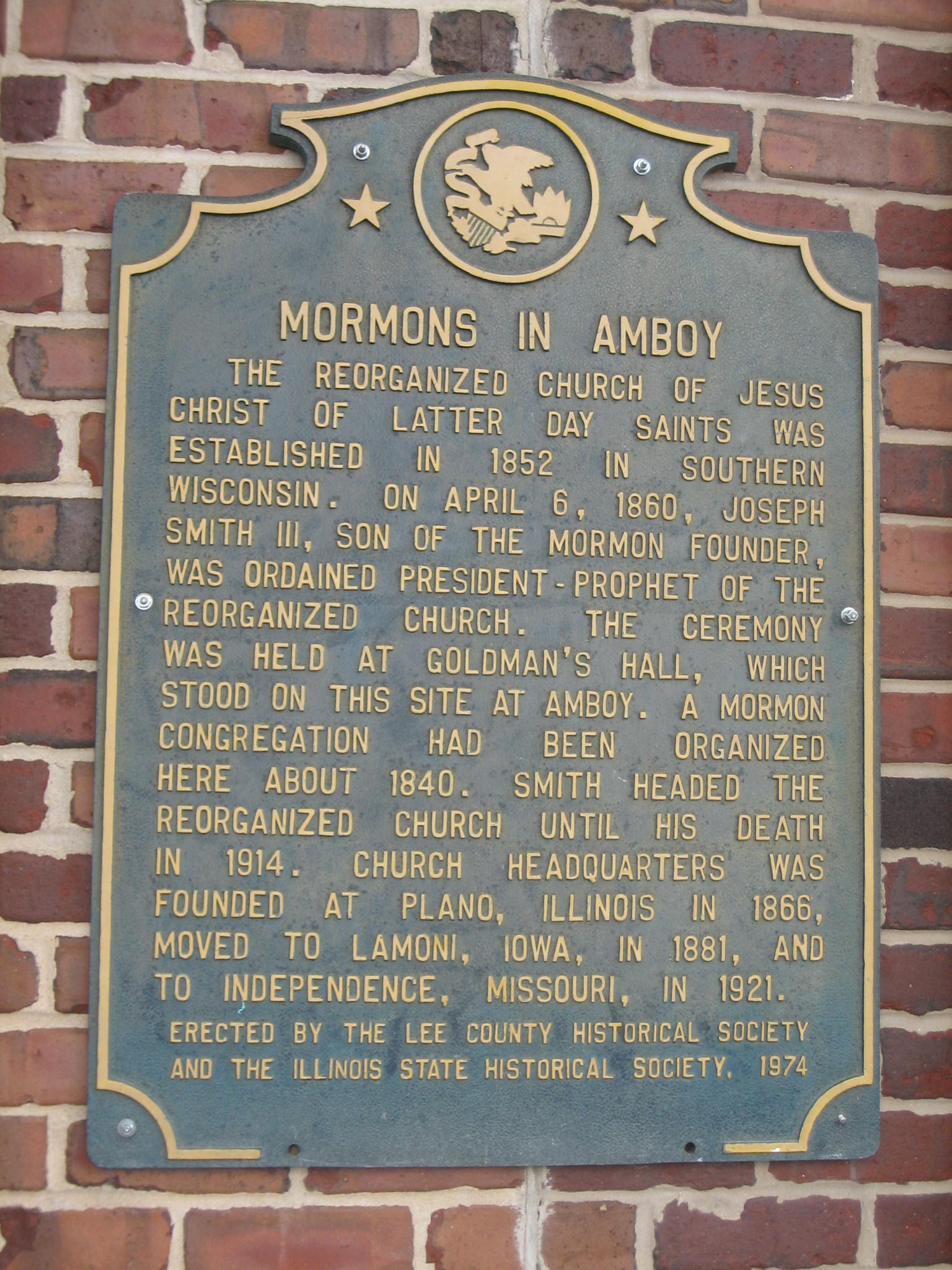

The Amboy Conference was the setting of the official "re-organization" of the Church of Jesus Christ of Latter Day Saints into the Latter Day Saint denomination known since 2001 as the Community of Christ. Held on April 6, 1860, this conference recognized movement founder, Joseph Smith's eldest son, Joseph Smith III as his rightful successor and sustained the young Joseph as President of the Church.

Elder Zenas H. Gurley Sr. presided over the conference which was held in Amboy, Illinois, and Samuel Powers and Edmund C. Briggs were reported to preach powerful sermons and bear strong testimonies of the restored gospel. Joseph Smith III addressed the conference and told the assembled Latter Day Saints that he had accepted the calling "in obedience to a power not my own, and I shall be dictated by the power that sent me." Smith also denounced the practice of plural marriage, stating that it was in opposition to the doctrine contained in the Book of Mormon. He affirmed his allegiance to the constitution and laws of the United States and he said that the church must act in accordance with those laws that there be no antagonism between church and state.

Both Smith and his mother Emma Hale Smith Bidamon were accepted into the church without rebaptism, as their original baptisms were considered to remain valid. After the conference, Smith and his mother returned to their homes in Nauvoo, Illinois, from where he began to preside over the affairs of the newly reorganized church. In 1872, the church was renamed the Reorganized Church of Jesus Christ of Latter Day Saints, which was a reference to the reorganization which occurred at the Amboy Conference.
