= Church of Christ at Halley's Bluff =

Christian denomination

Church of Christ at Halley's Bluff (formerly known as the Church of Christ at Zion's Retreat) is a small denomination within the Latter Day Saint movement. It was formed in 1932 by former members of the Church of Christ (Temple Lot), and in 1972 it lost most of its members to the leadership of Dan Gayman, who left the church and established the Church of Israel.

The Church of Christ at Halley's Bluff split from the Temple Lot church over disagreements about the validity of revelations received by Otto Fetting. In 1929, most of Fetting's followers had left the Temple Lot church and established the Church of Christ (Fettingite), which later split into factions including The Church of Christ (Restored) and the Church of Christ with the Elijah Message. However, one congregation in Denver, Colorado that accepted Fetting's revelations did not immediately break with the Temple Lot church. This congregation was led by Thomas B. Nerren (b. May 16, 1878 - d. April 1, 1967 Denver, Colorado) and Elmer E. ("E.E.") Long (b. January 4, 1872 Westerville, Ohio, d. September 27, 1952 Lee's Summit, Missouri). By 1932, Nerren was receiving his own revelations and the church had abandoned the Church of Christ (Temple Lot). Initially, the congregation called itself the Church of Christ.

In 1941, Nerren received a revelation that the church—which had since been joined by five other former Temple Lot congregations in the United States—should relocate to northeast Vernon County, Missouri. They built their church building on a hill called Halley's Bluff; the adherents called their 441-acre (1.78 km^{2}) tract Zion's Retreat and incorporated their church as the Church of Christ at Zion's Retreat.

In the 1960s, Dan Gayman became the editor of the church's periodical. In the magazine, Gayman began to advocate racist and anti-black sentiments that were more prevalent following the death of Joseph Smith. These attitudes were not supported by the leaders of the church, though they gained popularity among its members. At a 1972 meeting of the church, Gayman deposed the leaders of the church and had himself elected leader of the church. Although most of the church members followed Gayman, the deposed leaders sued Gayman and the courts ordered that the church's property and name be returned to the deposed leaders, Gerald Hall and Duane Gayman. Hall and Duane Gayman reincorporated their church under the name "Church of Christ at Halley's Bluff", and in 1981 Dan Gayman incorporated his church as the Church of Israel.

The Church of Christ at Halley's Bluff now is composed of fewer than 100 members. The church is headquartered in Schell City, Missouri.

== See also ==
- Factional breakdown: Followers of Granville Hedrick
