= Church of Israel =

Christian Identity church founded by Dan Gayman

- Arms of the Church of Israel
- Classification: Christian Identity
- Headquarters: 38.0316°N 94.2117°W
- Founder: Dan Gayman
- Origin: 1972; Schell City, Missouri
- Separated from: Church of Christ at Zion's Retreat
- Other name: Church of Our Christian Heritage
- Official website: http://www.churchofisrael.org/

The Church of Israel (formerly the Church of Our Christian Heritage) is an Anglo-Israelite organization that emerged from the Church of Christ (Temple Lot), itself a sect of the Restorationist Latter Day Saint movement. The church was first organized in 1972 by Dan Gayman.

The church has been noted for espousing white supremacist beliefs and teaching that align with the Christian Identity movement. In 1987, Gayman began distancing the church from the more militant Christian Identity groups, and by the 1990s, had disassociated altogether.

== History ==
The Church of Israel was first organized in 1972. Dan Gayman had deposed the leaders of the Church of Christ at Zion's Retreat and was then elected leader of that church. Most of the members of the church followed Gayman. However, the deposed leaders of the Zion's Retreat church sued Gayman, and the courts ordered that the church property and name be returned to the deposed leaders, and that the members of Gayman's congregation be barred from the premises. Gayman informally organized his congregation under the name "the Church of Our Christian Heritage". In 1977, Gayman and 10 other individuals were arrested for trespassing when they led a group back to the Church of Christ at Zion's Retreat in an attempted forcible takeover. In 1981, Gayman incorporated his church under the name Church of Israel. Little of the Latter Day Saint movement background of the church remains in its current teachings and practices.

By 1987, as a result of the activities of the Order and the Fort Smith sedition trial, Gayman began distancing himself and the church from more militant and violent strains of Christian Identity, and in January 1987, the church passed a resolution that the Church would not be "a sanctuary, cover, or 'safe house' for any person or persons, organizations or groups, that teach civil disobedience, violence, militant armed might, gun-running, para-military training, hatred of blacks, reprisals against the Jews, posse comitatus, dualist, odinist, Ku Klux Klan, Neo-Nazi, national socialism, Hitler cult, stealing, welfare fraud, murder, war against the government of the United States, polygamy, driving unlicensed vehicles, hunting game without proper licenses, etc." By the 1990s, the church had disassociated from Identity, and generally avoids racialist and antisemitic material.

An investigative newspaper report about the Church of Israel was published in the Joplin Globe in January 2001. The report was mostly negative and suggested that the church had ties to the Christian Identity movement. The Anti-Defamation League (ADL) includes the Church of Israel in its list of "extremist groups." The ADL report states that members of the church are said to have been involved at times with controversial figures such as Bo Gritz, Eric Rudolph, and Thomas Robb, a national leader of the Ku Klux Klan. Donna Henderson, a Republican member of the North Dakota House of Representatives who was first elected in 2022, has close ties to the church as well.

=== 2003 Rudolph connection ===
In 2003, it was revealed that the Olympic Park bomber and one of the FBI's Ten Most Wanted Fugitives, Eric Rudolph, and his mother had attended the Church of Israel in 1984 for three or four months, when Eric was 18. Gayman assumed a fatherly relationship with Rudolph and planned to groom Eric as a potential son-in-law by encouraging Eric to date his daughter.

=== 2003 lawsuit ===
After a falling-out between Gayman and two other leaders of the church in 2003, Gayman filed a lawsuit in an attempt to revoke a severance agreement that included the deed to a house and property that had been given to a former minister, Scott Stinson. Ultimately the judge sided with Stinson.

=== Publications ===
The church issues a quarterly newsletter called The Watchman.

== Beliefs ==
The church's doctrine states that it believes in one true and ever-living, self-existing, uncreated God, whose name is Jehovah, and in the Trinity; however, the church rejects the term in favor of Godhead. It also believes the Gifts of the Spirit continue to be given today. Where it diverges from mainstream Christianity is in its advocacy of kinism and dominionism.

=== Serpent seed doctrine ===
Gayman is recognized for propagating the "two-seedline" or "serpent seed" doctrine. The doctrine holds that white people are descendants of Adam and are hence the chosen people of God. The Jewish people are said to be descendants of Cain and thus of Satan. This antisemitic belief was developed by Wesley A. Swift, Conrad Gaard, Dan Gayman, and William Potter Gale, among others.

=== Political views ===
The Church of Israel holds a "deep distrust for the government". At one time, the church did not believe in using Social Security numbers, driver's licenses, or marriage licenses. Most children in the church who were home birthed do not have Social Security numbers.

=== Medicine ===
The Church of Israel believes that the medical profession is "Jewish"—an antisemitic trope—and discourages the use of physicians and immunizations.

=== Sabbath and holidays ===
Since 1987, the Church of Israel has regarded the seventh day of the week as the Sabbath. It also rejects traditional Christian holidays such as Christmas and Easter as pagan innovations. It celebrates the Jewish holidays in their stead despite its anti-Jewish belief system.
