= Arthur A. Oakman =

Arthur Alma Oakman

Personal life
- Born: 30 March 1905 Ponders End, Middlesex, England
- Died: 26 December 1975 (aged 70)
- Spouse: Elva T. Sturges (m. 1937)
- Notable work: '
- Education: Graceland College
- Known for: Apostle in the RLDS Church, leader of European missions, influential theologian

Religious life
- Religion: Community of Christ (formerly RLDS Church)
- Church: Community of Christ

Senior posting
- Period in office: 1938–1964 (Apostle); 1964 onwards (Evangelist)

Arthur Alma Oakman (30 March 1905 – 26 December 1975) was an apostle and a member of the Council of Twelve Apostles of the Reorganized Church of Jesus Christ of Latter Day Saints (RLDS, now Community of Christ) from 1938 to 1964. Arthur Alma Oakman (30 March 1905 – 26 December 1975) was an apostle and a member of the Council of Twelve Apostles of the Reorganized Church of Jesus Christ of Latter Day Saints (RLDS, now Community of Christ) from 1938 to 1964.

== Biography ==
Oakman was born in Ponders End, Middlesex, England. He was born and raised in the RLDS Church, and in 1915 was baptized at the age of ten. In 1928, he was ordained to the office of Priest and two years later was ordained to the office of Elder. He received his education from Graceland College and graduated in 1930. In 1934, he was then ordained to a Seventy and in 1936, he was ordained a High Priest. He was married to Elva T. Sturges on 1 January 1937.

In 1938, Oakman was ordained an Apostle and was in the Council of Twelve, as mentioned in Doctrine and Covenants section 137:2. He was given the responsibility of leading the European missions, and presided over their 1939 conference in Germany. On his way to the conference he was arrested by the Gestapo and questioned about RLDS doctrine on the Second Coming, but he and his companions were released. In 1964, he was released from the Council of the Twelve and was ordained an Evangelist in the RLDS Church.

Historian Robert Ben Madison has described Oakman as "a towering figure in RLDS history". Historian Stuart A. C. Parker has argued that Oakman was an important figure in RLDS theology, especially theology influenced by the New Left and grounded in praxis, as Oakman provided a "comprehensive exposition of the theology and related theories of causation that underpinned it".

== Doctrine and Covenants ==
Oakman is mentioned twice in the RLDS edition of the Doctrine and Covenants:

1. Sec 137:2 "To fill the vacancies in the Quorum of Twelve, let the following named brethren be ordained and set apart as apostles: C. George Mesley, Arthur A. Oakman, and Charles R. Hield."
1. Sec 147:3 "Arthur A. Oakman has magnified the gift of communicating the beauties of the gospel through the spoken word as he has served in the councils of my church. In order that he may have more freedom to advance my work through his special talents in ministry he is relieved of his duties as a member of the leading missionary quorum and should be give an assignment within the patriarchal order, as an evangelist, to which order he is called, to carry on revival witnessing in key centers of church establishment and expansion."

== Books ==
Oakman wrote several religious works:

1. God's Spiritual Universe (1961)
2. He Who Is (1963)
3. Belief in Christ (1964)
4. Resurrection and Eternal Life (1959)
5. O Worship the King (with F. Weddle) (1952)
