= Church of Jesus Christ (Zion's Branch) =

Branch of the Latter-day Saint Movement

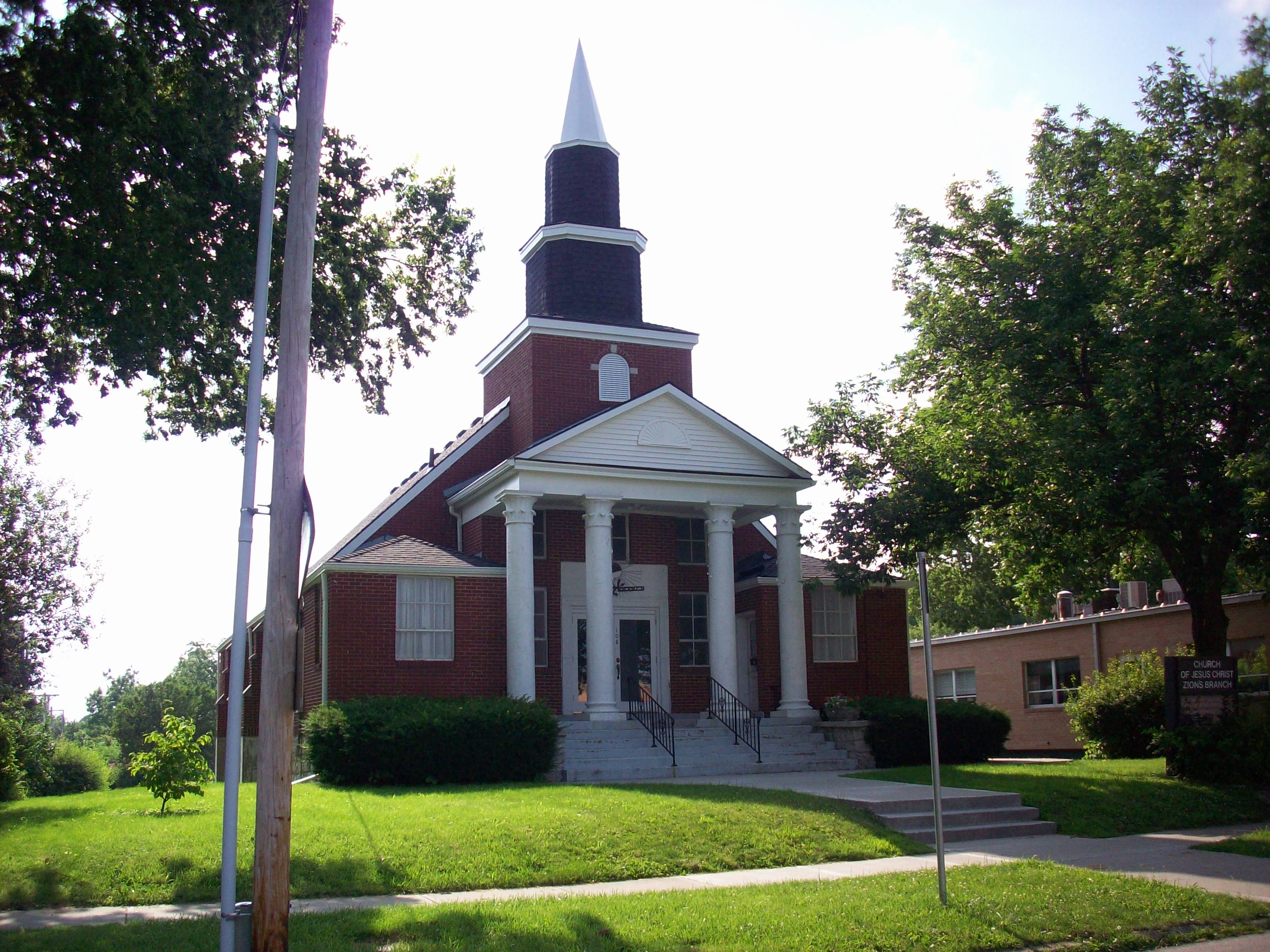
- Former Zion's Branch meetinghouse in Independence, Missouri
- Classification: Latter Day Saint movement
- Orientation: Latter Day Saints
- Polity: Church conference
- Region: United States
- Founder: A.J.Cato, Robert Hall, Dennis Cato, Noel Goldsmith, and Lloyd Cunningham
- Origin: April 6, 1985; Independence, Missouri
- Separated from: Reorganized Church of Jesus Christ of Latter Day Saints (now Community of Christ)
- Congregations: 1
- Members: 40

The Church of Jesus Christ (Zion's Branch) is a denomination of the Latter Day Saint movement headquartered in Independence, Missouri. It was formed on April 6, 1985 by individuals who had separated from the Reorganized Church of Jesus Christ of Latter Day Saints, now the Community of Christ, due to certain doctrinal changes which took place in this organization during the 1970s and 80s, culminating in the adoption of Section 156 of the RLDS Doctrine and Covenants, which allowed women to be ordained to the priesthood. Unable to accept this or other doctrinal changes, a group of elders and members led by A.J. Cato, Robert Hall, Dennis Cato, Noel Goldsmith, Roger E Billings and Lloyd Cunningham, among others, formed Zion's Branch as a separate church. This organization no longer maintains a website, but despite this, many still claim to be proud members of the group. The meetinghouse was sold in April 2019 and is currently being repurposed.

== Beliefs ==
Zion's Branch has a "Statement of Belief" on its official website. It affirms that God the Father, Jesus Christ and the Holy Ghost are "separate, distinct entities", and that God is eternally unchangeable. The "fullness of the gospel" is contained within the Bible and Book of Mormon. Other scripture is also accepted from the Book of Commandments and portions of the RLDS Doctrine and Covenants but specific revelations therein must be deemed by the church to be "in harmony with the fullness of the gospel as contained in the Bible and Book of Mormon" (which is not always the case). Zion's Branch utilizes the Inspired Version of the Bible, and the RLDS edition of the Book of Mormon.

Zion's Branch teaches baptism by immersion, laying of hands for receipt of the Holy Ghost ("Confirmation"), administration of the Sacrament (the church practices closed communion), laying on of hands for healing of the sick, and ordination (of males only) by laying on of hands to various offices in the Aaronic and Melchizedek priesthoods.

Zion's Branch believes that Joseph Smith was a prophet of God, but subject to error and deception like any man, and thus they do not accept all that he allegedly said or taught. Baptism for the Dead, a temple Endowment, Eternal Marriage, polygamy, and certain priesthood offices that are common within the Latter Day Saint movement, such as church president, are not accepted. For a short time, Zion's Branch endeavored to practice the United Order, but has since ceased doing so.

At present, there are no apostles within the Zion's Branch organization, though the organization has not formally disclaimed belief in such.

== Revelations ==
In September 2007, elder Ron Perkins of the Zion's Branch church offered a revelation entitled "An Admonition to all Saints of the Restoration". Although Perkins does not claim to be a prophet, he did assert that he had received this message "by the power of [the] Holy Spirit". In this short "admonition", Latter Day Saints in general are chided for following "sinful and ignorant men who have followed their own ways instead of God's ways", and "dishonorable priesthood" holders. The revelation admonishes its readers that God will no longer tolerate their "willful ignorance" of his truth. This revelation has been reproduced on the church's website.
