= Church of Jesus Christ Restored 1830 =

Latter Day Saint movement sect

Coordinates: 39.138853°N 94.191677°W

The Church of Jesus Christ Restored 1830 is a small sect in the Latter Day Saint movement that is headquartered in Buckner, Missouri. The church broke away from the Restoration Church of Jesus Christ of Latter Day Saints in the year 2000 under the leadership of five members of the First Quorum of Restoration Seventies.

The church believes that there are three presidential quorums the decisions of which have equal authority when quorum decisions are unanimous.

The Church of Jesus Christ Restored 1830 claims to be the rightful successor to the Church of Christ established by Joseph Smith on April 6, 1830. It teaches that anyone can receive revelations for that area of stewardship that they are responsible for. It believes that the President of the High Priesthood is chosen by the body of the church and is given the gifts and talents that belong to that office and calling. It accepts those revelations [approved by conference or assembly action] that were given of God to Joseph Smith, who is considered a prophet of God and the first President of the High Priesthood.

The church registered its name with the state of Missouri on October 6, 2000. It has members in numerous states of the United States and in Australia, Nigeria, Ghana, and Côte d'Ivoire.

== Notes ==
The Church of Jesus Christ Restored 1830 is a church of Latter Day Saints that is presently headquartered in Buckner, Missouri. It consists mainly of priesthood and members who left the Reorganized Church of Jesus Christ of Latter Day Saints and the Restoration church of Jesus Christ of Latter Day Saints. The church separated under the leadership of the Quorum of Seventy in the year 2000 when it found these groups had departed from the ratified code of laws that was given of God for the governance of His church at Kirtland, Ohio in 1835. (See Doctrine and Covenants 1835 edition.)

The church has two grand priesthoods that were restored to earth through Joseph Smith Jr., and Oliver Cowdery in 1829. These two priesthoods are in authority today inasmuch as those holding them have not broken their covenants of baptism and ordination. Those baptized and confirmed by authorized priesthood are considered members of the Church of Jesus Christ Restored 1830. The church believes in all the quorums that were established to achieve common consent in the church by the General Assembly ratified laws at Kirtland, Ohio in 1835. The two priesthoods were restored in 1829 prior to the church being organized on the 6th of April 1830.

The Church of Jesus Christ Restored 1830 claims to be a continuation of the Church of Jesus Christ established by Joseph Smith on April 6, 1830. It teaches that members can seek and receive revelations to assist them in those areas of stewardship of which they are responsible. Church law declares that the President of the High Priesthood (who is president of the church) is chosen by the body and receives of God those gifts and talents that are required and belong to that office and calling. It accepts the 1835 General Assembly action when all the quorums were in agreement to be governed as a church by the laws of common consent ratified in the 1835 Doctrine and Covenants.

An example of this approved church law: Doctrine and Covenants Section 111. “Inasmuch as this Church of Christ has been reproached with the crime of fornication, and polygamy: we declare that we believe that one man should have one wife; and one woman but one husband, except in case of death, when either is at liberty to marry again.” When the church began disregarding the law, apostasy was close behind. Note: Nothing was added to the law (Doctrine and Covenants) from 1835 to 1844 while Joseph Smith Jr., was living. Joseph was murdered on the 27th of June 1844. Testimony of Hyrum Smith, brother to Joseph Smith Jr. that Polygamy was not sanctioned in 1844. ““April 8, 1844—A large collection of Elders assembled at the stand. Addressed by Patriarch Hyrum Smith on Spiritual wife system. The first one we heard reporting such stories we will report him in the Times and Seasons to come and give up his license. He was decided against it in every form and spoke at length. President Rigdon Concurred in his remarks following Hyrum.” (Diaries and journals of Joseph Smith page 469)

The First Quorum of Restoration Seventy have been given a direction by God to set the General Church into order. The church registered its name with the state of Missouri on October 6, 2000. It has members in numerous states of the United States and in Australia, Nigeria, Ghana, and Côte d'Ivoire. Nolan William Glauner President of Seventy and Acting Member of Church Presidency
