= Remnant Church of Jesus Christ of Latter Day Saints =

Branch of the RLDS Church

Coordinates: 39°05′33″N 94°25′27″W

- Remnant Church Headquarters, formerly the William Chrisman High School, near the Mormon Temple Lot
- Classification: Latter Day Saint movement
- Orientation: Latter Day Saints
- Polity: Church Conference
- President: Terry W. Patience
- Region: United States
- Origin: April 6, 2000; Independence, Missouri
- Separated from: Restoration Branches
- Other names: Remnant Church; The Remnant Church; RCJCLDS
- Official website: theremnantchurch.com

The Remnant Church of Jesus Christ of Latter Day Saints, usually referred to as the Remnant Church, is a denomination in the Latter Day Saint movement. The prophet / president of the church is Terry W. Patience.

== History ==
In the 1970s and 1980s, the Reorganized Church of Jesus Christ of Latter Day Saints (now called Community of Christ) was criticized from within, by its membership, for various changes in policy and leadership. These issues, among other issues, included female priesthood, the ending of the doctrine of lineal succession, and the construction of the Independence Temple.

This led to several branches of the RLDS Church to form groups of independent Restoration Branches. In May 1999, several members of these branches met as the Conference of Restoration Elders, including Frederick Niels Larsen, great-great-grandson of Joseph Smith Jr. They published the "Proclamation and Invitation to the Faithful", which led to the creation of the Remnant Church of Jesus Christ of Latter Day Saints on April 6, 2000.

In April 2002, as a descendant of Joseph Smith, Larsen was chosen to become the President of the High Priesthood of the Remnant Church, and he was sustained as the prophet and president of the church until his death. Larsen died on April 26, 2019. Following his death, Terry Wayne Patience became President of the High Priesthood/Prophet/President of the church on June 29, 2019 during a special conference of the church.

== Doctrine ==
Through its history with the Reorganized Church, the Remnant Church considers itself to be a remnant of the Church of Christ organized by Joseph Smith Jr. in 1830, and thus the "one true church".

The church has its headquarters near the Temple Lot, across from the Independence Temple (headquarters of the Community of Christ), and within the former William Chrisman High School (built in 1918).

The Remnant Church maintains belief in a geophysical "Zion", a central belief of the Church during the time of Joseph Smith Jr.

Members of the Remnant Church believe that the Inspired Version of the Bible, Book of Mormon and the Doctrine and Covenants are sacred texts. The Pearl of Great Price of The Church of Jesus Christ of Latter-day Saints, as a whole, is not part of the Remnant canon of scripture. The Remnant Church's Doctrine and Covenants shares the same sections as that of Community of Christ up to Section 144 (the last revelation from the presidency of Israel A. Smith). As of 2015, there are an additional 17 sections unique to the Remnant Church, all of which were given through Frederick Larsen. A document outlining their foundational beliefs, as written by Joseph Smith Jr. is published on the Remnant Church's website as "Our Epitome of Faith".

The Presiding Bishop of the church, W. Kevin Romer, is recognized as a "literal descendent of Aaron" (cf. Kohanim) and thus holds the unique office of “Aaronic High Priest”.
