= Restoration branches =

Collection of Latter Day Saint break-away groups

Restoration Branches Movement
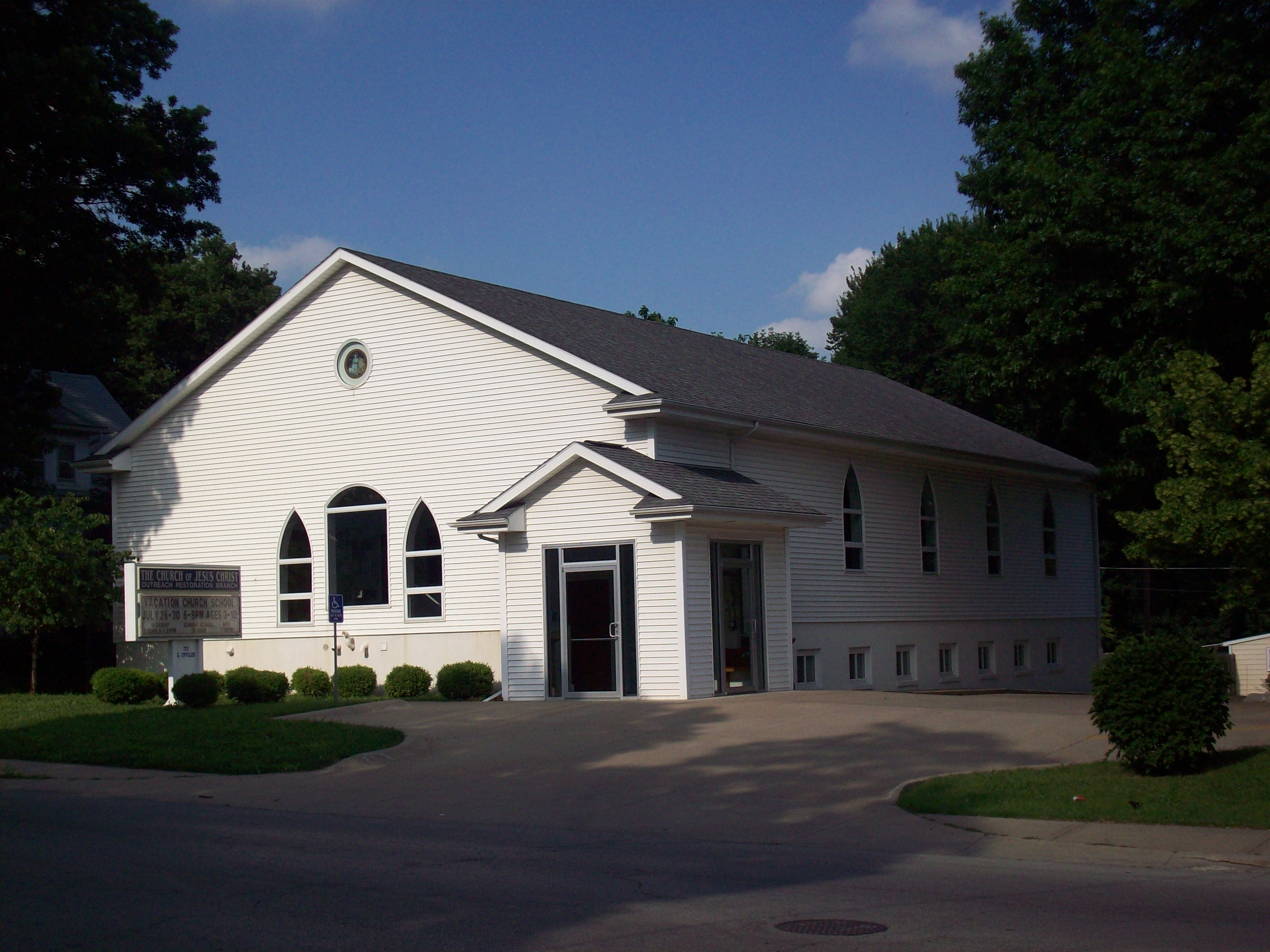
- Outreach Restoration Branch, a Restoration branch located in Independence, Missouri
- Classification: Latter Day Saint movement
- Orientation: Latter Day Saints
- Theology: Trinitarianism
- Polity: Local congregations are self-governing
- Leaders: Various Restoration leaders
- Region: United States
- Founder: Various local leaders from the RLDS Church
- Origin: 1984; Independence, Missouri
- Separated from: Reorganized Church of Jesus Christ of Latter Day Saints (1984)
- Separations: Remnant Church of Jesus Christ of Latter Day Saints (2000)
- Members: c. 10,000 as of 2011

Restoration Branches movement is a Christian/Latter Day Saint religious sect that was formed in the 1980s by members of the Reorganized Church of Jesus Christ of Latter Day Saints (RLDS, now the Community of Christ) in a reaction against the events of the RLDS 1984 world conference. The movement holds in the traditional RLDS theology of the 19th and early-to-mid 20th centuries and hold that events leading up to and surrounding the 1980s and decades since have introduced sweeping, fundamental changes into RLDS doctrine and practice that are illegitimate because they contradict the long-standing RLDS theological tradition this sect holds as true. It is not a part of the Latter Day Saints or “Mormon” religion, as RLDS and LDS roots took different paths in the 1850s, with LDS leaders settling in Utah.

The movement is centered inIndependence, Missouri, which followers believe, as Joseph Smith, Jr and Joseph Smith III taught, is the “Centerplace” of Zion.

Traditionally, the "branch" is a local congregational unit in the RLDS church. The term "Restoration" was added as a result of the schism to denote a branch's separation from the organizational hierarchy and inferring what participants see as loyalty to the original principles of the Restoration of Joseph Smith and the Reorganization of Joseph Smith III in stark contrast to the liberal theology embraced by the Community of Christ.

Organizers of the Restoration Branches movement considered the official RLDS church organization to have become corrupt or to have fallen into apostasy, so that the church is now "in an unorganized state" paralleling church affairs following the death of Joseph Smith, Jr in 1844. Their primary disagreement with the Community of Christ, as the official RLDS church organization renamed itself in 2001, was nominally over the church's decision to ordain women to the priesthood. Restoration Branches continue to assert that only men have priesthood authority; however, other religious and doctrinal issues were and are also disputed.

No universally recognized central organization exists currently within the Restoration Branches movement, so any figures concerning membership numbers are difficult to ascertain. The Joint Conference of Restoration Branches was reported as having 6,000 to 7,000 registered members as of 2010. However, all persons baptized by authoritative RLDS priesthood are regarded as "church members" by the conference regardless of formal registration, conference affiliation (or lack thereof) including non-affiliated branches, members of the Remnant Church of Jesus Christ of Latter Day Saints and even some Community of Christ members (depending on the circumstances of their baptism, given the movement's stance against women in the priesthood) therefor what fraction of the total recognized membership are registered with the conference is unknown but it is likely much higher than the registered number.

== Doctrines ==
Basic Restoration Branches movement beliefs reaffirm the original RLDS doctrines. The RLDS church holds that Joseph Smith was succeeded by Joseph Smith III and not by Brigham Young.

The "Epitome of Faith" by Joseph Smith is often cited as a statement of faith and Restoration Branches missionaries typically use the "Go Ye and Teach" slide series, a missionary program developed in the 1960s and endorsed by the Presidents of the Seventy in 1969 before being denounced as "too doctrinal" by the Council of Twelve Apostles.

The "six fundamental principles of the Restored gospel" are often cited as the foundation of traditional RLDS belief. They are found in the sixth chapter of Hebrews in the Bible. They are:

- Faith towards God.
- Repentance
- Baptism of water.
- Laying on of hands for the reception of the Holy Ghost. (analogous to confirmation)
- Resurrection of the dead.
- Eternal judgement.

The works of 20th-century RLDS ministers Arthur A. Oakman and Evan Fry are significant influences on contemporary 21st-century Restoration Branches movement thought. Fry's radio program "Hear Ye Him", representing the church's views in the 1950s, continue to be referred to as a source of theology by contemporary mainstream Restoration Branches.

== Priesthood ==
In the RLDS church, there are Prophets (Presidents of the RLDS church), Apostles, High Priests, Bishops, Patriarchs, seventy, Elders, Priests, Teachers and Deacons. Although some members of the higher priesthood offices (such as High Priests, Seventy and Patriarchs) still survive within the Restoration Branches movement, for many years, the sect was only able to ordain elders, priests, teachers, and deacons due to the scattered conditions they perceived in their Church.

There are many divisions within the Restoration Movement today: At the October 2008 United States National Conference (Joint Conference of Restoration Branches) several individuals were ordained to the office of Seventy. These are the first new ordinations to that office recognized by any Restoration Branches group in over 20 years. Others have been since called and ordained to the office of Seventy, and at the 2011 conference, several individuals were ordained to the office of High Priest. However, there is still debate within the Restoration Branches movement as to whether or not the ordinations were legitimate. This group would be known among the Restoration as JCRB supporters. Many of the Restoration Branches do not accept JCRB ordinations to date.

The Conference of Restoration Elders (CRE) represents the body of the Restoration Branches that to date only are authorized to "approve priesthood calls and ordain men limited to the offices of elder, priest, teacher, and deacon." The CRE's aim, as stated in the 1999 document "A Proclamation and Invitation to the Faithful," is to seek "divine guidance toward further reorganization."

== Major ordinances ==
Ordinances in the Restoration Branch movement are seen as sacred covenants between the individual or married couple and God. Restoration Branch members believe that only male individuals with lines of priesthood ordinations that can be traced back to the original RLDS church can perform legitimate ordinances today. These ordinances include:

=== Blessing of children ===
Performed by two elders per a commandment that all members bring their children to be blessed, child blessings are performed with the purpose of dedicating the child to God. The parents are recognizing as taking upon them the responsibility of raising the child to maturity and that they will do their best to raise the child, teaching him or her the ways of Christ and the church. This ordinance is not considered a baptism and is viewed as different from the christenings and infant baptisms performed in other denominations.

=== Administration for the sick ===
From time to time, members with physical, mental, or spiritual ailments call on the elders for administration. Two elders are usually present for this ordinance, in which "the elders of the church anoint the head of the sufferer with consecrated oil, lay their hands upon his (or her) head and offer a prayer for healing and blessing."

=== Baptism of water ===
All Restoration Branches agree that baptism by full immersion in water, symbolizing physical rebirth and remission of sins, is requisite for membership. This ordinance may be performed by an elder or priest, and generally occurs in a baptismal font, when available. However, any body of waist deep water is acceptable for use in this ordinance. Prior to baptism, the recipient is required to receive instruction in church beliefs, generally in the form of a pre-baptismal class. Baptism is viewed as a covenant between the recipient and God. Baptism of water can be performed by an Aaronic priest or the Melchizedek priesthood.

=== Baptism of fire and the Holy Ghost ===
Also referred to as confirmation, this ordinance represents the spiritual rebirth of the recipient and seals the member into a covenant with God. Baptism of fire may occur during the same service as baptism of water, in an evening service following a morning baptism of water, or weeks, months, even years in some extreme cases may lapse between baptism of water and baptism of fire. In this ordinance, two elders participate. Both elders lay their hands on the recipient's head, and one of the elders prays for the receiving of the Holy Ghost by the member, thus completing the member's entry into the church. This baptism must be performed by a member of the Melchizedek priesthood.

=== Sacrament (communion) ===
The purpose of this ordinance is to remember the Savior and the covenants made by the member at baptism. This ordinance entails adequate preparation by the members in reconciling with each other, a specific prayer of blessing is read over the bread, the participating priesthood is served first, then the priesthood serves the members in attendance. This process is repeated with non-fermented wine (new wine) that has also been made to scriptural specifications. This process is generally adhered to by all members, unless for any reason the emblems cannot be homemade, in which case the bread may be replaced with saltines and the non-fermented wine with grape juice. The Restoration Branches practice "close communion," which means that only baptized members may partake of the emblems.

=== Patriarchal blessings ===
In the Restoration Branches movement, the chief function of the patriarchal blessing is "to give authoritative, priestly blessing, invoked by a spiritual father representing God and the church...Other chief functions...are to give comfort when needed, or admonition, and especially good counsel as to a godly way of life, to rededicate and to consecrate, to bring a benediction from above, to help one find himself or herself and make an adjustment to life and its problems." Members of the Restoration Branches movement believe that the revealing of lineage may occur during a patriarchal blessing, as may the revealing of future events, but neither of these are main functions of the blessing or the spirit of prophecy that may be present at the blessing.

=== Marriage ===
Each individual marriage service is unique, but members are encouraged to have the service performed by an elder or priest of the church when possible. The whole movement rejects same-sex marriage, defining marriage as between one man and one woman.

=== Ordination ===
In the Restoration Branches movement, priesthood are called by revelation of the Holy Spirit to the presiding elder of a branch and at least one other priesthood member, or if in an isolated area, to the visiting missionaries, and to the member who is being called. In branches, the approval process varies somewhat, but it always culminates in the member being ordained in a service by the laying on of hands of two priesthood members. Requirements for the office of the ordainers varies according to what office the recipient is called to. Examples also exist in church history of individuals being ordained, as in set aside or chosen for a specific task, for purposes other than priesthood office.

== Three Standard Books ==
The Restoration Branches movement's body of scriptures consists of:

- The RLDS Inspired Version of the Bible (does not contain the Song of Solomon)
- The RLDS 1908 Authorized Edition of the Book of Mormon, not to be confused with the edition of the Book of Mormon in use by the LDS Church, or the RLDS 1966 Edition. Some Restoration Branch members also use the Restored Covenant Edition.
- The RLDS Doctrine & Covenants up to Section 144.

== Differences from the Community of Christ ==
As the Restoration Branches have no universally recognized central organization, no one organization is able to speak for all of them at this time. However, here is a sampling of some of differences in their beliefs from the Community of Christ:

- The Restoration Branches believe in an unchanging God, and so they do not believe in "disjunctive revelation" - meaning all genuine new revelations must completely agree with all genuine revelations given in the past. They see new revelations from the Community of Christ as disjunctive, and thus, false. (See law of non-contradiction)
- The Community of Christ ordains women to priesthood offices. The Restoration Branches believe that women have different, though not inferior, callings from men and that the Lord never intended women to hold priesthood offices. They do not recognize female priesthood callings in the Community of Christ or ordinances performed by women. As support for this doctrinal position, Restoration Branch members cite the lack of women's ordinations to priesthood offices in the Scriptures up until the recent changes that took place in the 1980s that were the cause of the schism combined with the statements of the Biblical authors on the role of women. The Restoration Branches specifically reject the Community of Christ's Doctrine & Covenants Section 156, which called for women's ordinations, as disjunctive and contrary to the word of God.
- The Community of Christ, following instructions given in Section 156 of their Doctrine and Covenants, built a "sacred space of worship, education, and church administration" called the Independence Temple on a portion of the original 63 acre Temple Lot site in Independence, Missouri, including a "World Plaza." The movement does not recognize the Community of Christ's claim of divine direction to build it. Though they do recognize that Joseph Smith did receive revelation(s) ordering the construction of a temple on the Temple Lot site sometime in the future, they believe the Community of Christ's efforts in this regard to be illegitimate.
- Many members of Restoration Branches believe they have been disenfranchised in church government by the Community of Christ, citing the rights of branches listed in the Articles of Incorporation of the Reorganized Church of Jesus Christ of Latter Day Saints (1872), a legal document incorporating the church under the laws of the state of Illinois. They argue that the methods employed to facilitate many changes that have taken place during and since the twentieth century have violated the branches and individual members rights to voice and vote in the deliberative assemblies of church government.
- The movement does not recognize the position of any person who currently claims to be a functioning prophet, seer and revelator as legitimate. Various factions have formed into separate movements following various prophets, notably the Remnant Church of Jesus Christ of Latter Day Saints.
- The Restoration Branches movement regards changes to the restored gospel (as understood by them to have been taught and practiced in the Church of Christ organized under Joseph Smith, and reorganized under Joseph Smith III) and to the ordinances of the church as apostasy and an abomination in the sight of God.
- As previously mentioned, most Restoration Branches are close-communionists, meaning that although all are welcome to attend church meetings, they do not serve the sacrament to non-members.

== Differences from each other ==
Each Restoration Branch currently exists as an independent entity. Though all generally follow the traditional doctrines of the RLDS church, many have unique views on specific doctrinal and church government-related issues, and specific standpoints differ from member to member. These include:

- Tithing: Restoration Branch members have diverse opinions on financial issues. Some believe that one's tithes should be 10% of one's increase (defined as income after expenses) but the exact principle(s) are disputed, as is the distribution of funds. The Restoration Branches are mostly independent of each other and each determine how the funds they collect are spent.
- Doctrine and Covenants vs Book of Commandments: Most Restoration Saints (as church members are called) believe only the Doctrine and Covenants should be officially recognized, but some groups argue for the supremacy of the Book of Commandments.
- Holy Ghost vs Holy Spirit: Most Restoration members believe the Holy Ghost and Holy Spirit to be the same thing, as part of the Godhead but others argue that the Holy Ghost, Holy Spirit and Comforter are separate entities.
- Divorce (and remarriage): Some Restoration Branches and members believe that a couple's marriage covenant remains literally "until death do they part." They would consider someone who divorced a spouse and remarried as being in adultery and use the term "serial marriage" to describe such situations. The term "serial marriage" has a political meaning that implies a similarity to "plural marriage". (the RLDS have always rejected plural marriage)

== Organizations ==
Different organizations have formed in the Restoration, attempting to unify the branches.

- The Joint Conference of Restoration Branches (JCRB) was formed during a conference November 10–13, 2005.
- The Conference of Restoration Elders' councils act as a Restoration news and information service. They maintain a schedule for joint activities (including youth activities) and services, and generally assist with many common church goals, such as missionary work.
- The Pastors of Zion is an informal meeting of the chief executive officers of some Restoration Branches, most of whom reside in the Independence, Missouri area. They hold an annual joint communion service for all members each April, usually by renting the Independence Auditorium from the Community of Christ for this purpose.
