= Schell City, Missouri =

- City
- Location of Schell City, Missouri
- Coordinates: 38°01′09″N 94°07′00″W
- Country: United States
- State: Missouri
- County: Vernon
- Founded: 1871
- Incorporated: 1871
- Named after: Augustus Schell

Area
  - Total: 0.63 sq mi (1.63 km^{2})
  - Land: 0.62 sq mi (1.61 km^{2})
  - Water: 0.0077 sq mi (0.02 km^{2})
- Elevation: 768 ft (234 m)

Population (2020)
  - Total: 228
  - Density: 367.1/sq mi (141.74/km^{2})
- Time zone: UTC-6 (Central (CST))
  - Summer (DST): UTC-5 (CDT)
- ZIP code: 64783
- Area code: 417
- FIPS code: 29-66134
- GNIS feature ID: 2396553

Schell City is a city in northeast Vernon County, Missouri, United States. As of the 2020 census, Schell City had a population of 228.

== History ==
Schell City was laid out in 1871. The city was named for one of its original proprietors, Augustus Schell of New York. A post office has been in operation at Schell City since 1871.

== Geography ==
Schell City is located at the intersection of Missouri routes C and AA approximately 1.5 miles south of the Osage River channel. The Schell-Osage Conservation Area lies adjacent to the east side of the community. Nevada lies approximately 17 miles to the southwest.

According to the United States Census Bureau, the city has a total area of 0.63 square miles (1.63 km^{2}), of which 0.62 square miles (1.61 km^{2}) is land and 0.01 square miles (0.03 km^{2}) is water.

== Demographics ==
Historical population
| Census | Pop. | Note | %± |
|---|---|---|---|
| 1880 | 676 | | — |
| 1890 | 847 | | 25.3% |
| 1900 | 668 | | −21.1% |
| 1910 | 562 | | −15.9% |
| 1920 | 596 | | 6.0% |
| 1930 | 413 | | −30.7% |
| 1940 | 454 | | 9.9% |
| 1950 | 400 | | −11.9% |
| 1960 | 343 | | −14.2% |
| 1970 | 367 | | 7.0% |
| 1980 | 327 | | −10.9% |
| 1990 | 292 | | −10.7% |
| 2000 | 286 | | −2.1% |
| 2010 | 249 | | −12.9% |
| 2020 | 228 | | −8.4% |
U.S. Decennial Census

=== 2010 census ===
As of the census of 2010, there were 249 people, 115 households, and 66 families living in the city. The population density was 401.6 inhabitants per square mile (155.1/km^{2}). There were 133 housing units at an average density of 214.5 per square mile (82.8/km^{2}). The racial makeup of the city was 97.6% White, 1.6% Native American, and 0.8% from two or more races. Hispanic or Latino of any race were 1.6% of the population.

There were 115 households, of which 28.7% had children under the age of 18 living with them, 36.5% were married couples living together, 11.3% had a female householder with no husband present, 9.6% had a male householder with no wife present, and 42.6% were non-families. 40.0% of all households were made up of individuals, and 20% had someone living alone who was 65 years of age or older. The average household size was 2.17 and the average family size was 2.89.

The median age in the city was 39.9 years. 27.3% of residents were under the age of 18; 9.5% were between the ages of 18 and 24; 19.2% were from 25 to 44; 24.4% were from 45 to 64; and 19.3% were 65 years of age or older. The gender makeup of the city was 49.8% male and 50.2% female.

=== 2000 census ===
As of the census of 2000, there were 286 people, 128 households, and 84 families living in the city. The population density was 454.3 inhabitants per square mile (175.4/km^{2}). There were 161 housing units at an average density of 255.7 per square mile (98.7/km^{2}). The racial makeup of the city was 100.00% White. Hispanic or Latino of any race were 1.05% of the population.

There were 128 households, out of which 27.3% had children under the age of 18 living with them, 55.5% were married couples living together, 7.0% had a female householder with no husband present, and 33.6% were non-families. 32.8% of all households were made up of individuals, and 14.8% had someone living alone who was 65 years of age or older. The average household size was 2.23 and the average family size was 2.78.

In the city the population was spread out, with 25.5% under the age of 18, 5.6% from 18 to 24, 22.7% from 25 to 44, 29.0% from 45 to 64, and 17.1% who were 65 years of age or older. The median age was 42 years. For every 100 females there were 98.6 males. For every 100 females age 18 and over, there were 93.6 males.

The median income for a household in the city was $20,500, and the median income for a family was $27,813. Males had a median income of $20,000 versus $16,094 for females. The per capita income for the city was $11,027. About 19.8% of families and 25.7% of the population were below the poverty line, including 30.0% of those under the age of eighteen and 21.3% of those 65 or over.

== See also ==
- Church of Israel, a religious group headquartered in Schell City
- Church of Christ at Halley's Bluff, another religious group headquartered in Schell City, being the ancestor of the Church of Israel, to whom it lost most of its members
