= Church of Jesus Christ Restored (Ontario) =

Latter Day Saint sect in Chatsworth, Canada

Coordinates: 44.455296°N 80.858872°W

- Classification: Restorationist
- Orientation: Latter Day Saint movement
- Prophet: Fred King
- Master oway: L. King
- Headquarters: 396827 Concession 2, Chatsworth, Ontario, Canada
- Founder: Stanley King
- Origin: Late 1960s
- Separated from: Reorganized Church of Jesus Christ of Latter Day Saints
- Members: About 40

The Church of Jesus Christ Restored is a small sect in the Latter Day Saint movement based at Chatsworth, Ontario, Canada. The church was founded in the late 1960s by Stanley M. King and is currently led by his son, Fred King. It reportedly has under 40 members, down from a high of around 80.

The group started as a fundamentalist offshoot of the Reorganized Church of Jesus Christ of Latter Day Saints (RLDS Church, now known as the Community of Christ). Like other fundamentalist Latter Day Saint churches, members practice polygamy and a form of the communal United Order. The church also runs a printing business called Resto Graphics, based in Mississauga, Ontario.

After breaking from the RLDS Church, Stan King (known as "Prophet" by his followers) reinstated the old Mormon practice of plural marriage. Former church member Carol Christie claims King already had three "church wives" when she married him in the 1970s. One of his other wives was 14 years old at the time. Christie claims King later married three other wives, ranging in age from ten to 17.

In the 1980s, the church moved from a farmhouse in Sauble Beach to its current headquarters, a bankrupt ski resort near Chatsworth, Ontario.

King died of stroke in 1986 at the age of 58. Church members prayed for his resurrection and kept his body unburied for a week, but King remained dead. Following King's death, leadership of the church passed to his son, Fred. The younger King also took on his father's wives, and allegedly has had as many as seven wives at one time.

The Ontario Provincial Police initiated an investigation of the church following a CTV Television Network news story about alleged polygamy and abuse by church leaders. The investigation was ongoing as of April 2013. Bruce Grey Family and Children's Services also investigated the church, but found no evidence of children being harmed.

== Criminal charges ==
In April 2014, after a 16-month police investigation, authorities charged Fred King and his brother Judson William King with 31 counts dating from 1978 to 2008. Two Canada-wide arrest warrants were issued, and on April 4, Judson was apprehended and charged with "assault with a weapon, uttering death threats and four counts of assault." Fred King was arrested on April 11 without incident and was released on $50,000 conditional bail on April 16. Fred King was charged with sexual exploitation, sexual interference, three counts of sexual assault, three counts of assault causing bodily harm, four counts of uttering death threats, two counts of assault with a weapon, and 10 counts of assault. The brothers were scheduled to attend first-appearance court in the Ontario Court of Justice in Owen Sound, Ontario, on May 15, 2014.

Preliminary hearings were set for both Judson and Fred King on November 17, 2014, and March 23–25, 2015, respectively. A publication ban has also been imposed. As of March 25, 2015, both Judson and Fred King were committed to stand trial.

In 2016 they were found guilty.
