= Restoration Church of Jesus Christ of Latter Day Saints =

Christian denomination within the Latter-day Saint movement

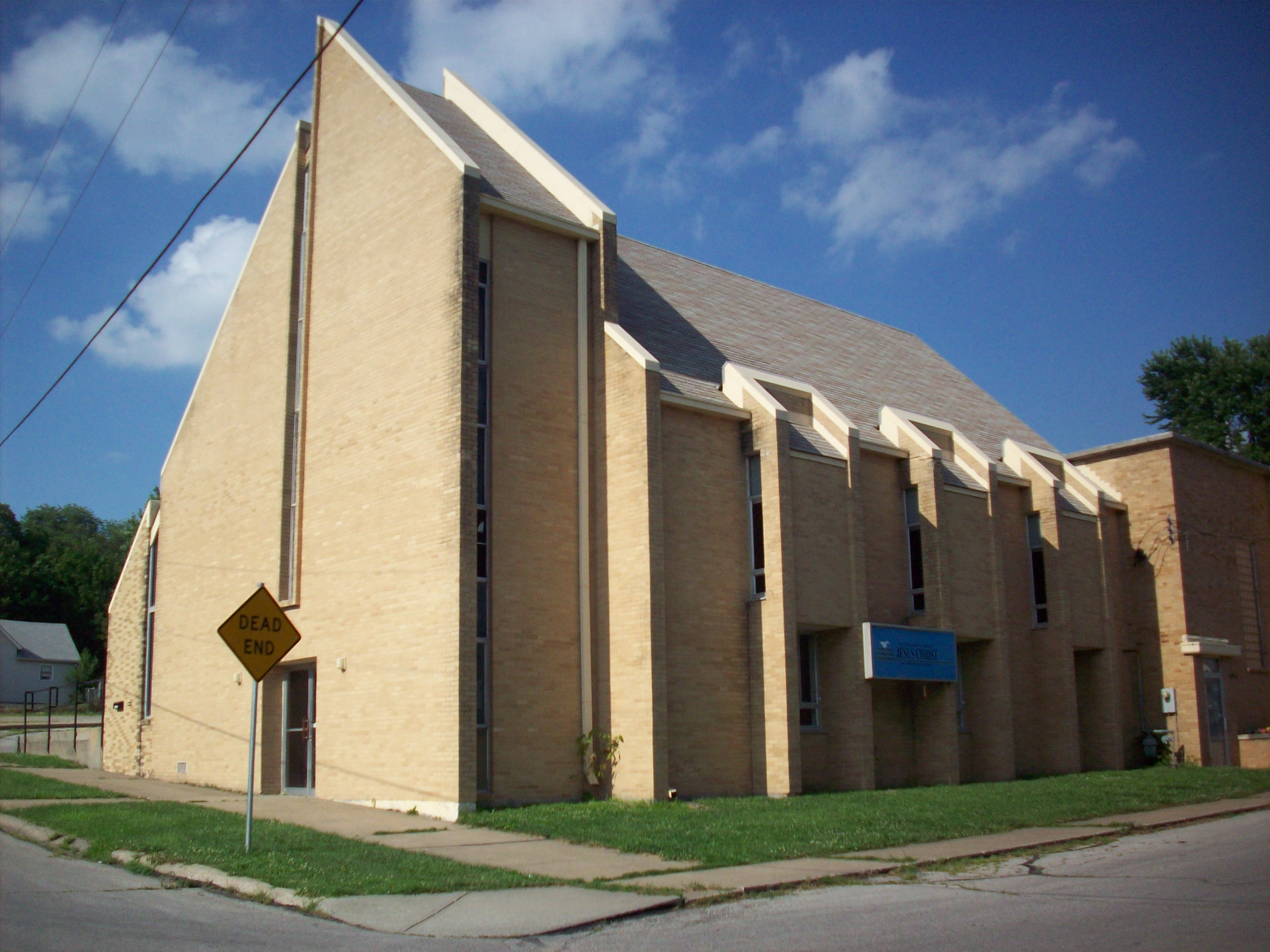
- Restoration Church of Jesus Christ of LDS Meetinghouse in Independence, Missouri
- Classification: Latter Day Saint movement
- Orientation: Latter Day Saints
- Polity: Church conference
- Moderator: First Presidency: Woodrow Howell
- Region: United States
- Founder: M. Norman Page and Marcus Juby
- Origin: 1991; Independence, Missouri
- Separated from: Community of Christ
- Congregations: 9
- Official website: https://restorationchurch.net/

The Restoration Church of Jesus Christ of Latter Day Saints is a denomination of the Latter Day Saint movement headquartered in Independence, Missouri. The church was formally organized on April 6, 1991, primarily by members of the Community of Christ (through the Restoration Branches movement) who had grown disaffected with the church when it began ordaining women and introduced other innovations in the late-20th century.

The early history of the church was heavily influenced by M. Norman Page, a Seventy in the Community of Christ who claimed to receive two revelations calling for a reorganization of the church. In 1993, Marcus Juby was ordained as the first President of the High Priesthood and President of the Church, a position which he held until his resignation in 2001. Mark Evans was chosen as president shortly after Juby's resignation.

In early 2007 President Mark Evans resigned for personal reasons. His counselor in the First Presidency, Woodrow ("Woody") Howell, became acting president. Howell was elected by the April 2009 General Conference of the Restoration Church as Prophet-President of the Church, and was set apart to that office on April 11, 2009. President Howell serves with Andy Gross as counselor in the presidency.

== Sacred texts ==
- The Inspired Version of the Bible, as 'translated' by Latter Day Saint movement founder Joseph Smith.
- The Book of Mormon, considered to be a record of the Nephites.
- Doctrine and Covenants up to and including Section 144 of the Community of Christ edition.
- The Restoration Revelations, authorized by the 1995 General Assembly, consists of inspired revelations presented to, and accepted by, the General Assemblies of the Church as the mind and will of God. As of April 2003, it contains 36 such documents.

== Baptism ==
The ordinance of baptism is performed by immersion for those aged 8 or older. According to Restoration Revelations 24:11-12 (published in April, 1998), only the priesthood of the Restoration Church has the authority from God to perform baptisms. All baptisms in other Latter Day Saint groups, and in all other Christian churches, are invalid and have no efficacy. "When those who were baptized outside the authority of my church seek membership, they must be rebaptized by those who have authority." (RR 24:11)
