= Community of Christ =

Christian denomination within the Latter-day Saint movement

- Abbreviation: CofC
- Classification: Restorationist
- Orientation: Latter-day Saint movement
- Scripture: Bible; Book of Mormon; Doctrine and Covenants
- Theology: Liberal Mormonism (with Continuing revelation, Mainline Protestant and Trinitarian elements)
- Polity: Hierarchical
- Prophet-President: Stassi D. Cramm
- Associations: National Council of Churches
- Headquarters: Independence, Missouri, United States
- Founder: Joseph Smith III
- Origin: April 6, 1830 (Church of Christ); April 6, 1860 (Reorganization); April 6, 2001 (Community of Christ); Fayette, New York, United States; Reorganized: Amboy, Illinois, United States
- Separations: Josephite denominations (such as Restoration Church of Jesus Christ of Latter Day Saints, Restoration branches and Church of Jesus Christ (Zion's Branch))
- Congregations: 1,100
- Members: 250,000
- Tertiary institutions: 1
- Other name: Reorganized Church of Jesus Christ of Latter Day Saints (legal name)
- Official website: cofchrist.org

The Community of Christ (CofC), known as the Reorganized Church of Jesus Christ of Latter Day Saints (RLDS) from 1872 to 2001, is a US-based international church, and is the second-largest denomination in the Latter Day Saint movement after the Church of Jesus Christ of Latter-day Saints (LDS Church). The church reports approximately 250,000 members in 1,100 congregations in 59 countries. The church traces its origins to Joseph Smith's establishment of the Church of Christ on April 6, 1830. His eldest son, Joseph Smith III, formally accepted leadership of the church on April 6, 1860, in the aftermath of the 1844 death of Joseph Smith.

Community of Christ is a Restorationist faith, but many practices and beliefs are congruent with mainline Protestant Christianity. While it generally rejects the term Mormon to describe its members, the church abides by a number of theological distinctions unusual outside Mormonism, including but not limited to: ongoing prophetic leadership, a priesthood polity, the use of the Book of Mormon and the Doctrine and Covenants as scripture, belief in the cause of Zion, the building of temples, and adherence to their interpretation of the Word of Wisdom. In many respects, the church differs from the larger LDS Church and most other Latter Day Saint denominations in its religious liberalism, belief in a more traditional conception of the trinity (as opposed to the social trinitarianism of the godhead), and rejection of exaltation and the plan of salvation. Salvation is considered a personal matter and not subject to dogma, but salvation by grace alone is emphasized. The church considers itself to be non-creedal and accepts people with a wide range of beliefs. Church teachings emphasize that "all are called" as "persons of worth" to "share the peace of Christ".

Community of Christ worship follows a free-form worship placing more of the foundation on scripture based on the Revised Common Lectionary. From its headquarters in Independence, Missouri, the church offers a special focus on evangelism, peace and justice ministries, spirituality and wholeness, youth ministries and outreach ministries.

== History ==
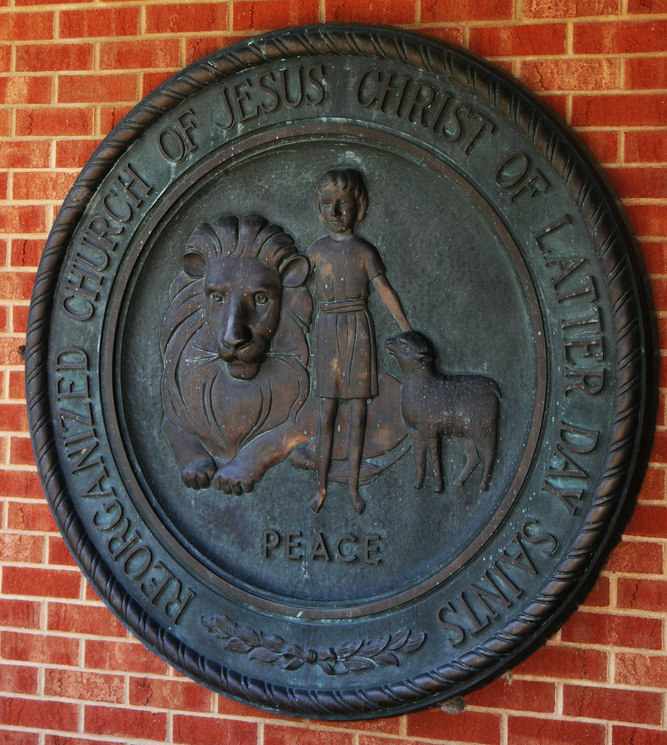
Photo of historical church seal (as the "Reorganized Church of Jesus Christ of Latter Day Saints") in Nauvoo, Illinois

Formerly known as the Reorganized Church of Jesus Christ of Latter Day Saints, the Community of Christ regards itself as the true embodiment of the original church organized in 1830 by Joseph Smith, and it regards Joseph Smith III, the eldest surviving son of Smith, to have been his legitimate successor. The church was "legally organized on April 6, 1830, in Fayette, New York". The formal reorganization occurred on April 6, 1860, in Amboy, Illinois, as the "Church of Jesus Christ of Latter Day Saints", adding the word Reorganized to the church name in 1872. The church was founded based on a pattern of lineal succession through Joseph Smith of Prophet/presidents of the church, and as a mainstream alternative to the Strangites and the larger LDS church led by Brigham Young. It has a long history as a Midwestern wing of the Latter Day Saint movement. It also had a long history of vocal opposition to plural marriage within the Latter Day Saint movement.

Community of Christ considers the period from 1830 to 1844 to be a part of its early history and from 1844, the year of the death of the prophet-founder, to 1860, to be a period of disorganization. Since 1844, the doctrines and practices of the Community of Christ have evolved separately from the other denominations of the Latter Day Saint movement.

=== Changes in beliefs and practices ===
The Community of Christ Temple in Independence, Missouri, US. Dedicated in 1994.

During the twentieth century, the then-Reorganized Church underwent what some scholars termed an "RLDS Reformation" in which the denomination's leadership pivoted toward mainline Protestant religious thought. Since the 1960s, the church's proselytizing outside North America have caused a re-assessment and gradual evolution of its traditional practices and beliefs.

A revelation presented by Wallace B. Smith in 1984 decreed the construction of the Independence Temple and the ordination of women to the priesthood, after long-standing calls for both. Following the retirement of Smith as Prophet-President of the Church, W. Grant McMurray was appointed as the new President. Although McMurray had been designated prophet-president by Smith, some members objected because he was the first church president who was not a direct descendant of Joseph Smith, which they considered to be a distinguishing trait from other denominations of the Latter Day Saint movement.

These changes, among others, were controversial among the membership, and they led to the formation of breakaway churches such as the Remnant Church of Jesus Christ of Latter Day Saints; in 1994, former church historian Richard P. Howard estimated that 25,000 members had left to join such groups. Between the mid-1960s and the late 1990s, there was a one-third decline in new baptisms in the United States along with a 50 percent drop in contributions in the decade before 1998. The decline in membership was offset somewhat by an increase in converts outside the United States. Growth continues to be driven by missions outside the US, particularly in the developing world and in Australia. In recent years, the church has attracted many ex-Mormons.

The vision and mission statements of the Community of Christ were adopted in 1996 by the leading quorums of the church's leadership and reflect the peace and justice centered ministries of the denomination. In its mission statement, the church declares that "[w]e proclaim Jesus Christ and promote communities of joy, hope, love and peace." The vision statement states that "We will become a worldwide church dedicated to the pursuit of peace, reconciliation, and healing of the spirit."

== Sites ==
The church owns and operates the Independence Temple, which serves as its headquarters in Independence, Missouri. The church also owns and operates some Latter Day Saint historic sites in Lamoni, Iowa, and Plano, Illinois. The Auditorium in Independence housed the Children's Peace Pavilion until it was renamed the Peace Pavilion and moved into its own facility just east of the Temple complex. The Auditorium is the site of the major legislative assembly of the Community of Christ, which convenes during the triennial World Conference. The church sponsors Graceland University, with a campus in Lamoni and another in Independence, where the School of Nursing and the Community of Christ Seminary are based.

For over a century, the denomination owned and operated the Kirtland Temple. The Church of Jesus Christ of Latter-day Saints (LDS Church) purchased the Kirtland Temple and took on ownership as of March 5, 2024. Several previously Community-of-Christ-owned historic sites in Nauvoo, Illinois—including the Red Brick Store, Smith Family Homestead, and Mansion House—also transferred ownership as part of the same acquisition.

== Teachings and practices ==
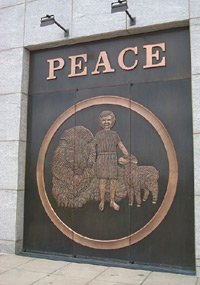
Church seal (including a child with the lamb and lion) on a set of doors to the Independence Temple

The Community of Christ states that it recognizes that "perception of truth is always qualified by human nature and experience" and it therefore has not adopted an official religious creed. Nevertheless, the Community of Christ offers a number of the commonly held beliefs of its members and leaders as the "generally accepted beliefs of the church". As Stephen M. Veazey, president of the church stated in 2006, "Community of Christ is a church that provides light for the way as well as space for the personal faith journey."

After the death of Smith rended the initial movement, Community of Christ emerged as what historian Jan Shipps called a simultaneous "new creation" and "extension... of the original". In the twentieth century, Community of Christ underwent a "liberal protestantization" and is "[l]ike other mainline and liberal Protestantisms", Vanel explains.

The Community of Christ generally accepts the doctrine of the Trinity and other commonly held Christian beliefs. The concept of Zion as both a present reality of Christian living and as a hoped for community of the future is a rather strongly held belief in the Community of Christ and it ties closely to the peace and justice emphasis of the denomination. The movement also differs from most other Christian faiths in its belief in prophetic leadership, in the Book of Mormon, and in an open canon of scripture recorded in its version of the Doctrine and Covenants, which is regularly appended.

=== God, Jesus Christ, and the Holy Spirit ===
The Community of Christ teaches that the "one eternal living God is triune". It acknowledges God, who is a "community of three persons", as the Creator and the Source of love, life, and truth. It states that "[t]his God alone is worthy of worship." Jesus Christ is described as both Savior and as "a living expression of God" and is acknowledged as having lived, died, and been resurrected. As the name of the denomination implies, Jesus Christ is central to its members' study and worship. The Community of Christ's Theology Task Force states that "Jesus Christ is the Word made flesh, both fully human and fully divine." The Holy Spirit is described as the "continuing presence of God in the world" and as the source of divine inspiration.

=== Peace ===
In keeping with the Community of Christ's role as a "peace and justice church", the Independence Temple was "dedicated to the pursuit of peace". Every day at 1 pm a Daily Prayer for Peace is held in the sanctuary of the Independence Temple. The church's peace position was influenced by the Mennonite Central Committee Peace and Justice Education Associate. In addition, the Community of Christ International Peace Award has been bestowed annually since 1993 (except 1996). The call to "peace, reconciliation, and healing of the spirit" is a recurring theme of the Community of Christ and is reflected in its official vision statement. Doctrinal statements by the church suggest that "because of our commitment to Christ and belief in the worth of all people and the value of community building, we dedicate our lives to the pursuit of peace and justice for all people."

=== Concept of Zion ===
The concept of Zion in the Community of Christ relates to a theology of the "kingdom of God". As a doctrine, it is therefore closely founded upon the kingdom parables of Jesus as recorded in the four gospels. Based on references in the Bible to Mt. Zion or simply Zion, it was initially regarded as a city, sometimes called the New Jerusalem. Prior to 1920, most members of the RLDS Church identified Independence, Missouri, as Zion or the New Jerusalem. As New Testament understandings of basileia, as the realm or the domain of God, have gradually taken root among members of the denomination, Zion is now understood more as a cause, as a way of living or as a state of existence, and is usually not regarded as having its foundation in a specific place. Officially, the denomination states that "[t]he 'cause of Zion' expresses our commitment to pursuing God's kingdom through the establishment of Christ-centered communities in families, congregations, neighborhoods, cities, and throughout the world." While the Concept of Zion is rarely associated with Zionism, some members of the RLDS Church from Maine, intrigued by the doctrine of Zion, established a refugee center near Tel Aviv during the initial return of the Jewish diaspora to Israel in the early 1900s.

=== Priesthood ===
Nearly one in ten members of the church hold a priesthood office. These are primarily unpaid bi-vocational ministers. The church does maintain a relatively small group of professional ministers who typically serve as administrators, financial officers or missionaries. Priesthood members are called to teach and preach the gospel or "good news" of Jesus Christ. The ministry of the church at the congregational level is led by priesthood members and is carried out by all members of the priesthood and the laity. In most congregations the pastors and other elected and appointed leadership positions are unpaid positions. The right of women to hold the priesthood was recognized by a church conference in 1984.

=== Stewardship ===
The "Disciples' Generous Response" (or "A Disciple's Generous Response") was announced in April 2002 as the name given by the Community of Christ to a major rethinking of its stewardship theology and practices. Prior to this program, members of the Community of Christ were taught that a stewardship principle known as "increase" determined the base amount for tithing to be paid to the church.

Based in part on teachings by writers such as Walter Brueggemann and Leonard Sweet, the Disciple's Generous Response can be traced to a theology or liturgy of abundance, as well as the principle of receiving God's abundance. Like many recent enhancements of church doctrine and practice, it is described as belonging to a postmodernism trend in thinking within the church. While carefully built upon the many differing stewardship principles in both overall Christian and specific Community of Christ traditions, the new thinking emphasizes a natural generosity in all of life lived as response to the overwhelming and incomparable generosity of God. As such, tithing is not limited to World Church giving as in the past, or even to the church at all. Through the principle of community tithes, almost any charitable organization to which a disciple contributes could be considered tithing. While most giving is now seen as tithing, the typical interpretation is that a majority of one's tithing should be given in Mission Tithes (Tithes to Local and World Church) and the minority to Community Tithes (Organizations like Outreach International, Graceland University, Restoration Trails Foundation, World Accord, etc.). The church teaches the principle of community tithes believing that it will not decrease giving to the church, but rather increase it as more members embrace a fully generous and responsive way of living.

=== Sacraments ===
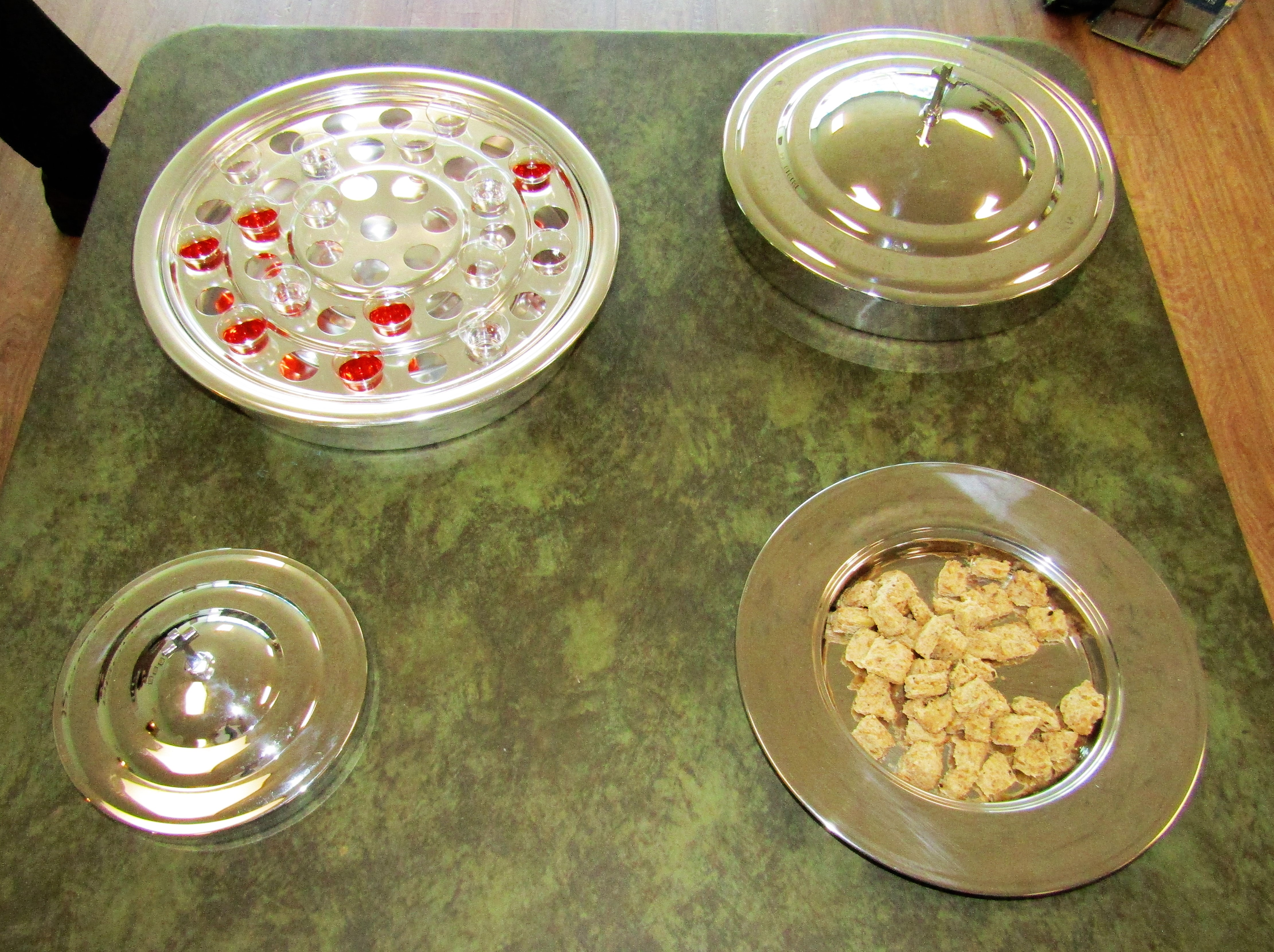
Communion for a Community of Christ meeting in Provo, Utah

Members commonly believe that sacraments (or ordinances) express the abiding presence of God in the life of the church, its members and priesthood. Sacraments are considered metaphorical acts designed to create and renew a person's spiritual relationship with God. Sacraments are viewed as covenants with God in response to God's grace. The Community of Christ practices eight sacraments: baptism, confirmation, blessing of children, The Lord's Supper, marriage, ministration to the sick, ordination, and Evangelist's Blessing. Laying on of hands is used in confirmation, ordination, the blessing of children, ministration to the sick, and Evangelist's blessing.

=== Scripture ===
The Community of Christ points to Jesus Christ as the living Word of God and it affirms the Bible (including but not limited to the Inspired Version of the Holy Scriptures) along with the Book of Mormon and the Doctrine and Covenants, as scripture for the church. The Community of Christ view of scripture is that it should be "reasonably interpreted and faithfully applied". Scripture references provided for congregational worship generally follow the Revised Common Lectionary. The church views the Book of Mormon and the Doctrine and Covenants as "additional witnesses of Christ's ministry and God's love." The Community of Christ understands scripture as an inspired record of God's activity with humanity. While it recognizes scripture as the revelation of God, its members would not typically suggest that scriptures constitute the literal "words of God".

==== Bible ====
In unity with Christianity, the Community of Christ upholds the Bible as scripture. Adherents read and reference both the Hebrew Old Testament and the Christian New Testament in public worship as well as in private study. The church encourages prayerful meditation upon the meaning and the importance of Bible passages. "If any of you is lacking in wisdom, ask God, who gives to all generously and ungrudgingly, and it will be given you. But ask in faith, never doubting" (James 1:5–6) is an oft quoted passage from the New Testament, as well as being the scripture reference that Joseph Smith read when he was trying, as a boy, to determine what church to join. His experience following his reading of this scripture resulted in the eventual organization of the Church of Christ.

The Community of Christ does not prescribe a single translation of the Bible. Although Smith began a project to revise the King James Version by inspiration during his lifetime, the liturgy of the church today is usually based on more recent translations of the Bible. Upon Smith's death, the working manuscript of his translation was retained by his family and came into the possession of the Community of Christ. The work was edited and is published by the church as the Inspired Version of the Bible. Since it largely relies on the language of the King James Version, most official publications of the Community of Christ quote scripture from newer versions such as the New Revised Standard Version (NRSV). The Community of Christ does not view scripture, including the Bible, as inerrant. Members are encouraged to understand the historical and literary context of Bible passages and are not required to interpret all of the language literally.

==== Book of Mormon ====
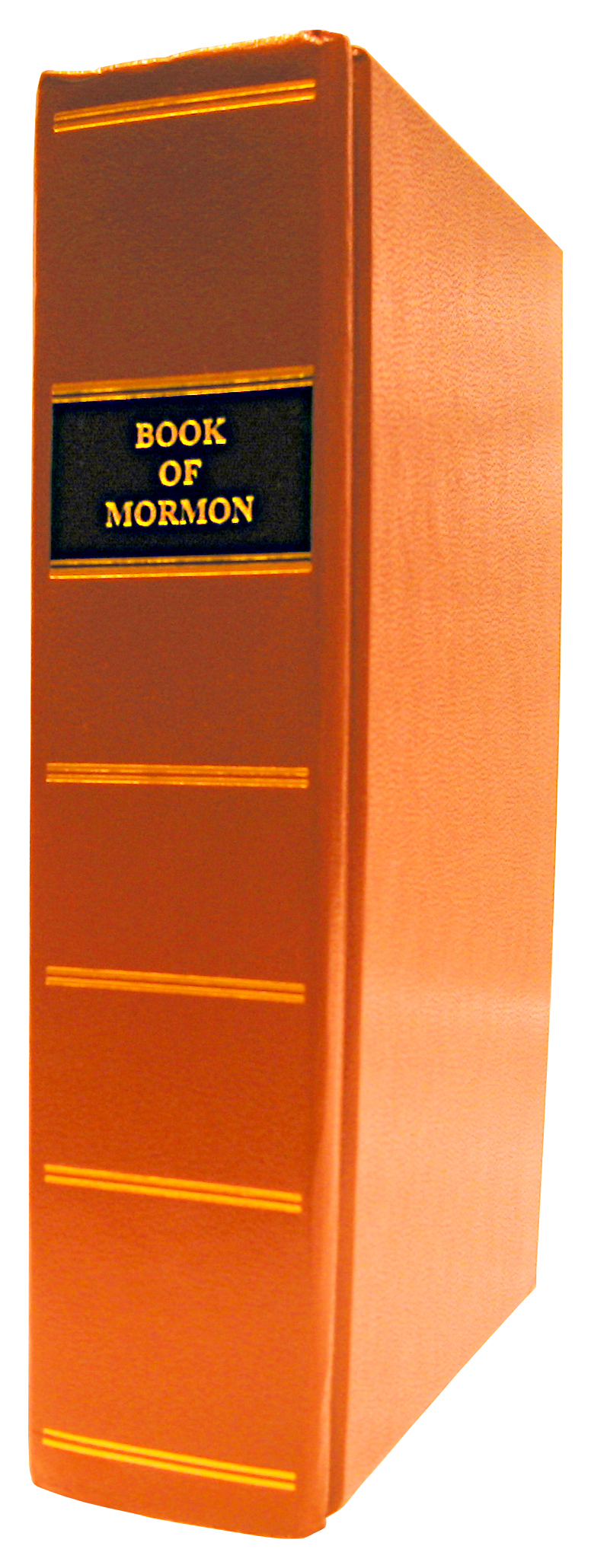
Book of Mormon 1830 reprint (facsimile of first copy of the Book of Mormon) by Herald Heritage. Reprinted in 1970, Independence, Missouri.

The Community of Christ views the Book of Mormon as an additional witness of Jesus Christ and publishes two versions of the book through its official publishing arm, Herald House. The Authorized Edition is based on the original printer's manuscript and the 1837 Second Edition (or Kirtland Edition) of the Book of Mormon. Its content is similar to the Book of Mormon published by the Church of Jesus Christ of Latter-day Saints (LDS Church), but the versification is different. The Community of Christ also publishes a 1966 "Revised Authorized Edition" which attempts to modernize some of the language.

In 2001, church president W. Grant McMurray reflected on increasing questions about the Book of Mormon: "The proper use of the Book of Mormon as sacred scripture has been under wide discussion in the 1970s and beyond, in part because of long-standing questions about its historicity and in part because of perceived theological inadequacies, including matters of race and ethnicity."

At the 2007 Community of Christ World Conference, church president Stephen M. Veazey ruled as out of order a resolution to "reaffirm the Book of Mormon as a divinely inspired record". In so doing he stated that "while the Church affirms the Book of Mormon as scripture, and makes it available for study and use in various languages, we do not attempt to mandate the degree of belief or use. This position is in keeping with our longstanding tradition that belief in the Book of Mormon is not to be used as a test of fellowship or membership in the church."

The Community of Christ's official stance has stated about the Book of Mormon (under Affirmation Nine):

With other Christians, we affirm the Bible as the foundational scripture for the church. In addition, the Community of Christ uses the Book of Mormon and the Doctrine and Covenants as scripture. We do not use these sacred writings to replace the witness of the Bible or improve upon it, but because they confirm its message that Jesus Christ is the Living Word of God (Preface of the Book of Mormon; Doctrine and Covenants 76:3g).

==== Book of Doctrine and Covenants ====
The Community of Christ edition of the Doctrine and Covenants is a growing work of scripture containing inspired documents given through the prophet-presidents recognized by the Community of Christ.

=== Ecumenism and interfaith activities ===
The Community of Christ has made efforts to reconcile with traditional Christianity and to reach out to other Christians. The Community of Christ frequently notes that it has never sanctioned polygamy; it has always ordained persons of any race; it has no required creedal statement, asking only that people profess faith in Christ as a condition for baptism; it has accepted Trinitarian doctrine; it has been in dialogue with the National Council of Churches (NCC), the World Council of Churches (WCC), and Christian Churches Together; and it has practiced open communion since 1994. On November 10, 2010, the Community of Christ was unanimously approved for membership by the NCC, becoming the 37th member communion of this ecumenical body.

In its World Conference in 2002, a committee on "Ecumenical/Interfaith Relations" was established to explore the possibility of entering into the membership of the WCC. In its report for the 2004 World Conference, the committee concluded that while there was an openness to further meetings and discussions, there were concerns about several issues including new entrance criteria based on theology and the Community of Christ's acceptance of extra-biblical scriptures. The report states that this warrants caution in their approach, but the dialogue would continue.

=== Women's participation ===
The church's priesthood was opened to women in 1984. In 1998, Gail E. Mengel and Linda L. Booth became the first two women apostles in the church. At the 2007 World Conference of the church, Becky L. Savage was ordained as the first woman to serve in the First Presidency. In 2013, Linda L. Booth became the first woman elected to serve as president of the Council of Twelve. In 2016, Stassi D. Cramm became the first woman presiding bishop of the church and Jane M. Gardner became the church's first female presiding evangelist. On Sunday, June 1, 2025, Cramm was ordained the church's ninth, and first female, prophet-president.

=== LGBTQ participation ===
In 1982, progressive churches founded the Gay and Lesbian Acceptance network (renamed Harmony in 2019) for the inclusion of LGBTQ people.

For a period of time, the church under the presidency of W. Grant McMurray allowed the priesthood ordination of practicing LGBTQ, something which he acknowledged was already occurring. The church would later halt this practice, prohibiting the ordination of sexually active LGBTQ. However, the church allows those who were ordained against policy to continue in priesthood office.

=== Marriage ===
In 2012, the Community of Christ held national conferences in Canada and Australia both of which recommended to church leadership to change standing policies regarding ordination to include those in same-sex marriage (Canada) and in marriage-like same-sex committed relationships (Australia), and in Canada to extend the sacrament of marriage to same-sex couples. Official policy changes for these nations have since been released that follow the recommendations of these conferences.

The Community of Christ's 2013 USA National Conference like those in Canada and Australia recommended changes. Those changes were recommended for the extension of the sacrament of marriage to same-sex couples in states where same-sex marriages are legal, the extension of covenant commitment services for same-sex couples in states where same-sex marriages are not legal, and extending eligibility for the priesthood call sacrament to all church members regardless of sexual orientation or open same-sex relationship. As a result of these recommendations, church leadership released in March 2014 policy embracing the recommendations for the church in the United States.

Ireland and Great Britain held a special multi-nation conference in 2013 which also recommended changes to policy similar to those of Canada, Australia, and the United States. The changes have yet to be approved by the First Presidency and Council of Twelve for Ireland and Great Britain, with the likely time-frame to "develop, approve, and implement interim policies" being up to one year after the 2013 Conferences.

Harmony brings together 32 churches in 3 countries in 2025 that support blessings of same-sex marriage.

== Organization and structure ==
The Community of Christ Stone Church in Independence, Missouri, formerly the church headquarters

The Community of Christ is led by a First Presidency, consisting of a president and two counselors. The president is regarded as a prophet. The church's ministry is overseen by a Council of Twelve Apostles and the financial concerns of the church are overseen by the Presiding Bishopric. Meeting together, these three quorums are known as the World Church Leadership Council.

Other key leadership positions include Presiding Evangelist, Senior President of the Presidents of Seventy, President of the High Priests Quorum, and Ecumenical and Interfaith Officer. Every three years (formerly two, until a change made in 2007), delegates from around the world meet together with these leaders to vote on church business in World Conference.

The Community of Christ has 250,000 members in 1,100 congregations in 59 countries according to the most recent report. Membership is distributed as 30,000 in Africa, 9,000 in Asia, 8,000 in Canada, 13,250 in the Caribbean, 2,500 in Europe, 12,250 in the Pacific and Australia, 4,500 in Central and South America, and 117,000 in the United States according to the 2016 World Conference Bulletin.

The church is present in an official capacity in these countries and territories: Argentina, Australia, Belgium, Bolivia, Brazil, Canada, the Cayman Islands, Chile, Colombia, Ivory Coast, Democratic Republic of the Congo, Dominican Republic, El Salvador, Fiji, France, French Polynesia, Germany, Guam, Guatemala, Haiti, Honduras, Hungary, India, Jamaica, Japan, Kenya, Korea, Liberia, Malawi, Mexico, the Netherlands, New Caledonia, New Zealand, Nigeria, Norway, Papua New Guinea, Peru, the Philippines, Republic of the Congo, South Africa, Spain, Sri Lanka, Switzerland, Taiwan, Ukraine, the United Kingdom, the United States, Venezuela, Zambia, and Zimbabwe.

It is estimated that more than half of the active members of the church speak a primary language other than English. The church translates resources into French, Spanish, Portuguese, Russian, Telugu, Kwi, Sora, Tahitian, Chewa, Chibemba, Efik, Lingala and Swahili.

For the purposes of church organization and administration, the church has divided the world into geographical areas termed fields (which can include areas that are not adjoining, such as Australia and parts of Canada). Each field is presided over by a member of the Council of Twelve Apostles, who are collectively overseen by a member of the First Presidency, in his or her capacity of Director of Field Ministries (this role was previously held by the President of the Council of Twelve but followed the outgoing president when he joined the First Presidency in 2013). Fields are further divided into multiple Mission Centers, which succeeded the former jurisdictional units known as stakes and regions (which were each further divided into the now abolished level of district). Each mission center is presided over by a president. Mission centers are composed of congregations, presided over by a pastor or co-pastors.

The organizational fields are: Africa and Haiti Mission Field, Asia Mission Field, Canada and Australia Mission Field, Caribbean–Mexico Mission Field, Central and South America Mission Field, Eurasia Mission Field, North Central USA/Canada Mission Field, North East USA Mission Field, Pacific Mission Field, South Central USA Mission Field, Southern USA Mission Field and Western USA Mission Field.

== Criticisms ==
Latter-day Saint scholars, including members of the Community of Christ, have sometimes described the church as "adrift", not being distinctively Mormon enough, but not completely mainline either. The church has made a long-standing effort to de-mythologize its past, for example, by taking a pragmatic view of the Book of Mormon and Joseph Smith, both of which the church views as inspired but imperfect. Historian Ken Mulliken has argued that this has led to a policy of "historical amnesia", resulting in a church that has abandoned its past and created a new organization that is focused on social-interaction (Community) and shared mission (Christ).

== See also ==
- Plano Stone Church
- Comparison of the Community of Christ and the LDS Church
- List of churches in the Latter Day Saint Reorganization movement
