= History of the Community of Christ =

The history of Community of Christ, formerly known as the Reorganized Church of Jesus Christ of Latter Day Saints, covers a period of approximately 200 years. The church's early history traces to the revelations of Joseph Smith, who founded the Church of Christ. After Smith's death, a crisis in leadership would lead to several factions forming, some of which would coalesce into the Reorganized Church of Jesus Christ of Latter Day Saints. Under the leadership of Smith's son, Joseph Smith III, the church would develop a more moderate character than other groups within the Latter Day Saint Movement. The church has continued to grow, becoming the second-largest church in the movement at large, behind the Church of Jesus Christ of Latter-day Saints. In 2001, the church changed its name to Community of Christ in order to better reflect its mission as an organization focused on community and Christ.

== Early history ==
The early history of Community of Christ is shared with other denominations in the Latter Day Saint movement, which originated in upstate New York under the leadership of Joseph Smith. With the assistance of Oliver Cowdery and John Whitmer, Smith dictated and published works of scripture believed by followers to be inspired, and formed the Church of Christ. The church lists its establishment as "legally organized on April 6, 1830, in Fayette, New York". The organization grew rapidly, especially after the conversion of Sidney Rigdon and many of the Campbellites in the Kirtland area. The strong beliefs of Smith's followers (e.g. a revealing God) and their sense of close community, often seemed peculiar or even threatening to outsiders. Regularly meeting opposition from their neighbors, the early Latter Day Saints established and were driven from several gathering places including Kirtland, Ohio; Independence, Missouri; Far West, Missouri; and Nauvoo, Illinois. In 1838, the church was renamed as the "Church of Jesus Christ of Latter Day Saints".

The history of Community of Christ began to diverge from the rest of the movement after Smith's murder in Carthage Jail on June 27, 1844.

== Period of disorganization ==
After Smith was killed, the membership of the Church of Jesus Christ of Latter Day Saints fell into confusion and disorganization over the question of succession. Several individuals emerged with claims to leadership and the church's presidency. This led to the formation of several small factions. After periods of debate, the majority of the church's members followed Brigham Young, who led them to the Great Basin area (in what is now Utah) as the Church of Jesus Christ of Latter-day Saints (LDS Church). Other leaders included Sidney Rigdon, James J. Strang, Lyman Wight, Alpheus Cutler, William Smith, and David Whitmer. In the aftermath of this disorganization of the church, the term "Mormon" gradually came to be used primarily in reference to those persons who followed Young and were members of the LDS Church. The remaining individuals—who still considered themselves part of Smith's original church—remained; many who were in scattered congregations throughout the American Midwest joined other factions. Others began forming themselves into a "reorganized" Church of Jesus Christ of Latter Day Saints.

== Reorganization of the church ==
After Smith's death, some Latter Day Saints believed that Smith had designated his eldest son, Joseph Smith III, as his successor; some of these individuals waited for young Joseph to take up his father's mantle. However, Smith III was only 11 years old at the time of his father's death; his mother, Emma Hale Smith, and their family remained in Nauvoo rather than moving to join any of the departing groups.

In the 1850s, groups of Midwestern Latter Day Saints who were unaffiliated with other Latter Day Saint factions began to come together. Leaders, including Jason W. Briggs and Zenas H. Gurley, Sr., began to call for the creation of a "New Organization" of the Latter Day Saint movement. They invited Smith III to lead their New Organization; he accepted only after he believed he received a personal spiritual confirmation that this was the appropriate course of action.

At a conference on April 6, 1860, at Amboy, Illinois, Smith III formally accepted the leadership of what was then known as the Church of Jesus Christ of Latter Day Saints. William Marks, former stake president of Nauvoo, served as Smith III's counselor in the reorganized First Presidency. The word "Reorganized" was added to the church's official name in 1872, mostly as a means of distinguishing it from the larger LDS Church, which at that time was involved in controversy with the U.S. government over its doctrine of plural marriage. The Reorganized Church of Jesus Christ of Latter Day Saints was often abbreviated "RLDS Church".

Over time, many Mormons, mostly in the Midwest, who had not accompanied Brigham Young and his Latter-day Saint followers to what is now Utah, began to join the new and growing Church. They included many former followers of James Strang, whose assassination in Wisconsin in 1856 left them disorganized and leaderless.

== Presidency of Joseph Smith III ==
Initially, Smith III continued to live in Nauvoo, but over time he determined that its relative isolation hampered his administrative duties. He moved to Plano, Illinois, where the church's print house was established; this building served as the headquarters of the RLDS Church. Smith III and his brothers, Alexander Hale Smith and David Hyrum Smith, served many missions for the church, gathering old Latter Day Saints into the Reorganization.

As the church grew, many members were eager to gather together and live some of the teachings of the early church. Although Smith III avoided calling for a new gathering place, he supported the efforts of members who founded a town called Lamoni in southern Iowa. Smith III eventually relocated to Lamoni, which became the headquarters of the church.

During the late-19th century, Smith III and the church were involved in the Kirtland Temple Suit, which attempted to gain clear title for the church over Mormonism's original temple. In 1880, an Ohio court hearing the suit gave an opinion stated that the RLDS Church was the lawful successor of the original church, but ultimately dismissed the case. Although the case had no legal bearing, the Community of Christ secured ownership of the temple through adverse possession by at least 1901. Smith III and the church also were involved in the Temple Lot Suit, which eventually resulted in clearing the title to a portion of the original Temple Lot in Independence, Missouri, for another Latter Day Saint denomination, the Church of Christ (Temple Lot).

Late in life, Smith III moved to Independence, Missouri, which his father had designated as the "centerplace" for the City of Zion. He died on December 10, 1914, having led the RLDS Church for 54 years.

== Presidencies of Frederick M. Smith and Israel A. Smith ==
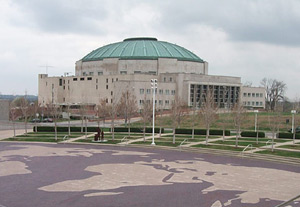
Auditorium in Independence, Missouri, USA, view is overlooking the World Plaza from the Western exit of Community of Christ Temple

Smith III's son, Frederick Madison Smith, was accepted in 1915 as his successor as president. During F.M. Smith's presidency, the church officially moved its headquarters to Independence, Missouri. F.M. Smith's bold vision for the growing church included the construction of a massive World Headquarters building, known as the Auditorium. F.M. Smith also attempted to impose a greater degree of centralization on the church's administration by issuing the controversial doctrine of supreme directional control, which led some members to leave the church and join the Church of Christ (Temple Lot).

F.M. Smith devoted much energy to the "cause of Zion", calling for a "bureau of research and service" to effect the gathering of RLDS Church members to the Kansas City area, as well as to conceptualize and implement an "order of economic development." F.M. Smith and several presiding bishops that served during his administration advocated the development of cooperative employee-owned enterprises as a key part of the RLDS Church's economic development strategy for the Centerplace. Advocacy of F.M. Smith's positions on "zionic development" continued after his death in 1946. Raymond Zinser, James Christenson and Wilford Winholtz of Harvest Hills, an RLDS cooperative community, were notable among RLDS advocates of zionic development of a cooperative social economy for the Kansas City region.

After F.M. Smith's death in 1946, he was succeeded by his brother Israel A. Smith, who presided over an optimistic era of post-war growth.

== Presidencies of W. Wallace Smith and Wallace B. Smith ==
After I.A. Smith's unexpected death in an automobile accident in 1958, he was succeeded by his brother W. Wallace Smith, the third son of Smith III to become the church's Prophet-President. Soon after coming into office, W.W. Smith appointed Graceland College professor Roy Cheville to be Presiding Patriarch of the church. The office had previously been held within the Smith family according to a principle of lineal succession.

Prior to 1960, much of the church's identity had been tied to its differences with the LDS Church. W.W. Smith traveled around the world on a missionary tour in 1960, an event that is seen as having greatly impacted the church. The church's proselytizing with other world cultures in countries outside North America forced a re-assessment and a gradual evolution of its denominational practices and beliefs. The church expanded internationally during the presidency of W.W. Smith, especially in Africa and Asia. Apostle Charles Neff, a leading church missionary, pushed fellow leaders and field ministers towards tolerance, motivated by a combination of pragmatic missionary concerns and an attitude of theological openness. These moves of the RLDS Church towards alignment with liberal Protestant doctrine were influenced in part by those in church leadership who pursued theological study at St. Paul School of Theology in Kansas City, Missouri. They were also influenced by Roy Cheville, an educator and theologian whose efforts helped lay the foundation for an era of change.

In 1976, W.W. Smith designated his son Wallace B. Smith as his successor. Wallace B. Smith assumed the presidency in 1978 after a two-year transition period. W.W. Smith then retired and became the church's first "president emeritus" until his death in 1989. W.B. Smith introduced a program of church growth called "Faith to Grow". This program identified seven commissions to be implemented in most congregations (leadership, stewardship, worship, Christian education, pastoral care, zionic relations, and missionary work). He also continued the progressive trend in the church and first suggested the change in its name to "Community of Christ".

In 1984, W.B. Smith presented a document which would become Section 156 of the Doctrine and Covenants, which called on the church to open priesthood ordination to women. The document also called upon the church to build a temple, dedicated to "peace, reconciliation and healing of the spirit" in Independence. When the temple was completed and dedicated on April 17, 1994, the headquarters of the church was transferred from the Auditorium building to the temple. Both buildings are on portions of the original Independence Temple Lot.

Former church historian Richard P. Howard commented that this period resulted in some "disaffection" and "led to intense conflict in scattered areas of the RLDS Church". This resulted in a schism which led to the formation of the Restoration Branches movement and other churches such as the Remnant Church of Jesus Christ of Latter Day Saints and the Church of the Lamb of God.

== Presidency of W. Grant McMurray ==
Although the previous pattern had been a lineal succession to the presidency through the Smith patriarchal line, W.B. Smith designated W. Grant McMurray as his successor. McMurray had served in the church's historical department from 1973 until his call as Church Secretary in 1982. McMurray became the church's president in 1996 and W.B. Smith became president emeritus.

In 1997, McMurray launched the RLDS Church into a three-year formal period of transformation entitled "Transformation 2000", which he described as the culmination of a series of changes dating back to 1960. McMurray identified these changes as a movement away from a belief that the denomination was "the restored church" and towards an admittedly unique position in mainstream Christianity.

As the first president of the RLDS Church who was not a direct descendant of Joseph Smith, McMurray sought to formalize changes in thinking about prophetic leadership, the historical basis of the Book of Mormon, and the concept that priesthood authority had been restored in the 1830s after centuries of apostasy. During his presidency, the church moved from closed communion to open communion, and McMurray began to open the door to priesthood ordination for non-celibate gay people, something which he acknowledged was occurring anyway. A backlash on this issue forced McMurray to reaffirm the official policy of the Standing High Council, which prohibited the ordination of sexually active gays and lesbians. However, the church allowed those who were ordained to continue in priesthood office. In 1998, Gail E. Mengel and Linda L. Booth became the first two women apostles in the church.

At a World Conference in 2000, the church overwhelmingly approved McMurray's proposal to change its name to Community of Christ, which was stated to more clearly define the purpose of the church. The change officially occurred on April 6, 2001. The church retained ownership of the name "Reorganized Church of Jesus Christ of Latter Day Saints" for legal and historical purposes. Also during McMurray's presidency, Community of Christ launched the Community of Christ Seminary, which focuses on practical Christian ministries taught from a progressive Christian theological viewpoint.

On November 29, 2004, McMurray resigned as president, stating that he had made "inappropriate choices" and under the circumstances it would not be appropriate for him to designate a successor. The details of the reasons for his decision were said to be personal and the governing bodies of the church determined to keep them confidential. A spokesperson for the church said that the resignation was not for misappropriation of church funds or other church-related issues, but of a personal nature. Also, McMurray was diagnosed with Parkinson's disease. The two remaining members of the First Presidency, Kenneth N. Robinson and Peter A. Judd, continued to function in their council's leadership role.

== Presidency of Stephen M. Veazey ==
Robinson and Judd announced that the Council of Twelve Apostles, in conjunction with the church's other leadership quorums, would prayerfully consider who should succeed McMurray. On March 7, 2005, the Twelve announced their conviction that Stephen M. Veazey was called by God to be the next prophet-president of Community of Christ. A special World Conference that was convened in June 2005 sustained this call of Veazey to be president of the high priesthood, prophet, and president of the church. On June 3, 2005, he was ordained to this office and submitted a letter of council to the church regarding the leading quorums, orders, and councils of the church.

On June 4, 2005, Robinson and David D. Schaal were ordained as counselors to the President in the church's Community of Christ.

Veazey's first conference sermon as President called upon members of the church to be active disciples and to share the fullness of the peace of Christ. He encouraged members to embrace their differences and to call each other, no matter how different in theological and moral views and understandings, sisters and brothers in Christ. Veazey's background as a career missionary and as a field minister for the church is unique when compared to that of previous presidents of the denomination. One of Veazey's first challenges was the need to assess the sustainability of deficit budgets adopted at previous World Conferences. On June 14, 2006, the church announced a new staff organizational structure designed to reduce costs and better align the World Church staff with the priorities and mission of the church. Approximately one-fourth of the headquarters and field staff positions were eliminated.

Veazey presided over the 2007 World Conference, where his words of counsel to the church were presented and approved as Section 163 of the Doctrine and Covenants. The document covered a broad range of topics, including the identity of the church as "Community of Christ"; the divine invitation to "receive divine peace;" the call to challenge political, cultural and religious trends that are contrary to peace; the social gospel; the environmental gospel; the misuse of Scripture; spiritual formation; the disciples' generous response; and the call to be a prophetic people. In addition, Veazey took steps to team members of the Council of Twelve with a member of the Seventy in each mission field. He presented the call of Becky L. Savage to replace the retiring Robinson as a member of the First Presidency. Veazey celebrated Savage as the first woman to serve in that office and recognized it as "another step in the long journey toward equal regard and opportunity in the church and in society."

== Presidency of Stassi D. Cramm ==
Stassi D. Cramm was sustained as Prophet-President on June 1, 2025, during World Conference.

== History of affiliated organizations ==
=== Schools ===
The church established Graceland College (now Graceland University) in Lamoni, Iowa during 1895.

=== Healthcare ===
In December 1909, the church opened Independence Sanitarium (known colloquially as 'the San'), which provided sanatorium and hospital services to the local community. The hospital's name was changed to Independence Regional Health Center in 1986, at the time housing 337 beds with 1,100 employees. The church sold the hospital to Columbia Hospital Corporation in January 1994 for $36 million (equivalent to $78,199,371 in 2025), with much of the proceeds going towards the new temple. The hospital was ultimately closed in 2007, following the completion of Centerpoint Medical Center.

The church also operated a retirement home known as Resthaven, which was located near the hospital. Opened in 1956, it was later known as The Groves, before being sold by the church in 2010.
