= Comparison of the Community of Christ and the LDS Church =

Community of Christ (left) and LDS Church (right USVA gravestone symbol

Community of Christ—formerly the Reorganized Church of Jesus Christ of Latter Day Saints (RLDS Church)—and the Church of Jesus Christ of Latter-day Saints (LDS Church) are two denominations that share a common heritage in the Church of Christ founded by Joseph Smith on April 6, 1830. Since Smith's death in 1844, they have evolved separately in belief and practices. The Church of Jesus Christ of Latter Day Saints is headquartered in Salt Lake City, Utah, and claims more than 17 million members worldwide; Community of Christ is headquartered in Independence, Missouri, and reports a worldwide membership of approximately 250,000.

== Community of Christ transformation since 1960 ==
Significant doctrinal, organizational, and attitudinal changes in Community of Christ since 1960 have narrowed the similarities that remain between it and the LDS Church. While the doctrine and belief system of the LDS Church is highly centralized, systematic, and static, Community of Christ has adopted an adaptive, decentralized, and progressive approach to doctrine. In 1997, Community of Christ initiated a three-year period of transformation entitled “Transformation 2000", that was seen by its president W. Grant McMurray as the culmination of a series of changes dating back to 1960. McMurray identified these changes as a movement away from a belief that the denomination was "the restored church" and towards a position within mainstream Christianity. At the World Conference of 2000, by vote of 1,979 to 561, the name of the church was changed from the Reorganized Church of Jesus Christ of Latter Day Saints to Community of Christ. In so doing, the church was attempting to distance itself from comparisons with the LDS Church and in the process transform itself into a unique body among mainstream Christian denominations.

McMurray was the first president of Community of Christ who was not a direct descendant of Joseph Smith. He sought to formalize developments in thinking about prophetic leadership, the historical basis of the Book of Mormon, and the concept that priesthood authority had been restored in the 1820s and 1830s after centuries of apostasy. During his presidency, the church moved from a closed to an open communion and McMurray began to open the door to priesthood ordination for LGBT individuals, something which he acknowledged was already occurring. At the time, negative membership response to this issue forced McMurray to reaffirm the official policy prohibiting the ordination of sexually active gays and lesbians. The church allowed those who were ordained against policy to continue in their priesthood offices. Since 2010, gay rights have been formalized in Community of Christ doctrine.

Prior to 1960, the RLDS Church's identity was primarily tied to its differences with the larger LDS Church, which RLDS Church members usually referred to as the "Utah Church" or "Mormon Church". McMurray cited a 1960 world tour by former president W. Wallace Smith as a pivotal event impacting the evolution of RLDS Church beliefs. Leaders such as Roy Cheville had already been teaching a new generation of church members a more ecumenical and open-minded system of beliefs. But it was the church's proselytizing of cultures in countries outside North America that knew little about Christianity, much less Mormonism, that forced a reassessment of denominational practices and beliefs. RLDS apostle Charles Neff, a leading church missionary, pushed fellow leaders and field ministers towards a relativistic doctrinal viewpoint motivated by a combination of practical missionary concerns and an attitude of theological openness. These significant moves of Community of Christ towards alignment with liberal Protestant doctrine were influenced in part by many in church leadership who pursued theological studies at St. Paul School of Theology in Kansas City, Missouri. While the RLDS Church had long been known for its strong anti-polygamy stance, its outreach efforts amongst the Sora people in India brought a re-examination even on this issue.

Church president Wallace B. Smith's 1984 call for the ordination of women to the priesthood was a milestone in the doctrinal evolution of the church towards progressive Christianity. During his term in office, greater attention was brought to peace and justice issues. The call to dedicate the Independence Temple to the "pursuit of peace" is widely regarded as both symbolic and practical evidence of the differences between the two denominations. While the LDS Church has a set of highly standardized temple rituals and regards temples as sacred space for the creation of covenants, Community of Christ understands temples to be a less formalized center for spirituality, ministerial education, and church administration.

These changes are often viewed as a broad shift in theology of Community of Christ from Restorationism to mainline Protestant Christianity, widening the scope of long-standing doctrinal differences between it and the LDS Church. However, rejection by the RLDS of certain LDS theological distinctives such as exaltation long predates these changes. Nearly all of the traditional differences between the two groups can be seen as aligning Community of Christ more closely with traditional Christian teaching and neo-orthodoxy.

== Historical differences between the churches ==
The RLDS Church was founded by the confederation of a number of smaller groups that declined to migrate with Brigham Young to Utah Territory or follow any of the others vying to become the successor to Joseph Smith. Prior to the 1860 Amboy Conference, in which the church was formally "reorganized" into the RLDS Church, numerous doctrinal differences were espoused by the leaders of the various splinter groups. Following the reorganization, these differences were solidified into a litany of what might now be called "wedge issues" that would distinguish it from Young's LDS Church in Utah.

The differences enumerated below characterize the major differences between Community of Christ and the LDS Church.

=== Scriptures ===
Both churches believe in an open canon of scripture founded upon the Bible, the Book of Mormon, and revelations of God to the church recorded in the Doctrine and Covenants.

==== Bible ====
The Inspired Version of the Bible is part of Community of Christ's canon of scripture, although it does not mandate a single translation of the Bible. Herald Publishing House, Community of Christ's publishing arm, sells both the Inspired Version and the NRSV. The NRSV is considered a "good, recent translation", and tends to be regarded as the "default" bible in the present Community of Christ due to "its excellent scholarship" and its "interpretive principle of inclusion", although other translations are preferred in different areas.

More recently, Community of Christ has adopted the New Revised Standard Version Updated Edition (NRSVue) for use in English-language resources. Noting the dependence of the Inspired Version on the King James Version, the basis of the King James Version on a relatively small number of relatively late source manuscripts, and the lack of support for Joseph Smith's changes in older Biblical manuscripts which have since been discovered, Community of Christ theology and scripture consultants Charmaine and Tony Chvala-Smith suggest understanding the Inspired Version as a work of theological commentary by Joseph Smith rather than as a restoration of the original autograph texts.

The LDS Church initially viewed the RLDS-published Inspired Version with suspicion, and favoured the Authorized King James Version (KJV) over it, although this suspicion "rapidly faded" during the 1970s. Following polemics by J. Reuben Clark of the First Presidency in favour of the KJV and the Greek Textus Receptus, and in opposition to the RV, ASV and RSV and the Greek Westcott–Hort text (using the KJV basis of the Inspired Version as one of the arguments in favour of the KJV), the KJV has been firmly established as the approved English-language bible of the LDS Church, cemented upon the LDS Church publishing its own edition of the KJV in 1979. The LDS Church edition of the KJV includes curated excerpts from the Inspired Version, which the LDS Church refers to as the "Joseph Smith Translation of the Bible" (JST), in footnotes and an appendix.

For Spanish-speaking members, the LDS Church publishes a slightly modified version of the Reina-Valera version, including footnotes and annotations comparable to those found in its official King James Version. For other languages, the LDS Church recommends usage of specific traditional translations that are selected based on doctrinal integrity with the other official standard works.

==== Book of Mormon ====
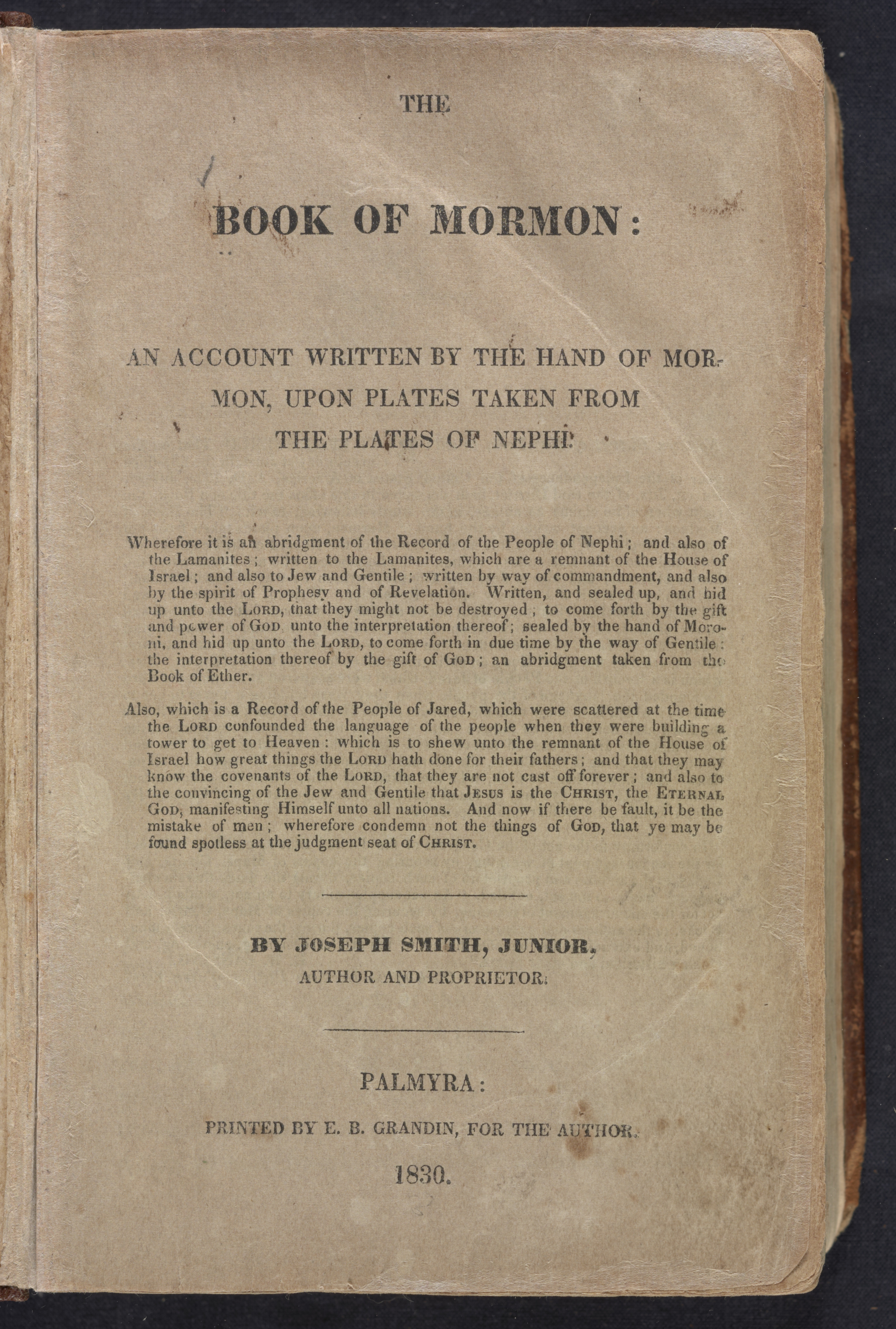
Title page of the first edition of the Book of Mormon (1830).

Both Community of Christ and LDS Church accept the Book of Mormon as a second canon of scripture and views it as an additional witness of Jesus Christ that complements the Bible. Community of Christ publishes two versions of the book through its official publishing arm, Herald House. The Authorized Edition is based on the original printer's manuscript and the 1837 Second Edition (or "Kirtland Edition") of the Book of Mormon. Its content is similar to the Book of Mormon published by the LDS Church. Community of Christ also publishes a 1966 "Revised Authorized Edition", which attempts to modernize some of the language. In both cases, the versification is different from the LDS edition: for example, LDS 3 Nephi 11:7 corresponds to CofC III Nephi 5:8.

The LDS Church publishes a single version of the Book of Mormon, which is extensively footnoted to the church's other standard works. Its chapter and versification is based upon the 1879 edition edited by Orson Pratt.

At a 2007 World Conference, Community of Christ President Stephen M. Veazey ruled that a resolution to "reaffirm the Book of Mormon as a divinely inspired record" was out of order. He stated that "while the Church affirms the Book of Mormon as scripture, and makes it available for study and use in various languages, we do not attempt to mandate the degree of belief or use. This position is in keeping with our longstanding tradition that belief in the Book of Mormon is not to be used as a test of fellowship or membership in the church." Although it remains an official book of scripture, views among Community of Christ members regarding its use and historicity span the entire spectrum. The LDS Church regularly emphasizes the importance of the Book of Mormon and encourages its members to read from it daily.

==== Doctrine and Covenants ====
Both churches publish a book called the Doctrine and Covenants and accept it as scripture. Community of Christ has removed several early sections and has regularly added new revelations and other inspired documents to the book since the death of Joseph Smith. The LDS Church removed what was Section 101 (the declaration on marriage which prohibited polygamy) in the 1835 edition of the Doctrine and Covenants and added the revelation on plural marriage. The LDS Church has added some material to the Doctrine and Covenants since Smith's death, but less than that of Community of Christ. The Community of Christ version currently contains 166 documents, 51 of which were produced after the death of Joseph Smith. The LDS Church version currently contains 140 documents, five of which were produced after Smith's death.

==== Pearl of Great Price ====
The LDS Church includes the Pearl of Great Price as part of its standard works. Community of Christ has never published or considered this book to be scripture. However, Community of Christ does accept two portions of the Pearl of Great Price—the Book of Moses and Joseph Smith–Matthew—as scripture:

- Chapters 2–8 of the Book of Moses are included within the Book of Genesis in Community of Christ's Inspired Version of the Bible;
- Chapter 1 of the Book of Moses is accepted as section 22 of Community of Christ's Doctrine and Covenants;
- In addition to appearing in the Inspired Version of the Bible, chapter 7 of the Book of Moses is accepted as section 36 of Community of Christ's Doctrine and Covenants; and
- Joseph Smith–Matthew is accepted as part of the Book of Matthew in the Inspired Version of the Bible.

As presently published by the LDS Church, the Pearl of Great Price also includes the Book of Abraham, Joseph Smith–History, and the Articles of Faith; these are not accepted as scripture by Community of Christ. The original edition of the Pearl of Great Price was published in 1851 in England by Franklin D. Richards, and included several other documents:

- "A Key to the Revelations of St. John", detailing interpretations of the Apocalypse of John in question-and-answer format. This was later added to the LDS Doctrine and Covenants in 1876, and appears as D&C 77 in the current LDS canon; it does not appear in the Community of Christ canon.
- "A Revelation and Prophecy by the Prophet, Seer, and Revelator, Joseph Smith", foretelling of a civil war between slave states and free states and ensuing escalation to a world war, and admonishing the faithful to "stand ye in holy places, and be not moved" until the second coming. This was later added to the LDS Doctrine and Covenants in 1876, and appears as D&C 87 in the current LDS canon; it does not appear in the Community of Christ canon.
- Several excerpts of documents that already appeared in the Doctrine and Covenants prior to Joseph Smith's death:
  - "From the Doctrine and Covenants of the Church", comprising several excerpts from LDS D&C 20 / CofC D&C 17 and LDS D&C 107 / CofC D&C 104.
  - "Extract from a Revelation given July, 1830", also excerpted from the Doctrine and Covenants (part of LDS D&C 27 or CofC D&C 26)
  - "Rise of The Church of Jesus Christ of Latter-day Saints", also excerpted from the Doctrine and Covenants (the start of LDS D&C 20 or CofC D&C 17)
- "Truth", the hymn "O, Say What is Truth?". This is canonised by neither church, although it appears in the LDS Church hymnbook.

In 1976, documents titled "Vision of the Celestial Kingdom" (an excerpt from volume 2 of the Documentary History of the Church, detailing Joseph Smith's vision of Alvin Smith in the Celestial Kingdom) and "Vision of the Redemption of the Dead" (a vision of the harrowing of the Spirit Prison recorded by Joseph F. Smith in 1918) were added to the Pearl of Great Price by the LDS Church. In 1979, they were moved to the LDS Doctrine and Covenants as D&C 137 and 138. They have never been canonised by Community of Christ.

=== Presidential tenure and succession ===
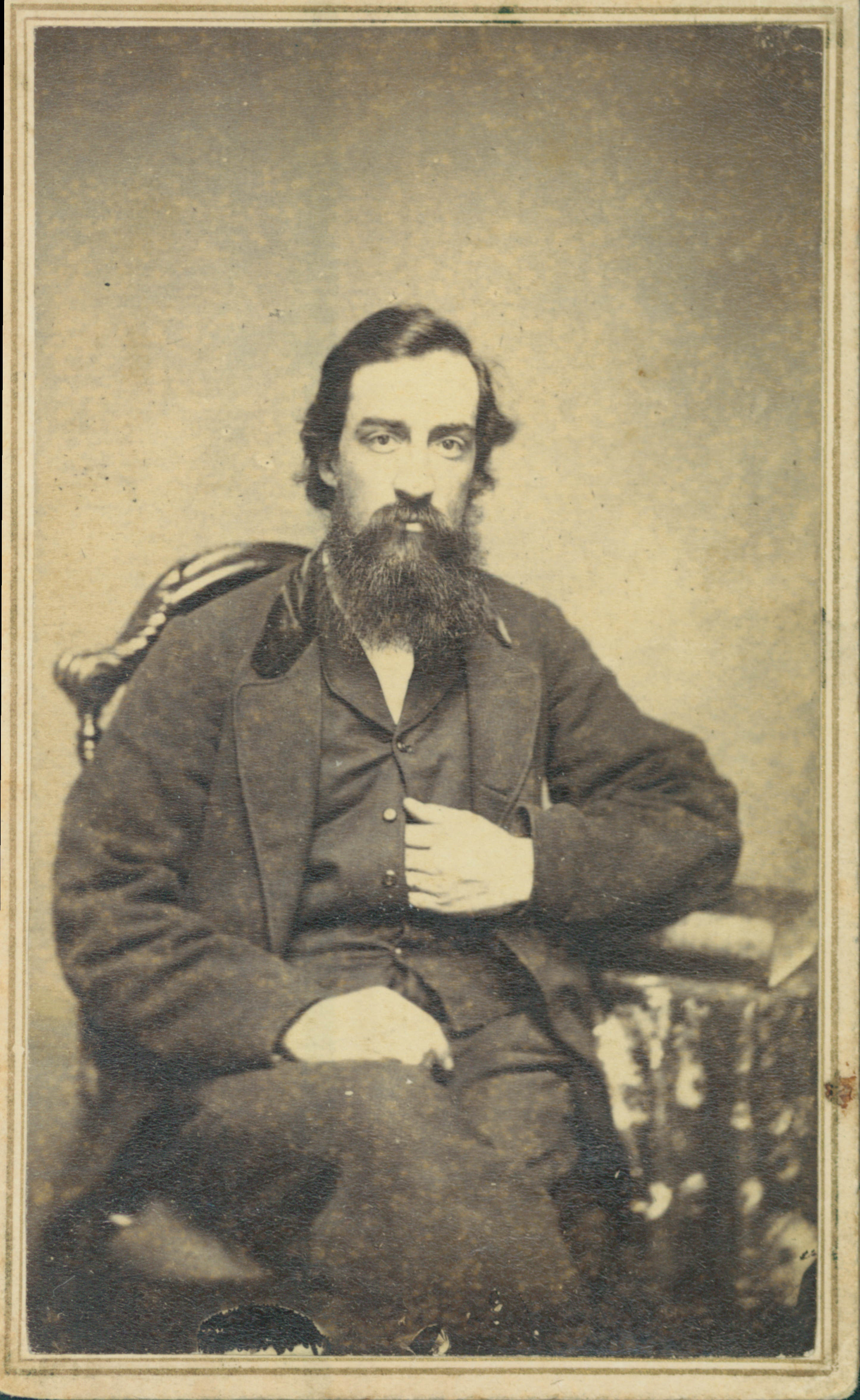
Joseph Smith III, the successor to Joseph Smith as the Prophet-President of Community of Christ

Both Community of Christ and the LDS Church are headed by a President of the Church, a position created and held by Joseph Smith. In the LDS Church, succession to the presidency has been based on apostolic seniority. In Community of Christ, the president has the power to appoint a successor; if the outgoing president does not appoint a successor, the Council of Twelve Apostles nominates a successor.

After Smith, the next three presidents of Community of Christ served as President of the Church until their deaths. In 1978, W. Wallace Smith broke this tradition and retired from the presidency, designated himself as "president emeritus", and appointed Wallace B. Smith as his successor. Wallace B. Smith and his chosen successor—McMurray—also retired from the position. In the LDS Church, every President of the Church has served until his death and none have selected a successor prior to death.

The first five successors to Joseph Smith in the presidency of Community of Christ were direct descendants of Smith. McMurray was the first president of the church who was not a member of the Smith family. While never formally accepting a principle of lineal succession, the denomination teaches that Smith had designated his son, Joseph Smith III, as his successor. In 1996, the appointment of McMurray by retiring president Wallace B. Smith was the justification used by schismatic groups that abandoned Community of Christ. This schism led to the creation of the Remnant Church of Jesus Christ of Latter Day Saints. The president of the Remnant Church at the time, Frederick Niels Larsen, was a maternal great-great-grandson of Joseph Smith. Larsen's handpicked successor and current head of the Remnant Church, Terry W. Patience, however, is not a descendant of Joseph Smith.

The LDS Church determines its presidential successor by principles of apostolic seniority combined with inspiration from God. When a church president dies, the member of the Quorum of the Twelve Apostles who has been an apostle the longest—the President of the Quorum of the Twelve Apostles—becomes the new president of the church. Prior to making the succession official, the apostles individually and collectively pray for divine guidance and confirmation of their proposed action.

While this is an area that marked a traditional difference between the two denominations, a 2004–05 succession crisis prompted the Council of Twelve Apostles of Community of Christ to utilize an inspiration-seeking procedure similar to that adopted by the apostles of the LDS Church. When McMurray stepped down as president in 2004, he chose not to name a successor, as previous retirees from the position had done. In 2005, Stephen M. Veazey—who was president of the Twelve, but not the senior member—was selected as successor by the Council of Twelve.

=== Godhead ===
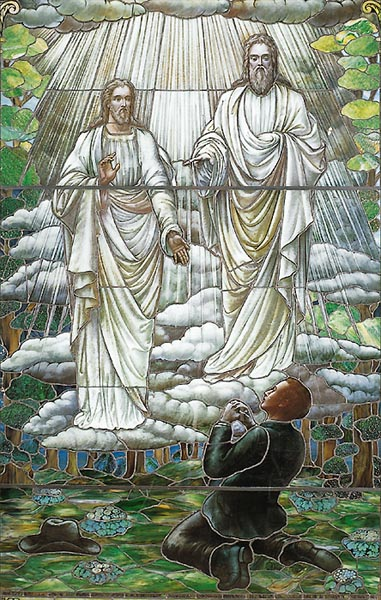
Stained glass depiction of the first vision of Joseph Smith, completed in 1913 by an unknown artist (LDS Museum of Church History and Art).

Community of Christ teaches about the Trinity, which they define as a God who is a community of three persons. The LDS Church teaches that the Godhead is composed of three physically distinct personages who are united—or "one"—in purpose.

==== Exaltation ====
The LDS Church teaches the principle of exaltation, in which people who achieve the highest degree of salvation can become Gods, and in which God the Father was once a man who became an exalted person. This teaching is derived from late-Nauvoo-period statements of Joseph Smith such as the King Follett Discourse.

This doctrine is not accepted by Community of Christ, which already regarded it as false doctrine as of the tenure of Elbert A. Smith as presiding patriarch of the RLDS Church (1938–1958). Smith, in a pamphlet titled Differences That Persist, argued that the exaltation teaching contradicted statements in the Bible, Book of Mormon and Doctrine and Covenants emphasising the unchanging nature of God. This position was established long before the controversies which led to the separation of the Restoration branches in the 1980s; hence, the exaltation teaching is also rejected by that group. (Note: Tandy, Jon. "Differences between the RLDS and LDS Doctrine and Covenants on the subject of Godhood". CenterPlace.org. (Notes: CenterPlace.org is a Restoration Branches website. The specific difference between LDS D&C 121 and Times and Seasons highlighted by the linked article is an instance of the Times and Seasons text being redacted; the clauses are present in the original manuscript.))

==== Adam–God doctrine ====
According to Brigham Young, the Adam–God doctrine was first taught by Joseph Smith before his death in 1844. However, the evidence that Smith originated the doctrine consists only of Young's own assertions, (Note: (citing minutes of meeting of the Quorum of Twelve, 4 April 1860, in which it was recorded: "It was Joseph's doctrine that Adam was God… God comes to earth and eats and partakes of fruit. Joseph could not reveal what was revealed to him, and if Joseph had it revealed, he was not told to reveal it."). (citing Wilford Woodruff Journal of September 4, 1860, in which George Q. Cannon said "that Adam is our Father [and] is a true doctrine revealed from God to Joseph & Brigham. For this same doctrine is taught in some of the old Jewish records which have never been in print...."). (citing Wilford Woodruff Journal of December 16, 1867, stating that "President Young said Adam was Michael the Archangel, & he was the Father of Jesus Christ & was our God & that Joseph taught this principle.")) an 1877 recollection of Anson Call, (Note: (citing an 1877 reminiscence of Anson Call, who said he heard Joseph Smith say: "now regarding Adam: He came here from another planet [as] an immortalized being and brought his wife, Eve, with him, and by eating of the fruits of the earth became subject to death and decay and he became of the earth, earthly, was made mortal and subject to death.").) and some circumstantial evidence collected by Mormon fundamentalist writers. (Note: See, e.g., (a fundamentalist author, arguing that Joseph Smith believed and taught the doctrine).) LDS Church President Spencer W. Kimball officially denounced the Adam–God doctrine in 1976.

Because Community of Christ was founded by the confederation of a number of smaller groups that declined to accept Young's leadership, the Adam–God doctrine has never been a part of Community of Christ teachings, and it has maintained that the doctrine was first enunciated by Young, not Smith.

=== Priesthood eligibility ===
Both churches have a tradition of bestowing the priesthood on adult male members of the church. The priesthood of Community of Christ has always been open to persons of all races in accordance with section 116 of the Community of Christ Doctrine and Covenants, received in 1865 and canonised in 1878; it was opened to women in 1984. The LDS Church's priesthood is open to males only and from the mid-1800s until 1978 was not open to people of Black African descent. The LDS Church routinely gives its Aaronic priesthood to boys 11 years of age and older, while Community of Christ generally restricts its priesthood to adult men and women.

=== Temples ===
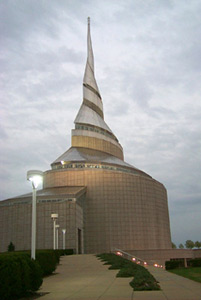
Independence Temple of Community of Christ in Independence, Missouri.

Both Community of Christ and the LDS Church operate temples, which for both groups are separate and distinct from church chapels or meetinghouses. The LDS Church has 202 (Note: The LDS Church has 385 temples in various phases, which includes 227 dedicated temples (221 operating, 6 undergoing renovations), 6 with dedications scheduled, 59 under construction, 5 with groundbreaking ceremonies scheduled, and 86 others announced (not yet under construction).) operating temples. Until 2024, Community of Christ operated two temples, the Kirtland Temple and the Independence Temple. On March 5, 2024, the Kirtland Temple was acquired by the LDS Church.

In contrast to Brigham Young's position that a specific commandment was not needed before the Salt Lake Temple was built, Community of Christ traditionally maintains that a specific commandment is required before erecting a temple, noting the existence of such separate commandments for the Kirtland, Nauvoo and original planned Independence temples, and citing Joseph Smith having halted temple construction in Far West, Missouri on the basis of the absence of a commandment revealing it to be the will of God. As such, the commandment to construct the present Independence Temple is included in section 149 of the Community of Christ edition of the Doctrine and Covenants, and further instructions regarding its construction and purpose are included in later sections.

Community of Christ does not practice and has traditionally objected to the idea of sacraments or rituals being performed in its temples; half of the eight sacraments (baptism, confirmation, blessing of children, marriage) are not performed in Community of Christ temples (although, for example, the Lord's Supper and anointing of the sick are), and neither has a baptismal font. Community of Christ's temples are open to the public and are dedicated to the pursuit of peace, spiritual learning, and church history and administration. LDS Church temples are open only to approved members and are primarily used for the performance of rites such as the endowment, celestial marriage, and baptism for the dead; these ordinances have never been embraced by Community of Christ.

Historically, Community of Christ did include documents in its Doctrine and Covenants which sanctioned baptism for the dead and other temple rites. However, Community of Christ considers that the institution of baptism for the dead was made conditional on the completion of the Nauvoo Temple in a reasonable amount of time. Because the membership of the church failed to complete the temple during Smith's lifetime, Community of Christ teaches that the right to perform baptisms for the dead was withdrawn and has not been reinstituted.

The 1970 World Conference of the Community of Christ concluded that sections 107, 109, and 110 (regarding baptism for the dead and temple rites) had been added to the 1844 edition of the Doctrine and Covenants without proper approval of a church conference. Thus, the conference redesignated those sections as historical appendices. The World Conference of 1990 subsequently removed the entire appendix from the Doctrine and Covenants.

=== Use of cross and other symbols ===
Community of Christ utilizes the symbol of the Christian cross on its buildings and temples. The LDS Church currently does not use the cross on the grounds that "because the Savior lives, we do not use the symbol of His death as the symbol of our faith", although this aversion to the cross only became dominant in the 20th century. Rather than a cross, the logo of the LDS Church features the Christus statue as a symbol.

Many temples of the LDS Church include a statue of the Angel Moroni on a spire, but the church does not consider Moroni to be an official symbol and "has no policy regarding the use of statues of the angel Moroni atop temples", but rather includes or excludes a statue from each temple based on local circumstances. Community of Christ does not use the Angel Moroni as a symbol.

In the United States, the Veterans Affairs (VA) emblem for headstones for LDS Church members is a stylized Angel Moroni. For Community of Christ members, the VA emblem is a stylized representation of a child standing between a lion and a lamb, which is an official logo of Community of Christ.

=== Polygamy ===
In the 19th century, the differences between the LDS Church and the RLDS Church regarding polygamy was the principal distinction between the two churches. The LDS Church openly practiced plural marriage from 1852 to 1890 and taught that the practice was instituted by Joseph Smith and taught in secret to members of the church before his death. For many years, the leaders of the RLDS Church were vocal critics of the LDS Church's polygamy and argued that the practice had been introduced by Brigham Young, and falsely attributed to Smith after Smith's death. Polygamy was frequently denounced by RLDS leaders and the practice was never accepted by the church. Smith's son Joseph Smith III and widow Emma Smith repeatedly taught that Smith opposed the practice and was not a polygamist.

Today, the Community of Christ continues to reject polygamy. The LDS Church opposes the practice of polygamy in this life, and its church presidents have repeatedly emphasized that the Church and its members are no longer authorized to enter into plural marriage. (Note: However, a divorced or widowered LDS man can be sealed in the temple to later wives upon remarriage, all of whom he would be married to in the celestial kingdom, while a woman can only be sealed to one husband at a time while both are alive; this has come under criticism as "polygamy delayed" to the hereafter. Community of Christ does not practice temple sealing.)

=== Tithing ===
Traditionally, Community of Christ taught that tithing should be calculated as one-tenth of a member's discretionary income. The LDS Church teaches that it is ten percent of one's annual income, with it left to the member to determine how to calculate it (e.g., what constitutes "income" and whether it is ten percent of income after or before tax). Recently, Community of Christ has adopted a program known as Disciples' Generous Response, which encourages financial generosity as a response to God rather than as a set calculated obligation.

=== Apostasy and restoration ===
The LDS Church teaches that Joseph Smith restored the fullness of the gospel after a centuries long period known as the Great Apostasy. The LDS Church therefore characterizes itself as a restoration of fallen Christianity and the one true church that exists. In contrast, Community of Christ has de-emphasized its traditional tenet that it is the one true church and has adopted a viewpoint that all faith traditions can offer a pathway to divine illumination. Barbara McFarlane Higdon has called Community of Christ a "unique member of the body of Christ, the universal community of believers." Higdon also suggests that prior claims that the church had been "restored" were tantamount to idolatry. Community of Christ has therefore moved towards ecumenism and inter-faith dialogue. Nevertheless, Community of Christ "steadfastly affirms the primacy of continuing revelation instead of creedal rigidity". Community of Christ's Doctrine and Covenants continues to contain documents that declare that the church is the one true church.

Today, Community of Christ generally refers to Joseph Smith's First Vision as the "grove experience" and takes a flexible view about its historicity, emphasizing the healing presence of God and the forgiving mercy of Jesus Christ felt by Smith. In contrast to the LDS Church having canonised the 1838 account of the First Vision, orientation movies at Community of Christ operated historic sites tend to either derive from the earlier 1832 account, or else use vague language. In contrast, the LDS Church strongly affirms the reality of the First Vision and emphasizes its role as the beginning of the restoration of the gospel through God's chosen prophet.

== Summary chart ==
		Community of Christ	LDS Church
Approximate membership		250,000	17,002,461
Headquarters		Independence, Missouri	Salt Lake City, Utah
Open canon		Yes	Yes
Bible		Inspired Version published in its entirety, though other versions (especially NRSV) are also used	King James Version in LDS edition or other language-appropriate edition; Inspired Version is respected but not canonized, with selected excerpts included in published bibles
Book of Mormon	Canonicity	Accepts as scripture.	Accepts as scripture.
Book of Mormon	Versification	Versification keeps original chapters, e.g. "Adam fell, that men might be; and men are, that they might have joy." is 2 Nephi 1:115.	Versification splits original chapters, e.g. "Adam fell that men might be; and men are, that they might have joy." is 2 Nephi 2:25.
Doctrine and Covenants	Documents	166 documents	140 documents
Doctrine and Covenants	Lectures of Faith	Decanonised	Decanonised
Doctrine and Covenants	Post-Joseph Smith documents	51 (114 onwards)	Five (135, 136, 138, OD1, OD2)
Doctrine and Covenants	Last expanded	2016	1979
Pearl of Great Price	Published as a canonical work	No	Yes
Pearl of Great Price	Canonical parts	Inspired Version Genesis 1:1–8:18 (Moses 2–8); Inspired Version Matthew 23:39–24:56 (Joseph Smith–Matthew); D&C 22 (Moses 1) and D&C 36 (Moses 7)	Book of Moses, Book of Abraham, Joseph Smith–Matthew, Joseph Smith–History, Articles of Faith Moved to Doctrine and Covenants: Key to the Revelation of John, (Note: In 1851 edition as "A key to the revelations of St. John"; became D&C 77 in 1876) Civil War prophecy, (Note: In 1851 edition as "A revelation and prophecy by the prophet, seer, and revelator, Joseph Smith"; became D&C 87 in 1876) Vision of the Celestial Kingdom, (Note: Added 1976 as "Vision of the Celestial Kingdom"; became D&C 137 in 1979) Vision of the Redemption of the Dead (Note: Added 1976 as "Vision of the Redemption of the Dead"; became D&C 138 in 1979)
Pearl of Great Price	Parts not canonised	Book of Abraham, Joseph Smith–History, Articles/Epitome of Faith, Key to the Revelation of John, Civil War prophecy, Vision of the Celestial Kingdom, Vision of the Redemption of the Dead, O Say What is Truth	O Say What is Truth (Note: In 1851 edition, later removed) (not canonical; included in hymnbook)
Church president	Tenure	Prophet-President may choose to retire and may appoint successor	President serves in position until death and does not appoint a successor before death
Church president	Succession	Succession traditionally based on lineal descent from Joseph Smith; now abandoned in favor of appointment by retiring president or apostolic selection by inspiration	Succession based on apostolic seniority combined with apostolic selection by inspiration
Theology	Model of Godhead	"God who is a community of three persons"	Three distinct personages of God united in purpose
Theology	Position on Trinity	Identifies as trinitarian	Identifies as nontrinitarian
Theology	Exaltation	Rejects; God is unchanging and has always been God, a view seen as supported by the Book of Mormon.	Accepts; "as man is, God once was"; King Follett discourse respected (although not canonised).
Theology	Adam–God doctrine	Rejects	Initially many general authorities accepted, others rejected; by 1902 no longer publicly taught; currently rejects due to never being formally adopted
Polygamy		Rejects both polygamy and sealing	Polygamy in the early days of the Church recognized. Marriage to multiple living wives not practised or authorized since 1904. Sealing of a widow/widower to another husband/wife without cancelling the first sealing remains practised.
Priesthood	Ethnic eligibility	Open to all races; affirmed in Doctrine and Covenants (section 116) since 1878	Open to all races since 1978 (previous Black African descent prohibition)
Priesthood	Gender eligibility	Open to women since 1984	Open to men only
Priesthood	Other	Open to baptized members	Open to boys beginning the year they turn 12
Temples	Number	1	168 (Note: Kirtland Temple is open to the public under a 15-year contract between Community of Christ and LDS Church; as such, it is not an operating temple in the LDS Church sense.)
Temples	Criteria for construction	Constructed in response to canonised revelations commanding the construction of that specific temple and detailing its purpose	Constructed as required, as announced by the church president
Temples	Eligibility to enter	Open to the public	Open only to members in good standing
Temples	Purpose	Dedicated to peace, spiritual learning, and church administration and history	Dedicated to performance of standardized ordinances and covenant-making
Temples	Endowment	Rejects	Accepts
Temples	Baptism for the dead	Rejects	Accepts
Temples	Celestial marriage and family sealing	Rejects	Accepts
Cross as a symbol		Accepts	Rejects; Symbols tend to portray the Glorifed Christ (e.g. the Christus) rather than the Crucified Christ (as in the occupied cross of Catholicism) or the Resurrected Christ in terms of absence (as in the vacant cross of Protestantism).
Angel Moroni as a symbol		Rejects	Accepts, but not as an official symbol
Tithing		One-tenth of discretionary income; More flexible "Disciples' Generous Response" has been introduced	One-tenth of annual income (member decides how to calculate)
First Vision	Importance	Referred to as the "grove experience"; No position on historicity	Accepts as a foundational historical event; Smith's 1838 account is canonized as part of Joseph Smith–History
First Vision	Focus	Focus on the healing presence of God and the forgiving mercy of Jesus Christ for Joseph Smith	Focus on its role as the beginning of the restoration of the gospel through a prophet chosen by God
Is it the "one true church"?		Traditionally, yes; more recently, de-emphasized and questioned	Yes
