= JSH =

JSH may refer to:

- Book of Joshua or Book of Jsh, sixth book in the Hebrew Bible
- Joseph Smith–History, a part of the sacred texts of The Church of Jesus Christ of Latter-day Saints
- Sitia Public Airport (IATA code)
