= Joseph Smith–Matthew =

Book in the Pearl of Great Price; part of the Joseph Smith Translation of the Bible

Joseph Smith–Matthew (abbreviated JS–M) is a book in the Pearl of Great Price, a scriptural text used by the Church of Jesus Christ of Latter-day Saints (LDS Church) and other Latter Day Saint denominations. Joseph Smith–Matthew consists of Joseph Smith's "retranslation" of portions of the Gospel of Matthew. It was originally published in 1831 in Kirtland, Ohio, in an undated broadsheet as "Extract from the New Translation of the Bible".

Joseph Smith–Matthew includes Smith's retranslation of Matthew 23:39 and all of Matthew chapter 24. The translation was created by Smith in 1831. The text deals mainly with Jesus' prophecy of the coming destruction of Jerusalem and of similar calamities that will precede his Second Coming. Joseph Smith–Matthew contains significant changes and additions to the original biblical text.

Joseph Smith–Matthew and the Book of Moses (also contained in the Pearl of Great Price) are the only portions of the Joseph Smith Translation of the Bible that the LDS Church has canonized as part of its standard works. Other selections from the Joseph Smith Translation are included in the footnotes and the appendix in the LDS Church–published King James Version of the Bible, but the LDS Church has not officially canonized these excerpts.

== See also ==
- Joseph Smith–History

Pearl of Great Price
Preceded by Book of Abraham	Pearl of Great Price	Succeeded by Joseph Smith–History
