= Harvest Hills Cooperative Community =

RLDS commune near Independence, Missouri, United States

The Harvest Hills Cooperative Community or Harvest Hills 'commune' was a communitarian experiment in communalism established in the late 1960s by the Reorganized Church of Jesus Christ of Latter Day Saints (renamed the "Community of Christ" in the year 2001), in keeping with early Latter Day Saint notions of "religious communism" alluded to in the New Testament. The location of the community is in the countryside of easternmost Independence, Missouri. The program was deemed somewhat successful during the 1970s and 1980s, and is still in existence today, albeit with reduced emphasis on Kibbutz-like "intentional community." Researcher Bryan R. Monte was recently honored by the John Whitmer Historical Association for a 2008 journal article about Harvest Hills entitled Harvest Hills at Thirty-five: Graying not Growing.

The Harvest Hills Cooperative is comparable in significance to the LDS Church's Church Welfare Program; both are modern efforts to comply with early Latter Day Saint beliefs concerning the Law of Consecration and the United Order.
