= Standing High Council =

The Standing High Council of the Community of Christ is composed of 12 persons holding the office of High Priest. The right to call members to the Council resides in the First Presidency and the call is sustained by a vote of the Community of Christ World Conference. The only mention of the council in the current church bylaws refers to their authority to approve church judicial procedures presented by the First Presidency. In practice, however, they also issue policy statements at the request of the First Presidency, such as the 1982 Standing High Council Statement on Homosexuality and the 1997 Standing High Council Statement on Privileged and Confidential Communications.

According to the Church Administrator's Handbook

The Standing High Council meets at the request of the First Presidency to consider questions of moral and ethical significance, to provide general advice and counsel to the First Presidency, and to consider appeals from courts of field jurisdictions. The Standing High Council may also advise the Presiding Bishopric when requested by the First Presidency.

As of 2012, the members of the Standing High Council are: William M. Barnhard, Kent G. Bradford, Valerie K. Brennan, David M. Byrn, Dennis R. Clinefelter, Matthew J. Frizzell, Gwendolyn Hawks-Blue, Sharon M. Kirkpatrick, Marilee A. Martens, Scott A. Roberson, Kathy D. Robinson, Patricia K. Trachsel.
