= Pearl of Great Price (Mormonism) =

Book of The Church of Jesus Christ of Latter-day Saints

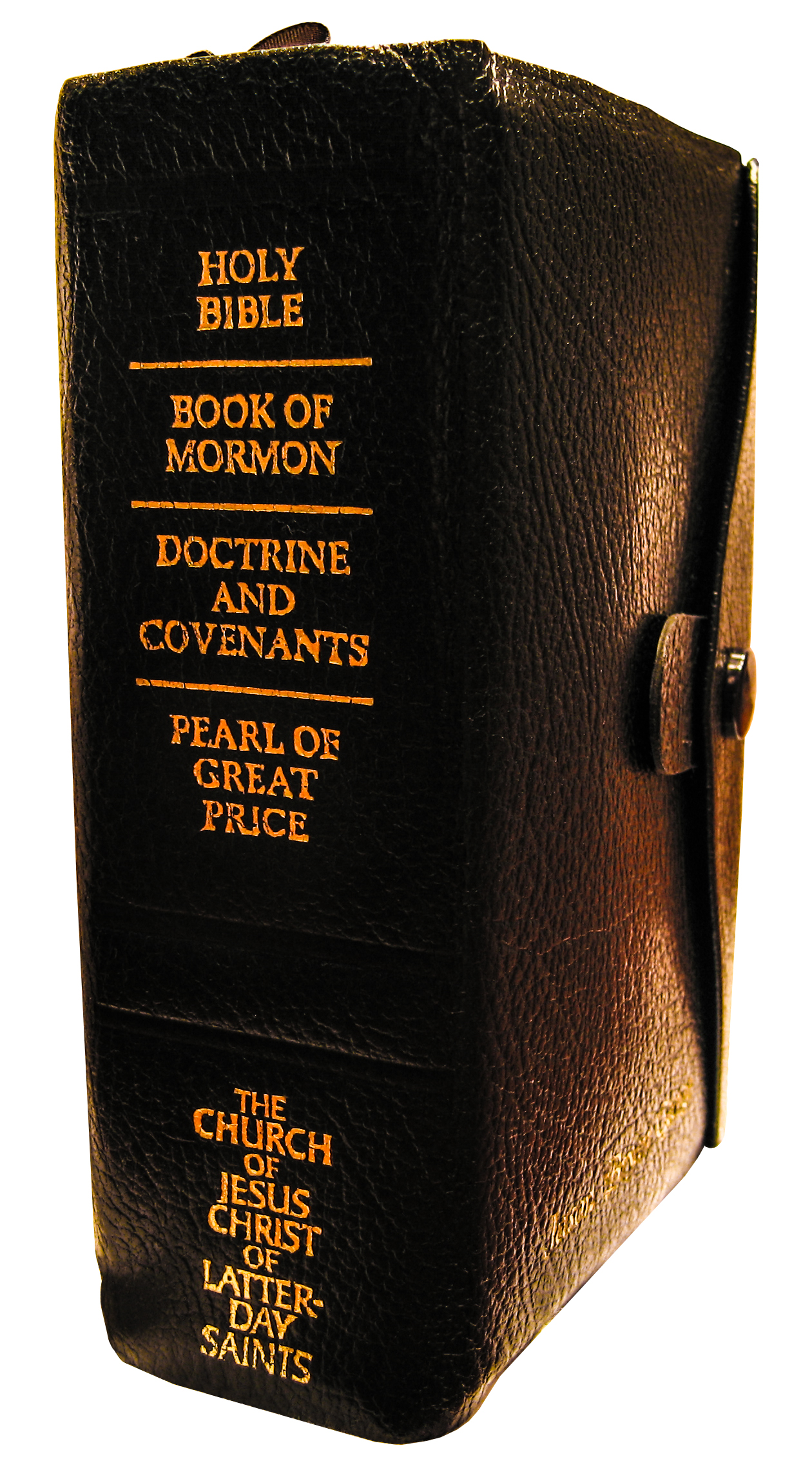
- The Pearl of Great Price is one of the four books composing the Standard Works of the LDS Church.

Information
- Religion: Latter Day Saint movement
- Language: English
- Period: 19th century
- Chapters: Book of Moses; Book of Abraham; Joseph Smith–Matthew; Joseph Smith–History; Articles of Faith (Latter Day Saints)

Wikisource
- Pearl of Great Price (1851); The Pearl of Great Price (1913)

The Pearl of Great Price is part of the canonical Standard Works of the Church of Jesus Christ of Latter-day Saints (LDS Church) and some other Latter Day Saint denominations. It began as a pamphlet of documents published by Franklin D. Richards in Liverpool, England, in 1851. It was later revised and canonized in 1880 by the Church of Jesus Christ of Latter-day Saints.

The first paragraph of the Introductory Note in the LDS Church edition of the Pearl of Great Price states: "The Pearl of Great Price is a selection of choice materials touching many significant aspects of the faith and doctrine of The Church of Jesus Christ of Latter-day Saints. These items were produced by Joseph Smith and were published in the Church periodicals of his day."

The Pearl of Great Price contains documents that have had a large impact on the beliefs, teachings, and theology of the Church of Jesus Christ of Latter-day Saints. For example, it provided a basis in text for the practice of gathering, a passible God, premortal existence, and a text that was used to justify a ban on Black Latter-day Saints participating in temple and priesthood rituals.

The name of the book is derived from the Parable of the Pearl told by Jesus in Matthew 13.

== Contents ==
The current version of the Pearl of Great Price contains five sections:

=== Book of Moses ===
The Book of Moses begins with the "Visions of Moses", a prologue to the story of the creation and the fall of man (Moses chapter 1), and continues with material corresponding to Smith's revision (JST) of the first six chapters of the Book of Genesis (Moses chapters 2–5, 8), interrupted by two chapters of "extracts from the prophecy of Enoch" (Moses chapters 6–7). Portions of the Book of Moses were originally published separately by the LDS Church in 1851, but later combined and published as the Book of Moses in the Pearl of Great Price. The same material is published by the Community of Christ as parts of its Doctrine and Covenants and Inspired Version of the Bible.

=== Book of Abraham ===
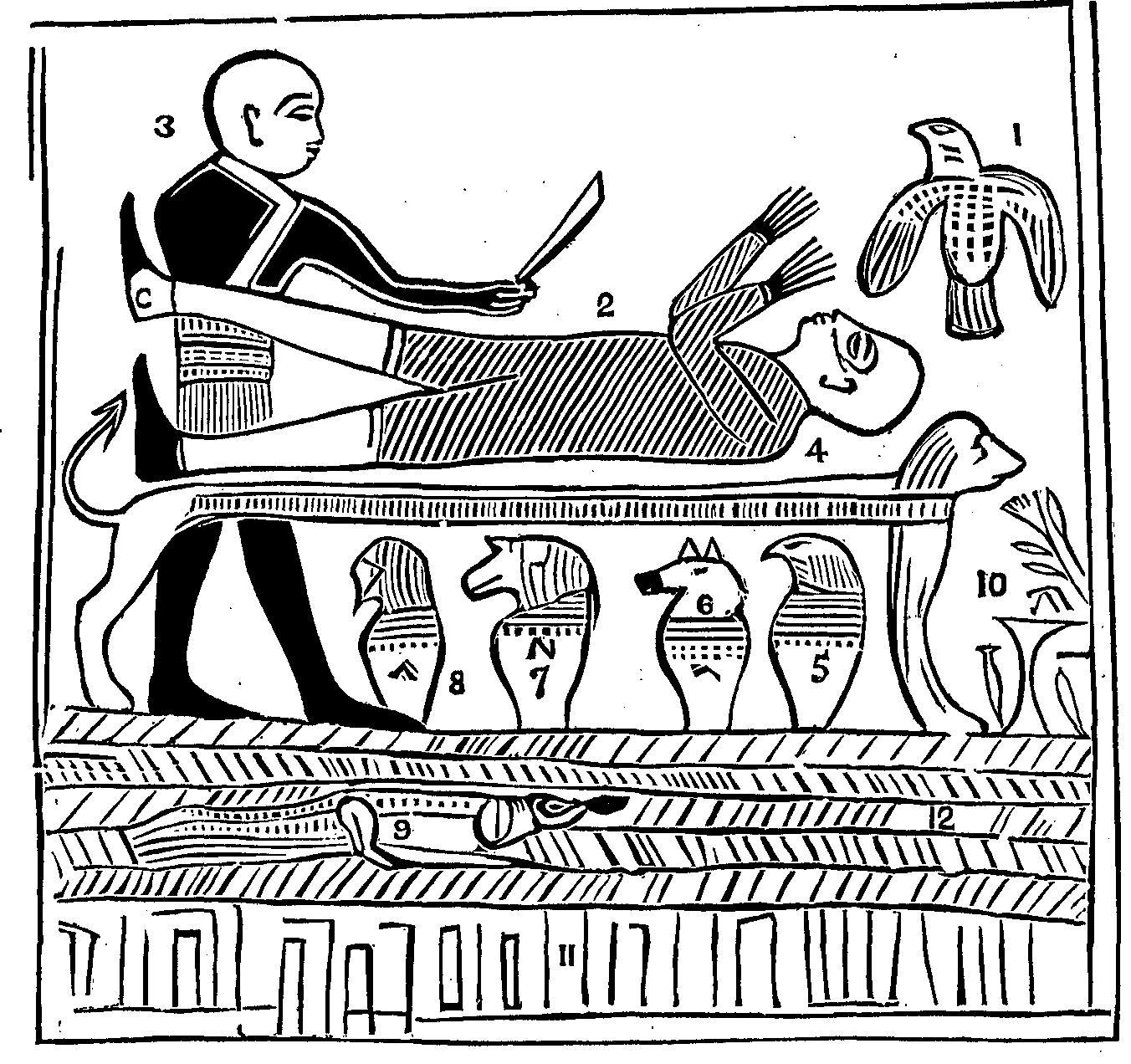
Facsimile Number 1 from the Book of Abraham: an alternate woodcut which was printed in the 1851 edition of the Pearl of Great Price

The Book of Abraham is an 1835 work produced by Joseph Smith who said it was based on Egyptian papyri purchased from a traveling mummy exhibition. According to Smith, the book was "a translation of some ancient records... purporting to be the writings of Abraham, while he was in Egypt, called the Book of Abraham, written by his own hand, upon papyrus". The text that Smith produced describes a story of Abraham's early life, including a vision of the cosmos.

The Book of Abraham was canonized in 1880 by the LDS Church as part of the Pearl of Great Price. Thus, it forms a doctrinal foundation for the LDS Church and Mormon fundamentalist denominations of the Latter Day Saint movement. It is not considered to be a religious text by the Community of Christ. Other sects in the Latter Day Saint movement have various opinions regarding the Book of Abraham, with some rejecting and some accepting the text as inspired scripture. The book contains several doctrines that are distinct to Mormonism, such as the concept of God organizing eternal, pre-existing elements to create the universe instead of creating it ex nihilo.

The Book of Abraham papyri were thought lost in the 1871 Great Chicago Fire. However, in 1966, several fragments of the papyri were found in the archives of the Metropolitan Museum of Art in New York, and in the LDS Church archives. They are now referred to as the Joseph Smith Papyri. Upon examination by professional Mormon and non-Mormon Egyptologists, these fragments were found to bear no resemblance to Smith's interpretation, and were identified as common Egyptian funerary texts, dating to about the first century BC. As a result, the Book of Abraham has been the source of significant controversy, with criticism from Egyptologists and Mormon apologists defending its authenticity.

=== Joseph Smith–Matthew ===
Joseph Smith–Matthew (abbreviated JS–M) is an excerpt from Joseph Smith's "retranslation" of portions of the Gospel of Matthew. It was originally published in 1831 in Kirtland, Ohio, in an undated broadsheet as "Extract from the New Translation of the Bible".

Joseph Smith–Matthew includes Smith's retranslation of Matthew 23:39 and all of Matthew chapter 24. The text deals mainly with Jesus' prophecy of the coming destruction of Jerusalem and of similar calamities that will precede his Second Coming. Joseph Smith–Matthew contains significant changes and additions to the original biblical text.

=== Joseph Smith–History ===
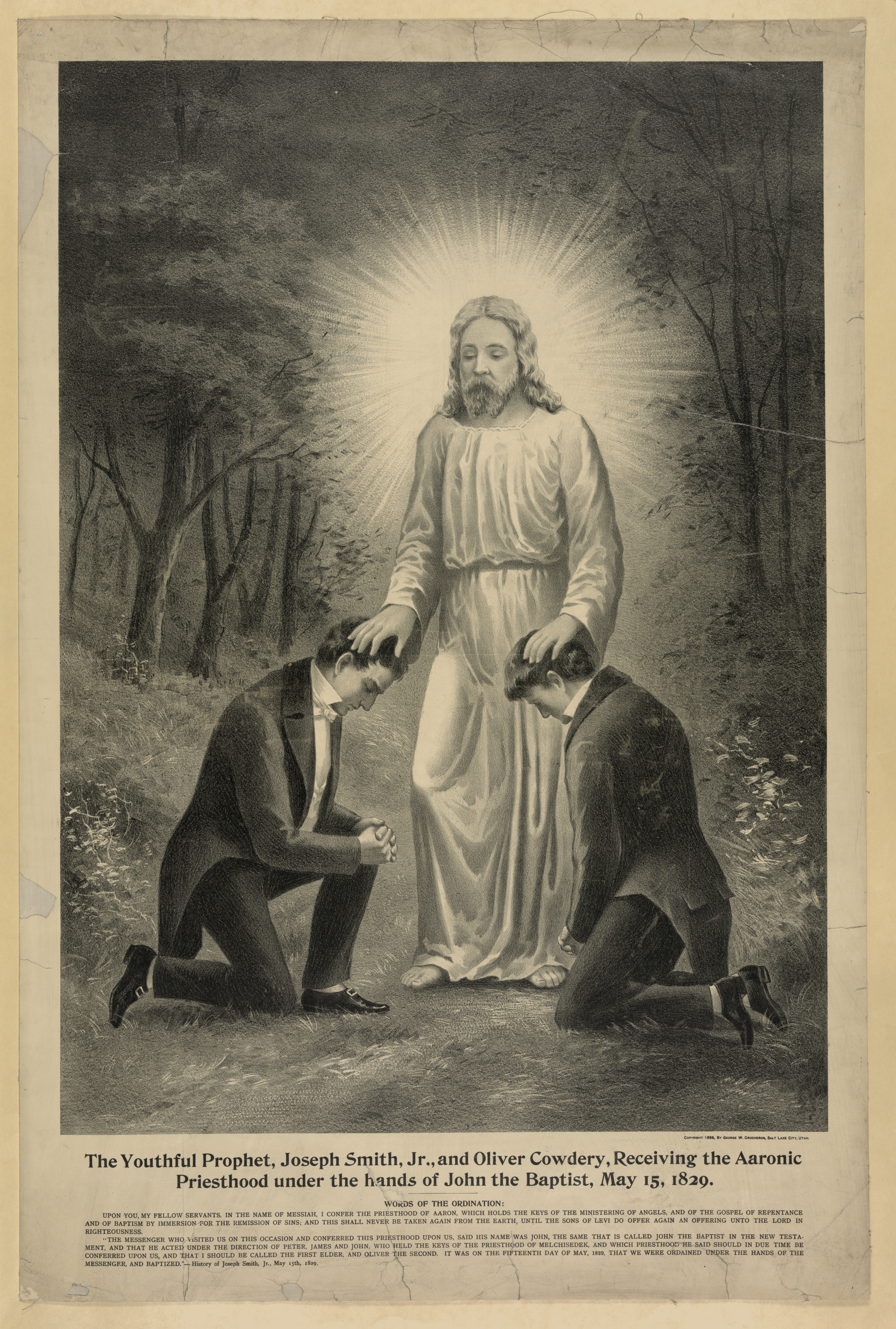
A 19th century depiction of John the Baptist conferring the Aaronic priesthood to Joseph Smith and Oliver Cowdery. This event is also recorded in Joseph Smith–History.

Joseph Smith–History (abbreviated JS–H) is a set of excerpts from the autobiographical record of some of the early events in Joseph Smith's life. Like many of Smith's publications, it was dictated to a scribe.

The incidents described in Joseph Smith–History include the First Vision and the visitation of the angel Moroni. In its current form, the narrative ends with Smith translating the Book of Mormon, shortly before the foundation of Smith's Church of Christ.

The original serial publication of the history in the Times and Seasons, Millennial Star, and Deseret News (later published as the six-volume History of the Church of Jesus Christ of Latter-day Saints) was much more extensive, including events in 1828 and 1830–1844 that were not included in the Pearl of Great Price JS—H.

=== Articles of Faith ===
The Articles of Faith are a creed composed by Joseph Smith as part of an 1842 letter sent to "Long" John Wentworth, editor of the Chicago Democrat, and first published in the Latter Day Saint newspaper Times and Seasons. It is a concise listing of the thirteen fundamental doctrines of Mormonism. Most Latter Day Saint denominations view the articles as an authoritative statement of basic theology. For some sects, such as the Restoration Branches, they are known collectively as "An Epitome of Faith and Doctrine".

== Major editions and changes ==
=== 1851 edition (Liverpool Edition) ===
The Pearl of Great Price was first compiled by Franklin D. Richards in Liverpool, England. Some items duplicated text that was already available in the Doctrine and Covenants. It contained the following entries (the placement of the text in today's LDS Church publications is noted in parentheses):

- Extracts from the Prophecy of Enoch (Moses 6:43–7:69)
- A message from God, given to Moses (Moses 1:1–42)
- Untitled (Moses 2:1–5; 8:13–30)
- The Book of Abraham including Facsimile Nos. 1, 2 and 3 from the Book of Abraham (Book of Abraham)
- An extract from a Translation of the Bible (Joseph Smith–Matthew)
- A Key to the Revelations of St. John (Doctrine and Covenants 77)
- A Revelation and Prophecy (Doctrine and Covenants 87)
- Extracts from the History of Joseph Smith (Joseph Smith–History)
- From the Doctrine and Covenants of the Church Commandment to the Church concerning baptism (Doctrine and Covenants 20:37, 71–75)
- The duties of members after they are received by baptism (Doctrine and Covenants 20:68–69)
- Method of administering the Sacrament of the Lord's Supper (Doctrine and Covenants 20:75–79)
- The Duties of the Elders, Priests, Teachers, Deacons, and Members of the Church of Christ (Doctrine and Covenants 20:38–44; 107:11; 20:45–59, 70, 80)
- On Priesthood (Doctrine and Covenants 107:1–10, 12–20)
- The Calling and Duties of the Twelve Apostles (Doctrine and Covenants 107:23, 33)
- The Calling and Duties of the Seventy (Doctrine and Covenants 107:34, 93–100)
- Extract from a revelation given July, 1830 (Doctrine and Covenants 27:5–18)
- Rise of the Church of Jesus Christ of Latter-day Saints (Doctrine and Covenants 20:1–36)
- Times and Seasons, vol. III, p. 709 (Articles of Faith)
- "Truth" (a poem by John Jaques) ("O Say, What is Truth?", #272 in LDS Church hymnal) (not a canonized work)

=== 1878 edition (Utah Edition) ===
The second edition of the Pearl of Great Price was prepared by Orson Pratt, with a committee finalizing preparations for publication consisting of Franklin D. Richards, Albert Carrington, Brigham Young Jr., and George Q. Cannon. This edition added portions of the Joseph Smith Translation to the Book of Moses that Richards did not have access to in 1851, drawing on the Reorganized Church of Jesus Christ of Latter Day Saints publication of the Inspired Version of the Holy Scriptures. The "Revelation on the Eternity of the Marriage Covenant, Including Plurality of Wives" (now Doctrine and Covenants section 132) was also added. This was the version of the Pearl of Great Price that was canonized by vote in 1880.

=== 1902 edition ===
The 1902 edition of the Pearl of Great Price was prepared by James E. Talmage. This edition removed several revelations that were duplicated in the Doctrine and Covenants. It is also the edition where the current versification and titles were introduced. These changes were accepted by vote in general conference in October 1902.

=== 1921 edition (Apostles Revision) ===
James E. Talmage continued to work on making improvements to the Pearl of Great Price, adding an index and putting the text in the double-column format in a 1921 edition. In addition, some revisions of the text were made, such as the expansion of Joseph Smith—History 1:20 to include an addendum from the original manuscript that had been incorporated into the text in the 1902 History of the Church of Jesus Christ of Latter-day Saints. New editions of the Book of Mormon and Doctrine and Covenants were also prepared at that time and began to be printed together as the "triple combination."

In 1976, two other documents, Vision of the Celestial Kingdom and Vision of the Redemption of the Dead, were added to the Pearl of Great Price at the suggestion of Bruce R. McConkie, and moved to the LDS Church edition of the Doctrine and Covenants (sections 137 and 138) in 1979.

=== 1981 edition (Triple Combination, Scriptures Publication Committee) ===
This edition of the Pearl of Great Price was published as part of the Triple Combination and received new or expanded chapter summaries, expanded footnotes cross-referencing all the Church’s standard works, and additional study aids at the end of the scripture text.

=== 2013 edition (2013 • Standard Works, Scriptures Committee) ===
Minor changes to introductions were made in the 2013 edition.

== Miscellaneous ==
A copy of the Pearl of Great Price owned by NASA photographer M. Edward Thomas's wife Ruth C. Thomas traveled to the Moon and back in 1972 with astronaut John Young aboard Apollo 16.

When working on the 1981 edition, Bruce R. McConkie suggested adding several documents to the Pearl of Great Price:

- The Wentworth Letter
- Two new Articles of Faith
- The Lectures on Faith
- More excerpts from the Joseph Smith Translation of the Bible
  - JST Genesis 8:23
  - JST Genesis 9:15–25
  - JST Genesis 14:26–40
  - JST Genesis 15:5, 7b, 8–12; 17:1–14
  - JST Genesis 48:3–11
  - JST Genesis 50:24–38
  - JST Psalm 11
  - JST Psalm 12
  - JST Psalm 14
  - JST Psalm 24
  - JST Matthew 3:19–28
  - JST Matthew 5:1–50
  - JST Matthew 6:1–39
  - JST Matthew 7:1–37
  - JST Matthew 21:34b–56
  - JST Luke 3:1–20
  - JST Luke 12:40–58
  - JST Luke 17:34–40
  - JST John 1:1–34

Ultimately, these suggestions were not accepted.
