= Charles D. Neff =

American missionary (1922–1991)

Council of Twelve Apostles
- October 8, 1958 – April 5, 1984
- Predecessor: Daniel T. Williams
- Successor: Geoffrey F. Spencer
- Reason: Williams ordained as 'Patriarch/Evangelist'
- End reason: Honorably released

Personal details
- Born: Charles Daniel Neff; March 24, 1922; Hardin, Missouri
- Died: July 16, 1991 (aged 69)
- Resting place: Mound Grove Cemetery; 39.1128°N 94.4281°W
- Education: BS in Economics (at CMS)
- Alma mater: Ottawa University; Central Missouri State
- Spouse(s): Frances Dillon
- Children: Robert Neff; Nancy Neff; Susan Neff; John Neff

Charles Daniel Neff (March 24, 1922 – July 16, 1991) was an American missionary who had a great impact on the mission and theology of the Reorganized Church of Jesus Christ of Latter Day Saints (now the Community of Christ). He also founded the humanitarian agency Outreach International and the Community One Resources Development Inc. also known as CORD.

As an Apostle, a leadership position in the RLDS Church, from 1958 to 1984, he was responsible for helping start the church in Japan, South Korea, the Philippines, India, Nigeria, Liberia and Kenya.

His missionary work in these countries challenged him to rethink the church's theology – opening it to the voices of other cultures – and confronted him with the horrific realities of massive poverty.

== Early life and family ==
Born in Hardin, Missouri, USA in 1922, Neff grew up in a poor but not destitute rural family during the Great Depression. He was the first in his family to attend college, starting at Ottawa University in Ottawa, Kansas, eventually finishing with a BS in Economics from Central Missouri State Teachers College.

He served as an officer in the United States Navy during World War II in the Pacific theater from 1943 to 1945. He saw heavy combat at the battles of Tarawa, Guam, the Philippines and Okinawa. When the war ended, he was sent to Japan as part of the occupation force and was in Hiroshima three weeks after the atomic bomb was dropped.

"There were hideous sights, like people whose flesh had been torn from bone and muscle so it hung down just like bundles of rags," said Neff. This made an indelible mark on his heart, and he vowed to commit his life and work to helping the suffering.

He first encountered the Community of Christ (at that time, called the Reorganized Church of Jesus Christ of Latter Day Saints) through Frances Dillon, whom he later married. They had four children: Robert, Nancy, Susan and John.

== Philosophy and theology ==
Neff believed that the entire gospel, and church doctrine, could be boiled down into two essential and non-negotiable principles "the reality of a personal God and the worth of humans." He felt it was the church's mission to incarnate these principles through social development, religious witness and political activism.

Neff particularly emphasized the importance of:

1. Community. He felt the church should help people "understand that they are fundamentally not individuals but a collective social being that finds fulfilment and satisfaction in interaction with all persons within that society."
2. Indigenization and Cultural Sensitivity. Neff believed that "Once the gospel is brought to a nation the interpretation, expression, application, and communication of it should reflect a local, contemporary, and national color...." He objected to the term 'missions abroad' as "though they are a kind of 'white man's burden.'" Neff argued mission ought to be a "two-way street" with all cultures able to "be both senders and receivers" of missionaries.
3. Liberation for the Poor and Dispossessed. Drawing on liberation theology, Neff believed God ultimately favored the poor and oppressed, and worked for their liberation. He thus believed the church must also do so. He said, "When I think of the mission of the Church, I am frequently compelled to recall the face of the poorest and most helpless person I have ever seen and ask myself if the program we are undertaking will be of any use to that person. Will it restore him the dignity that every man should enjoy? Will it set him free? Will it heal his broken heart?"
4. Human Equality. In the late 1970s and through the 1980s, he worked hard to advocate for women's rights within the church. He even suggested that the system of priesthood itself should be abolished because he felt it was an inherently hierarchical system.
5. Anti-Militarism. As a result of his experiences in World War II, and having observed the results of conflicts in Nigeria and the Philippines, he became quite distrustful of the use of military force. In an address to some 5000 people at the Community of Christ World Conference in 1982 he declared, "The fashioning of nuclear weapons and threatening to use them is a sin...." He helped found the Kansas City Interfaith Peace Alliance and was involved in the campaign against US-sponsored counterinsurgencies in Central America.

Community of Christ titles
Preceded by Daniel T. Williams	Council of Twelve Apostles; October 8, 1958–5 April 5, 1984	Succeeded by Geoffrey F. Spencer
