= Joseph Smith–History =

Canonical work of the Latter-day Saints

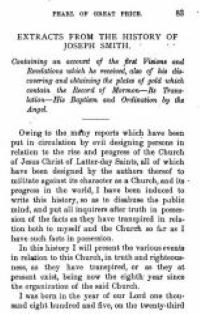
- First page of Joseph Smith–History in the 1888 edition of the Pearl of Great Price
- Type: Personal account
- Date: 1838
- Place of origin: Far West, Missouri
- Language: English
- Scribe(s): James Mulholland, Robert B. Thompson, W. W. Phelps, Willard Richards
- Author: Joseph Smith Jr.
- Compiled by: Franklin D. Richards
- Contained in the Pearl of Great Price; Part of the scriptural canon of the Church of Jesus Christ of Latter-day Saints

Joseph Smith–History (abbreviated JS–H) is a book in the Pearl of Great Price containing excerpts from an autobiographical record of some of the early events in the life of Joseph Smith, the founder of the Latter Day Saint movement. Like many of Smith's publications, it was dictated to scribes.

The recording of Joseph Smith–History began in 1838 in Far West, Missouri. Scribes included James Mulholland, Robert B. Thompson, W. W. Phelps, and Willard Richards. Other early leaders in the Church of Jesus Christ of Latter Day Saints, such as Brigham Young, George A. Smith, and Eliza R. Snow, contributed in different ways to the development of the record. It was first published piece by piece in the Latter Day Saint periodicals Times and Seasons, Deseret News, and the Millennial Star. The serial history would later be edited by B.H. Roberts and published between 1902 and 1912 as a 2,000-page history entitled History of the Church.

The Joseph Smith–History was published in 1851 by Franklin D. Richards as selected excerpts from the beginning of the History of the Church as part of his collection, the Pearl of Great Price. This collection became part of the scriptural canon of the Church of Jesus Christ of Latter-day Saints (LDS Church) on October 10, 1880, during the 50th semiannual general conference of the church.

Joseph Smith–History spans 12 pages in the Pearl of Great Price and tells of 14-year-old Joseph Smith's experiences with religious contention and his First Vision, and, later, the visitation of the angel Moroni to him, the coming forth of the Book of Mormon, and the restoration of the Aaronic priesthood. Through these accounts it touches on religious ideas such as baptism, prophets, and the nature of God. It has been used as a proselyting tool by Mormon missionaries; today, they are encouraged to memorize and recite Joseph Smith's account of the First Vision.

== History ==
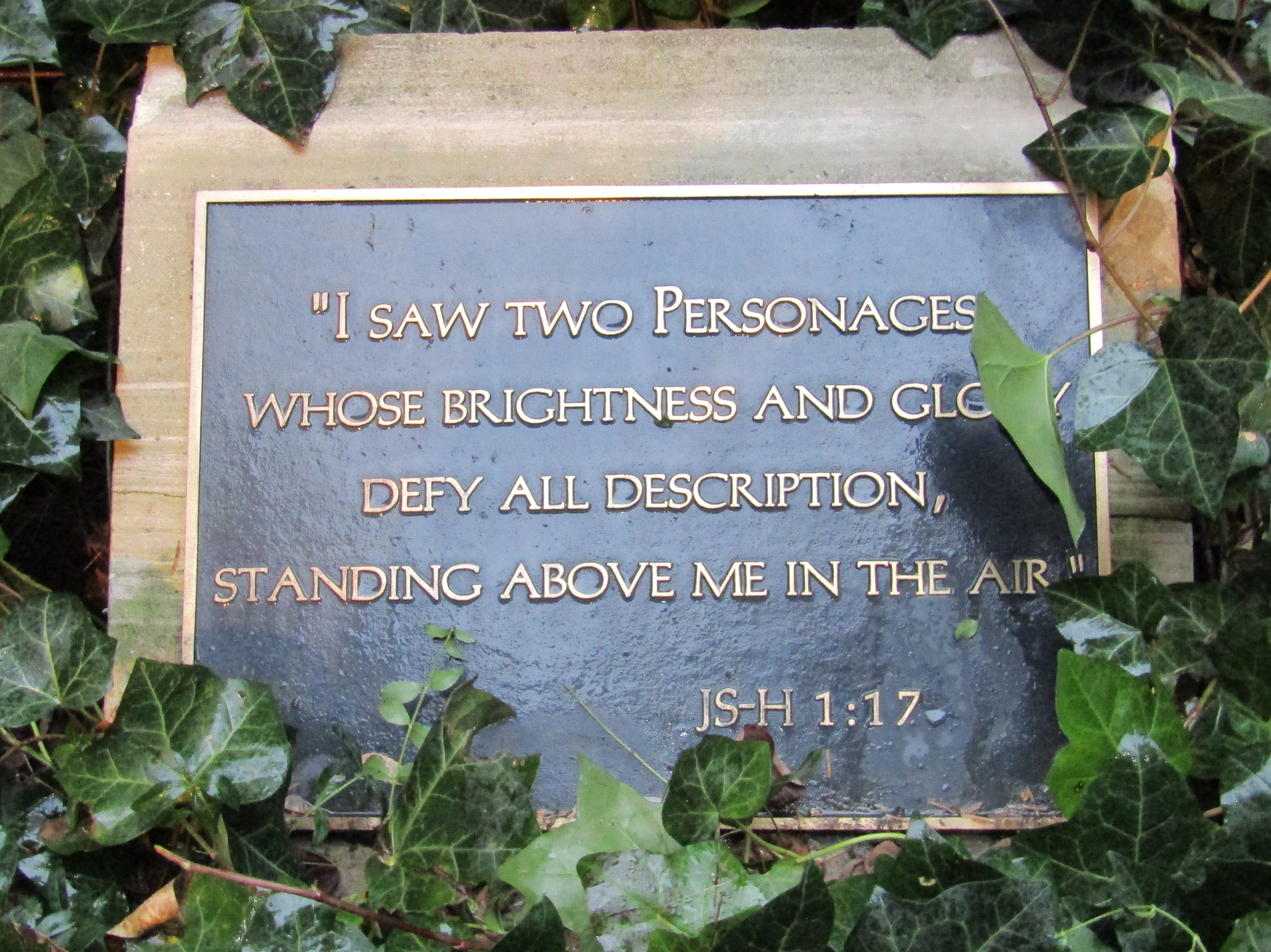
A plaque featuring Joseph Smith–History 1:17

When the Church of Christ was organized on April 6, 1830, Joseph Smith received a revelation from God (now known as Doctrine and Covenants 21:1), commanding the Latter Day Saints to record their history. Smith attempted to record a history seven times before work on what is now Joseph Smith–History began; each of these attempts was unsuccessful, being either left incomplete or deemed unsatisfactory by Smith. He told W. W. Phelps, "There are but few subjects that I have felt a greater anxiety about than my history". The account found in Joseph Smith–History is the product of the 1838 attempt undertaken by Smith and other early Latter Day Saint leaders to record the history of the church. Smith's motivation for creating this history was twofold: to adhere to God's direction to record his experiences, and to respond to critics of his story. The paranoia that led up to the 1838 Mormon War may have had an effect on the opening passage of Joseph Smith–History, when Smith states: "Owing to the many reports which have been put in circulation ... I have been induced to write this history, to disabuse the public mind."

Work on the history began in Far West, Missouri on September 3, 1838. Because he had never received formal education, Smith mostly dictated his history verbally to scribes instead of writing it himself. The passages the scribes recorded were later rewritten in the first person, so as to be from Smith's point of view. The first scribe to work on the history was James Mulholland. Smith drew on material from his incomplete history (begun in 1838) while dictating to Mulholland. After scribing 59 pages, Mulholland abruptly died on November 3, 1839, halting the project for a time until Robert B. Thompson picked it up again. However, Thompson was only able to scribe 16 pages due to his untimely death on August 27, 1841. William W. Phelps then became Smith's scribe. Progress on the record was slow due to the task of building up the city of Nauvoo.

The 1851 edition of the Pearl of Great Price

It wasn't until December 1842, when Willard Richards—Smith's personal secretary and editor of the Times and Seasons—became scribe that a substantial amount of the history was recorded. In 1844, Richards wrote: "It is now seven years since I have laid my head one night in my own house during that time I have been in England, near four years and the remainder of the time have spent in writing the History of the Church of Jesus Christ of Latter Day Saints, which, of course will afford no income until it is completed and printed which cannot possibly be done for one or two years. It is a great work and all important to the Church and the world." The history was one of Smith's main priorities in Nauvoo. Richards and Phelps remembered that he once asked the schoolmaster of a nearby class to change locations because noise from the students was distracting those tasked with compiling the record. Smith instructed them to be thorough, pulling information from sources such as newspapers and the records of city council meetings and other organization proceedings.

While in Carthage Jail, Smith expressed to Richards his wish that work on the history continue. Richards kept his promise, spearheading the production of the history for the next decade. After Smith's death, the Quorum of the Twelve Apostles also took over responsibility for the history. Brigham Young began his task of reviewing and revising the record in April 1845. The people involved in the project were able to follow the pattern and style Smith had laid out. As the Mormons were preparing to leave Nauvoo, they were encouraged to gather together any documents that would prove useful to the history. By the time they exited the city, the history included Smith's story up until March 1, 1843. Henry Fairbanks and Thomas Bullock transported the manuscript across the Great Plains. Bullock brought them into the Salt Lake Valley under the direction of Willard Richards. No significant progress was made on the history thereafter until George A. Smith became church historian. He oversaw the addition of 844 pages, ending with a record of August 8, 1844. He drew on various sources, such as transcriptions of Joseph Smith's sermons and sketches of his life previously written by record keepers such as Smith's scribes and Eliza R. Snow. Many of these records George A. Smith inspected had been damaged over time. Wilford Woodruff also worked on the project in his capacity as assistant church historian; he helped gather the testimonies of those who had known Joseph Smith, many of which contradicted each other. The history was completed in August 1856 after a total of 17 years of work. The account eventually expanded into the multi-volume History of the Church (also known as Documentary History of the Church), edited by B. H. Roberts and published in its current format in 1902. It was 2,000 pages long in its entirety.

=== Early publication ===
The history was published serially in the newspaper Times and Seasons from March 15, 1842, until February 15, 1846. It was first featured in volume 3, issue 10 of the paper. The portion scribed by Mulholland was what was featured in the Times and Seasons. This selection was later printed into a pamphlet, called "Joseph Smith's Own Story," to be used for proselyting purposes. It was also published in the Millennial Star, the Latter Day Saint publication in England. After the Mormon pioneers arrived in Utah Territory, the record was printed in the Deseret News beginning on November 15, 1851.

=== Extraction and canonization ===
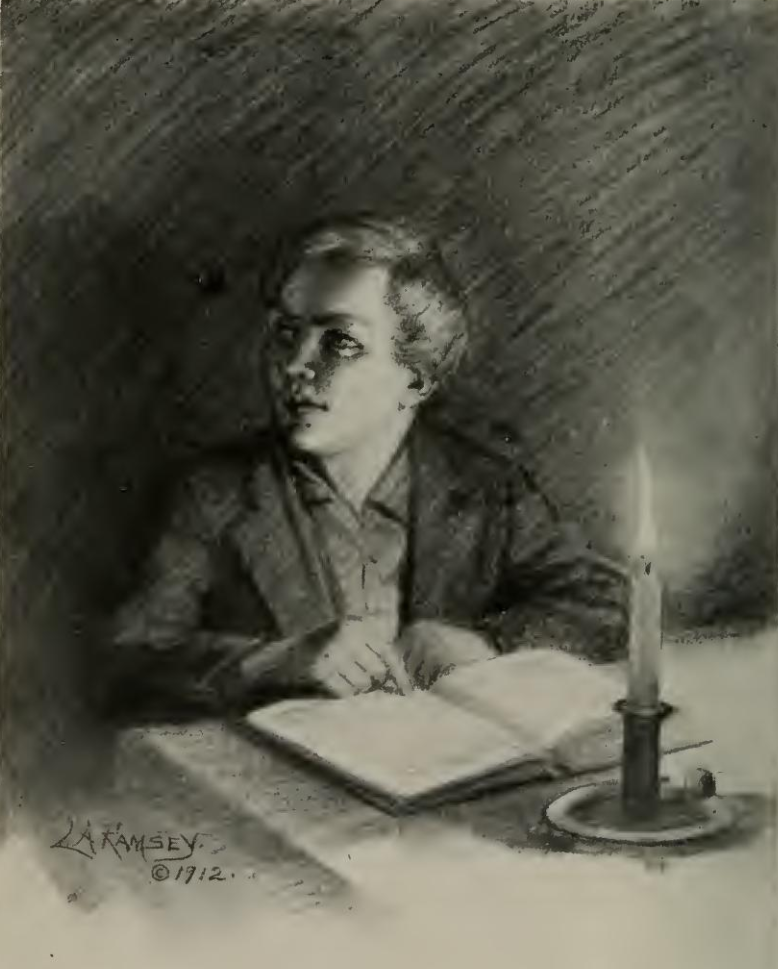
A depiction of the young Joseph Smith reading the Bible.

Franklin D. Richards, Willard Richards's nephew and a member of the Quorum of the Twelve Apostles, extracted excerpts from the History of the Church and published them in 1851, hoping that the selection would "increase the members' ability to defend the faith." In the years leading up to the canonization of Joseph Smith–History, Brigham Young and other leaders of the church had expressed growing concern over members' lack of understanding of church history, particularly among the younger generations. Richards focused on extracting the main events of the text, excluding revelations given to Smith in God's words. He emphasized that this passage's intended audience was existing members of the church, not newcomers to the faith. Church leader Orson Pratt recognized the value of Smith's history and played a pivotal role in its becoming important in the eyes of church members. He also recognized its potential as a proselyting tool; the mid to late 1800s saw a boom in the usage of Smith's account by missionaries. When Franklin Richards compiled the Pearl of Great Price, he chose to include the passage he had extracted from the History of the Church. The excerpts had been pulled from the earliest section of the history: the 59 pages scribed by James Mulholland.

Joseph Smith–History subsequently became part of the official standard works of the LDS Church on October 10, 1880, when the Pearl of Great Price was canonized during the 50th semiannual general conference. The motion was brought forth by George Q. Cannon and Joseph F. Smith. John Taylor was appointed president of the church at that same general conference. After the proceedings, the manuscript was sent to James E. Talmage, then a professor at the University of Utah, for some minor editing: mainly, adding footnotes and organizing the passages into chapters and verses. Talmage's edited version was accepted in 1902 and published as the first edition of the Pearl of Great Price. Joseph Smith–History remained relatively untouched throughout the canonization process. It spans 12 pages in the Pearl of Great Price.

== Content ==
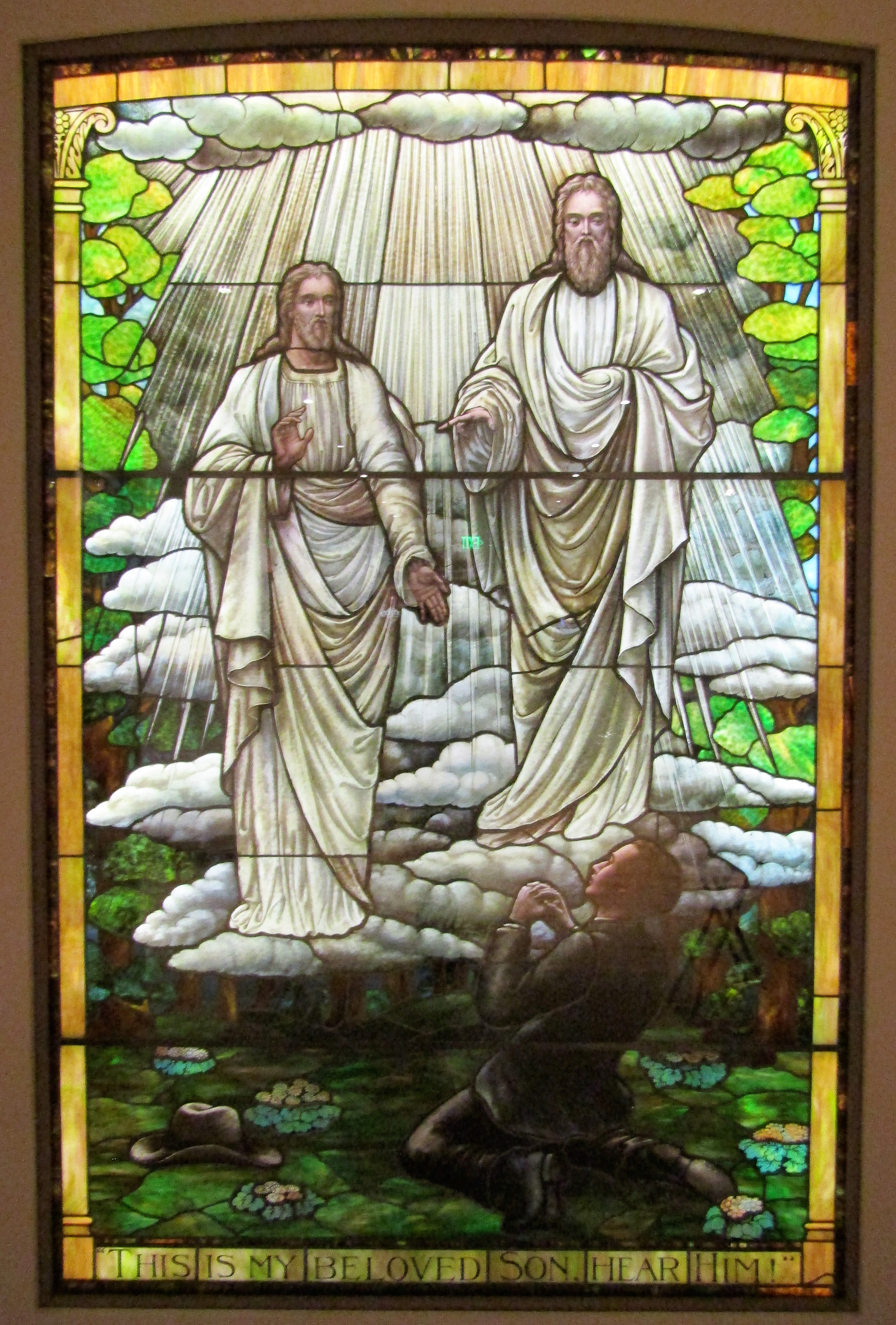
A stained glass window at the Church History Museum in Salt Lake City, Utah depicting Joseph Smith's First Vision.

The events recounted in Joseph Smith–History begin with a succinct record of Joseph Smith's genealogy and birth. They then proceed to a description of the confusion Smith felt at the age of fourteen pertaining to the various Christian sects that had grown to prominence around him. He mentions by name the Methodist, Baptist, and Presbyterian churches as being in opposition to each other. These opening verses display Smith's personal search for knowledge and his becoming convinced that an answer from God directly was required in order to know which church to join. Smith then describes turning to the Bible for answers and discovering the invitation to "ask of God" in James 1:5. Verses 5 through 20 then comprise one of the four accounts of Joseph Smith's First Vision, in which he testifies of having seen God the Father and His Son Jesus Christ:

"...I saw a pillar of light exactly over my head, above the brightness of the sun, which descended gradually until it fell upon me. It no sooner appeared than I found myself delivered from the enemy which held me bound. When the light rested upon me I saw two Personages, whose brightness and glory defy all description, standing above me in the air. One of them spake unto me, calling me by name and said, pointing to the other—'This is My Beloved Son. Hear Him!'" — Joseph Smith—History, verses 16-17

These verses in Joseph Smith–History are the only official, canonized version of the First Vision. According to the account, God and Christ instructed Smith not to join any of the churches. Following the First Vision, Smith describes the prejudice and persecution he faced from religious leaders and others in his community. He then tells about the visitation of the angel Moroni and the coming forth of the Book of Mormon.

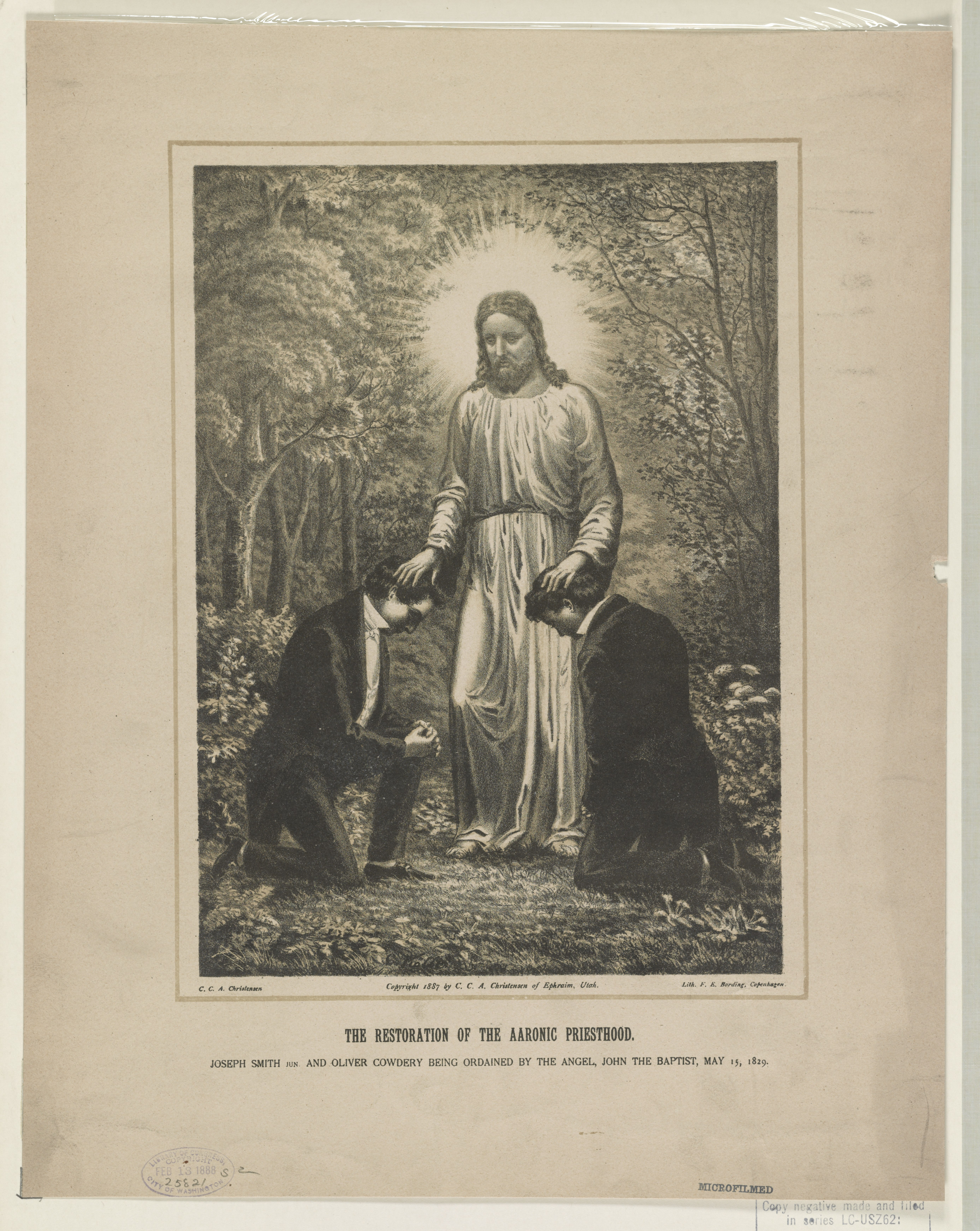
A depiction of the restoration of the Aaronic priesthood to Joseph Smith and Oliver Cowdery, as described in Joseph Smith–History 1:68–69

The remainder of the account includes details about Joseph Smith's marriage to his wife, Emma Hale, his experience receiving the ancient Book of Mormon record and beginning translation, and Professor Charles Anthon authenticating the characters found on the golden plates. It also includes his interactions with two major participants in the translation process, Martin Harris and Oliver Cowdery. The passage concludes with the restoration of the Aaronic priesthood by John the Baptist to Joseph Smith and Oliver Cowdery in verses 68 and 69. The timeline of the events described in Joseph Smith–History ends in May 1829.

While the body of the text is written from Joseph Smith's perspective, the current edition of Joseph Smith—History includes a footnote with a description from Joseph's scribe, Oliver Cowdery, taken from Messenger and Advocate. Here, Cowdery records some of his thoughts about being involved in the translation process of the Book of Mormon.

== Religious significance ==
Since its canonization, Joseph Smith–History has become "a foundational piece of literature for the [LDS] Church." It inspired a tradition of record keeping in Mormon culture and the church itself. Besides the Book of Mormon, Joseph Smith–History is a "major literary tool of conversion... that has thoroughly benefitted missionary efforts worldwide." Today, Preach My Gospel, the training manual for Mormon missionaries, encourages its readers to be prepared to quote Smith's description of the First Vision verbatim as it appears in Joseph Smith–History. Select verses from the passage are also used by missionaries to teach others about the need for the restoration of the gospel of Jesus Christ and the need for a prophet. Other doctrines found in Joseph Smith–History include baptism, the priesthood, prayer, the appearances of angels, and the Godhead. The account of the First Vision—in which Smith sees both God the Father and Jesus Christ simultaneously—challenges the doctrine of the trinity. Additionally, the part describing Moroni's appearance to the young Joseph Smith alludes to a prophecy contained in Isaiah 29. The events described in Joseph Smith–History also refute the belief that God no longer communicates with beings on earth. Milton R. Hunter, a member of the LDS Church's Council of the Seventy, wrote that "in many respects it [the Pearl of Great Price] holds an [sic?] unique position and in all respects it supplements and sustains the other standard works of the Church of Jesus Christ."

== See also ==
- Joseph Smith–Matthew

== Notes ==
Pearl of Great Price
Preceded by Joseph Smith–Matthew	Pearl of Great Price	Succeeded by Articles of Faith
