= Life of Joseph Smith from 1827 to 1830 =

The life of Joseph Smith from 1827 to 1830, when he was 22–25 years old, begins in late 1827, after Smith announced he had obtained a book of golden Plates buried in a hill near his home in Manchester, New York (near Palmyra village). Because of opposition by former treasure-seeking colleagues who believed they owned a share of the golden plates, Smith prepared to leave the Palmyra area for his wife's home town of Harmony, Pennsylvania (now Oakland). From late 1827 to the end of 1830, Smith dictated what he stated was a translation of ancient writing on the plates, published the dictation as the Book of Mormon, and established the Church of Christ.

To dictate the Book of Mormon, Smith enlisted the assistance of Martin Harris, a wealthy Palmyra landowner who acted as Smith's scribe. Smith said that he used seer stones (one set of which Smith later called the Urim and Thummim) to translate the plates. Translation ceased, however, when Harris lost 116 manuscript pages of uncopied text. Translation resumed in earnest when Smith was joined in May 1829 by a Smith family associate named Oliver Cowdery. Translation was completed near the end of July 1829, and the resulting manuscript was published as the Book of Mormon on March 26, 1830, in Palmyra.

By the time the Book of Mormon was published, Smith had baptized several followers who called themselves the Church of Christ. On April 6, 1830, Smith and five others formally established the Church of Christ in western New York. Among the most notable early converts was Sidney Rigdon, a Disciples of Christ (Campbell Movement) minister from Kirtland, Ohio, who already shared many early beliefs of the Latter Day Saint movement. With Rigdon came most of Rigdon's congregation, and at the end of 1830, Smith decided that all members of his new church should move to Kirtland.

== Dictation of the Book of Mormon ==
=== Early transcription and dictation ===
In late October 1827, Joseph and his family arrived in Harmony, Pennsylvania. They stayed temporarily in the home of Emma's father Isaac Hale, while Hale set them up in a home on an adjoining 13-acre (5.3 ha) property near the Susquehanna River. Skeptical that Smith had found golden plates, Hale asked to see them, but was only allowed to lift the glass box in which Smith said they were kept. Nevertheless, Hale refused to allow the plates in his home if he could not see them, so they were hidden in the woods nearby, where the plates are said to have remained during much of the translation process that followed.

After a short stay in the Hale home, Joseph and Emma arranged to live in a house moved onto the Hale property. Emma said that for at least part of the time, Joseph kept the plates in this house on a table, wrapped in a linen tablecloth. Beginning in December 1827, Smith began transcribing the characters he said were engraved on the plates, and dictating what he said was a translation of some of them. While transcribing, he reportedly sat behind a curtain and looked at the plates through the Urim and Thummim, passing the written transcriptions to Emma, who was sitting on the other side of the curtain. Eventually, after some transcription, he began to dictate what he said was a translation of the plates to Emma or her brother Reuben. To translate, he reportedly "put the urim and thummim into his hat and Darkened his Eyes than [sic] he would take a sentance [sic] and it would apper [sic] in Brite [sic] Roman Letters. Then he would tell the writer and he would write it." Reportedly, Smith did not need the physical presence of the plates to create the translation, and the plates remained in the nearby woods during the translation.

=== Visit to Charles Anthon and others ===
Martin Harris, who had previously been recruited to the translation effort, came to Harmony to assist with the translation in February 1828.

In February 1828, after visiting Smith in Harmony, Harris took a sample of the characters Smith had copied to a few prominent scholars, including Charles Anthon. He said Anthon initially authenticated the characters and their translation, but then retracted his opinion after learning that Smith claimed to have received the plates from an angel. Anthon denied Harris's account of the meeting, claiming instead that he had tried to convince Harris that he was the victim of a fraud. In any event, Harris returned to Harmony in April 1828 and began serving as Smith's scribe.

Harris also visited several other well-known scholars, including at least Luther Bradish in Albany, New York and Samuel L. Mitchill of New York City. The purpose of these visits was to see if they could translate or authenticate some of the transcribed characters, but Harris was unable to get any of the scholars' help or backing.

=== Loss of 116 manuscript pages ===
After visiting his home in Palmyra, Harris then returned to Harmony in the middle of April 1828 and began acting as Smith's scribe while Smith dictated what he later would call the Book of Lehi. Harris reported that for at least part of Smith's early translation, Smith used his seer stone to translate, rather than the Urim and Thummim, because the stone was more convenient. Smith also at least sometimes made use of a curtain; Harris stated that one time during the translation, Smith raised a curtain between him and Harris, because "the presence of the Lord was so great", or sometimes Smith dictated to Harris from upstairs or from a different room.

By the middle of June 1828, Smith had dictated about 116 manuscript pages of text, beginning with a story about a man named Lehi in Jerusalem, and ending with a story about King Benjamin, one of his descendants, in the Americas. Harris, however, was having marital problems with his wife Lucy, who was upset about not being able to see the plates. Hoping to appease her, and to quell his own doubts, Harris convinced a reluctant Smith to allow him to take the 116 manuscript pages with him on a visit back home in Palmyra. Because the manuscript was the only copy, however, Smith made Harris sign a written oath that he would show the pages only to five specified people in his family.

While Harris visited Palmyra, Emma gave birth to the young couple's first child, but the boy was deformed and stillborn, leaving Emma deathly ill for about two weeks. Not hearing word from Harris for three weeks, Smith traveled in July 1828 to Palmyra and learned that Harris had lost the manuscript pages, and had been avoiding him. Despite his oath, Harris had been exhibiting the manuscript to numerous visitors, and somehow it had disappeared from the drawer where he kept it.

Smith was despondent over losing his child and the manuscript. He had had great hopes for his first-born child, reportedly telling people that the child would see the plates, and that he would assist in the translation. After returning to Harmony without Harris, Smith dictated to Emma his first written revelation, which rebuked him for losing the manuscript pages, but pinned most of the blame upon Harris.

During this period, Smith also reportedly joined a local Methodist Episcopal Church Sunday school class in Harmony. This church was attended by Emma's family, and led by Nathaniel Lewis, Isaac Hale's brother-in-law. His membership, however, was resisted by several members who were aware of his treasure hunting activities, and Smith voluntarily withdrew his membership.

=== Resumption of dictation ===
As part of the penalty for losing the manuscript, Smith said the angel took away the Urim and Thummim, returning it once again on September 22, 1828, the autumn equinox and the anniversary of the day he first received the plates. Smith said the angel also temporarily took back the plates during that time.

By February 1829, Smith had begun dictating sporadically with Emma as scribe. Smith resumed the translation beginning at the story of King Benjamin now found in the Book of Mosiah, where Smith had left off with Harris before losing the 116 pages. In February, when Smith's parents visited Harmony, and Smith dictated a revelation for his father, an optimistic description of the translated book as a "marvelous work…about to come forth among the children of men".

According to Emma, Smith no longer used the Urim and Thummim in the process after the loss of the 116 manuscript pages; rather, he began using exclusively his dark seer stone. He dictated after sitting "with his face buried in his hat with the seer stone in it, and dictating hour after hour with nothing between us". While looking at the stone, he "rest[ed] his elbows upon his knees", and drew the hat "closely around his face to exclude the light", so that the "spiritual light" would shine.

The dictation during this time was sporadic, in part because Emma was busy running the household, and Joseph was working outside the home. They received some support for the translation, however, including money for paper, from Joseph Knight Sr., Smith's associate from his treasure hunting expeditions.

In March 1829, Harris returned to Harmony and wanted to see the plates first hand. Smith reportedly told Harris that Smith "would go into the woods where the Book of Plates was, and that after he came back, Harris should follow his tracks in the snow, and find the Book, and examine it for himself"; after following these directions, however, Harris could not find the plates. The next day, Smith dictated a revelation indicating that there was no need for the present "unbelieving" generation of humanity to see the plates because—in the words of God—"if they will not believe my words" written on the plates, "they would not believe my servant Joseph, if it were possible that he could show them all things."

=== Arrival of Oliver Cowdery ===
On April 5, 1829 Oliver Cowdery arrived at Smith’s residence. Cowdery, a school teacher born in Vermont, had heard about Smith's golden plates while he boarded with the Joseph Smith Sr. family during the school year, and had traveled with Joseph's brother Samuel Harrison Smith to Harmony hoping that he could serve as Smith's scribe. Smith was happy to have his assistance, and on April 7, 1829, Smith and Cowdery began working on the dictation full-time. During this time, they received financial support from Joseph Knight Sr.

In April 1829, Smith stated that Cowdery had a "gift" that could allow Cowdery to translate ancient hidden records, and that the "keys of this gift" to translate would be given both to Smith and to Cowdery. According to the revelation reported by Smith, this gift to translate was not limited to the golden plates, but included other ancient hidden records. For example, Smith's next revelation was what he said was the translation of a hidden parchment written by John the Apostle, and presumably still hidden at the time of the translation.

While Cowdery, too, was to have the "gift" to translate, when Cowdery attempted his own translation of some unknown hidden record, he was unsuccessful, and he returned to acting as Smith's scribe. Consequently, a revelation by Smith stated that Cowdery's translation of hidden records would have to wait until after Smith had fully translated the golden plates.

With Cowdery as scribe, Smith continued dictating what he said was the translation of the golden plates. On or before May 1829, Smith dictated a revelation warning him that whoever had stolen the 116 manuscript pages was planning to wait until Smith re-translated that section of the golden plates, and then alter it, to show Smith could not translate the same words twice. Therefore, according to the revelation, God's plan was for Smith to "go on unto the finishing of the remainder of the work as you [Smith] had begun", and instead of going back and re-translating the original 116 manuscript pages, Smith was to substitute a translation which he would create from another set of plates, called the "plates of Nephi", which covered roughly the same material, except in more detail.

On May 15, 1829, according to Cowdery's later reminiscences, what is now the book of Third Nephi led Smith and Cowdery to pray so that they could receive authority to baptize. Thus, they said that an angel appeared, granting them that authority, and then they baptized each other in a river near their home in Harmony. Ten days later, they baptized Samuel, who was still residing with them.

In late May 1829, Samuel Smith returned home to Palmyra, reporting to the Smith and Harris families that Smith's translation with Cowdery as scribe was proceeding rapidly. Samuel's report excited Martin Harris, but angered Harris's wife Lucy, who gathered witnesses and filed a criminal complaint against Smith in Lyons, New York, in an attempt to prove that Smith was pretending to have the golden plates in order to defraud her husband. A trial proceeded in absentia against Smith, but was dismissed after the judge heard the testimony of Martin Harris.

Meanwhile, a group of people in Harmony began to threaten the progress of Smith's translation. Therefore, Oliver Cowdery wrote to one of his acquaintances named David Whitmer in Fayette, New York, who had previously shown an interest in the golden plates, and got permission for Smith and Cowdery to stay at David Whitmer's parents' house in Fayette while they completed the translation. The Whitmers were happy to oblige, and offered free room and board. Thus, David Whitmer took a large wagon to Harmony at the beginning of June 1829, and moved Smith and Cowdery to Fayette. This time, Smith said he gave the plates to an angel, who transported the plates and then delivered them to Smith in Fayette. However, by this time, Smith was not directly using the plates in the process of dictating. Emma did not initially accompany Smith to Fayette, although she came later for a time.

== Completion and publication of the Book of Mormon ==
=== Initial publication attempt ===
At the Whitmer home in Fayette, New York, Smith, Cowdery, David Whitmer, David's brother John Whitmer, and another scribe whose handwriting has not been identified worked to complete the Book of Mormon.

On June 11, 1829, to secure his copyright, Smith deposited a copy of the title page with the local federal district court. In the early part of June 1829, Smith also took a copy of the title page and a few pages of text to Palmyra village and attempted during several interviews to make arrangements to have his work published by E. B. Grandin, publisher of The Wayne Sentinel and friend of Martin Harris. Although Grandin provided an approximate estimate of the costs, he initially declined to publish the book. As for funding, Smith attempted unsuccessfully to secure the financial assistance from several family acquaintances.

=== Twelve witnesses and the completion of translation ===
During the remainder of June 1829, Smith continued the work of translation in Fayette by dictating a replacement section for the 116 pages previously lost by Harris. Some time before June 14, 1829, a revelation by Smith commanded Cowdery and Whitmer to seek out twelve "disciples", who desired to serve, and who would "go into all the world to preach my gospel unto every creature", and who would be ordained to baptize and to ordain priests and teachers. Soon thereafter in the second half of June 1829, a group of Three Witnesses and a separate group of Eight Witnesses were selected, in addition to Smith himself, to testify that Smith had the golden plates.

The Three Witnesses were selected soon after a visit by Harris to the Whitmer home in Fayette, accompanied by Smith's parents, to inquire about the translation. When Harris arrived, he joined with Oliver Cowdery and David Whitmer to request that the three be named as the Three Witnesses referred to in the much earlier revelation directed to Harris, and also referred to in a recently translated portion of the plates called the Book of Ether (2:2–4). In response, Smith dictated a revelation that the three of them would see the golden plates. Thus, Smith took the three of them to the woods near the Whitmer home and they had a shared vision in which they all claimed to see (with their "spiritual eyes", Harris reportedly said) an angel holding the golden plates and turning its leaves. The four of them also said they heard "the voice of the Lord" telling them that the translation of the plates was correct and commanding them to testify of what they saw and heard.

The Eight Witnesses were selected a few days later when Smith traveled to Palmyra with the males of the Whitmer home, including David Whitmer's father Peter, his brothers Christian, Jacob, and John, and his brother-in-law Hiram Page. Smith took this group, along with his father Joseph Smith Sr. and his brothers Hyrum and Samuel to a location near Smith's parent's home in Palmyra where the angel had transported the plates, where Smith said he showed them the golden plates. Like the Three Witnesses, the Eight Witnesses later signed an affidavit for inclusion at the end of the Book of Mormon.

After the experiences of the twelve witnesses, Smith continued the translation at the Whitmer home in Fayette. On June 26, 1829, E.B. Grandin published in The Wayne Sentinel a copy of the Book of Mormon title page Smith had given him earlier, and offered it to his readers as a "curiosity", stating that "[m]ost people entertain an idea that the whole matter is the result of a gross imposition, and a grosser superstition". Possibly because of this article and Smith's growing notoriety, the late stages of Smith's translation were interrupted periodically with curious visitors. Translation was completed around July 1, 1829, after which Smith reportedly returned the plates to the angel.

=== Publication of the Book of Mormon and associated notoriety ===
Smith's first attempt at arranging publication of the Book of Mormon with E.B. Grandin was unsuccessful. Harris had also unsuccessfully approached Jonathan A. Hadley, another Palmyra printer who published the anti-Masonic Palmyra Freeman. Smith and Harris also traveled to Rochester, New York and approached Thurlow Weed, a publisher who, like Grandin and Hadley in Palmyra, also refused to publish the book, even though Harris offered his farm as security. Smith next approached Weed's competitor in Rochester, Elihu F. Marshall, who agreed to publish the book. With Marshall's offer in hand, Smith and Harris then approached Grandin a second time, hoping for a better offer that wouldn't require travel to Rochester. Negotiations with Grandin continued from July to August 1829. On August 25, 1829, Grandin entered into a secured transaction, using Harris's land as collateral, to print 5,000 copies of the book for $3,000, to be paid within 18 months after printing began. Half the sum was to be paid by Harris, and the other half was to be paid by Smith and his brother Hyrum.

While Smith was attempting to arrange for publication during July and August 1829, several area newspapers ran harshly critical articles on the Book of Mormon, and reprinted the title page published on June 26, 1829, in The Wayne Sentinel. This began with a Palmyra Freeman article written by Jonathan A. Hadley. Between August and October 1829, the Hadley article was reprinted in Lockport, New York, Rochester, New York, Painesville, Ohio, and Salem, Massachusetts. In July and August, the Biblical-sounding language style of the Book of Mormon's title page was satirized by a series of articles in a Rochester paper.

In October, Smith moved to Harmony, Pennsylvania to rejoin his wife Emma, leaving Oliver Cowdery in charge of supervising the publication in Palmyra. Before leaving, Smith said he had a revelation that the original manuscript should remain in the Smith home while Cowdery made a copy, then Hyrum Smith would take only enough of the transcript for each day's typesetting to Grandin's office per day, accompanied by a guard, while Peter Whitmer guarded the Smith home.

Smith arrived in Harmony on October 4, 1829, where he found the opposition that had caused his move to Fayette had abated. In order to pay his $1500 share of the costs for printing the Book of Mormon, Smith attempted unsuccessfully to raise at least $500 from his old friend Josiah Stowell. He also sent Cowdery and Hiram Page as missionaries to Toronto, unsuccessfully, to raise money by selling the book's Canadian copyright.

In January 1830, Hyrum Smith and Cowdery discovered that Abner Cole, publisher of the Palmyra newspaper The Reflector, had taken portions of the pre-published Book of Mormon and began printing them in his newspaper. The paper was printed at E. B. Grandin's printing shop on nights and weekends, and therefore Cole had access to the unpublished Book of Mormon text. Unable to convince Cole to stop printing, Hyrum and Oliver sent for Smith, who returned briefly from Harmony and convinced Cole to submit the matter to an arbitrator, who held that Cole's publication was a copyright infringement and ordered him to stop.

Later in January 1830, a group of Palmyra citizens passed a resolution calling for a local boycott of the Book of Mormon. As a result, Grandin stopped printing in January 1830. In addition, Harris was coming to realize that the full share of the $3,000 cost of printing the book would fall on his shoulders when it came due in early 1831, and under the prodding of his wife Lucy, was considering breaching his contract to pay his share. In response, Smith traveled once again from Harmony Palmyra, and placated Harris by entering into a contract on January 16, 1830 stating: "I hereby agree that Martin Harris shall have an equal privilege with me and my friends of selling the Book of Mormon of the edition now printing by Egbert B. Grandin until enough of them shall be sold to pay for the printing of the same". Smith and Harris then went to Grandin's office, and convinced Grandin to resume printing, which he did on January 26, 1830.

In late March 1830, Smith travelled once again from Harmony to Palmyra. The first advance copies of the Book of Mormon were becoming available, and Harris was attempting to sell them, but not getting any buyers. Harris, therefore, waffled on his commitment to pay the printing costs. In response, Smith dictated a revelation commanding Harris, upon penalty of eternal damnation he could not imagine, to: "Impart a portion of thy property; Yea, even a part of thy lands and all save the support of thy family. Pay the printer's debt." Harris renewed his commitment to pay the printing costs, and on March 26, 1830, Grandin made copies of the Book of Mormon available for purchase at the bookshop on the ground floor of his shop.

== Bible revision ==
In June 1830, Smith dictated a revelation in which Moses narrates a vision in which he sees "worlds without number" and speaks with God about the purpose of creation and the relation of humankind to deity. This revelation initiated a revision of the Bible which Smith worked on sporadically until 1833 but which remained unpublished until after his death. Smith expressed to his followers that this "new translation" of the Bible would be published "as soon the Lord permit." He may have considered it complete, though according to Emma Smith, the biblical revision was still unfinished when Joseph died.

In the course of producing the Book of Mormon, Smith declared that the Bible was missing "the most plain and precious parts of the gospel". He produced a "new translation" of the Bible, not by directly translating from manuscripts in another language, but by amending and appending to a King James Bible in a process which he and Latter Day Saints believed was guided by inspiration; Smith asserted his translation would correct lacunae and restore what the contemporary Bible was missing. While many changes involved straightening out seeming contradictions or making small clarifications, other changes added large interpolations to the text. For example, Smith's revision nearly tripled the length of the first five chapters of Genesis into a text called the Book of Moses.

=== Book of Moses ===
The Book of Moses itself begins with Moses speaking with God "face to face" and seeing a vision of all existence. Moses is initially overwhelmed by the immensity of the cosmos and humanity's smallness in comparison, but God then explains that he made the earth and heavens to bring humans to eternal life. The book subsequently provides an enlarged account of the Genesis creation narrative which describes God having a corporeal body, followed by a rendering of the fall of Adam and Eve in celebratory terms which emphasize eating the forbidden fruit as part of a process of gaining knowledge and becoming more like God. The Book of Moses also expands the story of Enoch, described in the Bible as being an ancestor of Noah. In the expanded narrative, Enoch has a theophany in which he discovers that God is capable of sorrow, and that human sin and suffering cause him to grieve. Enoch then receives a prophetic calling, and he eventually builds a city of Zion so righteous that it is taken to heaven. Enoch's example inspired Smith's own hopes to establish the nascent Church of Christ as a Zion community. The book also elaborates some passages that (to Christians) foreshadowed the coming of Christ, into explicit Christian knowledge of and faith in Jesus as a Savior - in effect Christianizing the Old Testament.

== Early ecclesiastical leadership ==
=== Informal "Church of Christ" in 1829 and early 1830 ===
Even before translation of the Book of Mormon was completed, Smith and Cowdery began baptizing several converts to the new faith. These adherents referred to themselves as the Church of Christ. In June 1829, in response to concerns by Cowdery, Smith dictated a revelation commanding Cowdery to "build up my church", based upon the theological principles Smith had been dictating, he said, from the golden plates. Possibly in conformance with this revelation, some time later in 1829 Cowdery said he received his own revelation, called the Articles of the Church of Christ, about "how he should build up his church & the manner thereof". Cowdery was described in his revelation as "an Apostle of Jesus Christ". Similarly, several of the other Twelve Witnesses to the Book of Mormon were described by people of the Palmyra area as "apostles" or "elders" in this new faith, and beginning in August 1829 some of them were given missions to preach the gospel.

During the winter of 1829, when Smith was attempting to raise money for the publication of the Book of Mormon, Smith is said to have received a revelation through his seer stone sending Cowdery and Hiram Page on a mission to Canada to sell the Book of Mormon's Canadian copyright for $8,000. This mission, however, was unsuccessful, and the group returned empty-handed to the Whitmer home in Fayette, New York, where Smith was then visiting. As the group did not understand why the previous revelation had directed the group to carry out an unsuccessful mission, according to the recollection of David Whitmer, Smith received another revelation indicating that "[s]ome revelations are of God: some revelations are of men; and some revelations are of the devil." In early 1830, Smith reportedly discontinued the use of his seer stones in dictating revelations, from then on dictating the revelations based solely upon the impressions the Holy Spirit was said to have put in his mind.

=== Formal organization of the Church of Christ ===
By the spring of 1830, Smith had in mind the idea that his informal body of believers who called themselves the Church of Christ should be organized as a formal, legal body. Therefore, Smith traveled from Harmony to the Manchester-Palmyra area. In March 1830, just before publication of the Book of Mormon. Smith stayed in Palmyra until April 6, 1830, the date he had chosen to formally organize the church. While in Manchester that day, a Tuesday, Smith dictated a series of short revelations, including a revelation stating that Smith was to be considered "a seer, a translator, a prophet, an apostle of Jesus Christ, an elder of the church". The revelation stated that Smith was to be the first "elder" in the Church of Christ, while Cowdery was to be the "first preacher". Then several people, including Martin Harris and Joseph Smith Sr., but apparently not Joseph Smith himself, were baptized that night in a nearby dammed-off stream. The majority of witnesses say this organizational event took place in the log home of Joseph Smith Sr. in the Manchester area, followed by a meeting the next Sunday in Fayette, New York. Nevertheless, one of Smith's histories, and a later statement by David Whitmer place the event in Fayette.

On April 11, 1830, the first Sunday after the Tuesday, April 6 organization date, the newly formed church held its first worship services in Fayette, attended by a much larger group of about 30 people. At least six other people were baptized that day in the nearby Seneca Lake, and at least seven others were baptized on the following Sunday, April 18, after a revelation two days earlier had stated that new converts had to be rebaptized into "a new and an everlasting covenant" regardless of any prior baptism. Oliver Cowdery, as the "first preacher", took the lead in both baptism and the giving of sermons. Smith and the leaders of his church also began teaching and baptizing in Colesville, New York, near Smith's home in Harmony, where his friend Joseph Knight Sr. lived. The Colesville meetings were "well-attended" and led to several baptisms, particularly after word got out that Smith had performed an exorcism of one of Joseph Knight's sons.

Thus, by June 1830, the new church had about 30 members. On June 9, 1830, the church held its first conference in Fayette. It was on this occasion that Smith called for a vote on the Articles and Covenants of the Church of Christ, which would serve as the church's constitution. At the conference, several said they had visions, others fainted and had to be laid on beds, others shouted hosannas.

=== Colesville branch ===
In addition to the members in the Palmyra-Manchester area and in Fayette, Smith soon found followers in Colesville, New York, a town near Harmony on the Susquehanna River. Smith's friend Joseph Knight Sr. lived there, and the Universalist Knight had been receptive to Smith's ideas. In April 1830, Smith visited Colesville and held several "well-attended" meetings. Smith achieved a great deal of notoriety when he reportedly performed an exorcism on one of Knight's sons, Newel Knight. This exorcism convinced several Colesville residents to be baptized, including eventually Newel, who traveled to Fayette in late May to be baptized, and was present during the June 9, 1830 conference, where he fell into a trance and awoke saying he'd had a theophany.

After the June 9, 1830 conference and a brief return home to Harmony, with Knight's exorcism in recent memory, Smith dictated what was described as a secret vision of Moses, not to be shown "unto any except them that believe", in which Satan attempted to convince Moses that he was Jesus. Much later, while speaking about the early history of the church, Smith said he had heard "[t]he voice of Michael on the banks of the Susquehanna, detecting the devil when he appeared as an angel of light". Although Smith did not give a date for this event, it could have occurred during this time when he was thinking about exorcisms and appearances of the devil near the Susquehanna.

In late June 1830, Smith, Emma, Cowdery, and John and David Whitmer visited Colesville and baptized Joseph Knight Sr., many of his family, and several others in the area. This activity, and the recent exorcism of Newel Knight, aroused the animosity of a group of local residents, leading to Smith's arrest by the local constable on "disorderly person" (vagrancy) charges. Smith was transported to South Bainbridge, New York. His two-day trial took place in late June, ending on July 1, 1830, and he was defended by two attorneys hired by Joseph Knight, who got him acquitted. Immediately after his release, however, he was arrested again and transported back to Colesville for a second trial, for which he was also acquitted.

After a few days home in Harmony, Smith returned to Joseph Knight's house in Colesville with Cowdery, but after they saw a mob gathering, were quickly forced to run all night back to Harmony, while pursued by the mob, stopping only once to rest under a tree. A source who said he heard Smith describe this flight in 1844 said that while resting at the tree, Smith and Cowdery were visited by Peter, James, and John who gave them their priesthood "keys", which according to Smith included "the keys of the kingdom, and of the dispensation of the ful[l]ness of times".

=== Mission to indigenous tribes and recruitment of Sidney Rigdon ===
In October 1830, after the second church-wide Conference the month before, Smith dispatched Oliver Cowdery on his mission to indigenous tribes, called the "Lamanites" by Smith and his followers. Cowdery was accompanied by Parley P. Pratt, a recent convert who had been a missionary for the Disciples of Christ in Amherst, Ohio. On their way to the "Lamanites", the missionaries passed by Kirtland, Ohio, where there was a Disciples of Christ congregation, and converted its minister Sidney Rigdon and about 20 members of his congregation. Then Cowdery's delegation continued toward their destination of the "Lamanites" west of the Mississippi River.

Meanwhile, Rigdon traveled the opposite direction from Ohio to Fayette, New York to see Smith, arriving in December 1830. To mark the occasion, Smith dictated a revelation directed to Rigdon comparing Rigdon with John the Baptist, stating that like John, Rigdon had previously "baptized by water unto repentance, but they received not the Holy Ghost". But now, when Rigdon would baptize, they would "receive the Holy Ghost by the laying on of hands, even as the apostles of old". Furthermore, Rigdon was to watch over Smith, that Smith's "faith fail not", and as long as Smith was faithful, he would have the "keys" to reveal all the "mysteries" of God that had previously been "sealed". If Smith was not faithful, God would "plant [another] in his stead".

In the absence of Cowdery, Rigdon became Smith's new scribe, and Smith dictated to Rigdon what Smith said was a translation of the Prophecy of Enoch, a "lost book" referred to in the Book of Jude. The project of translating the "sealed" mysteries of God was soon postponed, however, as a revelation in late December 1830 indicated that the church headquarters was to move from Fayette to Kirtland to await Oliver Cowdery's return there from his mission to the "Lamanites".

Preceded by 1805–27	Joseph Smith; 1827–30	Succeeded by 1831–37
