= Book of Mormon witnesses =

Early members of the Latter Day Saint movement

The Book of Mormon witnesses were a group of contemporaries of Joseph Smith who claimed to have seen the golden plates from which Smith translated the Book of Mormon. The most significant witnesses were the Three Witnesses and the Eight Witnesses, all of whom allowed their names to be used on two separate statements included with the Book of Mormon and church leaders contend that the witnesses never denied their accounts. Critics have challenged the nature and reliability of the accounts.

== Three Witnesses ==
The Three Witnesses were a group of three early leaders of the Latter Day Saint movement who wrote in a statement of 1829 that an angel had shown them the golden plates from which Joseph Smith translated the Book of Mormon and that they had heard God's voice testifying that the book had been translated by the power of God.

The Three Witnesses were Oliver Cowdery, Martin Harris, and David Whitmer, whose joint testimony, in conjunction with a separate statement by Eight Witnesses, has been printed with every edition of the Book of Mormon since its first publication in 1830. All three witnesses eventually broke with Smith and were excommunicated from the church. In 1838, Joseph Smith called Cowdery, Harris, and Whitmer "too mean to mention; and we had liked to have forgotten them." Oliver Cowdery temporarily became a member of the Methodist Church, while Martin Harris adopted some Shaker beliefs. After the death of Joseph Smith, Harris and Cowdery sought rebaptism in the Church of Jesus Christ of Latter-day Saints and Whitmer founded the Church of Christ (Whitmerite).

The Three Witnesses

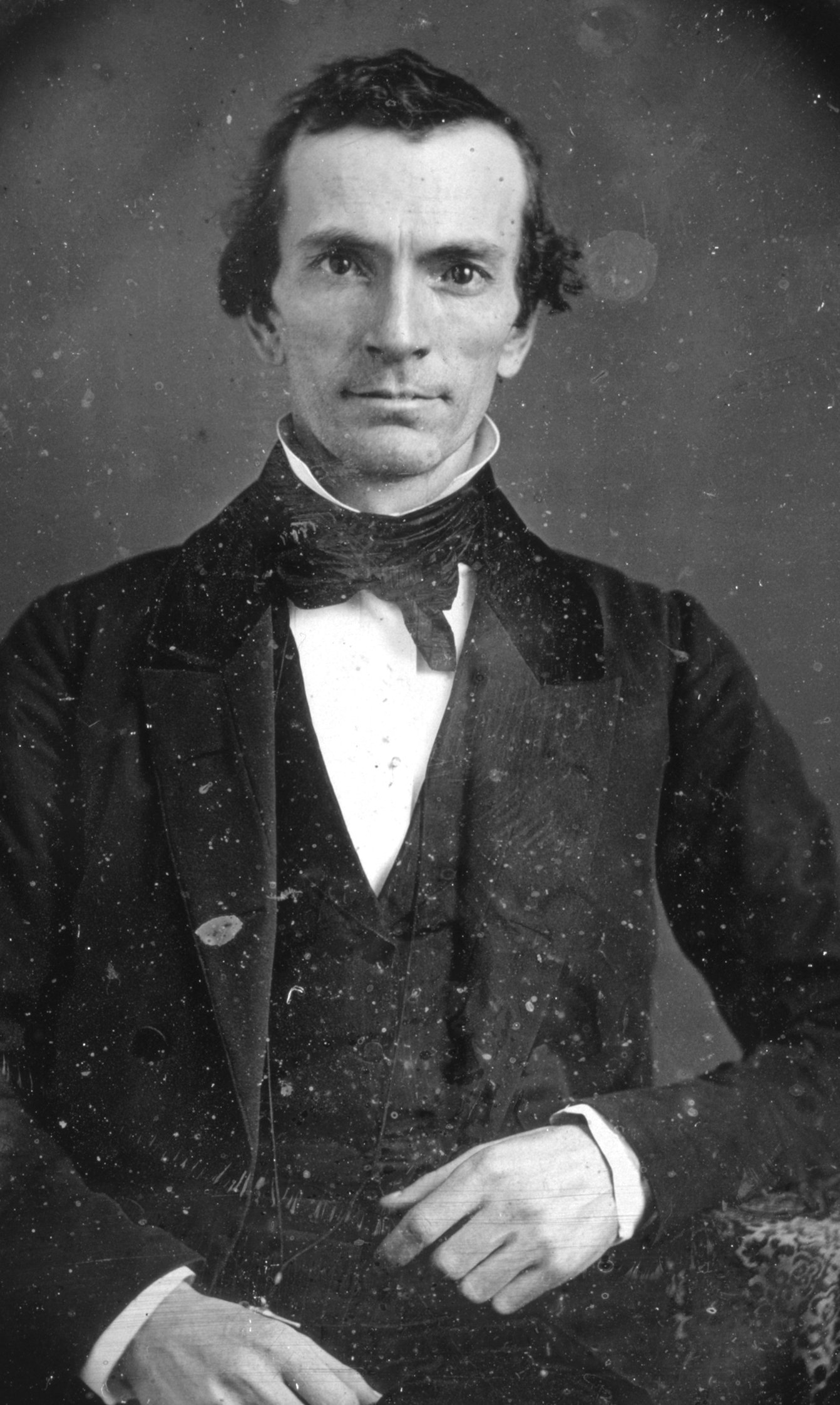
Oliver Cowdery

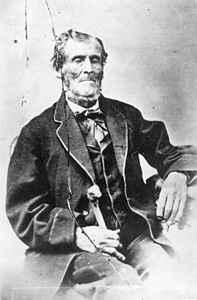
Martin Harris

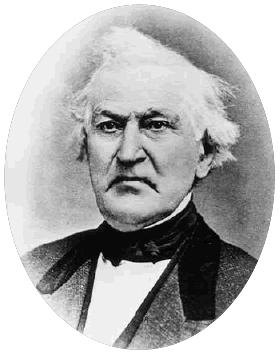
David Whitmer

== Eight Witnesses ==
The Eight Witnesses were the second of the two groups of "special witnesses" to the Book of Mormon's golden plates. They were all members of the Whitmer or Smith families: Christian Whitmer; Jacob Whitmer; Peter Whitmer, Jr.; John Whitmer; Hiram Page; Joseph Smith, Sr.; Hyrum Smith; and Samuel Harrison Smith. Joseph Smith Sr. was Joseph's father, and Hyrum and Samuel H. Smith were his brothers. Christian, Jacob, Peter Jr. and John were David Whitmer's brothers, and Hiram Page was his brother-in-law.

Unlike the Three Witnesses, the Eight testified that they both saw and handled the plates. Another difference is that the Eight testified they were shown the plates by Joseph Smith rather than by an angel as the Three had. Christian Whitmer died in 1835 and his brother Peter Whitmer, Jr. died the following year. In 1838, the surviving Whitmers became estranged from Joseph Smith during a leadership struggle in Far West, Missouri, and all three were excommunicated with other dissenters, never to rejoin The Church of Jesus Christ of Latter-day Saints. None of the Eight Witnesses are known to have denied his testimony of the authenticity of the Book of Mormon or the golden plates.

Name	Date of birth	Place of birth	Occupation	Death
Christian Whitmer	18 January 1798 (Age 31)	Harrisburg, Pennsylvania	Shoemaker, law enforcement officer	27 November 1835 Clay County, Missouri
Jacob Whitmer	27 January 1800 (Age 29)	Harrisburg, Pennsylvania	Shoemaker	21 April 1856 Richmond, Missouri
Peter Whitmer, Jr.	27 September 1809 (Age 19)	Fayette, New York	Tailor	22 September 1836 Clay County, Missouri
John Whitmer	27 August 1809 (Age 20)	Harrisburg, Pennsylvania	Farmer	11 July 1878 Far West, Missouri
Hiram Page	c. 1800 (Age 29)	Vermont	Physician	12 August 1852 Excelsior Springs, Missouri
Joseph Smith, Sr.	12 July 1771 (Age 58)	Topsfield, Massachusetts	Farmer, schoolteacher	14 September 1840 Nauvoo, Illinois
Hyrum Smith	9 February 1800 (Age 29)	Tunbridge, Vermont	Farmer, schoolteacher	27 June 1844 Carthage, Illinois
Samuel H. Smith	13 March 1808 (Age 21)	Tunbridge, Vermont	Farmer	27 July 1844 Nauvoo, Illinois

== Others ==
Mary Musselman Whitmer (1778–1856), the mother of five of the witnesses, who took care of the household in Fayette, New York where much of the translation occurred, said that an angel showed her the plates and thus made her more content to continue her daily labors. Joseph Smith made no mention of this visitation in his journal.

Several other people close to Smith, often family members or neighbors, claimed to have handled the plates without seeing them, usually lifting or feeling them while they were wrapped in a cloth covering or pillowcase. According to these people, the plates were about six by eight inches wide, four to six inches thick, with metallic leaves that were pliable like tin. They were heavier than wood or stone, with estimates of their weight ranging from forty to sixty pounds.

== Responses ==
=== Criticism ===
Critics of the Latter Day Saint movement—from late nineteenth-century clergymen to Mark Twain to modern agnostics, evangelical Christians, and even some unorthodox ("Big Tent") Mormons—argue that the testimonies of the witnesses cannot be taken at face value.

- According to Grant H. Palmer, the Book of Mormon witnesses had a "nineteenth-century magical mindset" rather than "a rationalist perspective." They believed in what was called "second sight. Traditionally, this included the ability to see spirits and their dwelling places within the local hills and elsewhere." A number of the witnesses possessed and used seer stones; Oliver Cowdery was a rodsman. As Tufts University professor John L. Brooke has observed, many of the earliest Mormons were "very much attuned to the supernatural powers of witchcraft." "Far removed from our own modern empiricism, the world view of the witnesses is difficult for us to grasp," and thus it is less impressive that "three signatories to the Book of Mormon saw and heard an angel."
- All the witnesses were family, close friends, or financial backers of Joseph Smith. Cowdery, Page, and the five Whitmers were related by marriage. Mark Twain later joked, "I could not feel more satisfied and at rest if the entire Whitmer family had testified."
- Although Harris continued to testify to the truth of the Book of Mormon even when he was estranged from the church, at least during the early years of the movement, he "seems to have repeatedly admitted the internal, subjective nature of his visionary experience."

=== Apologetics ===
- LDS church leaders and student manuals note that none of the witnesses ever denied his testimony as it was printed in the Book of Mormon nor denied that Smith was a true prophet at the time he translated the book.
- Apologists note that after being excommunicated, Harris and Cowdery later returned to the church.

== See also ==
- Reformed Egyptian
