= Hiram Page =

Book of Mormon witness

Personal details
- Born: c. 1800; Vermont, U.S.
- Died: August 12, 1852; Excelsior Springs, Missouri, U.S.
- Resting place: Hamers Farm; 39.356045°N 94.176267°W
- Known For: One of the Eight Witnesses
- Spouse(s): Catherine Whitmer
- Children: 9

Hiram Page (c. 1800 – August 12, 1852) was an early member of the Latter Day Saint movement and one of the Eight Witnesses to the Book of Mormon's golden plates.

== Early life ==
Page was born in Vermont. Earlier in his life, he studied medicine which he practiced during his travels throughout New York and Canada. On November 10, 1825, Page married Catherine Whitmer, daughter of Peter Whitmer Sr. and Mary Musselman. The two had nine children together: John, Elizabeth, Philander, Mary, Peter, Nancy, Hiram, Oliver, and Kate.

== Early involvement in the Latter Day Saint movement ==
Page became one of the Eight Witnesses during June 1829.

He and Catherine were baptized into in the Church of Christ (later renamed the Church of Jesus Christ of Latter Day Saints) on April 11, 1830, by Oliver Cowdery. On June 9, he was ordained a teacher in the church, one of the church's first twelve officers.

=== Seer stone and revelations ===
Page was living with his in-laws the Whitmers in Fayette, New York. Joseph Smith Jr. arrived in August 1830 to discover Page using a black "seerstone" to produce revelations for the church. The revelations were regarding the organization and location of Zion. Cowdery and the Whitmer family believed the revelations were authentic. In response, Smith announced in a new revelation during the church's September conference that Page's revelations were of the devil (Doctrine and Covenants, Section 28:11). At the conference there was considerable discussion on the topic. Page agreed to discard the stone and the revelations and join in following Smith as the sole revelator for the church. The members present confirmed this unanimously with a vote. The fate of the stone and revelations was not recorded by contemporary sources and has been the subject of interest ever since. Martin Harris's brother Emer stated second-hand in 1856 that the stone was ground to powder and the associated revelations were burned. Apostle Alvin R. Dyer stated that he had discovered Page's seerstone in 1955, that it had been passed down through Jacob Whitmer's family. The validity of this claim has been questioned.

=== Migration to Ohio and Missouri ===
In January 1831, Page accompanied Lucy Mack Smith and a company of saints from Waterloo, New York, to Buffalo on the Erie Canal, on their way to Fairport and Kirtland, Ohio. In May 1831, Page moved his family to Thompson, Ohio, under Lucy Mack Smith's direction. He again moved his family to Jackson County, Missouri, in 1832 and joined the Latter Day Saints gathering there. With the other Whitmers, they formed a cluster of ten or twelve homes called the "Whitmer Settlement". Hiram owned 120 acres (490,000 m^{2}) of land in the area.

During the growing anti-Mormon hostilities in Jackson County, Page was severely beaten by a group of non-Mormon vigilantes on October 31, 1833. On July 31 and August 6, 1834, he testified to the facts of the beatings. By 1834, Page and his family were expelled from the county along with the other Latter Day Saints, and lived for a time in neighboring Clay County, before moving to Far West.

== Schism with Joseph Smith and later life ==
When the members of the Whitmer family were excommunicated from the church in 1838, Page withdrew from church fellowship. One historian summarizes the situation as follows:

As a result of these events, Hiram became estranged from mainstream Mormonism. Though there is no evidence of excommunication or withdrawal of his [preaching] license, after 1838 there is no record of Page's association with the main body of the church. Hiram continued residence in the Richmond, [Ray County] area until his death in 1852. Catherine gave birth to four more children, the last being born in the year that Hiram died.

On September 6, 1847, William E. McLellin baptized Page, David Whitmer, John Whitmer, and Jacob Whitmer into his newly formed Church of Christ (Whitmerite). McLellin ordained Page a high priest in the church. Page participated in the subsequent ordinations of the others.

Page died on the farm he had bought in Excelsior Springs, in Ray County, still affirming his testimony of the reality of the gold plates and the divinity of the Book of Mormon. His death was caused when his wagon overturned, crushing him underneath.

== Grave location ==
For almost 150 years, the final resting place of Page was unknown. However, in 2000, it was located near Excelsior Springs, on property purchased by Charles and Molly Fulkerson in 1917. Page's burial location was the last of the 11 Book of Mormon witnesses to be identified. A commemorative marker was placed on Page's grave on April 27, 2002.
