= Ziba Peterson =

American Latter Day Saint missionary (died 1849)

Ziba Peterson (died 1849) was an early American Latter Day Saint best known as one of the four initial missionaries sent by Joseph Smith in 1830 to preach to Native Americans in Indian Territory. This mission brought in several influential converts and introduced the church to Kirtland, Ohio and Jackson County, Missouri, which would become religiously significant to Mormonism.

== Biography ==
Peterson was baptized into the Church of Christ by Oliver Cowdery on April 18, 1830 in Seneca Lake, New York. By June 1830 he had been ordained an elder. Peterson was one of six elders attending the church's first conference on June 9, 1830.

=== Mission ===
Peterson was called as a missionary to the Native Americans (referred to as Lamanites by early members of the Church) in Indian Territory with Parley P. Pratt, Oliver Cowdery and Peter Whitmer, and left Fayette, New York on October 17, 1830. On this journey, they went through Kirtland, Ohio where they met a Reformed Baptist pastor friend of Pratt's, Sidney Rigdon. From their preaching, about 50 converts were baptized, including Rigdon, who became an important early leader of the Latter Day Saints. This early success in Kirtland led it to become a crucial gathering place for early Mormons, the headquarters of the church, and the place of the church's first temple.

Peterson and the other missionaries continued to Jackson County, Missouri, on the borders of Indian Territory, where they established a tailor shop and baptized about 40 or 50 settlers. Joseph Smith would eventually come to Jackson County in 1831 and identify it as the place where Zion, or the New Jerusalem, would be built.

While still in Missouri, Smith delivered a revelation that included a reprimand of Peterson for unspecified sins. Days later, on August 4, 1831, in public at a conference of the church, Peterson was again reprimanded and he confessed his transgression. Peterson's missionary call and reprimand are both recorded in the Doctrine and Covenants, a book of Latter Day Saint scripture, in sections 32 and 58.

=== Later life ===
He married Rebecca Hopper on August 11, 1831, with whom he would have eight children. The Hopper family had been among the converts baptized by Peterson and the other missionaries in Jackson County.

Peterson was reordained an elder by Lyman Wight on October 2, 1832, but when the church was driven out of Jackson County in 1833, Peterson stayed and left the Church. He and his family left for California on May 3, 1848, arriving in Dry Diggins (Placerville), California in October 1848, where he was elected sheriff. His hanging of three outlaws earned Dry Diggins the nickname "Hangtown." Peterson died in 1849.

== Citations ==
- Saints:History of the LDS Church Ch 9 Come Life or Come Death (and Ch 10)
- Garrett, H. Dean (Spring 1997). "Ziba Peterson: From Missionary to Hanging Sheriff" (PDF). Nauvoo Journal. 9: 28–32.
