= Samuel H. Smith (Latter Day Saints) =

American religious leader (1808–1844)

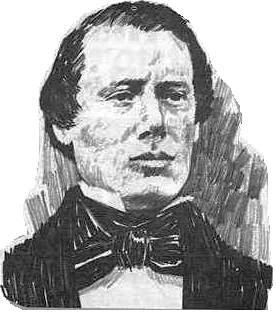

Personal details
- Born: March 13, 1808; Tunbridge, Vermont, US
- Died: July 30, 1844 (aged 36); Nauvoo, Illinois, US
- Resting place: Smith Family Cemetery; 40°32′25.98″N 91°23′31.06″W
- Spouse(s): Mary Bailey (1834–41); Levira Clark (1841–44)
- Children: 7
- Parents: Joseph Smith, Sr. Lucy Mack Smith

Samuel Harrison Smith (13 March 1808 – 30 July 1844) was a younger brother of Joseph Smith, founder of the Latter Day Saint movement. Samuel was a leader in his own right and a successful missionary. Smith is commonly regarded as the first Latter Day Saint missionary following the organization of the Church of Christ by his brother, Joseph. One of the Eight Witnesses to the Book of Mormon's golden plates, Samuel Smith remained devoted to his church throughout his life.

== Early life ==
Born in Tunbridge, Vermont, to Joseph Smith Sr., and Lucy Mack Smith, Samuel moved with his family to western New York by the 1820s. When Smith's father missed a mortgage payment on the family farm on the outskirts of Manchester Township, near Palmyra, a local Quaker named Lemuel Durfee purchased the land and allowed the Smiths to continue to live there in exchange for Samuel's labor at Durfee's store.

== Book of Mormon witness and church establishment ==
On May 25, 1829, Smith became the third person baptized as a Latter Day Saint. Smith was baptized by Oliver Cowdery, who had become the first baptized Latter Day Saint on May 15, 1829 (Joseph Smith had been baptized immediately after Cowdery).

At the end of June 1829, Samuel, along with his brother Hyrum, his father, and several men of the Peter Whitmer Sr. family, signed a joint statement declaring their testimony of the golden plates that Joseph Smith said he translated into the Book of Mormon. The witnesses stated that "we did handle [the golden plates] with our hands; and we also saw the engravings thereon". This "Testimony of the Eight Witnesses" was printed as the final page of the Book of Mormon and is still included in the preface of most current editions.

Smith became one of the first six members of the Church of Christ when it was formally organized on April 6, 1830.

== Latter Day Saint missionary ==
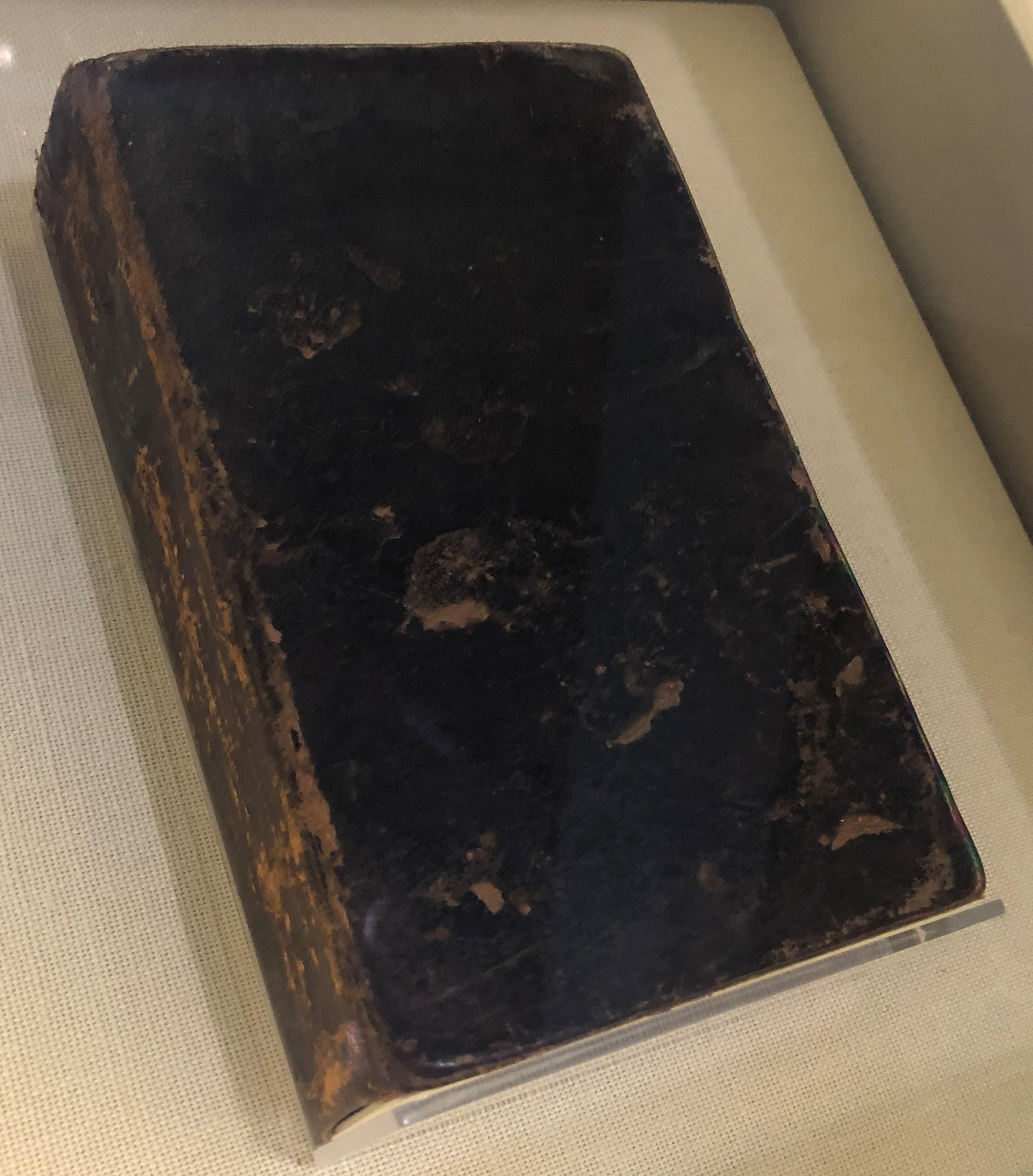
Book of Mormon given by Samuel H. Smith that ended up with Brigham Young

At the next church conference, Smith was ordained one of the church's earliest elders. Smith was a successful missionary and served a number of missions. His first mission involved going to Mendon, New York, where he gave John P. Greene a copy of the Book of Mormon, which not only led to Greene joining the church, but also Greene's brother-in-law, Brigham Young.

In December 1830, Smith went on a mission to Kirtland, Ohio, to follow up on the success Cowdery and Parley P. Pratt had teaching there. Smith later went on a mission with Reynolds Cahoon in which they traveled to Missouri in 1831. During this mission they taught and baptized William E. McLellin. This mission also involved some of the first Latter Day Saint missionary work in Indiana, involving preaching at Unionville, Madison and Vienna.

In June 1832, Smith and Orson Hyde were the first Latter Day Saint missionaries to preach in Connecticut. During the same month, Smith and Hyde went to Boston. As a result of their efforts, branches were established in both Boston and New Rowley, Massachusetts. In July 1832, Smith and Hyde went to Providence, Rhode Island; they baptized two people, but in response to threats of violence left the state after being there only twelve days. In September 1832, Smith and Hyde were the first Latter Day Saint missionaries to preach in Maine. On this 1832 mission, Smith and Hyde also baptized people in Spafford, New York.

== High council and other church service ==
When the first high council of the church—at the time the chief judicial and legislative body of the church—was organized on February 17, 1834, Smith was one of twelve men chosen as a member. Later that year, Smith married Mary Bailey, his first wife, with whom he had four children.

In 1835, Smith was made a general agent for the firm in charge of publishing a Latter Day Saint hymnal and school books for children, thus working closely with Emma Smith and W. W. Phelps.

Smith moved with his family to Far West, Missouri, in 1838 and took part in the subsequent Mormon War that took place in northwestern Missouri that year. At the Battle of Crooked River, Smith fought next to apostle David W. Patten, who subsequently died from wounds received in the skirmish. As a result of the conflict, the Latter Day Saints were expelled from Missouri and Smith moved with the main body to their new headquarters in Nauvoo, Illinois. Due to his role in the Battle of Crooked River, Smith fled Missouri almost immediately, along with Lorenzo D. Young, Benjamin L. Clapp and Charles C. Rich.

In 1839 Smith settled in the general vicinity of Macomb, Illinois.

Smith's wife, Mary, died in Nauvoo in 1841 and he married Lavira Clark later that year. Smith and Lavira had three children together.

== Death ==
Smith's brothers, Joseph and Hyrum, were killed by a mob on June 27, 1844, while being held in Carthage Jail, in Illinois. Samuel was attacked by mobbers, while traveling toward Carthage after hearing rumors of trouble, and is said to have developed some kind of stitch in his side evading them, which may have contributed to his subsequent death. After evading the mobbers, he traveled to the jail (said to have been the first Latter-day Saint after the mobbers left), and retrieved his brothers' bodies. Some church members assumed that Samuel would succeed Joseph as the president of the Latter Day Saint church (see lineal succession (Latter Day Saints)). However, Samuel fell ill shortly after their deaths and died just one month later.

Smith's official cause of death was "bilious fever", which is an archaic and inexact term for any disease accompanied by a fever and the evacuation of bile, such as typhoid fever or malaria. Lucy Mack Smith later suggested Smith had become ill because of the fatigue and shock occasioning by his experience of the death of his brothers. Smith's brother, William, later stated that he had good reason to believe that Smith was poisoned by Hosea Stout on orders from Brigham Young and Willard Richards. In a meeting on July 10, 1844, Smith had been in a meeting with Richards in which Smith reminded the group that he was Joseph's designee as president if both Joseph and Hyrum had died. Richards, however, had wanted to delay the decision on succession until Brigham Young and other prominent missionaries had returned to Nauvoo.

Hosea Stout was suspected in part because, as reported by Smith's wife, Stout had been administering a white powder to Smith daily as treatment for his illness. Smith's mother does not appear to have considered him to have been murdered, and though his sole remaining brother, William Smith, later charged Richards and Stout with foul play, he did not bring forward his own evidence in support of that accusation until 1892. William Smith's charges were not pursued by legal authorities.

== See also ==
- Latter Day Saint martyrs

== Notes ==
This article cites Jon Krakauer as a source for historical facts. Jon Krakauer is not a historian, but a fiction writer; his writings should not be taken as historical facts.
