= Eight Witnesses =

Early members of the Latter Day Saint movement

The Eight Witnesses

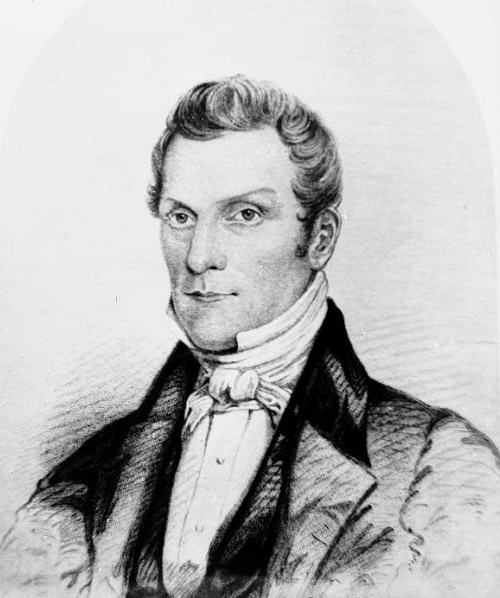
Hyrum Smith

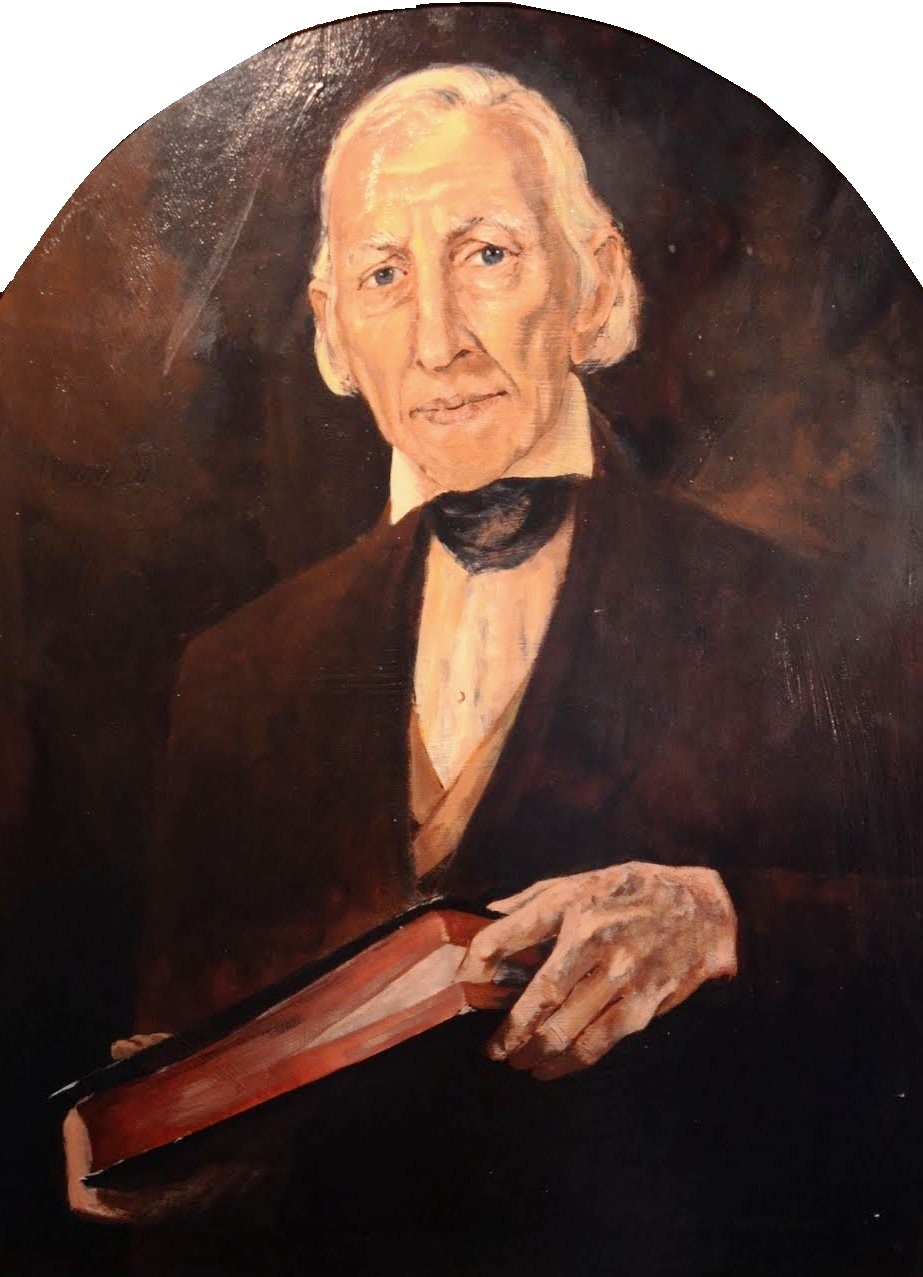
Joseph Smith Sr.

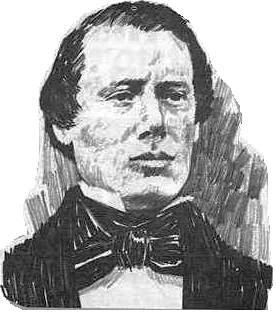
Samuel H. Smith

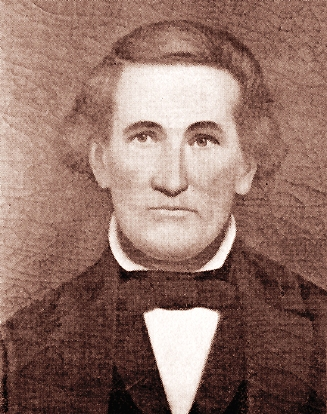
Jacob Whitmer

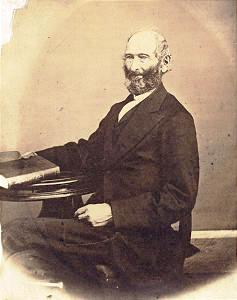
John Whitmer

(not shown: Hiram Page, Christian Whitmer, and Peter Whitmer Jr.)

The Eight Witnesses were one of the two groups of witnesses who made statements stating that they had seen the golden plates which Joseph Smith said was his source material for the Book of Mormon. An earlier group of witnesses who said they had seen the plates were called the Three Witnesses.

== Testimony ==
The Testimony of Eight Witnesses was first published at the end of the 1830 edition of the Book of Mormon and has been printed in nearly every edition since, although most subsequent editions moved the statement to the front of the book and included minor grammatical corrections.

Be it known unto all nations, kindreds, tongues, and people, unto whom this work shall come: That Joseph Smith, Jr., the translator of this work, has shewn unto us the plates of which hath been spoken, which have the appearance of gold; and as many of the leaves as the said Smith has translated we did handle with our hands; and we also saw the engravings thereon, all of which has the appearance of ancient work, and of curious workmanship. And this we bear record with words of soberness, that the said Smith has shewn unto us, for we have seen and hefted, and know of a surety that the said Smith has got the plates of which we have spoken. And we give our names unto the world, to witness unto the world that which we have seen. And we lie not, God bearing witness of it.

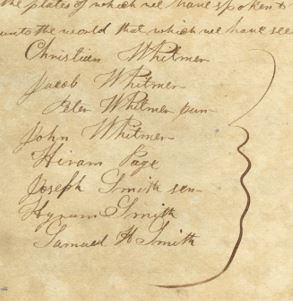
Photograph of the names of the Eight Witnesses to the Book of Mormon, as written by Oliver Cowdery

Christian Whitmer

Jacob Whitmer

Peter Whitmer, Jr.

John Whitmer

Hiram Page

Joseph Smith, Sen.

Hyrum Smith

Samuel H. Smith

Unlike the Three Witnesses, the Eight testified that they both saw and handled the plates. Another difference is that the Eight testified that they were shown the plates by Joseph Smith rather than by an angel as had the Three Witnesses.

== Setting ==
Toward the end of June 1829, at the Peter Whitmer Sr. home in Fayette, New York, Joseph Smith (with Oliver Cowdery as scribe) finished the translation of the Book of Mormon. Near the end of translation process, a prophecy was translated from the Second Book of Nephi that three, and "a few" others, might see the golden plates. Subsequently, on June 28, 1829, near the Whitmer farm, the Three Witnesses had their experience. Thereafter, the Smith and Whitmer families traveled to the Joseph Smith, Sr. home in Palmyra, New York. On July 2, 1829, near the Smith home, the Eight Witnesses said that they saw and handled the golden plates.

== About the witnesses ==
The Eight Witnesses were all members of the Whitmer or Smith families: Christian Whitmer, Jacob Whitmer, Peter Whitmer Jr., John Whitmer, Hiram Page, Joseph Smith Sr., Hyrum Smith, and Samuel H. Smith. Joseph Smith Sr. was Joseph Smith's father, and Hyrum and Samuel were his brothers. Christian, Jacob, Peter Jr. and John were David Whitmer's brothers, and Hiram Page was his brother-in-law.

=== Split with Smith ===
In 1838, the living members of Whitmer family (Christian Whitmer and Peter Whitmer Jr. died in 1835 and 1836, respectively) became estranged from Smith during a leadership struggle in Far West, Missouri, and all were excommunicated along with other dissenters and fled Caldwell County after receiving an ultimatum from the Danites. Following the death of Smith, none of the Whitmers joined the group that was led by Brigham Young and would become the Church of Jesus Christ of Latter-day Saints.

Yet despite the estrangement of the Whitmer family, there is little evidence that any of the Eight Witnesses denied his testimony to the authenticity of the Book of Mormon or the gold plates. However, one source, the former Mormon leader Stephen Burnett, said in 1838 that Martin Harris had told him that "the eight witnesses never saw [the plates] & hesitated to sign that instrument for that reason, but were persuaded to do it."

== See also ==
- Reformed Egyptian
- Mary Whitmer
