= Christian Whitmer =

Witness of the Book of Mormon's golden plates

Personal details
- Born: January 18, 1798; Dauphin, Pennsylvania, United States
- Died: November 27, 1835 (aged 37); Clay County, Missouri
- Known For: One of the Eight Witnesses
- Spouse(s): Ann Schott
- Parents: Peter Whitmer, Sr. Mary Musselman

Christian Whitmer (January 18, 1798 – November 27, 1835) was the eldest son of Peter Whitmer, Sr. and Mary Musselman. He is primarily remembered as one of the Eight Witnesses of the Book of Mormon's golden plates.

== Biography ==
Born in Dauphin, Pennsylvania, Whitmer moved with his parents to New York in 1809. On February 22, 1825, he married Ann Schott (1801–1866) in Fayette, New York. In June 1829 he possibly assisted Joseph Smith with the translation of a few pages of the Book of Mormon by acting as his scribe. That same month, Joseph Smith showed Whitmer, along with several of his brothers, the gold plates; Whitmer subsequently signed a declaration of the Eight Witnesses. On April 11, 1830, he and Ann were baptized into the newly organized Church of Christ. Upon its organization, Whitmer was made a teacher in the church. They subsequently moved to Jackson County, Missouri, where Whitmer was appointed a leading elder of the church.

By 1835, Whitmer and his family had relocated to the new Latter Day Saint settlement of Far West, Missouri, where Whitmer was a member of the high council. He died there on November 27, 1835, leaving no children. His widow, Ann, eventually returned to Fayette.
