= Three Witnesses =

Early members of the Latter Day Saint movement

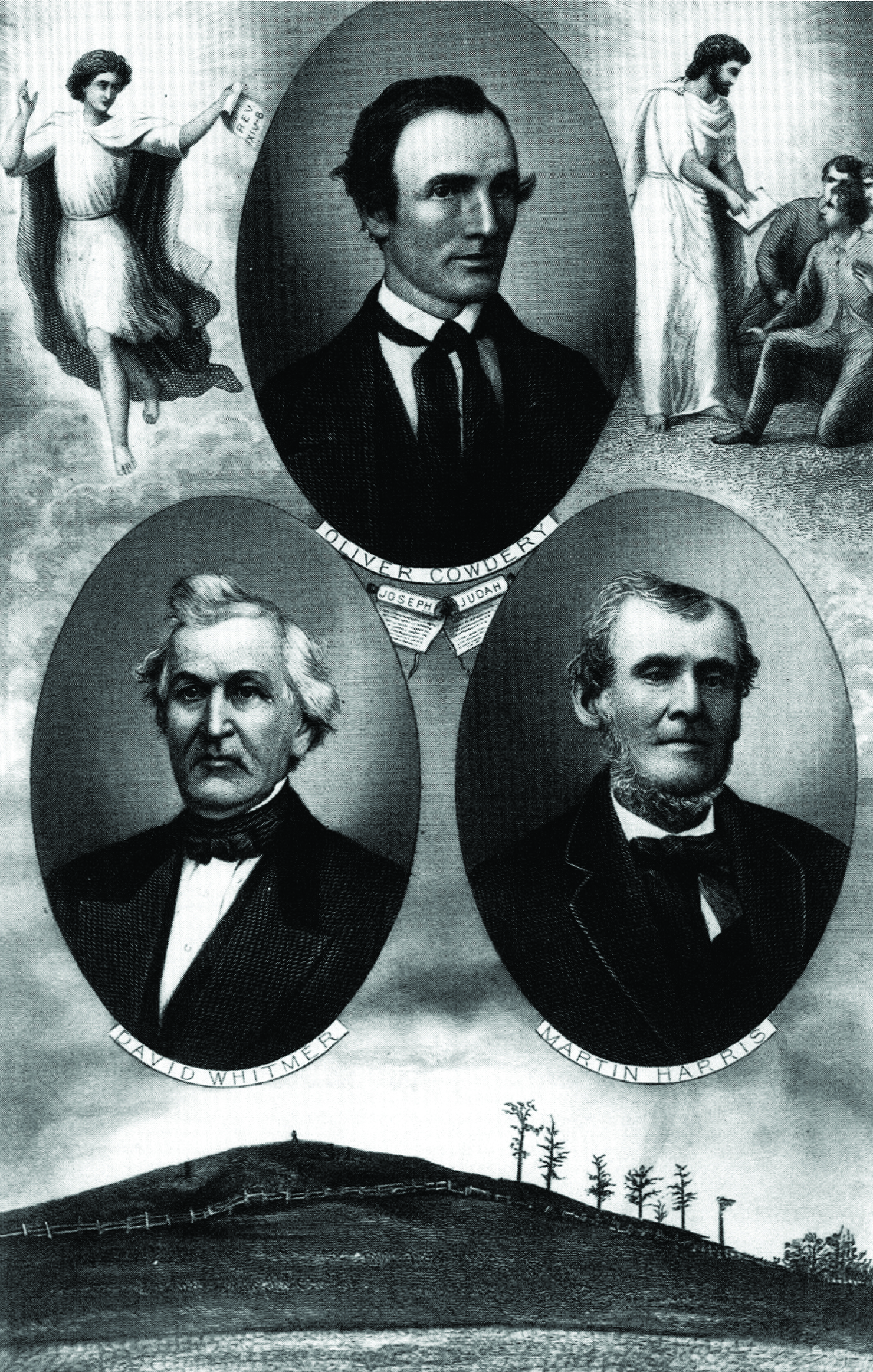
The Three Witnesses as depicted by Edward Hart, 1883: Oliver Cowdery (top), David Whitmer (left), and Martin Harris (right)

The Three Witnesses is the collective name for three men—Oliver Cowdery, David Whitmer and Martin Harris—in the early Latter Day Saint movement who stated that an angel showed them the golden plates from which Joseph Smith translated the Book of Mormon. They also stated that they heard God's voice, informing them that the book had been translated by divine power.

Their joint statement, along with the Eight Witnesses statement, has appeared in every edition of the Book of Mormon since its publication in 1830. They are collectively known as the Book of Mormon witnesses.

All three men eventually broke with Smith’s church, although Harris and Cowdery were later rebaptized into the church after Smith's death. Whitmer founded his own Church of Christ. All three men upheld their testimony of the Book of Mormon at their deaths.

== Testimony and early role in the movement ==
The Three Witnesses were early adherents to the Latter Day Saint movement, and had aided Joseph Smith's translation of the Book of Mormon through various means: Harris made a significant financial contribution to the printing of the Book of Mormon; Oliver Cowdery served as a scribe, while the Whitmer family home hosted the translation, at the request of Cowdery.

On June 28, 1829, Joseph Smith and the three men went into the woods near the home of Peter Whitmer Sr. and prayed to receive a vision of the golden plates. After some time, Harris left the other three men, believing his presence had prevented the vision from occurring. The remaining three again knelt and said they soon saw a light in the air overhead and an angel holding the golden plates. Smith then went after Harris, and after praying at some length with him, Harris said he also saw the vision.

The three men provided a single written statement titled "Testimony of Three Witnesses", published at the end of the first edition of the Book of Mormon:

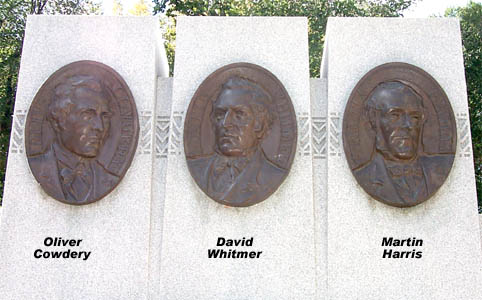
Three Witnesses Monument, by Avard Fairbanks

Be it known unto all nations, kindreds, tongues, and people, unto whom this work shall come: That we, through the grace of God the Father, and our Lord Jesus Christ, have seen the plates which contain this record, which is a record of the people of Nephi, and also of the Lamanites, his brethren, and also of the people of Jared, who came from the tower of which hath been spoken. And we also know that they have been translated by the gift and power of God, for his voice hath declared it unto us; wherefore we know of a surety that the work is true. And we also testify that we have seen the engravings which are upon the plates; and they have been shewn unto us by the power of God, and not of man. And we declare with words of soberness, that an angel of God came down from heaven, and he brought and laid before our eyes, that we beheld and saw the plates, and the engravings thereon; and we know that it is by the grace of God the Father, and our Lord Jesus Christ, that we beheld and bear record that these things are true. And it is marvellous in our eyes. Nevertheless, the voice of the Lord commanded us that we should bear record of it; wherefore, to be obedient unto the commandments of God, we bear testimony of these things. And we know that if we are faithful in Christ, we shall rid our garments of the blood of all men, and be found spotless before the judgment-seat of Christ, and shall dwell with him eternally in the heavens. And the honor be to the Father, and to the Son, and to the Holy Ghost, which is one God. Amen.

The testimony was moved to the beginning of the Book of Mormon in later editions, with standardized spelling.

== Oliver Cowdery ==
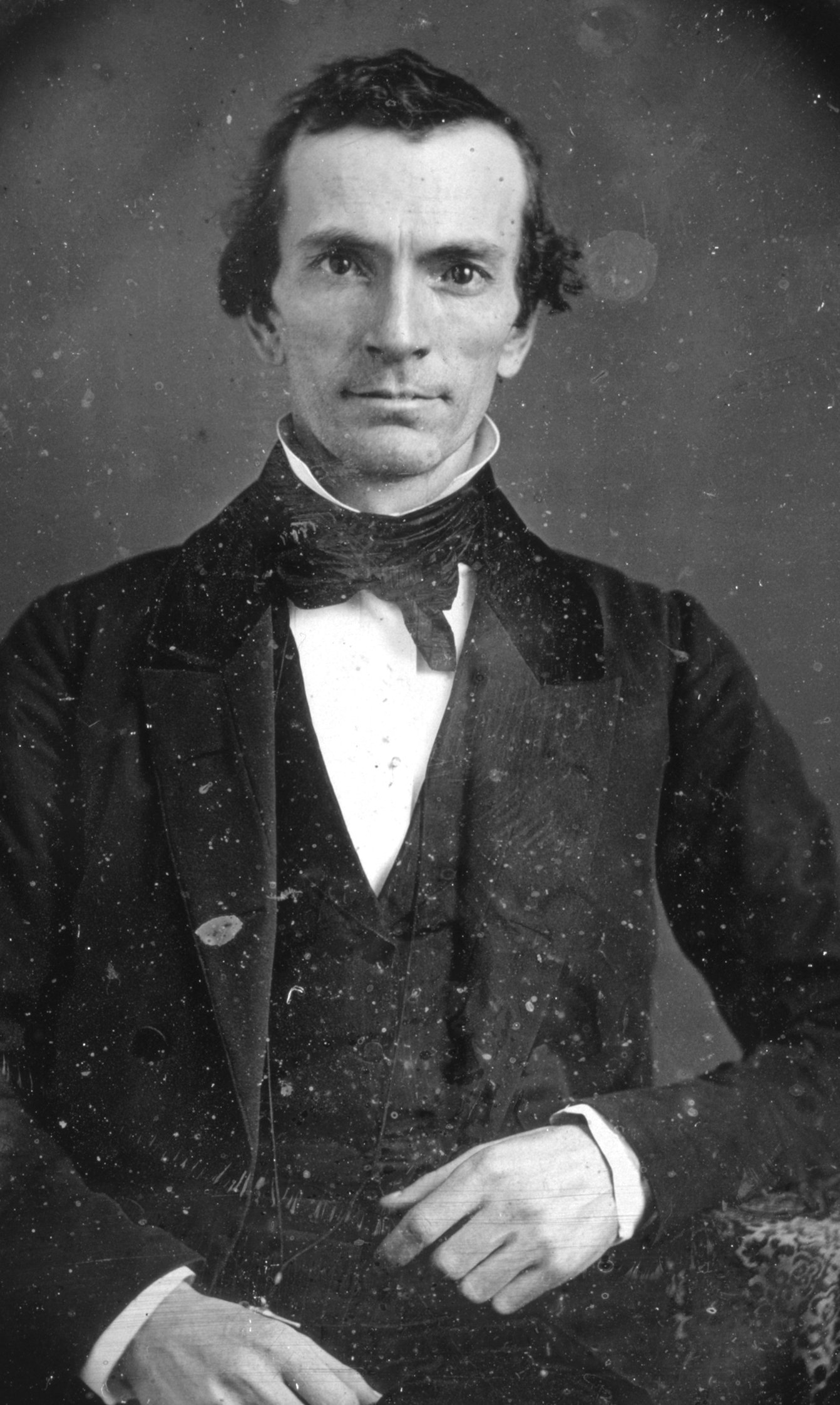
Oliver Cowdery

=== Early association with Smith ===
Oliver Cowdery was a schoolteacher and an early convert to Mormonism who served as scribe while Smith dictated the Book of Mormon.

Cowdery had been offered a teaching position in the Palmyra area in 1828. Cowdery rented a room from Joseph Smith Sr. and Lucy Mack Smith, possibly because of fellow teacher Hyrum Smith’s connection with the teacher’s committee.

In early 1829, his growing interest in the stories circulating about the golden plates led him to "deep study all day, and it had been put into [his] heart that [he] would have the privilege of writing for Joseph." Cowdery left Palmyra for Harmony, Pennsylvania in spring of 1829 to meet Joseph Smith, stopping in Fayette to meet with his long-time friend, David Whitmer. Cowdery would write several letters to Whitmer to report on the translation. He eventually requested to use the Whitmer family home to finish the translation.

Cowdery wrote down the dictation of the Book of Mormon in about three months; additionally, he would copy nearly the entire manuscript to prepare for publication later that fall.

Cowdery would later recount that he had experienced two other important visions before his Three Witness testimony; Cowdery said that he and Smith were ordained by laying of hands by John the Baptist in May 1829, after which they had baptized each other in the Susquehanna River. Later that year, Cowdery and Smith had gone into the forest and prayed "until a glorious light encircled us, and as we arose on account of the light, three persons stood before us dressed in white, their faces beaming with glory." They identified the three persons as apostles Peter, James and John, who similarly ordained them to the Melchizedek priesthood.

Cowdery, like Joseph Smith, was also a treasure hunter who had used a divining rod in his youth. Cowdery asked questions of the rod: if it moved, the answer was yes; if not, no. Cowdery also told Smith that he had seen the golden plates in a vision before the two ever met.

=== Kirtland and Missouri ===
Shortly after the publication of the Book of Mormon, Cowdery was instrumental in the nascent church’s missionary efforts. In 1830, Cowdery and Parley P. Pratt were called to serve a mission primarily aimed at Native Americans, which expanded the church into areas like Kirtland and Jackson County. Cowdery settled in Jackson County in 1831, but moved to Kirtland after the 1833 expulsion of the Mormons from the county.

In Kirtland, he served as the editor of the church's newspaper, Messenger and Advocate, and was ordained Assistant President of the Church, a largely ceremonial role. In 1835, Cowdery was designated to serve a mission to Canada.

=== Split with Smith ===
By 1838, Cowdery and Smith had a number of disagreements, including doctrinal differences about the role of faith and works, the Kirtland Safety Society, and what Cowdery called Smith's "dirty, nasty, filthy affair" with Fanny Alger. Smith's growing reliance on Sidney Rigdon as his first counselor and differences over the management of finances and land in Missouri and Kirtland. Nine excommunication charges were brought against him in April, but Cowdery refused to attend the disciplinary session. Cowdery also refused a high council decision that he not sell lands in Jackson County.

After Cowdery's excommunication on April 12, 1838, he taught school, practiced law, and became involved in Ohio political affairs. He joined the Methodist church in Tiffin, Ohio. He was chosen as editor for the Democratic paper in Seneca County, a position he lost as his association with Mormonism was discovered.

After moving to Wisconsin, he was nominated for the state assembly, a race which he narrowly lost. His role in early Mormonism was hotly debated during the campaign; however, the Democrats upheld and defended Cowdery’s nomination, arguing he was "a man of sterling integrity, sound and vigorous intellect, and in every way worthy, honest and capable."

==== Rebaptism ====
Later, Cowdery showed willingness to reconcile with the church. After offering in 1842 to assist in the legal defense of John Snyder, a Mormon convert arrested in New Orleans, he would engage in correspondence with the Quorum of the Twelve. He expressed "no unkindly feelings" towards them, but insisted on having his charges cleared before reconciling completely. Confident that he would be exonerated of any false charges, he wrote, "I am fully, doubly, satisfied, that all will be right—that my character will be fully vindicated."

In 1844, after hearing of Smith's assassination, William Lang, an attorney who worked with Cowdery, recalled he "immediately took the paper over to his house to read to his wife. On his return to the office we had a long conversation on the subject, and I was surprised to hear him speak with so much kindness of a man that had so wronged him as Smith had." After years of exchanging letters with church leaders, Cowdery requested to be readmitted to the church. He never held another high office in the church, in part because he died sixteen months after his rebaptism.

== David Whitmer ==
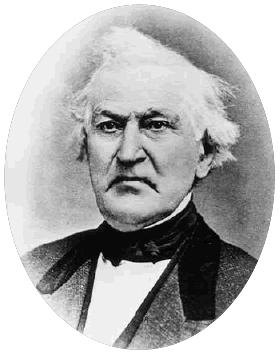
David Whitmer

David Whitmer first became involved with Joseph Smith and the golden plates through his friend, Cowdery, and became the most interviewed of the Three Witnesses because of his longevity.

In 1831, Whitmer moved with early Mormons to Kirtland, Ohio. In 1832, he was one of the earliest Mormon settlers in Jackson County, Missouri, and was named "President of the Church in Missouri", where he would often be at odds with Smith.

By December 1837, a movement led by Warren Parrish plotted to overthrow Smith and replace him with Whitmer. After the collapse of the Kirtland Bank, confrontation grew between the dissenters and those loyal to Smith. Whitmer, his brother John, Cowdery, and others were harassed by the Danites, a group of Mormon vigilantes, and were warned to leave the county. Whitmer was formally excommunicated on April 13, 1838, his main charge being "possessing the same spirit as the dissenters", and never rejoined the church.

Whitmer continued to affirm his testimony of the Book of Mormon, though he considered Joseph Smith a fallen prophet. He settled in Richmond, Missouri, where he ran a livery stable. In 1858, he was selected as city councilman, and in 1867 was elected to fill an unexpired term of mayor—but refused nomination for a full term, instead recommending the election of a "younger, more energetic man". When anti-Mormon lecturer Clark Braden came to town and publicly branded him as disreputable, the Richmond Conservator responded with a front-page editorial:

"the forty six years of private citizenship on the part of David Whitmer, in Richmond, without stain or blemish"

After Smith's death, Whitmer briefly organized his own church in 1847, which was quickly dissolved. He reorganized it in 1870, and in 1887, Whitmer published "An Address to All Believers in Christ" (1887), where he reaffirmed his witness to the golden plates, but he also criticized Smith, including the introduction of plural marriage. "If you believe my testimony to the Book of Mormon, if you believe that God spake to us three witnesses by his own voice," wrote Whitmer, "then I tell you that in June, 1838, God spake to me again by his own voice from the heavens, and told me to 'separate myself from among the Latter Day Saints, for as they sought to do unto me, should it be done unto them.'"

Whitmer was frequently visited by all sorts of people, and in the latter years of his life, by newspaper representatives especially, who came to inquire concerning his testimony. In his famous recounting to Orson Pratt in 1878, Whitmer claimed to have seen not only the golden plates but the Brass Plates, "... the sword of Laban, the Directors and the Interpreters." On other occasions, Whitmer's vision of the plates seemed less corporeal. James Henry Moyle, a young Mormon lawyer, interviewed Whitmer in 1885 and asked if there was any possibility that Whitmer had been deceived. "His answer was unequivocal ... that he saw the plates and heard the angel with unmistakable clearness." But Moyle went away "not fully satisfied .... It was more spiritual than I anticipated."

=== John Murphy incident ===
When asked in 1880 for a description of the angel who showed him the plates, reporter John Murphy stated Whitmer said the angel "had no appearance or shape." Asked how he then could bear testimony that he had seen and heard an angel, Whitmer allegedly replied, "Have you never had impressions?" To which the interviewer responded, "Then you had impressions as the Quaker when the spirit moves, or as a good Methodist in giving a happy experience, a feeling?" "Just so," replied Whitmer.

Whitmer responded by publishing a “Proclamation”, claiming he felt misrepresented by Murphy and that had never modified nor denied his written testimony. He also enlisted twenty-two of Richmond's political, business and professional leaders to sign an accompanying statement that they had known him for over forty years as "a man of the highest integrity, and of undoubted truth and veracity."

== Martin Harris ==
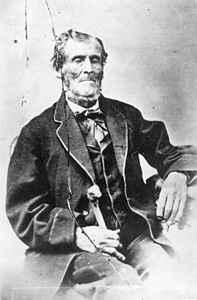
Martin Harris

Martin Harris was a respected farmer in the Palmyra area who had investigated several religions before he became a Latter Day Saint. A biographer wrote that his "imagination was excitable and fecund." One letter says that Harris thought that a candle sputtering was the work of the devil and that he had met Jesus in the shape of a deer and walked and talked with him for two or three miles. The local Presbyterian minister called him "a visionary fanatic." A friend, who praised Harris as "universally esteemed as an honest man" but disagreed with his religious affiliation, declared that Harris's mind "was overbalanced by 'marvellousness'" and that his belief in earthly visitations of angels and ghosts gave him the local reputation of being crazy. Another friend said, "Martin was a good citizen. Martin was a man that would do just as he agreed with you. But, he was a great man for seeing spooks."

During the early years, Harris "seems to have repeatedly admitted the internal, subjective nature of his visionary experience." The foreman in the Palmyra printing office that produced the first Book of Mormon said that Harris "used to practice a good deal of his characteristic jargon and 'seeing with the spiritual eye,' and the like." John H. Gilbert, the typesetter for most of the Book of Mormon, said that he had asked Harris, "Martin, did you see those plates with your naked eyes?" According to Gilbert, Harris "looked down for an instant, raised his eyes up, and said, 'No, I saw them with a spiritual eye." Two other Palmyra residents said that Harris told them that he had seen the plates with "the eye of faith" or "spiritual eyes." In 1838, Harris is said to have told an Ohio congregation that "he never saw the plates with his natural eyes, only in vision or imagination." A neighbor of Harris in Kirtland, Ohio, said that Harris "never claimed to have seen [the plates] with his natural eyes, only spiritual vision."

One account states that in March 1838, Harris publicly denied that either he or the other Witnesses to the Book of Mormon had literally seen the golden plates—although, of course, he had not been present when Whitmer and Cowdery first stated they had viewed them. This account says that recantation of Harris, made during a period of crisis in early Mormonism, induced five influential members, including three apostles, to leave the church. Later in life, Harris strongly denied that he ever made this statement.

In 1837, Harris joined dissenters, led by Warren Parrish, in an attempt to reform the church. But Parrish rejected the Book of Mormon, and Harris continued to believe in it. By 1840, Harris had returned to Smith's church. Following Smith's death, Harris accepted James J. Strang as a new prophet, and Strang also stated he had been divinely led to an ancient record engraved upon metal plates. By 1847, Harris had broken with Strang and had accepted the leadership of fellow Book of Mormon witness, Whitmer. Harris then left Whitmer for another Mormon factional leader, Gladden Bishop. In 1855, Harris joined with the last surviving brother of Joseph Smith, William, and declared him as Joseph's true successor. In 1856, Harris was living in Kirtland and, as caretaker of the temple, gave tours to interested visitors.

Despite his earlier statements regarding the spiritual nature of his experience, in 1853, Harris told one David Dille that he had held the forty- to sixty-pound plates on his knee for "an hour-and-a-half" and handled them "plate after plate." Even later, Harris affirmed that he had seen the plates and the angel: "Gentlemen," holding out his hand, "do you see that hand? Are you sure you see it? Or are your eyes playing you a trick or something? No. Well, as sure as you see my hand so sure did I see the Angel and the plates."

In 1870, at the age of 87, Harris accepted an invitation to live in Utah Territory, where he was rebaptized into the Church of Jesus Christ of Latter-day Saints (LDS Church) and spent his remaining years with relatives in Cache County. In his last years, Harris continued to bear fervent testimony to the authenticity of the plates, but a contemporary critic of the church has noted that Harris rejected some important Mormon doctrines and that his sympathy for the LDS Church was tenuous. In a letter of 1870, Harris swore, "no man ever heard me in any way deny the truth of the Book of Mormon, the administration of the angel that showed me the plates, nor the organization of the Church of Jesus Christ of Latter Day Saints under the administration of Joseph Smith, Jun., the prophet whom the Lord raised up for that purpose in these the latter days, that he may show forth his power and glory."

== See also ==
- Reformed Egyptian
