= John Whitmer =

Early LDS church leader and historian

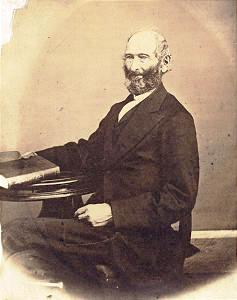

Official church historians
- March 8, 1831 – 1835
- Called by: Joseph Smith
- Predecessor: Oliver Cowdery (Acting)
- Successor: Oliver Cowdery

Personal details
- Born: August 27, 1802; York, Pennsylvania, United States
- Died: July 11, 1878 (aged 75); Far West, Missouri, United States
- Resting place: Kingston Cemetery; 39.6474°N 94.0367°W
- Spouse(s): Sarah M Whitmer
- Parents: Peter Whitmer, Sr. Mary Elsa Musselman
- Relatives: Including brothers: Christian Whitmer; Jacob Whitmer; David Whitmer; Peter Whitmer, Jr.
- Website: Brief Biography of John Whitmer
- Signature

John Whitmer (August 27, 1802 – July 11, 1878) was an early leader in the Latter Day Saint movement. He was one of the Eight Witnesses of the Book of Mormon's golden plates. Whitmer was also the first official Church Historian and a member of the presidency of the church in Missouri from 1834 to 1838.

== Biography ==
Whitmer was born in Pennsylvania on August 27, 1802, to Peter Whitmer, Sr. and Mary Musselman. He had seven siblings. In 1809, the Whitmer family moved to Fayette, New York. Here, Whitmer was a member of the German Reformed Church.

=== Foundation of the Latter Day Saint movement ===
Whitmer's brother David and his entire family became early followers of Joseph Smith, the founder of the Latter Day Saint movement. Joseph and his wife, Emma Smith, boarded with the Whitmers for six months. Whitmer was baptized into the movement by Oliver Cowdery in June 1829, nearly a year prior to the formal organization of the Church of Christ. In that same month, Whitmer became one of eight men who signed a testimony that they had handled and been shown the golden plates. Known as the "Testimony of the Eight Witnesses", the statement was printed in the first edition of the Book of Mormon and has been included in almost every subsequent edition.

The church was formally organized on April 6, 1830 in the Whitmer family's home. John Whitmer was one of the earliest members and he was ordained an elder of the church on June 9. He moved to the church's new headquarters at Kirtland, Ohio, in December 1830 at the encouragement of Joseph Smith. The next year, on March 8, 1831, Smith said that he received a revelation from God, calling Whitmer to "write and keep a regular history" of the church. This revelation was printed by Latter Day Saints as Book of Commandments 50, and in the Doctrine and Covenants (originally section 63, the revelation is now section 47 of the LDS Church edition). He soon began writing a historical record of the church, a project he worked on until about 1847. Whitmer was to "accompany Oliver Cowdery to Zion (Independence, Missouri) with the manuscript of the Book of Commandments, forerunner of the Doctrine and Covenants, and [was] made one of the stewards over the modern revelations."

Whitmer was made a high priest in the church by Lyman Wight on June 4, 1831 and acted as one of Joseph Smith's scribes during the final steps of the Book of Mormon translation.

=== Leader of the church in Missouri ===
Later in 1831, Whitmer joined the growing number of Latter Day Saints in Jackson County, Missouri. Here, he married Sarah Maria Jackson on February 10, 1833. Local opposition to Mormon settlement in the county resulted in the expulsion of most of the Latter Day Saints by November 1833. Whitmer, along with many of the others, took refuge in neighboring Clay County. At a July 3, 1834, conference of the church, Whitmer's brother David was called to be the president of the church in Missouri. John Whitmer was called as his brother's second counselor, and W. W. Phelps was called as his first. When David returned to Kirtland, John Whitmer and Phelps were left to preside in his absence. Whitmer wrote several petitions to Missouri's governor, Daniel Dunklin, asking that the Latter Day Saints be allowed to return to their lands in Jackson County. He also edited the Latter Day Saints' Messenger and Advocate from 1835 to 1836 in his capacity as a member of the church presidency.

Whitmer and Phelps worked with sympathetic non-Mormon residents in Clay County, such as Alexander Doniphan, to purchase land northeast of Clay. The land became Caldwell County, a new county set aside for Mormon settlement. Together with Phelps, Whitmer founded the town of Far West. He remained a member of the church presidency until his excommunication in 1838.

=== Whitmer's excommunication ===
Problems at church headquarters in Kirtland relating to the Kirtland Safety Society bank caused Joseph Smith and Sidney Rigdon to relocate to Far West in early 1838. A brief leadership struggle ensued, which led to the excommunication of the entire Whitmer family, as well as Oliver Cowdery, W. W. Phelps, and others on March 10, 1838. Upon his excommunication, John Whitmer refused to give the church the documents and records he had worked on as Church Historian. Whitmer was accused of "persisting in unchristianlike conduct," particularly in his financial dealings; he allegedly allotted $2,000 worth of the church's money for his own personal use. He had, along with David Whitmer and W. W. Phelps, purchased deeds to land in Far West under his own name instead of the church's. Whitmer continued to live in Far West for a time and became known as one of the "dissenters". Sidney Rigdon, in his "Salt Sermon", warned the dissenters to leave the county, and his words were soon followed up by perceived threats from the newly formed Mormon confraternity known as the Danites.

Whitmer moved to Richmond in neighboring Ray County, Missouri. The Whitmer family's complaints and those of the other dissenters are sometimes cited as one of the causes of the 1838 Mormon War. This conflict between Latter Day Saints and their neighbors in northwestern Missouri ended with the expulsion of the former, who eventually relocated to a new headquarters at Nauvoo, Illinois.

=== Whitmer returns to Far West ===
Whitmer's parents and his brother David remained in Richmond for the rest of their lives, but John and his own family returned to Far West. He bought 625 acres of land in the town. Emptied of Latter Day Saints, Far West became a ghost town. Many of its houses were moved off to other settlements, and Far West lost the county seat to nearby Kingston. Whitmer continued to live in Far West, buying up land (including the proposed temple site) and eventually amassing a large farm. He occasionally gave visitors tours of the former settlement.

After Joseph Smith's death in 1844, several leaders asserted their claims to be his rightful successor. Among these was Whitmer's brother David. Whitmer briefly associated with James Strang; however, in 1847, Whitmer was briefly part of a renewed Church of Christ (Whitmerite). He never recanted the testimony of the Book of Mormon he'd given as one of the Eight Witnesses. When Jacob Gates visited him in 1861, Whitmer reaffirmed that he believed in the Book of Mormon but expressed dismay with the practice of plural marriage that Brigham Young and his followers adhered to.

Whitmer died at the age of 75 on July 11, 1878, in Far West. He is buried in nearby Kingston, Missouri in the Kingston Cemetery.

== Whitmer's manuscript ==
In 1831 Whitmer was called as Church Historian, and began then to write a record entitled The Book of John Whitmer, Kept by Commandment. His book begins with an account of events leading up to the relocation of the church's headquarters from New York to Kirtland, Ohio. He discusses many of the troubles experienced by the Latter Day Saints in Missouri and ends the work with an account of his own excommunication in March 1838. Afterwards, a continuation tells of the mistreatment he felt he and the other dissenters had received at the hands of Joseph Smith and Sidney Rigdon.

Whitmer had initially resisted Joseph Smith's 1831 request to serve as the church historian but eventually accepted after receiving a revelation affirming it as God's will. Despite his prior experience as a scribe for the Book of Mormon and other church documents, he was hesitant about the expanded responsibilities of a historian. Once appointed, Whitmer diligently recorded church events, incorporating revelations, letters, and other documents into his history. His work detailed the early growth of the church, including the establishment of the church in Missouri and the conflicts with local residents. While he started writing in the early 1830s, textual evidence suggests that the bulk of his history was composed in 1838, around the time of his excommunication from the church.

Following his excommunication, Whitmer refused to turn over his manuscript when William W. Phelps inquired about it in the early 1840s, prompting Joseph Smith and other leaders to begin a new historical record. Whitmer later revised his work, removing earlier conciliatory remarks and adding critical commentary on church leadership. Though he distanced himself from the main body of Latter-day Saints, he maintained his testimony of the Book of Mormon in the history.

Whitmer's manuscript was given by a descendant of David Whitmer to the Reorganized Church of Jesus Christ of Latter Day Saints (RLDS Church, now Community of Christ), who maintained ownership for over a century. The book was sold along with several historical properties and artifacts to the Church of Jesus Christ of Latter-day Saints in March 2024.

== John Whitmer Historical Association ==
On September 18, 1972, historians and scholars associated with the RLDS Church founded the John Whitmer Historical Association (JWHA) to "create and encourage interest in Latter Day Saint history, especially the history of Community of Christ" and support other studies in Latter Day Saint history. The association publishes two academic journals, the John Whitmer Historical Association Journal and Restoration Studies, as well as a newsletter. It also holds conferences and lecture series and gives awards.
