= Peter Whitmer Jr. =

Book of Mormon witness

Peter Whitmer Jr. (September 27, 1809 – September 22, 1836) was the sixth child and fifth son of Peter Whitmer Sr. and Mary Musselman. He is primarily remembered as one of the Eight Witnesses of the Book of Mormon's golden plates.

== Biography ==
Born in Fayette, New York, Whitmer and several of his brothers were shown the gold plates by Joseph Smith in 1829. Whitmer was one of the official six members of the Church of Christ on April 6, 1830. Shortly thereafter, Whitmer was called to travel with Oliver Cowdery, Parley P. Pratt and Ziba Peterson on a special mission to preach the faith to the Native Americans. This mission led to the conversion of former Campbellite minister Sidney Rigdon.

Whitmer subsequently moved to Jackson County, Missouri, where he married Vashti Higley on October 14, 1832, with whom he had three children. By 1835, Whitmer and his family had relocated to the new Latter Day Saint settlement of Far West, Missouri, where he sat on the church's high council. He was almost 27 years old when he died of tuberculosis in Liberty, Missouri.
