= Martin Harris =

Martin Harris may refer to:

- Martin Harris (diplomat) (born 1969), British diplomat and ambassador to Ukraine
- Martin Harris (linguist) (born 1944), British academic and former vice-chancellor
- Martin Harris (footballer) (born 1955), English footballer
- Martin Harris (Latter Day Saints) (1783–1875), American Latter-day Saint
- Martin Harris (swimmer) (born 1969), English backstroke swimmer
- Martin H. Harris (1820–1889), American pioneer and Latter-day Saint

== See also ==
- Harris Martin (1865–1903), American boxer
