= Articles of the Church of Christ =

The "Articles of the Church of Christ" was an 1829 revelation purportedly given by God to Oliver Cowdery in the early history of the Latter Day Saint movement. The original Articles were never included in the Mormon canon; however, the language of much of the Articles found its way into various sections of the Book of Commandments and the Doctrine and Covenants, such as D&C 20. The Article begins, "A commandment from God unto Oliver how he should build up his church & the manner thereof—"
