= Mary Whitmer =

Book of Mormon witness (1778–1856)

Mary Musselman Whitmer

Personal details
- Born: Mary Elsa Musselman; August 27, 1778; Germany
- Died: January 1856, age 77; Richmond, Missouri, United States
- Resting place: Old Pioneer Cemetery
- Spouse(s): Peter Whitmer
- Children: 8
- Parents: Jacob and Elizabeth Musselman

Mary Elsa Musselman Whitmer (August 27, 1778 – January 1856) was a Book of Mormon witness and the wife of Peter Whitmer Sr.

== Biography ==
She was born Mary Elsa Musselman in Germany to Jacob and Elizabeth Musselman. She immigrated to Pennsylvania in the late-18th century, where she met and married Peter Whitmer, a farmer, also of German descent. They moved to Waterloo, New York, in the year of 1809, and later purchased a farm in Fayette, New York. They had eight children, Christian Whitmer, Jacob Whitmer, John Whitmer, David Whitmer, Catherine Whitmer Page, Peter Whitmer Jr., Nancy Whitmer, and Elizabeth Whitmer Cowdery.

Through her son David, she and her family became acquainted with Joseph Smith around 1828. In 1829, she was caring for three boarders (Smith, Emma Hale Smith, and Oliver Cowdery) in addition to her large household while the Book of Mormon was being translated. She said that she was often overloaded with work to the extent she felt it quite a burden. During this time, the male boarders and members of her household were speaking of being shown the golden plates. One evening, when she went to milk the cows, she said that a stranger with a knapsack spoke to her, explained what was going on in her house, comforted her, then produced a bundle of plates from his knapsack, turned the leaves for her, showed her the engravings, exhorted her to faith in bearing her burden a little longer, then suddenly vanished with the plates. Whitmer always called the stranger "Brother Nephi".

Whitmer was baptized a member of the Church of Christ by Oliver Cowdery in Seneca Lake, April 18, 1830.

She was excommunicated from the church with the entire Whitmer family in 1838, largely due to their dismay at the failure of the Kirtland Safety Society, as well as personal criticism from Joseph Smith. The family moved to Richmond, Missouri, the same year, and she died there in January 1856, at the age of 77.

== Sources ==
- Whitmer, John C. (October 1888). "The Eight Witnesses". The Historical Record. 7. Salt Lake City: Andrew Jenson: 621.
- Jenson, Andrew (1901). Latter-day Saint biographical encyclopedia: A compilation of biographical sketches of prominent men and women in the Church of Jesus Christ of Latter-Day Saints. Vol. 1. Salt Lake City, Utah: The Andrew Jenson History Company (Printed by The Deseret News Press). p. 283.
- Keith W. Perkins, "True to the Book of Mormon—The Whitmers", Ensign, February 1989.
