= Peter Whitmer Sr. =

American Mormon leader (1773–1854)

Personal details
- Born: Peter Whitmer; April 14, 1773; Pennsylvania, British America
- Died: August 12, 1854 (aged 81); Richmond, Missouri, United States
- Resting place: Old Pioneer Cemetery; 39.2848°N 93.9763°W
- Spouse(s): Mary Mussleman Whitmer
- Parents: George Witmer; Maria Sallome

Peter Whitmer Sr. (April 14, 1773 – August 12, 1854) was an early member of The Church of Jesus Christ of Latter Day Saints, and father of the church's second founding family.

Whitmer was born in Pennsylvania and married Mary Elsa Musselman. The Whitmers had eight children together: Christian, Jacob, John, David, Catherine, Peter Jr., Nancy, and Elizabeth Ann. In 1809, the family moved to Waterloo, New York, where they joined a German Reformed church and where Peter became a road overseer and school trustee. After 1827, they moved to Fayette.

Through their son David, Peter and family became acquainted with Joseph Smith around 1828. In spring 1829 Joseph, his wife Emma Hale Smith, and Oliver Cowdery boarded at Whitmer's home while the Book of Mormon translation was completed there. In June 1829, Peter's sons and his son-in-law Hiram Page became witnesses to the golden plates. When the Church of Christ was organized on April 6, 1830, the Whitmers were among its first members. Their Fayette home is the site of the church's organization. Oliver Cowdery, who had assisted Smith in the translation of the Book of Mormon from the golden plates, married Elizabeth Ann Whitmer in December 1832.

All surviving members of the Whitmer family broke with Smith in 1838 in Far West, Missouri, and were excommunicated from the church. Whitmer moved to Richmond, Missouri, where he lived until his death.
