= Jacob Whitmer =

Book of Mormon witness

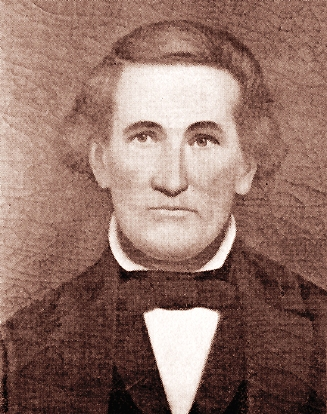

Personal details
- Born: February 2, 1800; Pennsylvania, United States
- Died: April 21, 1856 (aged 56)
- Resting place: Richmond Pioneer Cemetery, Missouri, United States; 39°17′6.76″N 93°58′34.93″W
- Known For: One of the Eight Witnesses
- Spouse(s): Elizabeth Schott
- Children: 9
- Parents: Peter Whitmer, Sr. Mary Musselman
- Signature

Jacob Whitmer (February 2, 1800 – April 21, 1856) was the second born child of Peter Whitmer, Sr., and Mary Musselman. He is primarily remembered as one of the Eight Witnesses of the Book of Mormon's golden plates.

== Biography ==
Born in Pennsylvania, Whitmer moved with his parents to New York, where he married Elizabeth Schott on September 29, 1825. Whitmer and Elizabeth had nine children together, only three of whom survived to adulthood.

Whitmer’s younger brother, David, became a close associate of Joseph Smith. In June 1829, Jacob Whitmer joined his brothers in signing a statement testifying that he personally saw and handled the golden plates said to be in Smith's possession. On April 11, 1830, he was baptized into the newly organized Church of Christ.

Whitmer moved with the majority of the New York church members to Ohio in 1831. Whitmer then gathered with early church members to Jackson County, Missouri by 1833, but was driven by anti-Mormon vigilantes from his home there, and later from his home in Clay County, Missouri. He then settled in Caldwell County, Missouri where he served on Far West's high council and received an elder’s license from the church in December 1837.

In a dispute over land ownership in Far West, Whitmer was excommunicated from the church in 1838 along with the rest of the living members of the Whitmer family, and driven again from his home—this time by Mormon vigilantes.

Whitmer settled finally near Richmond in neighboring Ray County, where he worked as a shoemaker and a farmer. He died on April 21, 1856, still affirming his testimony of the golden plates.
