= Church of Christ (Latter Day Saints) =

Original name of the Latter Day Saint church founded by Joseph Smith in the 1820s

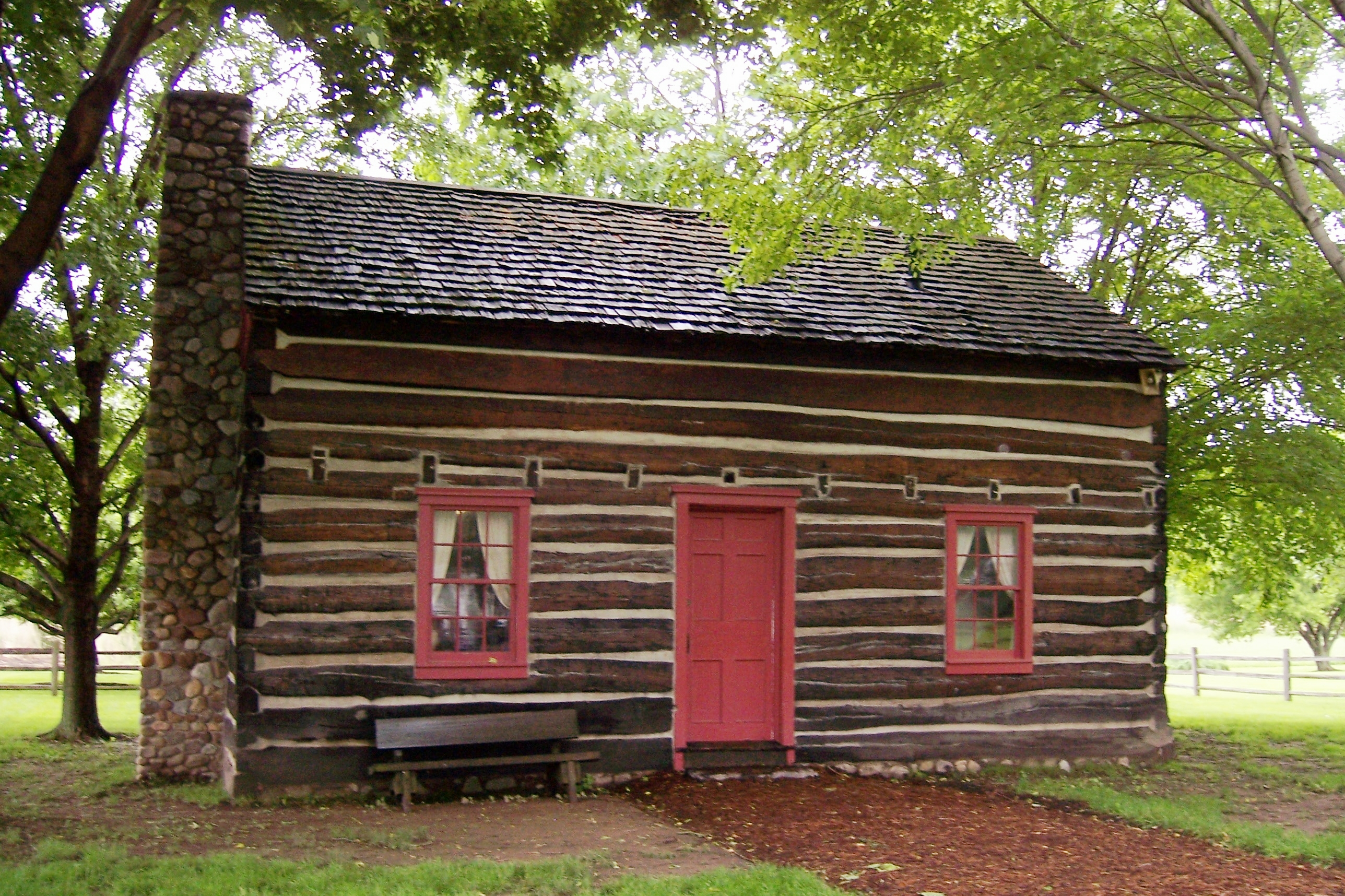
A reconstruction of the original log house of Peter Whitmer Sr. in Fayette, New York

The Church of Christ was the original name of the Latter Day Saint church founded by Joseph Smith. Organized informally in 1829 in upstate New York and then formally on April 6, 1830, it was the first organization to implement the principles found in Smith's newly published Book of Mormon, and thus its establishment represents the formal beginning of the Latter Day Saint movement. Later names for this organization included the Church of the Latter Day Saints (by 1834 resolution), the Church of Jesus Christ, the Church of God, the Church of Christ of Latter Day Saints, and the Church of Jesus Christ of Latter Day Saints (by an 1838 revelation).

Smith and his associates asserted that the Church of Christ was a restoration of the 1st-century early Christian church, which Smith claimed had fallen from God's favor and authority because of what he called a "Great Apostasy". After Smith's death in 1844, there was a crisis of authority, with the majority of the members following Brigham Young to the Salt Lake Valley, but with several smaller denominations remaining in Illinois or settling in Missouri and in other states. Each of the churches that resulted from this schism considers itself to be the rightful continuation of Smith's original "Church of Christ", regardless of the name they may currently bear (The Church of Jesus Christ of Latter-day Saints (LDS Church), Community of Christ, The Church of Jesus Christ (Bickertonite), Church of Christ (Temple Lot), etc.).

This church is unrelated to other bodies bearing the same name, including the United Church of Christ, a Reformed church body, and the Churches of Christ, who have roots in the Restoration Movement. Today, there are several Latter Day Saint denominations called "Church of Christ", largely within the Hedrickite branch of the movement.

== Doctrinal development prior to 1830 ==
The first Latter Day Saint references to the "church of Christ" are found in passages of the Book of Mormon that Smith dictated from April to June 1829. During the course of this dictation, the outlines for a community of believers or church structure gradually became apparent. Such a structure would have authority from God, ordinances such as baptism, and ordained clergy. Some time in April 1829, Smith dictated a story of Alma the Elder, the former priest of a wicked king, who baptized his followers by immersion, "having authority from the Almighty God", and called his community of believers the "church of God, or the church of Christ". The book described the clergy in Alma's church as consisting of priests, who were unpaid and were to "preach nothing save it were repentance and faith in the Lord". Alma later established many churches (or congregations), which were considered "one church" because "there was nothing preached in all the churches except it were repentance and faith in God." In addition to priests, the book mentions that the clergy of these churches also included teachers.

Nevertheless, in May 1829, a revelation by Smith described the "church" in informal terms: "Behold, this is my doctrine: whosoever repenteth and cometh unto me, the same is my church: whosoever declareth more or less than this, the same is not of me, but is against me: therefore, he is not of my church." Smith's further dictation of the Book of Mormon also stated that there were "two churches only; the one is the church of the Lamb of God, and the other is the church of the devil".

Also in May 1829, Smith and Oliver Cowdery said they were visited by John the Baptist in angelic form, who conferred the Aaronic priesthood on them, which included the authority to baptize in Jesus Christ's name. Smith and Cowdery then baptized each other by immersion. They also baptized dozens of people, as early as June 1829. These converts, however, did not belong to a formal church organization. Nevertheless, this community of believers referred to themselves as "the Church of Christ", and included converts in three New York towns: Fayette, Manchester, and Colesville.

In June 1829, Smith dictated a revelation stating that "in [the Book of Mormon] are all things written, concerning my church, my gospel, and my rock. Wherefore if you shall build up my church, and my gospel, and my rock, the gates of hell shall not prevail against you." Some time between June and December 1829, Cowdery said he received a revelation about "how he should build up his church & the manner thereof". This revelation was called the "Articles of the Church of Christ", and it indicated that the church should ordain priests and teachers "according to the gifts & callings of God unto men". The church was to meet regularly to partake of bread and wine. Cowdery was described as "an Apostle of Jesus Christ". According to David Whitmer, by April 1830, this informal "Church of Christ" had about six elders and 70 members.

== Organization of the church ==
On April 6, 1830, Joseph Smith, Oliver Cowdery, and a group of approximately 30 believers met with the intention of formally organizing the Church of Christ into a legal institution. It is uncertain whether this occurred in the home of Peter Whitmer Sr. in Fayette, New York, or whether it occurred in the log home of Joseph Smith Sr. near their property in Manchester, New York. Soon after this formal organization, small branches were formally established in Manchester, Fayette, and Colesville. Although the purpose was to effect a legal organization, it may have had no legal effect since no records of incorporation have been found in either the Manchester–Palmyra area, the Fayette area, or in several other counties around this time period, as required by state law at the time: the church evidently did not follow the required legal formalities.

=== Location of the organization ===
Prior to 1834, all church publications and documents stated that the church was organized in the Smith log home in Manchester, New York. The first Smith log home was located on the Samuel Jennings property in Palmyra, just north of the town's southern border and subsequent the Smith Manchester property. The Smiths may have constructed a second log home on their own property. Beginning in 1834, several church publications began to give the location of the organizational meeting as Fayette, at the home of Peter Whitmer Sr. The Whitmer home had been the site of many other meetings near the same time period. After 1834, several official church accounts said the meeting was in Manchester and several eyewitnesses said the event took place in Manchester.

Independent researcher H. Michael Marquardt argues that the evidence suggests the organization occurred in Manchester, and that the confusion was likely due to the effect of memory tending to conflate memories of several meetings in Manchester and Fayette years earlier. Critics suggest that the location of the organization was intentionally changed in 1834 around the same time the church's name was changed to the "Church of the Latter Day Saints", in order to make it seem like the new church organization was different from the "Church of Christ", as a tactic to frustrate the church's creditors and avoid payment of debts.

There is also evidence pointing to Fayette as the place of organization. For example, a headnote to the earliest known version of chapter XXII of the Book of Commandments says that the revelation was dictated in Fayette on April 6, 1830, after the church was organized. This was changed to "Manchester" when the book was published in 1833. Officially, the major denominations of the Latter Day Saint movement claim Fayette as the birthplace of the religion, and Smith's official history, begun in 1838, listed Fayette as the founding place. In 1887, one other eye-witness, David Whitmer, recollected that the event occurred in his father's home in Fayette; however, years earlier, in 1875, Whitmer had already told a reporter that the event occurred in Manchester. Marquardt argues that the event described by Whitmer in 1887 bears more resemblance to Fayette meetings such as the founding of the church's Fayette branch five days later on April 11, 1830.

The largest successor organization to the Church of Christ, the LDS Church, accepts Fayette as the official location of the organizing meeting.

=== Events at the organization ===
By later accounts, the April 6 organizational meeting was a charismatic event, in which members of the congregation had visions, prophesied, spoke in tongues, ecstatically shouted praises to the Lord, and fainted. At this meeting, the church formally ordained a lay ministry, with the priesthood offices of deacon, teacher, priest, and elder. Smith and Cowdery, according to their 1831 account, were each ordained as "an apostle of Jesus Christ, an elder of the church". This account was edited in 1835 to state that Smith was ordained the "First Elder", and Oliver Cowdery was ordained the "Second Elder".

=== First members of the church ===
According to the LDS Church, the first six members of the Church of Christ were:

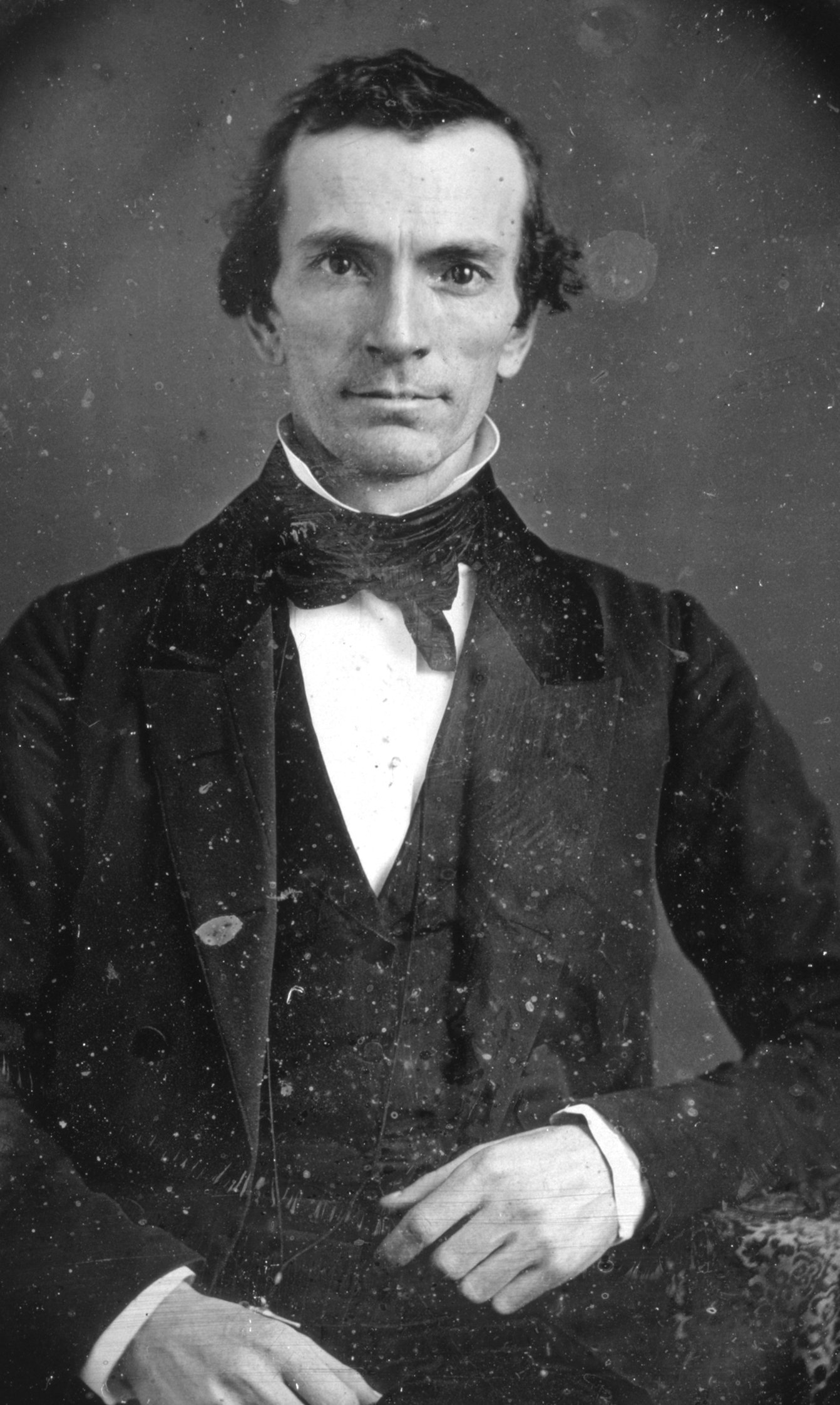
Oliver Cowdery

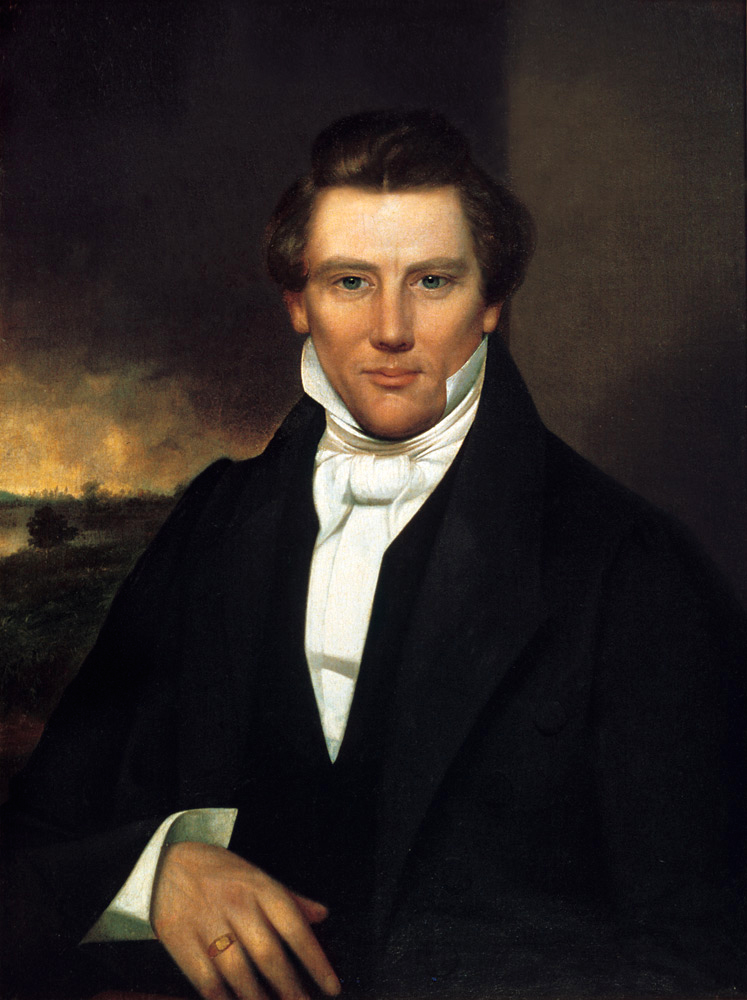
Joseph Smith

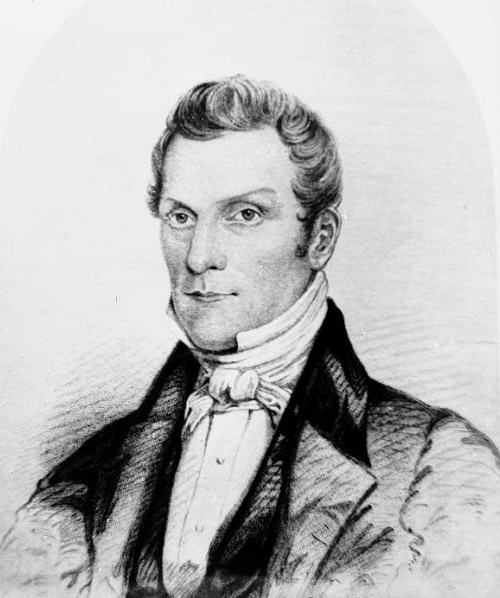
Hyrum Smith

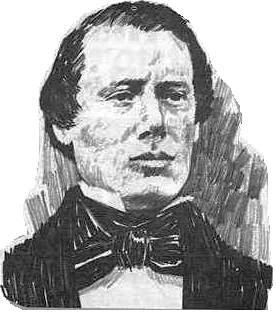
Samuel H. Smith

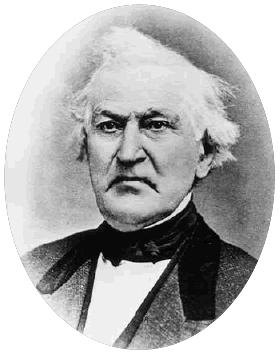
David Whitmer

Not shown: Peter Whitmer Jr.
- Oliver Cowdery
- Joseph Smith
- Hyrum Smith
- Peter Whitmer Jr.
- Samuel H. Smith
- David Whitmer

Early membership also included the Three Witnesses and the Eight Witnesses to the Book of Mormon and members of the extended Whitmer and Smith families. Other early members included friends and acquaintances of the Smith and Whitmer families, such as Porter Rockwell.

== The name of the church ==
=== Historical background ===
Smith's revelations authorized and commanded the organization of the "Church of Christ" in 1830, and in several of the revelations Smith said he received, God referred to the church by that name. Smith taught that this church was a restoration of the primitive Christian church established by Jesus in the 1st century AD. Smith also taught that this restoration occurred in the "Latter Days" of the world, that is, the time immediately prior to the Second Coming of Jesus.

=== Early changes ===
The fact that a number of the churches of the Restoration Movement were also named the "Church of Christ" caused a considerable degree of confusion in the first years of the Latter Day Saint movement. Because of the distinct belief in the Book of Mormon among Smith's followers, people outside the church began to refer them as "Mormonites" or "Mormons". Smith and other church elders considered the name "Mormon" derogatory. In May 1834, the church adopted a resolution that the church would be known thereafter as "The Church of the Latter Day Saints". At various times the church was also referred to as "The Church of Jesus Christ", "The Church of God", and "The Church of Christ of Latter Day Saints".

In the late 1830s, Smith and those loyal to him founded a new headquarters in Far West, Missouri. At Far West in 1838, Smith announced a revelation renaming the organization the "Church of Jesus Christ of Latter Day Saints".

=== Later variations ===
Up to the time of Smith's death, the church was known alternatively as the "Church of Jesus Christ of Latter Day Saints" or the "Church of Jesus Christ of Latter-Day Saints", that is, with or without a hyphen. After Smith's death, competing Latter Day Saint denominations organized under the leadership of a number of successors. The largest of these, led by Brigham Young and now based in Salt Lake City, Utah, continued using "Church of Jesus Christ of Latter Day Saints" until incorporating in 1851, when the church standardized the spelling of its name as "The Church of Jesus Christ of Latter-day Saints" (LDS Church). Followers of James J. Strang use the spelling of the public domain name, "Church of Jesus Christ of Latter Day Saints", as the name of their church.

The name "Church of Jesus Christ of Latter Day Saints" was also used by members who recognized Smith's son, Joseph Smith III, as his father's successor. The younger Smith became prophet-president of this group on April 6, 1860. However, the church incorporated in 1872 as the "Reorganized Church of Jesus Christ of Latter Day Saints" (RLDS Church), to distinguish it from the larger Utah church, at the time in the midst of federal issues related to polygamy. In 2001, the RLDS Church changed its name again to "Community of Christ"—consciously echoing the original "Church of Christ" name.

The Sidney Rigdon group dwindled until one of its elders, William Bickerton, reorganized in 1862 under the name "The Church of Jesus Christ". Other Latter Day Saint denominations returned to the original name or a variation of the name, including the Church of Christ (Temple Lot), the Church of Jesus Christ (Cutlerite), and the now-extinct Church of Christ (Whitmerite).

== Succession claims ==
Virtually every Latter Day Saint denomination claims to be the rightful successor to the original Church of Christ and claims Joseph Smith as its founding prophet or first president. For example, the LDS Church, Community of Christ, Church of Jesus Christ of Latter Day Saints (Strangite), Church of Christ (Temple Lot), and Church of Christ with the Elijah Message all claim to have been organized by Smith on April 6, 1830, the date on which the Church of Christ was organized. Other denominations, such as The Church of Jesus Christ (Bickertonite), acknowledge that their organizations were created after this date, but nevertheless claim to be a re-establishment of the original church.

In an 1880 lawsuit, an Ohio court held that the RLDS Church was the lawful successor to Smith's original Church of Christ. The court also explicitly held that the LDS Church was not the lawful successor because it "has materially and largely departed from the faith, doctrines, law, ordinances and usages of the said original Church". These holdings were preliminary findings of fact based on the RLDS Church's unopposed legal submissions; the court issued no final judgment on the matter because the case was dismissed.

In 1894, a federal United States court in Missouri held again that the RLDS Church was the lawful successor to the original church. However, on appeal the entire case was dismissed by the United States Court of Appeals for the Eighth Circuit without any discussion by the court of the issue of legal succession.

== See also ==
- History of the Latter Day Saint movement
- List of denominations in the Latter Day Saint movement
