= Oliver Cowdery =

American Mormon leader (1806–1850)

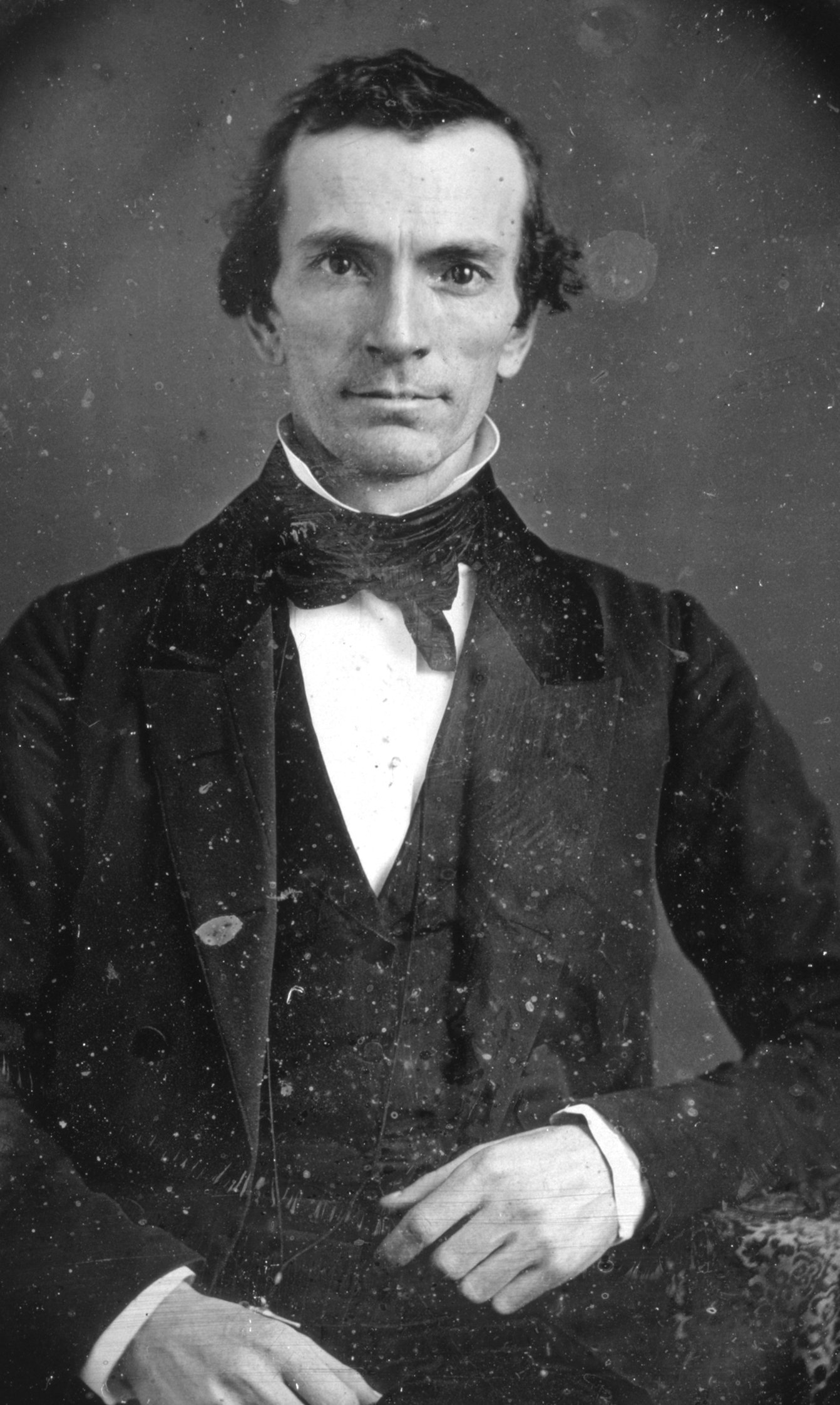
- Daguerreotype of Oliver Cowdery found in the Library of Congress, taken in the 1840s by James Presley Ball

Assistant Counselor in the First Presidency
- September 3, 1837 – April 11, 1838
- Called by: Joseph Smith
- End reason: Resignation / Excommunication

Assistant President of the Church
- December 5, 1834 – April 11, 1838
- Called by: Joseph Smith
- End reason: Resignation / Excommunication

Second Elder of the Church
- April 6, 1830 – December 5, 1834
- Called by: Joseph Smith
- End reason: Called as Assistant President of the Church

Latter Day Saint Apostle
- 1829 (aged 22) – April 12, 1838
- Called by: Joseph Smith
- Reason: Restoration of priesthood
- End reason: Resignation / Excommunication
- Reorganization at end of term: No apostles immediately ordained

Personal details
- Born: Oliver H. P. Cowdery; October 3, 1806; Wells, Vermont, U.S.
- Died: March 3, 1850 (aged 43); Richmond, Missouri, U.S.
- Resting place: Richmond Pioneer Cemetery, Missouri, U.S. 39°17′6.76″N 93°58′34.93″W
- Spouse(s): Elizabeth Ann Whitmer
- Children: 6
- Signature

Oliver H. P. Cowdery (October 3, 1806 – March 3, 1850) was an American religious leader who, with Joseph Smith, was an important participant in the formative period of the Latter Day Saint movement in the 1820s and 1830s.

He was the principal scribe to the Book of Mormon, the first baptized Latter Day Saint, one of the Three Witnesses to the Book of Mormon's golden plates, one of the first Latter Day Saint apostles, a key early missionary, and a member of the First Presidency in Kirtland.

Cowdery's relationship with Joseph Smith and the church's leadership deteriorated in the mid-1830s, and in 1838 he was excommunicated with several other prominent Missouri leaders amid a leadership struggle with Smith.

After his excommunication, Cowdery moved to Wisconsin, where he practiced law and became involved in local politics. Cowdery briefly joined a Methodist church before being rebaptized into the Church of Jesus Christ of Latter-day Saints (LDS Church) in 1848.

== Early life ==
Oliver Cowdery was born October 3, 1806, in Wells, Vermont; his father, William, moved the family to the nearby town of Poultney when Cowdery was three years old. His mother, Rebecca Fuller Cowdery, died on September 3, 1809.

At age 20, Cowdery left Vermont for upstate New York, where his older brothers had settled. He clerked at a store for just over two years and in 1829 became a school teacher in Manchester. Cowdery lodged with different families in the area, including that of Joseph Smith, Sr., who was said to have provided Cowdery with additional information about the golden plates of which Cowdery said he had heard "from all quarters."

== Role in early Latter Day Saint movement ==
=== Encounter with Smith ===
Cowdery met Joseph Smith on April 5, 1829—a year and a day before the official founding of the Church of Christ—and heard from him how he had received golden plates containing ancient writings. Cowdery told Smith that he had seen the golden plates in a vision before the two had met. Before meeting Cowdery, Smith had virtually stopped translating after the first 116 pages had been lost by Martin Harris. Working with Cowdery, however, Smith completed the manuscript of what would become the Book of Mormon between April 7 and June 1829, in what Richard Bushman later called a "burst of rapid-fire translation." Cowdery also unsuccessfully attempted to translate part of the Book of Mormon by himself.

Cowdery and Smith reported that on May 15, 1829, they received the Aaronic priesthood from the resurrected John the Baptist, after which they baptized each other in the Susquehanna River. Cowdery said that he and Smith later went into the forest and prayed "until a glorious light encircled us, and as we arose on account of the light, three persons stood before us dressed in white, their faces beaming with glory." One of the three announced that he was the Apostle Peter and said the others were the apostles James and John, who many presume then gave them the Melchizedek priesthood.

Later that year, Cowdery reported sharing a vision, along with Smith and David Whitmer, in which an angel showed them the golden plates. Harris said he saw a similar vision later that day. Cowdery, Whitmer and Harris signed a statement to that effect and became known as the Three Witnesses. Their testimony has subsequently been published in nearly every edition of the Book of Mormon.

== Church service and leadership ==
When the Church of Christ was organized on April 6, 1830, Smith became "First Elder" and Cowdery "Second Elder." Although Cowdery was technically second in authority to Smith from the organization of the church through 1838, in practice Sidney Rigdon, Smith's "spokesman" and counselor in the First Presidency, began to supplant Cowdery as early as 1831. Cowdery held the position of Assistant President of the Church from 1834 until his excommunication in 1838. He was also a member of the first presiding high council of the church, organized in Kirtland, Ohio, in 1834.

On December 18, 1832, Cowdery married Elizabeth Ann Whitmer, the daughter of Peter Whitmer, Sr. and sister of David, John, Jacob and Peter Whitmer, Jr. They had six children, of whom only one daughter survived to maturity.

Cowdery helped Smith publish a series of revelations first called the Book of Commandments and later, as revised and expanded, the Doctrine and Covenants. He was also the editor, or on the editorial board, of several early church publications, including the Evening and Morning Star, the Messenger and Advocate and the Northern Times.

When the church created a bank known as the Kirtland Safety Society (KSS) in 1837, Cowdery obtained the money-printing plates. Sent by Smith to Monroe, Michigan, he became president of the Bank of Monroe, in which the church had a controlling interest. Both banks failed that same year. Cowdery moved to the newly founded Latter Day Saint settlement in Far West, Missouri, and suffered ill health through the winter of 1837–38.

== 1838 split with Smith ==
By early 1838, the relationship between Smith and Cowdery had deteriorated significantly. Cowdery felt that Smith's integration of economic and political plans into his theology and ecclesiastical structure was encroaching on the separation of church and state. Cowdery also expressed his concerns of Smith's relationship with Fanny Alger, a teenage maid living with the Smiths in Kirtland. In a January 1838 letter to his brother Warren:

"[We] had some conversation in which in every instance I did not fail to affirm that which I had said was strictly true. A dirty, nasty, filthy affair of his and Fanny Alger's was talked over in which I strictly declared that I had never deserted from the truth in the matter, and as I supposed was admitted by himself."

In January 1838, Smith and Rigdon left Kirtland and took over the Far West, Missouri church in March 1838, which had previously been under the presidency of W. W. Phelps, John Whitmer, and David Whitmer—a close friend and brother-in-law to Cowdery. Thomas B. Marsh, David W. Patten, and Brigham Young, were ordained as the new stake presidency in Missouri.

The new presidency requested John Whitmer, who had been the Church historian and recorder, and a member of the stake presidency in Missouri, to turn in his historical notes and writings. When he failed to comply, Whitmer was removed from his position, and an investigation into the financial handlings of the Missouri leadership commenced.

Nine excommunication charges were presented against Cowdery, which included selling lands in Jackson County without authorization, trying to destroy the character of Joseph Smith, and disregarding his ecclesiastical duties for the practice of law. On April 12, 1838, a church court excommunicated Cowdery. David Whitmer was also excommunicated at the same time, and apostle Lyman E. Johnson was disfellowshipped; John Whitmer and Phelps had been excommunicated a month earlier. Cowdery refused to appear before the council, but sent a letter of resignation, reiterating his desire to live his religious beliefs independent from his economic and political decisions.

These men became collectively known as "dissenters", but continued to live in and around Far West, where they owned a great deal of property, much of which was purchased when they were acting as agents for the church. Possession became unclear and the dissenters threatened the church with lawsuits. After Rigdon delivered a sermon that implied dissenters had no place in the Latter Day Saint community, a vigilante group called the Danites forcibly expelled them from the county. The Danite Manifesto, a letter addressed to Cowdery and the other dissenters, was signed by some eighty-four Latter-Day Saints (but not Smith or Rigdon). It warned:

you shall have three days after you receive this communication to you, including twenty-four hours in each day, for you to depart with your families peaceably; which you may do undisturbed by any person; but in that time, if you do not depart, we will use the means in our power to cause you to depart.

Cowdery and the dissenters fled the county. Reports about their treatment circulated in nearby non-Mormon communities and increased the tension that led to the 1838 Mormon War, which ultimately resulted in the Latter-Day Saints' expulsion from Missouri.

=== Post-excommunication period (1838–48) ===
Between 1838 and 1848, Cowdery studied and practiced law in Tiffin, Ohio, where he became a civic and political leader. He joined the local Methodist church and served as secretary in 1844. He also edited the local Democratic newspaper until it was learned that he was one of the Three Witnesses, at which time he was reassigned as assistant editor. He was nominated as his district's Democratic Party candidate for the Ohio State Senate in 1846, but was defeated when his Mormon background was discovered.

After the Smiths’ death on June 27, 1844, a succession crisis split the Latter Day Saint movement. Cowdery's father and brother were followers of James J. Strang, who pressed his claim as the movement's successor by claiming that he had found and translated ancient records engraved upon metal plates, similar to the golden plates Smith had translated in the 1820s. In 1847, Cowdery and his brother moved to Elkhorn, Wisconsin, about twelve miles away from Strang's headquarters in Voree. In Elkhorn he entered law practice with his brother and became co-editor of the Walworth County Democrat. In 1848 he ran for state assemblyman but was again defeated when his Mormon ties were disclosed.

== LDS Church rebaptism ==
In 1848, Cowdery traveled to the frontier settlement of Winter Quarters (in present-day North Omaha, Nebraska) to meet with followers of Brigham Young and the Quorum of the Twelve, asking to be reunited with the church. The Twelve referred the application to the high council in Pottawattamie County, Iowa, which convened a meeting with all high priests in the area to consider the matter. After Cowdery convinced the meeting attendees that he no longer maintained any claim to leadership within the church, his application for rebaptism was unanimously approved. On November 12, 1848, Cowdery was rebaptized by Orson Hyde of the Quorum of the Twelve Apostles into what had become - after the succession crisis - the LDS Church in Indian Creek at Kanesville, Iowa.

Cowdery then traveled to Richmond, Missouri to meet with fellow Book of Mormon witness, David Whitmer, to persuade him to move west and rejoin the Saints in Utah Territory. Cowdery, however, succumbed to tuberculosis and died March 3, 1850 in David Whitmer's home in Richmond.

In 1912, the official church magazine Improvement Era published a statement by Jacob F. Gates, son of early Mormon leader Jacob Gates, who had died twenty years prior. According to the recollection by his son, the elder Gates had visited Cowdery in 1849 and inquired about his witness testimony concerning the Book of Mormon, wherein he reportedly reaffirmed his witness.

== Historical controversies ==
Critics who doubt the Book of Mormon and its origin story as given by Smith have speculated that Cowdery may have played a role in the work's composition.

=== Speculation of pre-1829 connection between Cowdery and Smith ===
Cowdery was a third cousin of Lucy Mack Smith, Joseph Smith's mother. There is also a geographical connection between the Smiths and the Cowderys.

New Israelites

Joseph Smith, Sr. and Cowdery's father, William, may have been members of a Congregationalist sect known as the New Israelites, organized in Rutland County, Vermont. The Cowdery family lived in Rutland County in the early 19th century and later attended a Congregationalist church in Poultney, Vermont (some historical discrepancies exist as witnesses from Vermont connected William Cowdery to the sect before these witnesses could have known that his son, Oliver, engaged in dowsing).

Vermont residents interviewed by a local historian said that Joseph Smith, Sr. was also a member of the New Israelites and was one of its "leading rods-men". But although residents said that he lived in Poultney, Vermont, "at the time of the Wood movement here", there are no other records placing Smith closer than about 50 miles away. On the other hand, Smith's involvement with the New Israelites would be consistent with his links to Congregationalism and the report from James C. Brewster that in 1837 Smith, Sr. admitted that he entered the money digging business "more than thirty years" ago.

=== Cowdery and View of the Hebrews ===
For several years, Cowdery and his family attended the Congregational Church in Poultney, Vermont, when its minister was the Rev. Ethan Smith, author of View of the Hebrews, an 1823 book suggesting that Native Americans were of Hebrew origin, a not uncommon speculation during the colonial and early national periods. In 2000, David Persuitte argued that Cowdery's knowledge of View of the Hebrews significantly contributed to the final version of the Book of Mormon, a connection first suggested as early as 1902. Fawn Brodie wrote that it "may never be proved that Joseph saw View of the Hebrews before writing the Book of Mormon, but the striking parallelisms between the two books hardly leave a case for mere coincidence." Richard Bushman and John W. Welch reject the connection and argue that there is little relationship between the contents of the two books.

=== LDS response ===
LDS scholar Daniel Peterson argues against the theory that Cowdery was a coauthor, noting that analysis of the manuscripts indicates that the Book of Mormon was primarily the product of Joseph Smith's dictation, rather than a collaborative effort — it contains aural errors, typical of a transcription process. Additionally, the Printer's Manuscript, which Cowdery assisted in producing, contains significant copyist errors in his handwriting, suggesting he was not fully aware of the book's content beforehand.

== Footnotes ==
Church of the Latter Day Saints titles Later renamed: Church of Jesus Christ of Latter Day Saints (1838)
First	Assistant Counselor in the First Presidency; September 3, 1837–April 11, 1838; With: Hyrum Smith; John Smith; Joseph Smith, Sr.	Succeeded by Joseph Smith, Sr. John Smith
First	Assistant President of the Church; December 5, 1834–April 11, 1838	Succeeded by Hyrum Smith
Church of Christ titles Later renamed: Church of the Latter Day Saints (1834)
First	Second Elder of the Church; April 6, 1830–December 5, 1834	Title Discontinued
