= Far West, Missouri =

Former Mormon settlement in Missouri, abandoned after the Missouri Mormon War

Far West
- Town
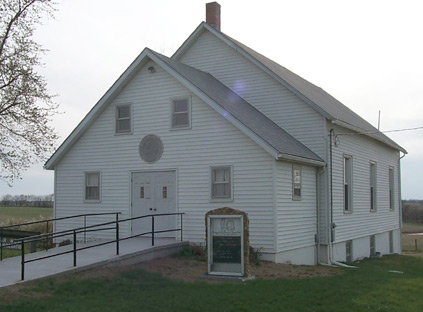
- Community of Christ chapel in Far West

- Location within Missouri Location within the United States
- Coordinates: 39°40′16″N 94°07′54″W
- Elevation: 292 m (958 ft)
- GNIS feature ID: 0738427
- Far West
- U.S. National Register of Historic Places
- Location: 5.5 miles (8.9 km) west of Kingston via County Roads D and H, near Kingston, Missouri
- Area: 640 acres (260 ha)
- Built: 1836
- NRHP reference No.: 70000324
- Added to NRHP: September 22, 1970

Far West Temple
- Efforts halted in 1830s
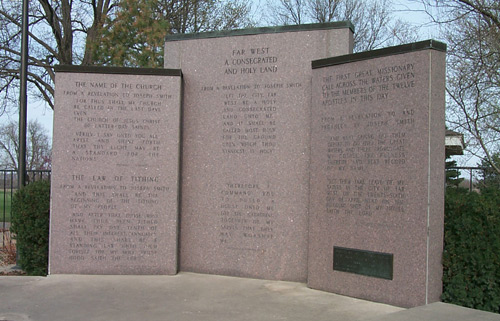
- Monument at the temple site in Far West.
- Interactive map of Far West Temple
- Site: 640 acres (260 ha)
- Official website • News & images

Additional information
- Announced: April 16, 1838, by Joseph Smith
- Groundbreaking: July 4, 1838, by Quorum of the Twelve
- Location: Far West, Caldwell County, Missouri, United States
- Notes: Site Dedicated. Cornerstones laid and dedicated July 4, 1838. Efforts discontinued in 1800s. The cornerstones remain, covered in glass, as part of a memorial park at the site.

Far West was a settlement of the Latter Day Saint movement in Caldwell County, Missouri, United States, during the late 1830s. It is recognized as a historic site by the U.S. National Register of Historic Places, added to the register in 1970. It is owned and maintained by the Church of Jesus Christ of Latter-day Saints.

== Foundation and early history ==
The town was founded by Missouri leaders of the church W. W. Phelps and John Whitmer in August 1836 shortly before the county's creation. The town was platted originally as a 1-mile (1.6 km) square area, centered on a public square which was to house a temple. The design of the town resembled the plan of Joseph Smith Jr. (the prophet of the restoration of The Church of Jesus Christ) for the City of Zion, which had been planned to be built in the town of Independence, Missouri. As the town of Far West grew, the plat was extended to 4 square miles (10 km^{2}).

Latter-day Saints first entered Missouri when four of them were called to serve missions there soon after the church was organized in 1830. According to a revelation recorded by Joseph Smith Jr., Independence would be the "centerplace" of the City of Zion when Jesus returned. However, disputes between early members of the church and Missourian settlers in Independence led to the expulsion of the early members of the church from Jackson County in 1833. Most temporarily settled in Clay County, Missouri. Towards the end of 1836, Caldwell County was created specifically for a settlement of members of the church to compensate property losses in Jackson County. Shortly after the creation of Caldwell County, Far West was made the county seat.

Far West became the headquarters of the church in early 1838 when Joseph Smith and Sidney Rigdon relocated to the town from the previous church headquarters in Kirtland, Ohio. The city grew to about 5,000 people. Joseph Smith taught that the Garden of Eden had been in Jackson County and when Adam and Eve were expelled from the Garden, they moved to the area now comprising Caldwell and Daviess Counties, Missouri. While headquartered in Far West, the official name of the church was changed to The Church of Jesus Christ of Latter Day Saints, after previously being known as the Church of Christ from 1830 to 1834 and as the Church of the Latter Day Saints, and variations of that name, since 1834. Reed Peck, a very early convert to the church, wrote in 1839 that Joseph Smith said that Far West was where Cain slew Abel.

== Missourian conflict of 1838 ==
New problems erupted when members of the church began to settle in the counties surrounding Caldwell, including De Witt in Carroll County and Adam-ondi-Ahman in Daviess County. Fear that the growing number of Saints would outnumber the local citizens combined with misunderstandings regarding the doctrine, purposes, and practices of the church to create a series of escalating conflicts which led the Governor of Missouri to eventually call out 2,500 state militiamen to put down what he alleged to be a "Mormon rebellion". He also issued an extermination order to rid the state of the church. Terrified, members of the church poured into Far West for protection and found themselves under siege. Joseph Smith Jr., his brother Hyrum, and others surrendered to the Missouri authorities at the end of October 1838, hoping to alleviate the persecution on the main church body of members, but were put on trial by the state for treason. Joseph and his company escaped when guards moving them to a new venue got drunk. The main body of the church was then forced illegally to sign over their property in Far West and Caldwell County to pay for the militia muster and leave the state. The main body eventually settled in Nauvoo, Illinois.

== Aftermath and Far West today ==
Far West became a ghost town soon after the departure of most of the church population. The county seat was moved to Kingston, Missouri, and many of the log houses in Far West were relocated. John Whitmer, having left the church, decided to remain in Far West and paid reduced prices for the properties of the fleeing Saints, cobbling together a large farm there.

The Church of Jesus Christ of Latter-day Saints purchased the temple site and some of the surrounding area in 1909. Since then, Far West has been maintained as a historic site. It is located 7 miles (11 km) south of U.S. Route 36 on Missouri Route D. The site includes the cornerstones of the planned temple, each encased in glass, and a monument to the early settlers that was dedicated in 1968. The church also honors the Far West legacy in the name of a ward located in Cameron and, since 2015, a stake centered in Gallatin.

Community of Christ, formerly known as the Reorganized Church of Jesus Christ of Latter Day Saints, owns and uses a chapel across the road from the historic site.

In May 2012, The Church of Jesus Christ of Latter-day Saints confirmed that it purchased 6,000 acres (2,400 ha) of Missouri farmland and three historical sites from Community of Christ, including land around Far West.

== See also ==
- List of ghost towns in Missouri
- National Register of Historic Places listings in Caldwell County, Missouri

== Additional Reading ==
- Alexander L. Baugh, A Call to Arms: The 1838 Mormon Defense of Northern Missouri, BYU Studies, 2000.
- John Hamer, Northeast of Eden: A Historical Atlas of Missouri's Mormon County, Far West Cultural Center, 2004.
- Stephen C. LeSueur, The 1838 Mormon War in Missouri, University of Missouri Press, 1990.
