= Smith family (Latter Day Saints) =

Family

The Smith family is the name of an American family with many members prominent in religion and politics. The family's most famous member was Joseph Smith Jr., founder of the Latter Day Saint movement. Many other members of the family took on leadership roles in various churches within the movement.

== First generation ==
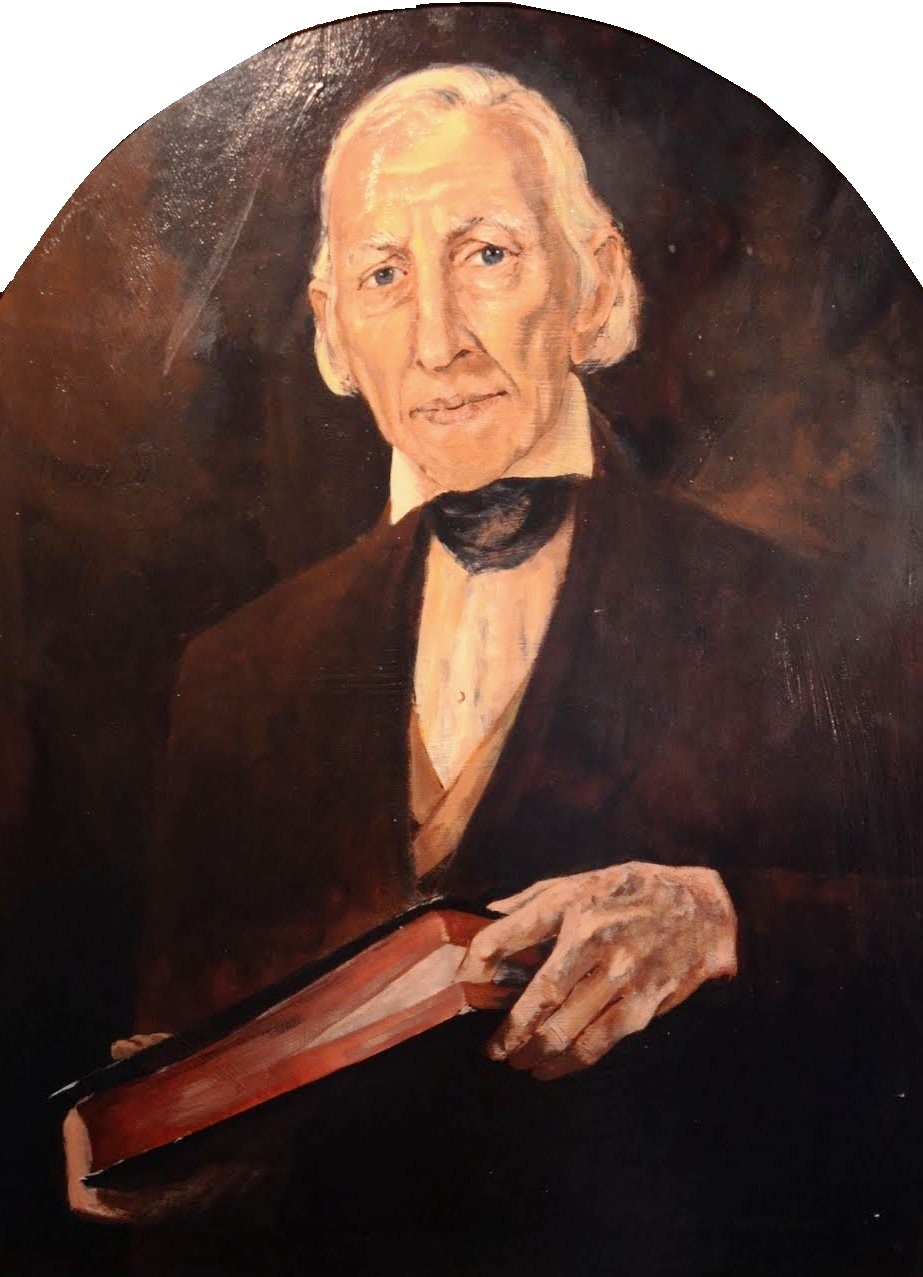
Joseph Smith, Sr

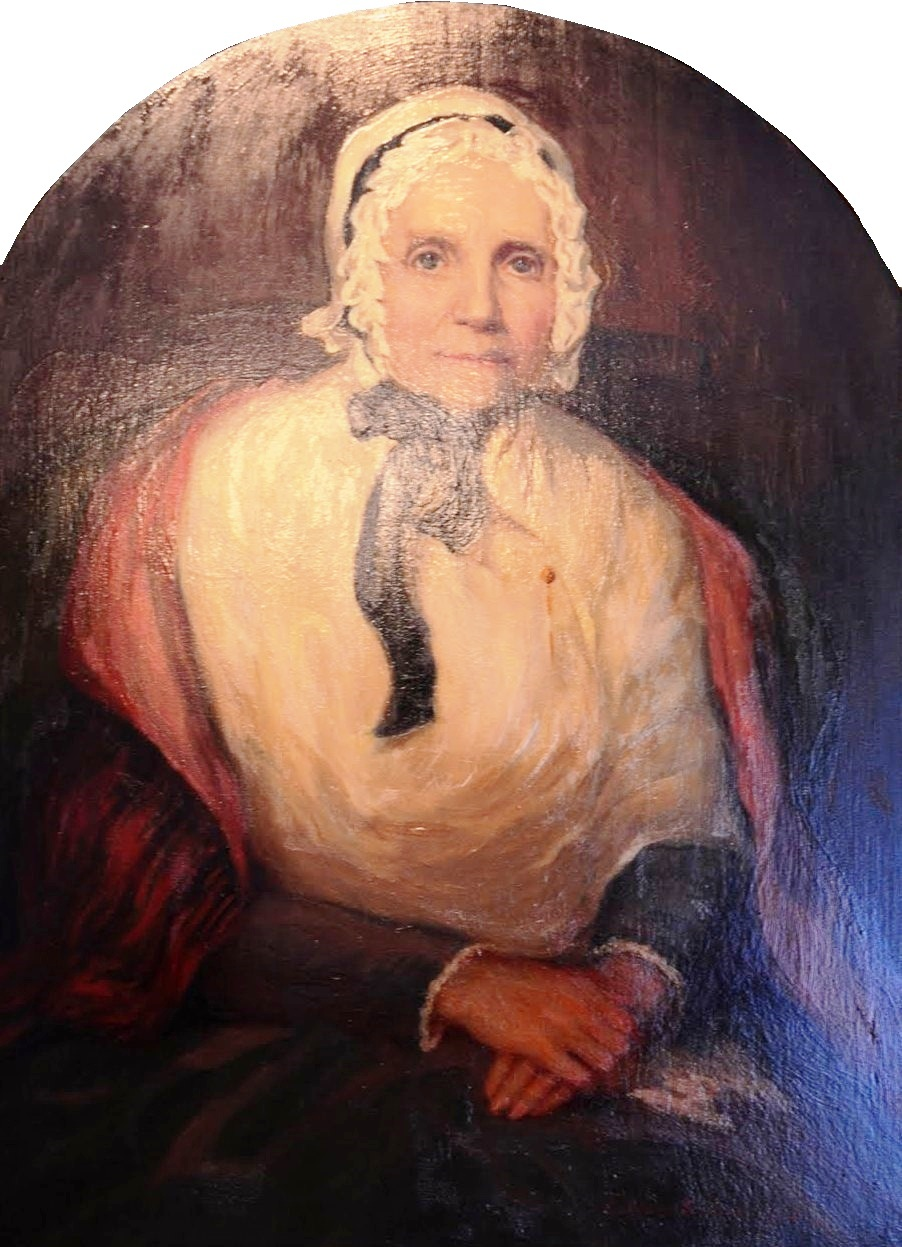
Lucy Mack Smith

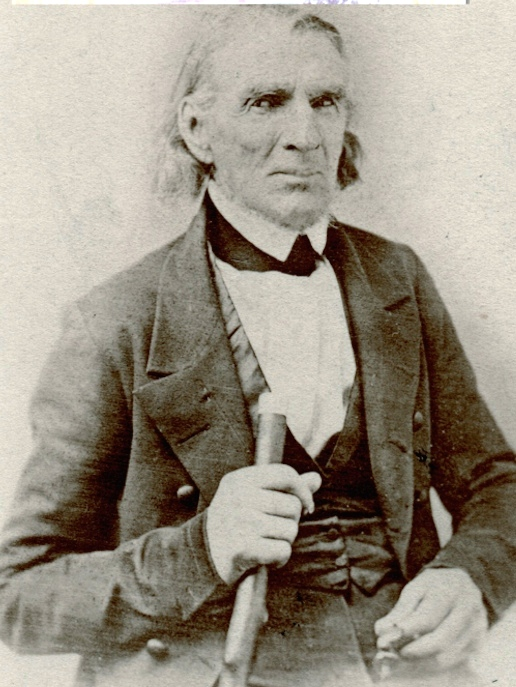
John Smith

=== Joseph Smith Sr. ===
- Lived 1771–1840
- Married: Lucy Mack in 1795
- Father of Alvin, Hyrum, Sophronia, Joseph Jr., Samuel, Ephraim, William, Catherine or Katharine, Don Carlos, and Lucy (see Joseph Smith-History 1:4 and “Family of Joseph Smith, Sr. and Lucy Mack Smith: First Family of the Restoration,” December 2005 Ensign magazine)
- brother of John Smith

=== Lucy Mack Smith ===
- Lived 1775–1856
- Married: Joseph Smith Sr. in 1795
- Mother of Alvin, Hyrum, Sophronia, Joseph Jr., Samuel, Ephraim, William, Catherine or Katharine, Don Carlos, and Lucy (see Joseph Smith-History 1:4 and “Family of Joseph Smith, Sr. and Lucy Mack Smith: First Family of the Restoration,” December 2005 Ensign magazine)

=== John Smith ===
- Lived: 1781–1854
- brother of Joseph Smith Sr.
- father of George A. Smith

== Second generation: children of Joseph Smith Sr. and Lucy Mack ==
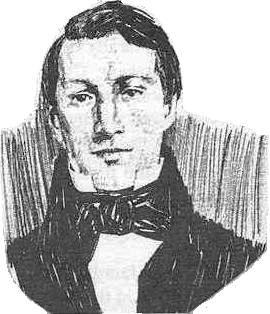
Alvin Smith

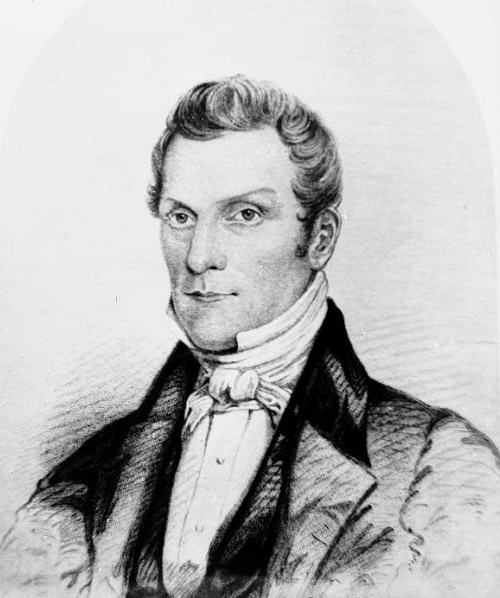
Hyrum Smith

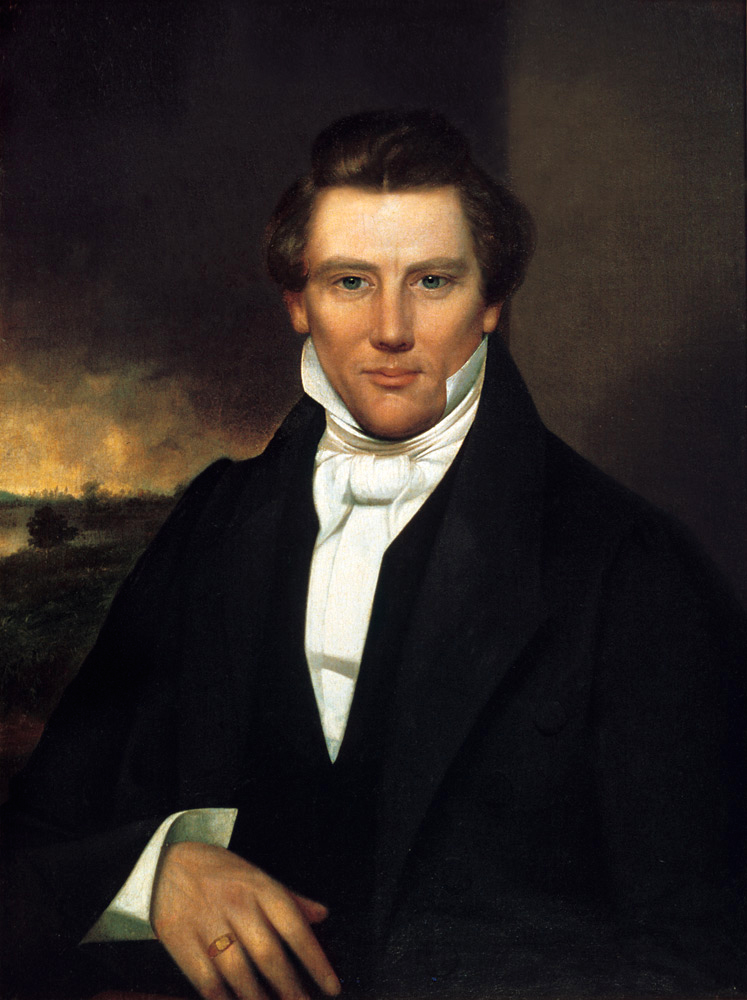
Joseph Smith Jr.

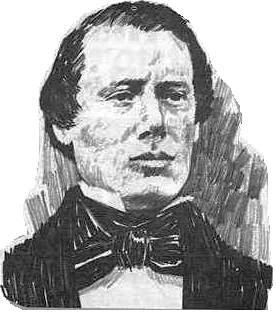
Samuel H. Smith

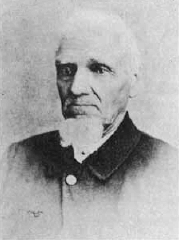
William Smith

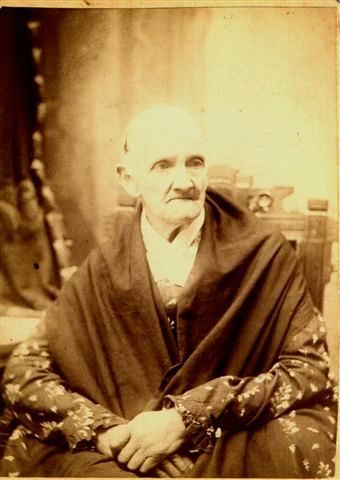
Katharine Smith Salisbury

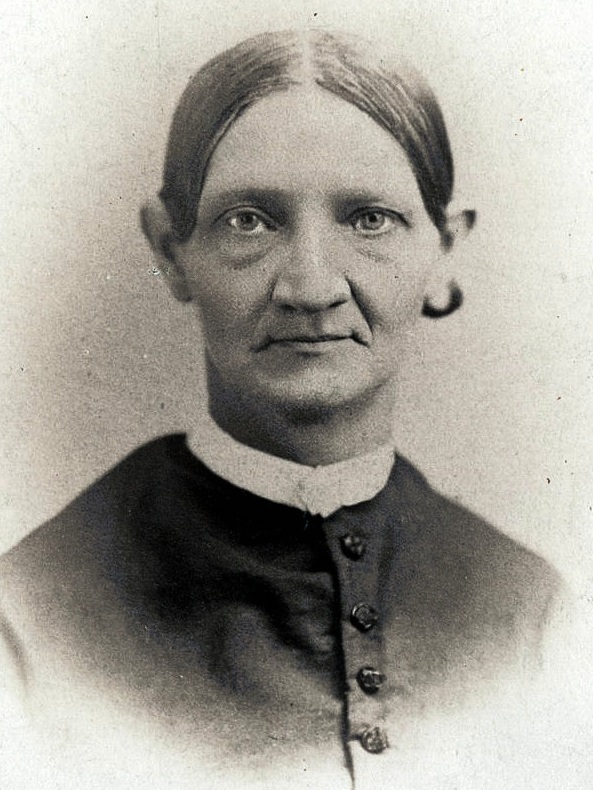
Lucy Smith Millikin

=== Alvin Smith ===
- Lived: 1798–1823
- Oldest child of Joseph Smith Sr. and Lucy Mack Smith
- Brother of Hyrum Smith, Sophronia Smith McCleary, Joseph Smith Jr., Samuel H. Smith, William Smith, Katharine Smith Salisbury, Don Carlos Smith, and Lucy Smith Millikin

=== Hyrum Smith ===
- Lived: 1800–1844
- Second son of Joseph Smith Sr. and Lucy Mack Smith
- Brother of Alvin Smith, Sophronia Smith McCleary, Joseph Smith Jr., Samuel H. Smith, William Smith, Katharine Smith Salisbury, Don Carlos Smith, and Lucy Smith Millikin

=== Sophronia Smith McCleary ===
- Lived: 1803–1876
- Oldest daughter of Joseph Smith Sr. and Lucy Mack Smith
- Sister of Alvin Smith, Hyrum Smith, Joseph Smith Jr., Samuel H. Smith, William Smith, Katharine Smith Salisbury, Don Carlos Smith, and Lucy Smith Millikin
- Married: Calvin W. Stoddard in 1827. Husband died 1836.
- Married: William McCleary in 1838.

=== Joseph Smith Jr. ===
- Lived: 1805–1844
- Founder of The Church of Jesus Christ of Latter-day Saints Latter Day Saint movement
- Mayor of Nauvoo, Illinois 1842–44
- Candidate for President of the United States 1844
- son of Joseph Smith Sr. and Lucy Mack Smith
- Brother of Alvin Smith, Hyrum Smith, Sophronia Smith McCleary, Samuel H. Smith, William Smith, Katharine Smith Salisbury, Don Carlos Smith, and Lucy Smith Millikin
- Father of Joseph Smith III
- Married: Emma Hale in 1827

=== Samuel H. Smith ===
- Lived: 1808–1844
- Brother of Alvin Smith, Hyrum Smith, Sophronia Smith McCleary, Joseph Smith Jr., William Smith, Katharine Smith Salisbury, Don Carlos Smith, and Lucy Smith Millikin

=== William Smith ===
- Lived: 13 March 1811 – 13 November 1894
- Illinois State Legislature 1842
- Brother of Alvin Smith, Hyrum Smith, Sophronia Smith McCleary, Joseph Smith Jr., Samuel H. Smith, Katharine Smith Salisbury, Don Carlos Smith, and Lucy Smith Millikin
- Married: Caroline Amanda Grant, sister of Jedidiah Morgan Grant and Roxie Ann Grant
- Married: Roxie Ann Grant after her sister Caroline's death

=== Katharine Smith Salisbury ===
- Lived: July 8, 1813 – February 1, 1900
- Sister of Alvin Smith, Hyrum Smith, Sophronia Smith McCleary, Joseph Smith Jr., Samuel H. Smith, William Smith, Don Carlos Smith, and Lucy Smith Millikin
- Married: Wilkins Jenkins Salisbury (died 1853) (1831)
- Married: Joseph Younger (later divorced) (1857)

=== Don Carlos Smith ===
- Lived: 1816–1841
- Brother of Alvin Smith, Hyrum Smith, Sophronia Smith McCleary, Joseph Smith Jr., Samuel H. Smith, William Smith, Katharine Smith Salisbury, and Lucy Smith Millikin

=== Lucy Smith Millikin ===
- Lived 1821–1882
- Sister of Alvin Smith, Hyrum Smith, Sophronia Smith McCleary, Joseph Smith Jr., Samuel H. Smith, William Smith, Don Carlos Smith, and Katharine Smith Salisbury
- Married Arthur Millikin.

== Second generation: cousins to the Smiths ==
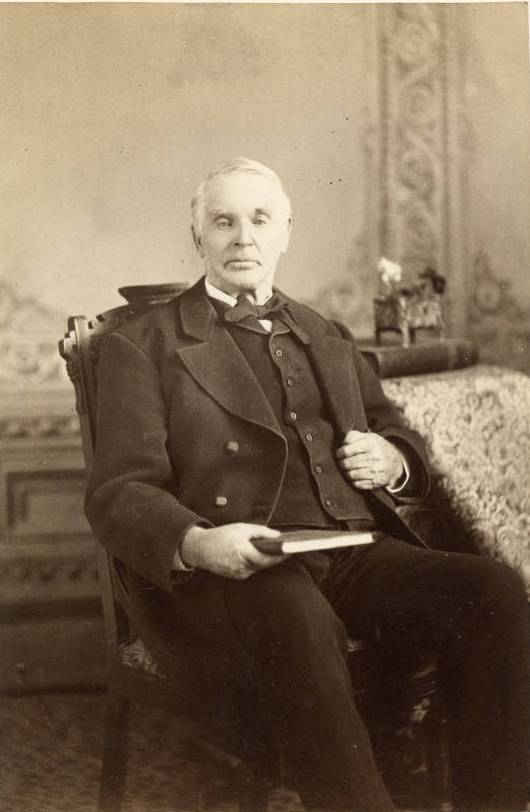
Elias Smith

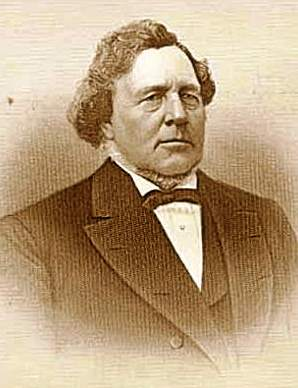
George A. Smith

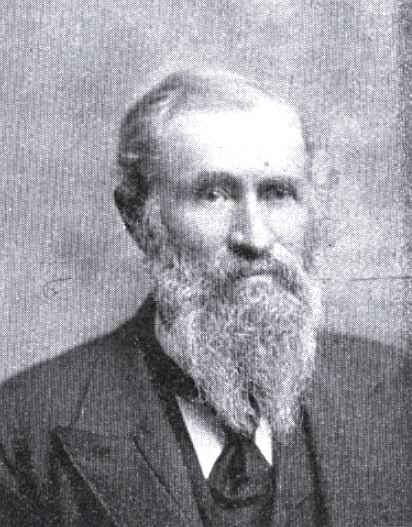
Silas Sanford Smith

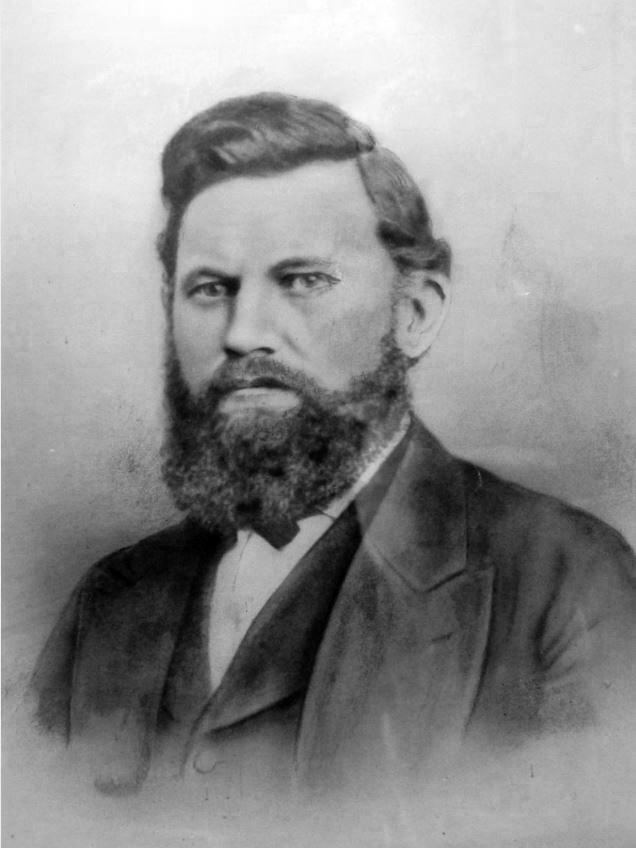
Jesse N. Smith

The following individuals were children of brothers of Joseph Smith Sr. They were first-cousins to Alvin Smith, Hyrum Smith, Joseph Smith Jr., Samuel H. Smith, William Smith, and Don Carlos Smith

=== Elias Smith ===
- Lived: 1804–1888
- son of Asael Smith Jr. and Elizabeth Schellenger

=== George A. Smith ===
- Lived: 26 June 1817 – 1 September 1875
- Utah Territorial Legislature 1851, 1867; Utah Territorial Supreme Court 1855, Utah Territory delegate to U.S. Congress 1856
- Son of John Smith
- Father of John Henry Smith

=== Silas S. Smith ===
- Lived: 26 October 1830 – 11 October 1910
- Utah Territorial Legislature 1859, 69, 78
- Son of Silas Smith Sr.
- Brother of Jesse Nathaniel Smith

=== Jesse N. Smith ===
- Lived: 2 December 1834 – 5 June 1906
- Mayor of Parowan, Utah 1859; Arizona Territorial Legislature 19th Session
- Son of Silas Smith Sr.
- Brother of Silas S. Smith
- His daughter, Leah, married John Hunt Udall, mayor of Phoenix, AZ
- His son Asahel Henry Smith married Pauline Udall, daughter of David King Udall

=== John Lyman Smith ===
- Lived 17 November 1828 – 21 February 1898
- Utah Territorial Legislature 1852, 1853; 1853–1855
- Son of John Smith

== Third generation: children of Hyrum Smith ==
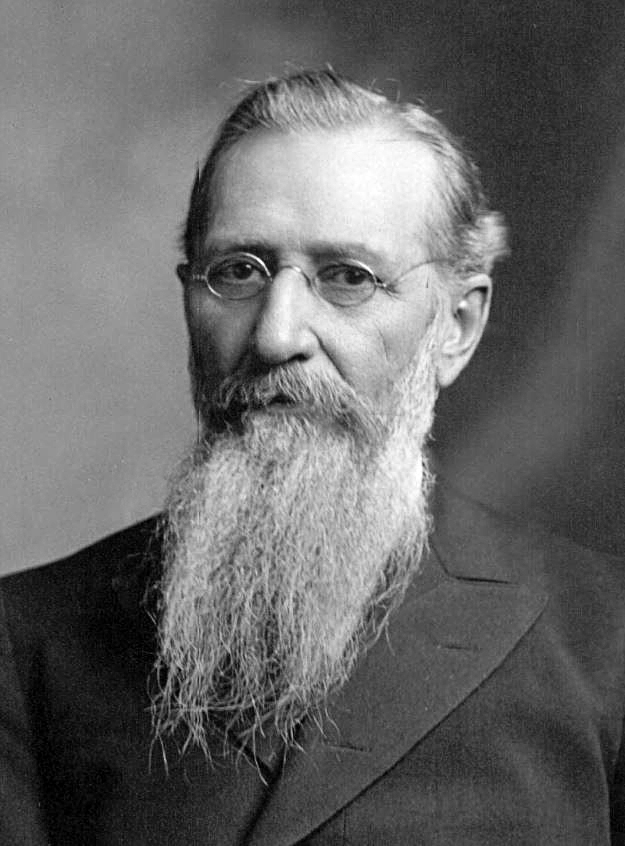
Joseph F. Smith

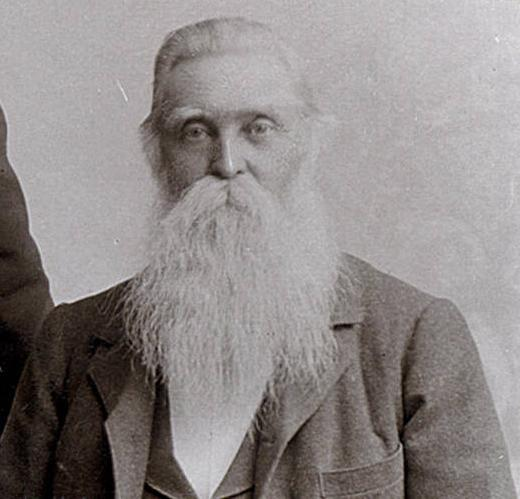
John Smith

=== Joseph F. Smith ===
- Lived: 13 November 1838 – 19 November 1918
- Utah Territorial Legislature 1865–70, 1872, 1874, 1880, 1882
- President of The Church of Jesus Christ of Latter-day Saints, 1901–1918
- Son of Hyrum Smith and Mary Fielding (who remarried to Heber C. Kimball after Hyrum's death)
- half-brother of John Smith

=== John Smith ===
- Lived: 1832–1911
- son of Hyrum Smith and Jerusha Barden
- half-brother of Joseph F. Smith

== Third generation: children of Joseph Smith Jr. ==
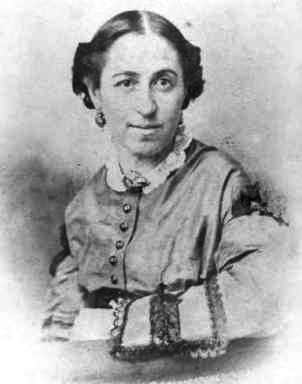
Julia Murdock Smith

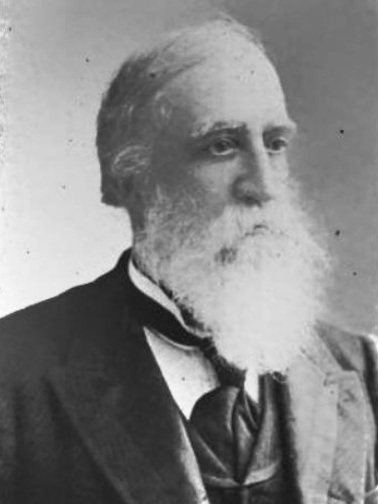
Joseph Smith III

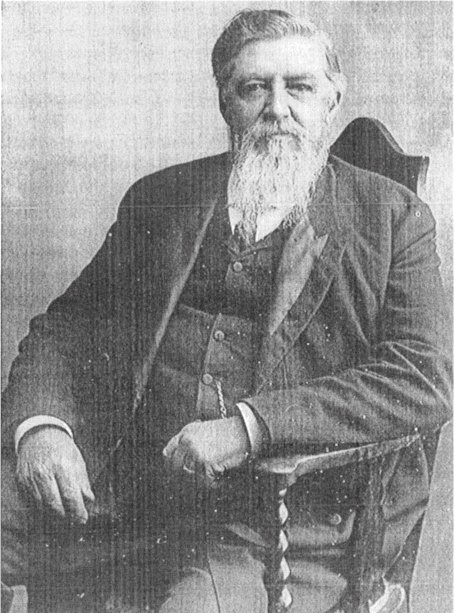
Alexander Hale Smith

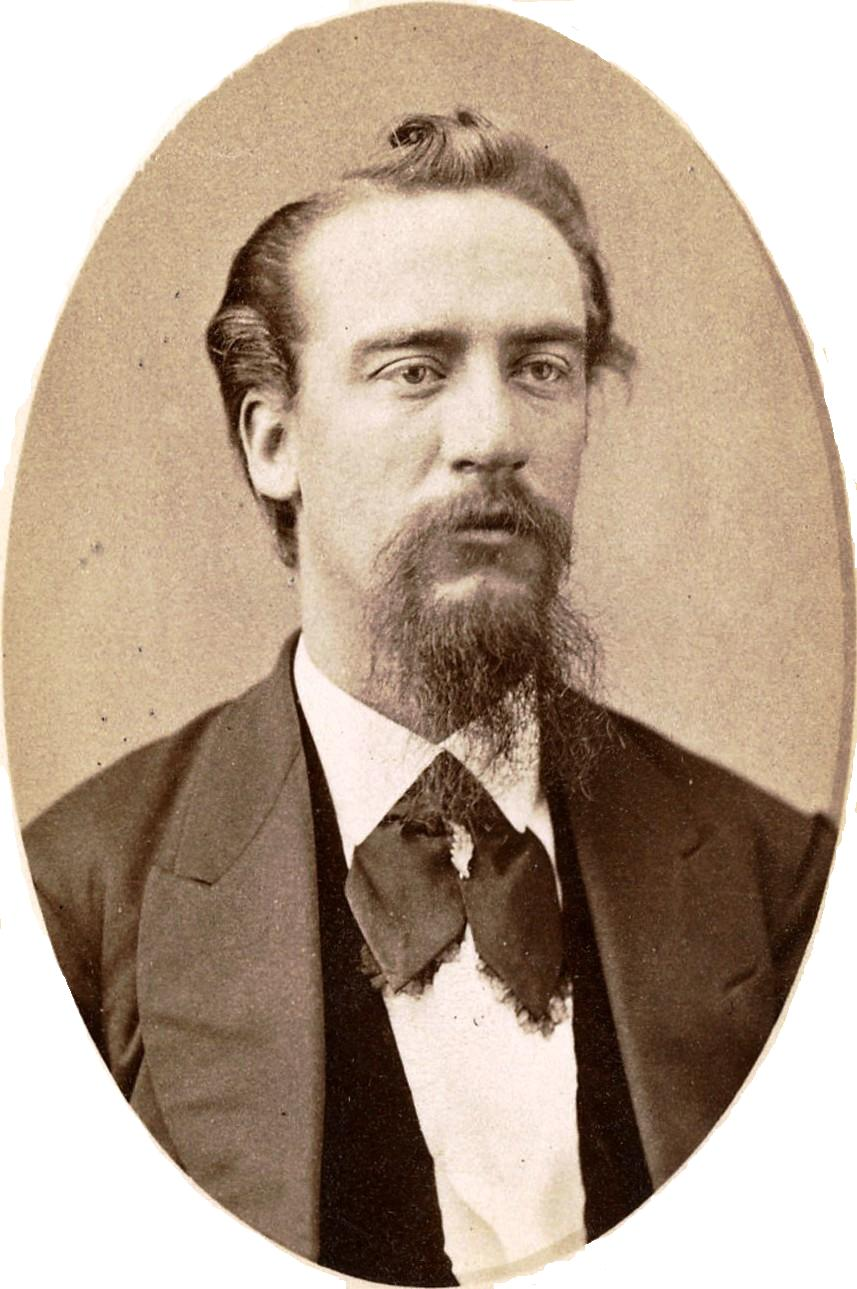
David Hyrum Smith

=== Julia Murdock Smith ===
- Lived: 1830–1880
- adopted daughter of Joseph Smith Jr. and Emma Hale
- sister of Joseph Smith III, Alexander Hale Smith, and David Hyrum Smith

=== Joseph Smith III ===
- Lived: 6 November 1832 – 10 December 1914
- Prophet–President of the Reorganized Church of Jesus Christ of Latter Day Saints (now Community of Christ) for 54 years
- Founder of Lamoni, Iowa
- Founder of Graceland University
- Three sons succeeded him as Prophet–President of the Reorganized Church of Jesus Christ of Latter Day Saints - Frederick Madison Smith, Israel A. Smith and W. Wallace Smith.
- Son of Joseph Smith Jr. and Emma Hale
- Brother of Julia Murdock Smith, Alexander Hale Smith, and David Hyrum Smith
- Nephew of Hyrum Smith
- 1st cousin of Joseph F. Smith
- 1st Cousin once removed of Utah Judge Elias Smith Sr
- Married: Emmeline Griswold in 1854 and had five children
- Married: Bertha Madison in 1869, after the death of Emmeline Griswold, and had nine children
- Married: Ada Clark in 1898, after the death of Bertha Madison, and had three children

=== Alexander Hale Smith ===
- Lived: 1838–1909
- Son of Joseph Smith Jr. and Emma Hale
- Brother of Julia Murdock Smith, Joseph Smith III, and David Hyrum Smith

=== David Hyrum Smith ===
- Lived: 1844–1904
- Son of Joseph Smith Jr. and Emma Hale
- Brother of Julia Murdock Smith, Joseph Smith III, and Alexander Hale Smith

== Third generation: children of Don Carlos Smith ==
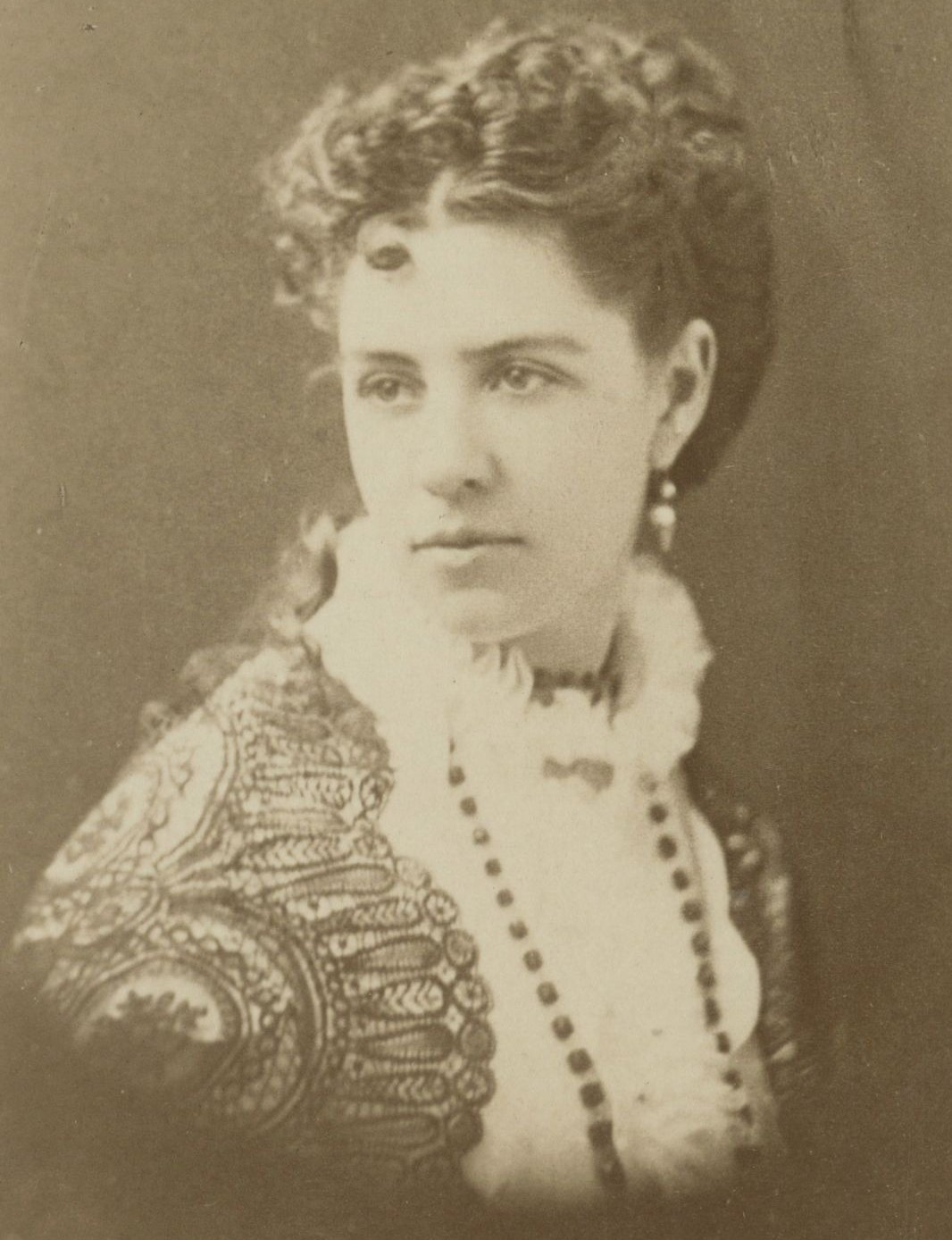
Ina Coolbrith

=== Ina Coolbrith (born Josephine Anna Smith) ===
- Lived: 1841–1928
- daughter of Don Carlos Smith and Agnes Moulton Coolbrith

== Third generation: children of Smith cousins ==
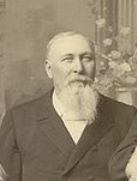
John Henry Smith

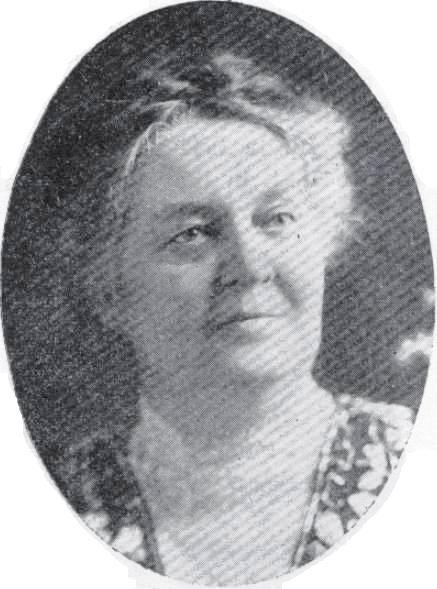
Clarissa Smith Williams

=== John Henry Smith ===
- Lived: 18 September 1848 – 13 October 1911
- Utah Territorial Legislature 1882
- Son of George A. Smith
- Half-brother of Clarissa Smith Williams

=== Clarissa Smith Williams ===
- Lived: 1859–1930
- Daughter of George A. Smith and Susan West
- Half-sister of John Henry Smith

== Fourth generation: descended from Hyrum Smith ==
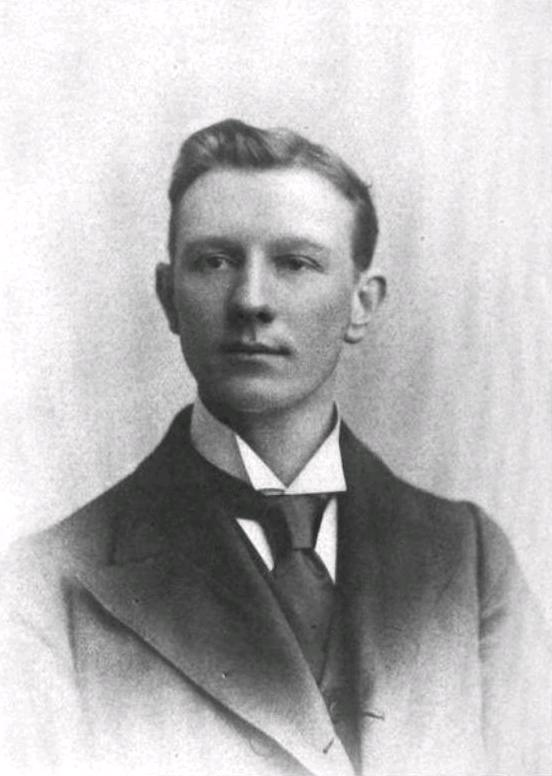
Hyrum M. Smith

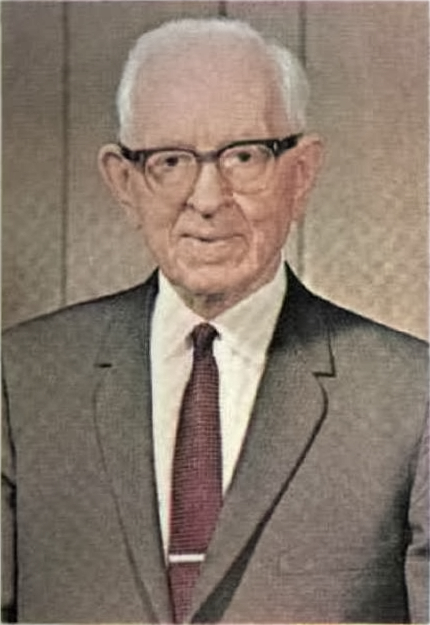
Joseph Fielding Smith

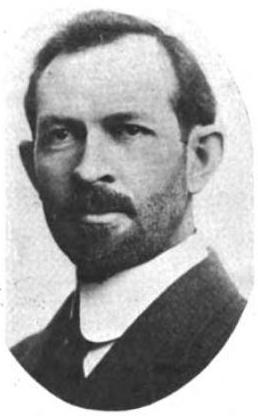
David A. Smith

=== Hyrum M. Smith ===
- Lived: 1872–1918
- Son of Joseph F. Smith, grandson of Hyrum Smith
- Brother of Joseph Fielding Smith and David A. Smith

=== Joseph Fielding Smith ===
- Lived: 1876–1972
- Son of Joseph F. Smith, grandson of Hyrum Smith
- Brother of Hyrum M. Smith and David A. Smith
- President of The Church of Jesus Christ of Latter-day Saints, 1970–1972

=== David A. Smith ===
- Lived: 1879–1952
- Son of Joseph F. Smith, grandson of Hyrum Smith
- Brother of Hyrum M. Smith and Joseph Fielding Smith

== Fourth generation: descended from Joseph Smith Jr. ==
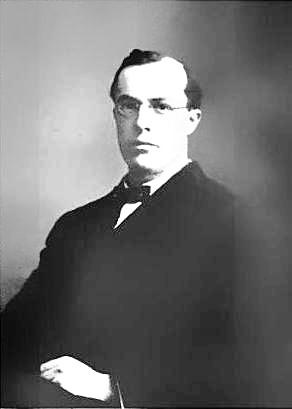
Frederick M. Smith

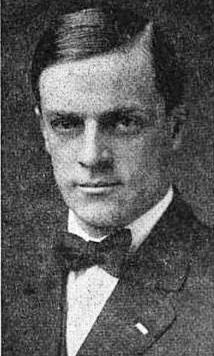
Israel A. Smith

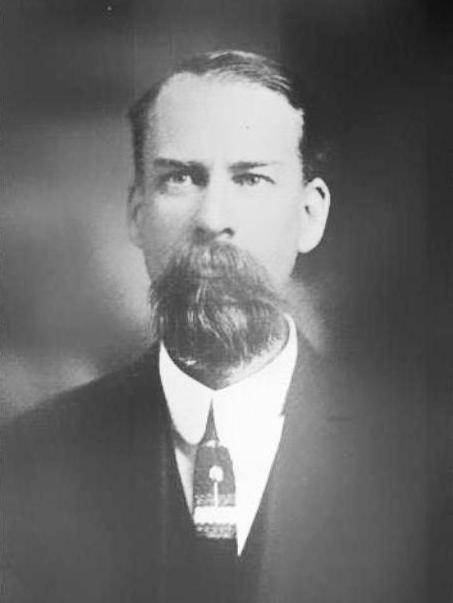
Elbert A. Smith

=== Frederick M. Smith ===
- Lived: 1874–1946
- Son of Joseph Smith III, grandson of Joseph Smith Jr.
- Brother of Israel A. Smith and W. Wallace Smith
- Prophet–President of the Reorganized Church of Jesus Christ of Latter Day Saints, 1915–1946

=== Israel A. Smith ===
- Lived: 2 February 1876 – 14 June 1958
- Iowa State Legislature 1911-1913
- Elected as delegate to the Missouri Constitutional Convention, 1943–1944
- Prophet–President of the Reorganized Church of Jesus Christ of Latter Day Saints, 1946–1958
- Son of Joseph Smith III, grandson of Joseph Smith Jr.
- Brother of Frederick M. Smith and W. Wallace Smith
- Married: Nina Grenawalt in 1908, and had two sons

=== W. Wallace Smith ===
- Lived: 1900–1989
- Son of Joseph Smith III, grandson of Joseph Smith Jr.
- Brother of Frederick M. Smith and Israel A. Smith
- Prophet–President of the Reorganized Church of Jesus Christ of Latter Day Saints, 1958–1978

=== Emma Smith Kennedy ===
- Lived: 1869–1960
- Daughter of Alexander Hale Smith, granddaughter of Joseph Smith Jr.

=== Elbert A. Smith ===
- Lived: 1871–1959
- Son of David Hyrum Smith, grandson of Joseph Smith Jr.

== Fourth generation: descended from Smith cousins ==
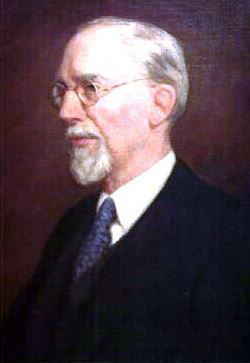
George Albert Smith

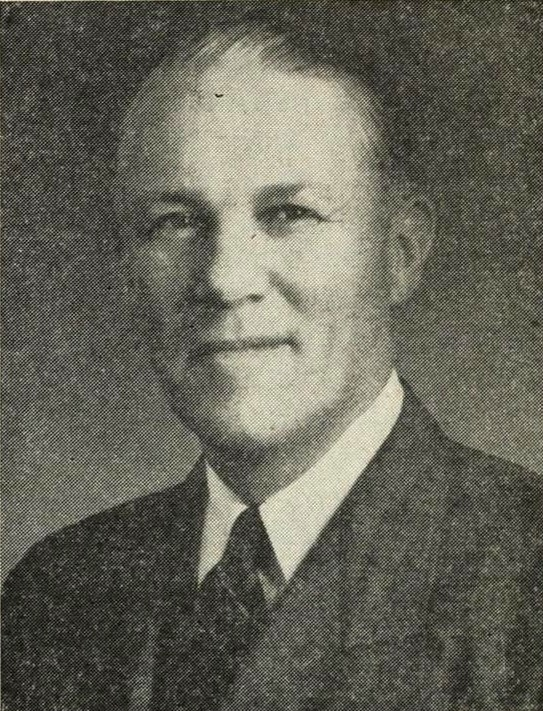
Nicholas G. Smith

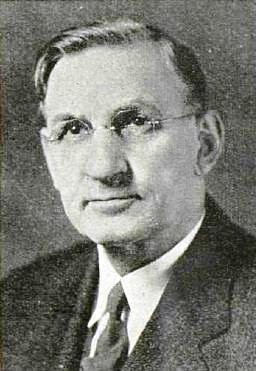
Richard R. Lyman

=== George Albert Smith ===
- Lived: 1870–1951
- Son of John Henry Smith and Sarah Farr
- Half-brother of Nicholas G. Smith
- President of The Church of Jesus Christ of Latter-day Saints, 1945–1951

=== Nicholas G. Smith ===
- Lived: 1881–1945
- Son of John Henry Smith and Josephine Groesbeck
- Half-brother of George Albert Smith

=== Richard R. Lyman ===
- Lived: 1870–1963
- Son of Francis M. Lyman and Clara Caroline Callister, a granddaughter of John Smith

== Fifth generation: descended from Hyrum Smith ==
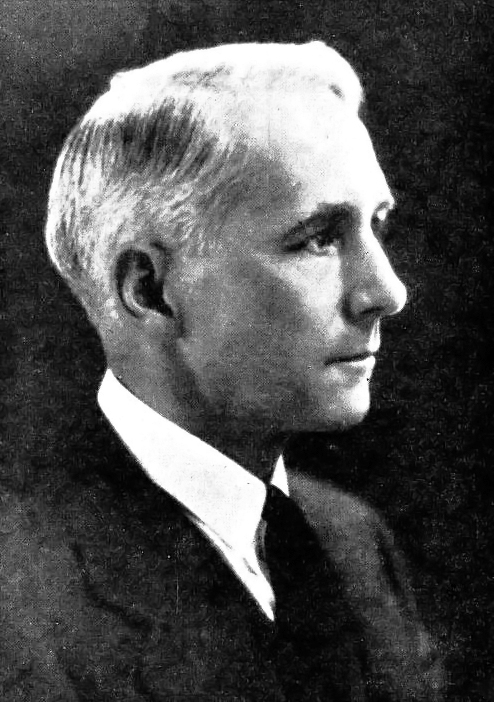
Hyrum G. Smith

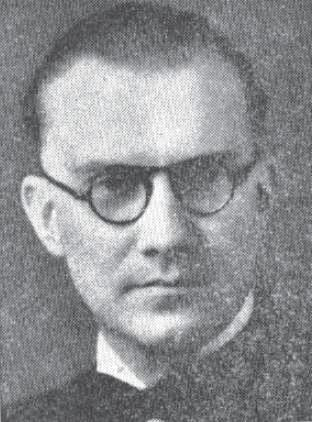
Joseph Fielding Smith

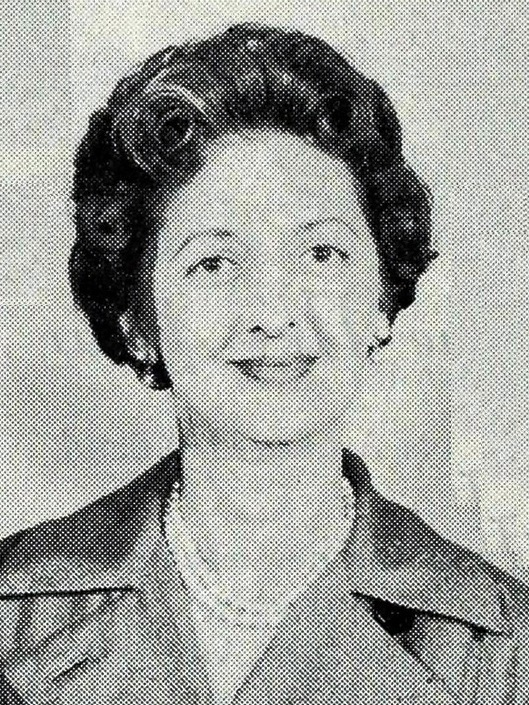
Florence S. Jacobsen

=== Hyrum G. Smith ===
- Lived: 1879–1932
- grandson of John Smith, great-grandson of Hyrum Smith

=== Joseph Fielding Smith ===
- Lived: 1899–1964
- son of Hyrum M. Smith, grandson of Joseph F. Smith, great-grandson of Hyrum Smith

=== Florence Smith Jacobsen ===
- Lived: 1913–2017
- daughter of Willard Richards Smith, granddaughter of Joseph F. Smith, great-granddaughter of Hyrum Smith

== Fifth generation: descended from Joseph Smith Jr. ==
=== Wallace B. Smith ===
- Lived: 1929–2023
- son of W. Wallace Smith, grandson of Joseph Smith III, great-grandson of Joseph Smith Jr.
- Prophet–President of the Reorganized Church of Jesus Christ of Latter Day Saints, 1978–1996

== Fifth generation: descended from Smith cousins ==
=== George Albert Smith Jr. ===
- Lived: 1905–1969
- son of George Albert Smith, grandson of John Henry Smith, great-grandson of George A. Smith

== Later generations ==
=== Descended from Hyrum Smith ===
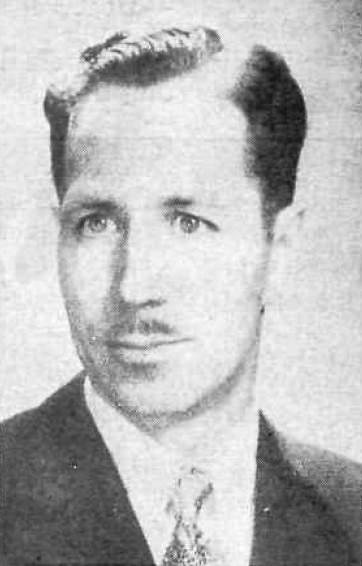
Eldred G. Smith

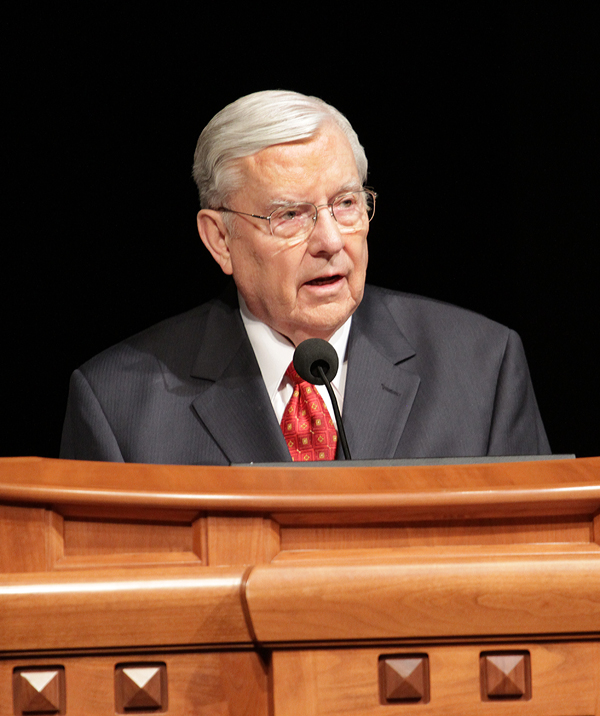
M. Russell Ballard

==== Eldred G. Smith ====
- Lived: 1907–2013
- son of Hyrum G. Smith, great-grandson of John Smith, great-great-grandson of Hyrum Smith

==== M. Russell Ballard ====
- Lived: 1928–2023
- grandson of Hyrum M. Smith, great-grandson of Joseph F. Smith, great-great-grandson of Hyrum Smith

==== Joseph Fielding McConkie ====
- Lived: 1941–2013
- grandson of Joseph Fielding Smith, great-grandson of Joseph F. Smith, great-great-grandson of Hyrum Smith

=== Descended from Smith cousins ===
==== Jeff Groscost ====
- Died: November 3, 2006
- Arizona State Legislature 1992–2000 (speaker in 1998)
- 3rd Great grandson of Jesse Nathaniel Smith

== See also ==
- List of descendants of Joseph Smith Sr. and Lucy Mack Smith
- Latter Day Saint political history
