= List of descendants of Joseph Smith Sr. and Lucy Mack Smith =

This is a list of the descendants of Joseph Smith Sr. and Lucy Mack Smith, the founding family of the Latter Day Saint movement.

== Joseph Smith Sr. and Lucy Mack Smith ==
Name	Birth Date	Birth Place	Death Date	Death Place	Notes
Joseph Smith Sr.	July 12, 1771	Topsfield, Massachusetts	September 14, 1840	Nauvoo, Illinois	Born to Asael Smith and Mary Duty. At the age of 24, he married Lucy Mack in Tunbridge, Vermont on January 24, 1795. He was one of the Eight Witnesses of the Book of Mormon's Golden Plates and was the first Presiding Patriarch of the early Latter Day Saint church.
Lucy Mack Smith	July 8, 1775	Gilsum, New Hampshire	May 14, 1856	Nauvoo, Illinois	Born to Solomon Mack (a Revolutionary War veteran) and Lydia Gates. She was 20 when she married Joseph Smith Sr. She is perhaps best remembered for her biography of her son, Joseph Smith Jr.

=== Unnamed son ===
- A first son died in childbirth in 1797 in Tunbridge, VT.

=== Alvin Smith ===
Name	Birth Date	Birth Place	Death Date	Death Place	Notes
Alvin Smith	February 11, 1798	Tunbridge, VT	November 19, 1823	Palmyra, New York	Alvin Smith never married and had no descendants. Took a leading role in helping the Smith family work toward paying their debts and building their home. A vision claimed by his younger brother Joseph is said to have included Alvin and played a significant role in the establishment of the Mormon doctrine of redemption of those who die without a knowledge of the gospel and baptism of the dead.

=== Hyrum Smith ===
Name	Birth Date	Birth Place	Death Date	Death Place	Notes
Hyrum Smith	February 9, 1800	Tunbridge, VT	June 27, 1844	Carthage, Illinois	As of 2005, had an estimated 13,583 known descendants. He is perhaps best remembered for being killed with his brother Joseph Smith Jr. in Carthage Jail.
Marriage to Jerusha Barden, November 2, 1826 in Manchester, New York
Jerusha Barden	February 15, 1805	Norfolk, Connecticut	October 13, 1837	Kirtland, Ohio	
Children
Lovina Smith Walker	September 16, 1827	Manchester, New York	October 8, 1876	Farmington, Utah Territory	
Mary Smith	June 27, 1829	Manchester, New York	May 29, 1832	Kirtland, Ohio	
John Smith	September 22, 1832	Kirtland, Ohio	November 6, 1911	Salt Lake City, Utah	The fifth Presiding Patriarch of the Church of Jesus Christ of Latter-day Saints (LDS Church).
Hyrum Smith Jr.	April 27, 1834	Kirtland, Ohio	September 21, 1841	Nauvoo, Illinois	
Jerusha Smith	January 13, 1836	Kirtland, Ohio	June 27, 1912	Harper Ward, Utah	
Sarah Smith Griffin	October 2, 1837	Kirtland, Ohio	November 6, 1876	Ogden, Utah	
Marriage to Mary Fielding Smith, December 24, 1837 in Kirtland, Ohio
Mary Fielding Smith	July 21, 1801	Bedfordshire, England	September 21, 1852	Salt Lake City, Utah Territory	Remarried to Heber C. Kimball on September 14, 1844
Children
Joseph F. Smith	November 13, 1838	Far West, Missouri	November 19, 1918	Salt Lake City, Utah	The sixth president of the Church of Jesus Christ of Latter-day Saints (LDS Church) and last President of the Church to have personally known Joseph Smith Jr.
Martha Ann Smith	May 14, 1841	Nauvoo, Illinois	October 19, 1923	Provo, Utah	

=== Sophronia Smith ===
Name	Birth Date	Birth Place	Death Date	Death Place	Notes
Sophronia Smith	May 17, 1803	Tunbridge, VT	October 28, 1876	Colchester, Illinois	As of 2005, has five known descendants
Married to Calvin W. Stoddard, December 2, 1827 in Palmyra, New York
Calvin W. Stoddard	September 7, 1801	Groton, Connecticut	November 19, 1836	Macedon, New York	
Children
Eunice Stoddard	March 22, 1830	Palmyra, New York	June 24, 1831	Kirtland, Ohio	
Mariah Stoddard	April 12, 1832	Kirtland, Ohio	October 8, 1896	Colchester, Illinois	
Married to William McCleary, February 11, 1838 in Kirtland, Ohio
William McCleary	October 9, 1793	Rupert, Vermont	June 1846	Iowa	Sophronia and William had no children together.

=== Joseph Smith Jr. ===
Name	Birth Date	Birth Place	Death Date	Death Place	Notes
Joseph Smith Jr.	December 23, 1805	Sharon, Vermont	June 27, 1844	Carthage, Illinois	As of 2005, has 1112 known descendants
Marriage to Emma Hale, January 18, 1827 in South Bainbridge, New York
Emma Hale Smith	July 10, 1804	Harmony Township, Pennsylvania	May 30, 1879	Nauvoo, Illinois	Married to Joseph Smith Jr., until his death in 1844. She was the first president of the Ladies' Relief Society of Nauvoo, a women's service organization and was an early leader and member of the Reorganized Church of Jesus Christ of Latter Day Saints
Children
Alvin Smith	June 15, 1828	Harmony, Pennsylvania	June 15, 1828	Harmony, Pennsylvania	Died the same day as birth.
Thaddeus Smith	April 30, 1831	near Kirtland, Ohio	April 30, 1831	near Kirtland, Ohio	Died the same day as birth. Twin to Louisa Smith
Louisa Smith	April 30, 1831	near Kirtland, Ohio	April 30, 1831	near Kirtland, Ohio	Died the same day as birth. Twin to Thaddeus Smith
Joseph Murdock	May 1, 1831	Kirtland, Ohio	March 29, 1832	Hiram, Ohio	Adopted. Twin of Julia Murdock. His mother died in childbirth. On May 10, 1831, he was adopted by Joseph and Emma. Died before he reached his first birthday when a mob tarred and feathered his father, Joseph. The child died from exposure (many accounts say pneumonia) five days after the event from the condition that doctors said he developed the night of the mob violence.
Julia Murdock	May 1, 1831	Kirtland, Ohio	September 12, 1880	Nauvoo, Illinois	Adopted. Twin of Joseph Murdock. Married Elisha Dixon in 1849 in Nauvoo, Illinois. They were married four years when Elisha was killed in an accident in 1853 in Galveston, Texas. In 1855 she married John Middleton. After 20 years of marriage, they separated in 1877.
Joseph Smith, III	November 6, 1832	Kirtland, Ohio	December 10, 1914	Independence, Missouri	Joseph Smith III was the first Prophet–President of what became known as the Reorganized Church of Jesus Christ of Latter Day Saints.
Frederick Granger Williams Smith	June 20, 1836	Kirtland, Ohio	April 13, 1862	Nauvoo, Illinois	Frederick was never baptized into the Latter Day Saint movement. He married Anna Marie Jones on November 13, 1857. His only daughter, Alice Fredericka Smith never married and had no children, leaving no living descendants.
Alexander Hale Smith	June 2, 1838	Far West, Missouri	August 12, 1909	Nauvoo, Illinois	Married Elizabeth Agnes Kendall on June 23, 1861 He was an apostle and Presiding Patriarch of the Reorganized Church of Jesus Christ of Latter Day Saints.
Don Carlos Smith	June 13, 1840	Nauvoo, Illinois	September 15, 1841	Nauvoo, Illinois	Died at age 1.
David Hyrum Smith	November 18, 1844	Nauvoo, Illinois	August 29, 1904	Elgin, Illinois	Born approximately five months after the death of Joseph Smith, and was a counselor to his brother, Joseph Smith III, in the First Presidency of the RLDS Church. Married Clara Hartshorn on May 10, 1870 and had one daughter. On January 19, 1877, he was confined to an asylum for the mentally ill in Elgin, Illinois and remained there for the remainder of his life (twenty-seven years).

=== Samuel H. Smith ===
Name	Birth Date	Birth Place	Death Date	Death Place	Notes
Samuel H. Smith	March 13, 1808	Tunbridge, VT	July 30, 1844	Nauvoo, Illinois	As of 2005, has 460 known descendants One of the Eight Witnesses to the Book of Mormon's golden plates. Some church members assumed that Samuel would succeed his brother Joseph as the president of the Latter Day Saint church (see Lineal Succession (Latter Day Saints)). However, Samuel fell ill shortly after their deaths and died just one month later, possibly from internal injuries he suffered while fleeing the mob on horseback on the day his brothers were murdered. The cause of death was attributed to "bilious fever".
Marriage to Mary Bailey on August 13, 1834 in Kirtland, Ohio
Mary Bailey	December 20, 1808	Bedford, New Hampshire	January 25, 1841	Nauvoo, Illinois	
Children
Susannah Bailey Smith	October 27, 1835	Kirtland, Ohio	December 14, 1905	Dell Rapids, South Dakota	
Mary Bailey Smith	March 27, 1837	Mentor, Ohio	October 14, 1916		
Samuel Harrison Bailey Smith	August 1, 1838	Shady Grove, Daviess County, Missouri	June 12, 1914	Salt Lake City, Utah	
Lucy Bailey Smith	January 21, 1841	Nauvoo, Illinois	February 1841	Nauvoo, Illinois	
Marriage to Levira Clark on April 29, 1841 in Nauvoo, Illinois
Levira Clark	July 30, 1815	Levonia, New York	January 1, 1893	Salt Lake City, Utah	
Children
Levira Annette Clark Smith	April 29, 1842	Nauvoo, Illinois	December 18, 1888	St. Louis, Missouri	
Lovisa Annette Clark Smith	August 28, 1843	Nauvoo, Illinois	September 1843	Nauvoo, Illinois	
Lucy Jane Clark Smith	August 20, 1844	Nauvoo, Illinois	August 1844	Nauvoo, Illinois	

=== Ephraim Smith ===
Name	Birth Date	Birth Place	Death Date	Death Place	Notes
Ephraim Smith	March 13, 1810	Royalton, Vermont	March 13, 1810	Royalton, Vermont	

=== William Smith ===
Name	Birth Date	Birth Place	Death Date	Death Place	Notes
William Smith	March 13, 1811	Royalton, Vermont	November 13, 1893	Osterdock, Iowa	Was a Petitioner for Patriarchate of the Reorganized Church of Jesus Christ of Latter Day Saints and the 3rd Presiding Patriarch of the Church of Jesus Christ of Latter-day Saints. As of 2005, had 234 known descendants
Marriage to Caroline A. Grant on February 14, 1833 in Kirtland, Ohio
Caroline A. Grant	January 22, 1814	Windsor, New York	May 22, 1845	Nauvoo, Illinois	
Children
Mary Jane Smith	January 7, 1834	Kirtland, Ohio	December 21, 1878	Brookfield, Missouri	
Caroline L. Smith	August 1836	Kirtland, Ohio	January 9, 1878	Fort Worth, Texas	
Marriage to Roxie R. Grant on May 19, 1847 in Knox, Illinois
Roxie R. Grant	March 16, 1825	Naples, New York	March 30, 1900	Lathrop, Missouri	
Children
Thalia Grant Smith	September 21, 1848	Altonia, Illinois	November 27, 1924	Independence, Missouri	
Hyrum Wallace Smith	August 17, 1850	Altonia, Illinois	January 27, 1935	Lennox, California	
Marriage to Eliza E. Sanborn on November 12, 1857 in Kirtland, Ohio
Eliza E. Sanborn	April 16, 1827	Cattaraugus, New York	March 7, 1889	Elkader, Iowa	
Children
William Enoch Smith	July 23, 1858	Erie, Pennsylvania	February 13, 1930	Mitchell, South Dakota	
Edson Don Carlos Smith	September 16, 1862	Elkader, Iowa	February 13, 1939	Salt Lake City, Utah	
Louise Mae Smith	May 8, 1866	Elkader, Iowa		Mallory Township, Iowa	
Marriage to Rosella Goyette on December 21, 1889 in Clinton, Iowa
Rosella Goyette	May 16, 1830	Montreal, Canada	April 6, 1923	Clinton, Iowa	No children

=== Katharine Smith ===
Name	Birth Date	Birth Place	Death Date	Death Place	Notes
Katharine Smith	July 28, 1813	Lebanon, New Hampshire	February 1, 1900	Fountain Green, Illinois	As of 2005, has 92 known descendants
Marriage to Wilkins J. Salisbury on January 8, 1831 in Kirtland, Ohio
Wilkins Jenkins Salisbury	January 6, 1809	Rushville, New York	November 27, 1853	Plymouth, Illinois	
Children
Elizabeth Salisbury	April 9, 1832	Kirtland, Ohio	July 15, 1832	Kirtland, Ohio	
Lucy Salisbury	October 3, 1834	Kirtland, Ohio	October 18, 1892	Burlington, Iowa	
Soloman Jenkins Salisbury	September 18, 1835	Kirtland, Ohio	January 12, 1927	Burnside, Illinois	
Alvin Salisbury	June 7, 1838	Missouri	August 21, 1880	Fountain Green, Illinois	
Don C. Salisbury	October 25, 1841	Plymouth, Illinois	April 6, 1919	Ferris, Illinois	
Emma C. Salisbury	March 25, 1844	Plymouth, Illinois	October 10, 1846	Alexandria, Missouri	
Lorin Ephriam Salisbury	May 4, 1845	Beardstowne, Illinois	November 18, 1849	Webster, Illinois	
Frederick Vilian Salisbury	January 27, 1850	Webster, Illinois	February 24, 1934	Independence, Missouri	
Marriage to Joseph Younger Aft 1853 in Illinois
Joseph Younger	1805	Lebanon, New Hampshire	1900		No children

=== Don Carlos Smith ===
Name	Birth Date	Birth Place	Death Date	Death Place	Notes
Don Carlos Smith	March 25, 1816	Norwich, Vermont	August 7, 1841	Nauvoo, Illinois	As of 2005, has six known descendants
Marriage to Agnes Moulton Coolbrith on July 30, 1835 in Kirtland, Ohio
Agnes Moulton Coolbrith	July 11, 1811	Scarborough, Maine	December 26, 1876	Los Angeles, California	After Don Carlos died in 1841, Coolbrith married Joseph Smith in 1842, as a Plural Wife.
Children
Agnes Charlotte Smith	August 1, 1836	Kirtland, Ohio,	January 31, 1873		
Sophronia C. Smith	May 24, 1838	New Portage, Illinois	October 3, 1843	Nauvoo, Illinois	
Ina Coolbrith (born: Josephine D. Smith)	March 10, 1841	Nauvoo, Illinois	February 29, 1928	Berkeley, California	An American poet, writer, librarian, and a prominent figure in the San Francisco Bay Area literary community. Ina Coolbrith was the first poet laureate of California.

=== Lucy Smith ===
Name	Birth Date	Birth Place	Death Date	Death Place	Notes
Lucy Smith	July 18, 1821	Palmyra, New York	December 9, 1882	Colchester, Illinois	As of 2005, has 92 known descendants
Marriage to Arthur Milliken on June 4, 1840 in Nauvoo, Illinois
Arthur Millikin	May 9, 1817	Saco, Maine	April 23, 1882	Colchester, Illinois	
Children
Don Carlos Smith Millikin	October 13, 1843	Saco, Maine	November 26, 1932	Hamilton, Illinois	
Sarah M. Millikin	September 13, 1844	Nauvoo, Illinois	November 23, 1934	Portland, Oregon	
George William Dell Millikin	March 4, 1848	Nauvoo, Illinois	January 16, 1913	Colchester, Illinois	
Florence Arabella Millikin	May 23, 1850	Webster, Illinois	October 21, 1927	Colchester, Illinois	
Julia Amelia Millikin	June 17, 1853	Fountain Green, Illinois	June 7, 1888	Salt Lake City, Utah	
Frances A. Millikin	October 26, 1856	Fountain Green, Illinois	March 14, 1858	Colchester, Illinois	
Charles Arthur Millikin	August 31, 1858	Colchester, Illinois	May 12, 1884	Colchester, Illinois	
Clara Irene Millikin	August 23, 1861	Colchester, Illinois	March 26, 1948	Macomb, Illinois	
Clarence Hyrum Millikin	March 26, 1865	Colchester, Illinois	April 5, 1922	Macomb, Illinois	

== See also ==
- Smith family (Latter Day Saints)
