= Lucy Smith Millikin =

Sister of Mormonism founder Joseph Smith (1821–1882)

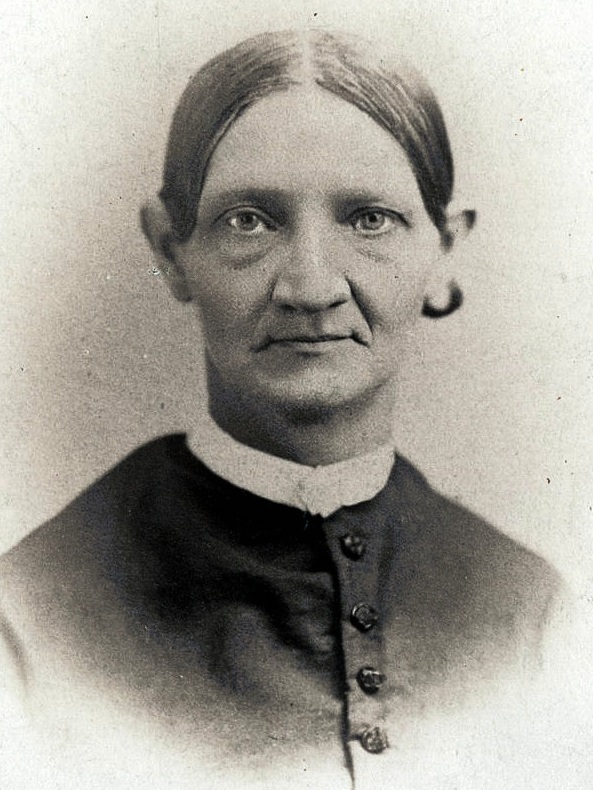
- Born: Lucy Smith; July 18, 1821; Palmyra, New York, US
- Died: December 9, 1882 (aged 61); Colchester, Illinois, US
- Known for: Early participant in the Latter Day Saint movement
- Spouse: Arthur Millikin (m. 1840)
- Children: 9
- Parents: Joseph Smith Sr.; Lucy Mack Smith
- Relatives: Joseph Smith, founder of the Latter Day Saint movement

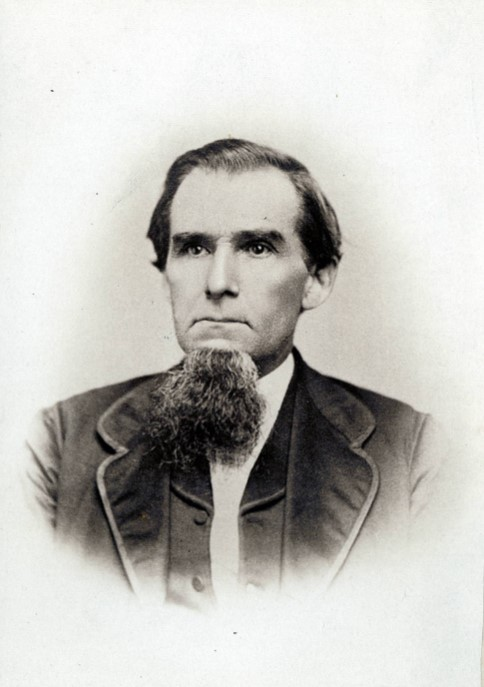
Arthur Millikin, Lucy Smith Millikin's husband (c. 1850–1900)

Lucy Smith Millikin (July 18, 1821 – December 9, 1882) was an American woman who was an early participant in the Latter Day Saint movement and a sister of Joseph Smith. She was the youngest child of Joseph Smith Sr. and Lucy Mack Smith. Millikin joined the Church of Christ when it was organized in 1830, and then moved to Kirtland, Ohio with her family in 1831, where she assisted in the effort to build the Kirtland Temple. After fleeing persecution in Far West, Missouri, she settled in Nauvoo, Illinois. When baptism for the dead was first introduced into the church, Millikin was one of the first Latter Day Saints to participate in the practice. She then joined the Relief Society and served a mission with her husband, Arthur Millikin, in Maine. Millikin chose not to follow Brigham Young and the Mormon pioneers west to Utah Territory, and was instead received into the Reorganized Church of Jesus Christ of Latter day Saints (RLDS) in 1873, though she never became very involved in the church. She died in Colchester, Illinois in 1882, at the age of 61.

== Early life ==
Lucy Smith was born on July 18, 1821, the youngest child of Joseph Smith Sr. and Lucy Mack Smith. She was named after her mother. She had eight older siblings: Alvin, Hyrum, Sophronia, Joseph Jr., Samuel, William, Katharine, and Don Carlos. At the time Smith was born, the family was residing in a small log cabin outside of Palmyra, New York, and her brother Joseph Smith was just beginning the Latter Day Saint movement. Young Lucy Smith's life was "inextricably connected with Restoration events"; for example, as a young child, she gathered with her family to listen to Joseph Jr. preach about God and the Book of Mormon. She is mentioned as the youngest of Joseph's sisters in verse 4 of Joseph Smith–History.

When Lucy Smith was two years old, her brother Alvin died. His death impacted her deeply. Smith's sister Katharine helped take care of her when she was young, and the two remained close throughout their lives. As Lucy Smith grew up, she helped take care of the family farm by "hauling wood, gathering sheep, milking cows, and preparing meals." When she was ten years old, her sister Sophronia had a baby, Maria, and Smith helped care for her new niece. By the age of fourteen, all of her older siblings had married, and she was the only child in the Smith home.

== Involvement in the Latter Day Saint movement ==
Lucy Smith was baptized into the Church of Christ, most likely in 1830 when the church was established. In October of that year, her father, Joseph Smith Sr., was put in jail due to an unpaid debt, leaving Lucy, Katharine, and their mother Lucy Mack Smith alone in the family's Palmyra home. While he was gone, a mob came in search of Hyrum Smith and began to ransack the house until Lucy's brother William forced the men to leave.

In May 1831, nine-year-old Lucy Smith moved with her family to Kirtland, Ohio to join the growing body of Latter Day Saints there. While in Kirtland, she received her patriarchal blessing from her father and sewed clothes for the construction workers tasked with building the Kirtland Temple. Smith also held stock in the Kirtland Safety Society.

In 1838, as tensions mounted among the Latter Day Saints in Kirtland, the Smith family moved to Far West, Missouri. Here, Lucy Smith witnessed her brothers Joseph and Hyrum being captured and taken to jail. After experiencing persecution in Missouri, the Smiths relocated to Illinois in 1839. Harsh weather and lack of food made the journey difficult. Lucy Smith became ill during the trip and lost her shoes while crossing the Mississippi River. The family settled in a cabin in Nauvoo, Illinois on May 10, 1839. Still recovering from her sickness, Smith fainted while "running to tell Hyrum's wife that Joseph and Hyrum were released from prison" and "later suddenly [overcame] her sickness in the excitement of hearing Joseph's voice". Then, when her father, Joseph Smith Sr., grew sick and began to die, she worked as his "primary nurse" until he died. Smith was also one of the first people in the church to participate in baptisms for the dead, serving as proxy for her aunt Lovina Mack, who had died in 1794.

At the age of eighteen, she married Arthur Millikin, who had been wounded in the Battle of Crooked River. Joseph Smith Jr. performed their wedding ceremony on June 4, 1840, in Nauvoo. Lucy and Arthur "actively participated in church and community activities" together after their marriage. Lucy Smith (now Millikin) was "one of the pioneering members of the newly organized Female Relief Society," joining the organization on March 24, 1842. The Millikins then served as missionaries for the church in Arthur's hometown of Saco, Maine in 1843. It was here that Millikin gave birth on October 13, 1843, to their first child, Don Carlos, whom she named after her deceased brother. The Millikin family returned to Nauvoo in May 1844, just one month before the martyrdom of Joseph and Hyrum Smith.

After Joseph's and Hyrum's deaths, the Millikins took in Lucy's mother, Lucy Mack Smith, and cared for her until 1852. They lived together in the Jonathan Browning home in Nauvoo. Millikin focused much of her efforts on caring for her mother, especially once Mack Smith was widowed. Millikin then gave birth to her second child, a daughter named Sarah, on September 13, 1845. During this time, Millikin joined a committee whose task was to encourage "apostates" (those who had left the church) to leave Nauvoo. In September 1846, the Millikin family fled Nauvoo due to conflict that had arisen, and settled in Knoxville, Illinois. However, they soon returned to Nauvoo when Lucy Mack Smith deeded to them a house there. They later sold the property and moved with Mack Smith to Webster, Illinois in 1849.

=== Activity after the succession crisis ===
When the succession crisis in the Latter Day Saint movement occurred, Millikin chose not to follow Brigham Young's group west to Utah Territory; instead, she settled in Fountain Green, Illinois to live near her sisters. After her brother Joseph's death, she continued to believe in his prophetic calling. Millikin did not harbor doctrinal differences with Brigham Young's faction of Latter-day Saints; in fact, she supported the missionary efforts of her LDS nephews, Samuel Smith and Joseph F. Smith, who visited the Millikins on their way to and from Utah. But she did believe that the leadership of the church should stay within the Smith family. Neither Lucy nor Arthur ever accepted Brigham Young as Joseph Smith's successor. Lucy Millikin was "received" into the Reorganized Church of Jesus Christ of Latter day Saints on April 8, 1873, but was involved in the faith only minimally. She maintained her distance from both the LDS and RLDS churches.

== Later years ==
Lucy and Arthur Millikin moved to Colchester, Illinois, forty miles from Nauvoo, in 1856 to avoid persecution and find economic opportunity. Lucy Millikin bought a plot of land in Colchester on January 14, 1857, for thirty-seven dollars. The town had a growing coal industry, and Arthur worked as a miner. The Millikins were "one of the founding families of Colchester". They had a total of nine children: five daughters and four sons. Lucy Millikin died on December 9, 1882, in Colchester after contracting a respiratory disease while caring for a sick daughter-in-law. She was sixty-one years old. She was buried in the Widow Moore Cemetery in Colchester. Her relatives described her as friendly, warm, and "pleasant-mannered" She has also been described as "personally generous." She had 92 known descendants as of February 2005.
