= John Lyman Smith =

American politician

John Lyman Smith (November 17, 1828 – February 21, 1898) was an American politician and Mormon missionary. He served as a member of the House of Representatives for Iron County, Utah, in the Utah territorial legislature from 1852 to 1853, and for Great Salt Lake County, Utah, from 1853 to 1855. Cousin of the founder of the Latter Day Saint Movement, Joseph Smith, Smith was a member of the Church of Jesus Christ of Latter-day Saints (LDS Church), who traveled to the Salt Lake Valley with his family and other Mormon pioneers in 1846. His father, John Smith, served as the fourth Presiding Patriarch for the LDS Church from 1847 to 1854. Additionally, he served two missions as the mission president for the LDS Church in Switzerland and Italy from May 1855 to June 1858 and September 1860 to December 1863, respectively. After his missions, he served in various civic and ecclesiastical positions in Utah.

== Biography ==
John Lyman Smith was born on November 17, 1828, in Potsdam, New York, to Clarissa Lyman and John Smith, brother of Joseph Smith Sr. Joseph Smith Jr., founder of the Latter Day Saint movement, was Smith's cousin. In New York, Smith's family were members of the First Congregational Church. The family converted to the Church of Christ in 1832. In 1833, Smith and his family relocated to Kirtland, Ohio, joining the migration of the Saints. Smith was baptized into the Church of the Latter Day Saints on November 17, 1836, in the Chagrin River. Smith and his family traveled with the Saints from Ohio, to Missouri, to Nauvoo, Illinois, throughout his youth to avoid violence and religious persecution. Despite the frequent moves, Smith attended school and worked jobs that he could find. In 1834, he joined the Nauvoo Legion before the death of his cousin Joseph Smith in 1844.

Smith married Augusta Bowen Cleveland on July 9, 1845, at the age of seventeen in Nauvoo, Illinois. They would later have eight children, of which six survived infancy. In 1847, Smith and his wife traveled with other Mormon pioneers to the Salt Lake Valley with the Daniel Spencer/Perrigrine Sessions Company. Others traveling with Smith included his parents, and his sister Caroline and her family. When Smith was 19 years old, his father was called as the fourth Presiding Patriarch of the LDS Church, serving from 1847 to 1854. In 1851, Smith was asked to help settle Parowan, Utah. Moreover, Smith served as a member of the Utah territorial legislature's House of Representatives for Iron County, Utah, from 1852 to 1853 and for Great Salt Lake County, Utah, from 1853 to 1855.

Smith served two missions for the LDS Church in Switzerland and Italy from May 1855 to June 1858 and September 1860 to December 1863. He served as mission president. He learned to speak German for his missions. In between his two missions, he served as a guard and policeman. Additionally, he studied history, law, German, and photography. During his second mission, besides proselyting, he facilitated the emigration of Saints to America. On the way home from his final mission, he led immigrants across the Atlantic Ocean, and across the plains to Salt Lake City. In 1864, 1869, and 1870, Smith relocated to various cities in Utah including Fillmore, Meadow, and Beaver, at the request of Brigham Young. In between his moves, he engaged in various trades including furniture building and merchandising, farming, and factory laboring. In Fillmore, he served as both county prosecutor and justice of the peace. Additionally, he served as postmaster in Meadow. While in Beaver, he served in civil and ecclesiastical positions. He was a member of the Beaver Literary Institute. For the LDS Church, he served as a high councilman and a patriarch, which required him to travel in Utah and Nevada to give patriarchal blessings. In 1876, after the construction of the St. George Temple, Smith relocated to St. George, Utah, to work in the temple. Smith died in St. George on February 21, 1898, at the age of 69. Smith's digitized missionary journals reside at L. Tom Perry Special Collections at Brigham Young University.

== Family ==
John Lyman Smith married Augusta Bowen Cleveland. Cleveland was born in Cincinnati, Ohio, on December 7, 1828, to John and Sarah Maritta Cleveland. With Cleveland, Smith had eight children. Smith married a plural wife, Mary Adelia Haight, on March 2, 1853. With Haight, Smith had two sons; they were killed in an industrial accident in 1882.
