= Alvin Smith (brother of Joseph Smith) =

Eldest brother of Joseph Smith

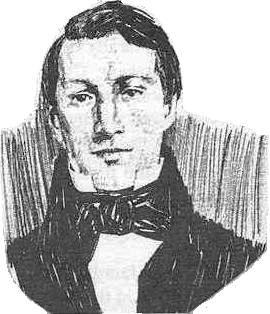

Personal details
- Born: February 11, 1798; Tunbridge, Vermont
- Died: November 19, 1823 (aged 25); Palmyra, New York
- Cause of death: Mercury poisoning from calomel
- Resting place: General John Swift Memorial Cemetery; 43.0650°N 77.2336°W
- Parents: Joseph Smith Sr. Lucy Mack Smith

Alvin Smith (February 11, 1798 – November 19, 1823) was the eldest brother of Joseph Smith, founder of the Latter Day Saint movement. Alvin took a leading role in helping the Smith family work toward paying their debts and building their home. His death at age 25 resulted in his younger brothers Hyrum and Joseph taking more of a leading role in family affairs. Joseph later claimed that he had a vision in which Alvin, who was not baptized while alive, was in the celestial kingdom, which is the highest of the heavenly degrees of glory in mormon theology. His presence in the life of young Joseph Smith and in that vision played a significant role in the establishment of the Latter Day Saint doctrines of redemption of those who die without a knowledge of the gospel, as well as the practice of baptism for the dead in the Church of Jesus Christ of Latter-day Saints (LDS Church).

== Early life ==
Alvin Smith was born in 1798, the first surviving child of Joseph Smith Sr. and Lucy Mack Smith. During his youth, Smith worked as a carpenter's helper to assist the Smith family in saving up sufficient funds to make a down payment on a farm in Manchester Township, south of Palmyra, New York. Smith also assisted his father in clearing timber, planting wheat and tapping maple trees for the purpose of making maple sugar. A neighbor, Orlando Saunders, stated that the members of the Smith family “have all worked for me many a day; they were very good people. Young Joe (as we called him then) has worked for me, and he was a good worker; they all were.” In the early 1820s, Smith was involved with his father and brothers in a number of treasure digging excavations in the Palmyra–Manchester area.

In 1823, Smith took the lead in building the family's new home and worked to get the family out of debt.

== Death ==
On November 19, 1823, at age 25, Smith died of mercury poisoning from calomel, which had been administered to cure a case of "bilious colic". His death occurred two months after Joseph's first visit to the hill from which he was eventually said to have recovered the golden plates that would later be the source for the Book of Mormon. According to a history written by his mother, Lucy Mack Smith, as Smith lay dying he called each member of his family to his bedside to give them counsel. To his brother Hyrum, Smith said, "I have done all I could to make our dear parents comfortable. I want you to go on and finish the house." He urged his brother Joseph to fulfill all of the requirements to obtain the record. Alvin's death had a significant effect on the Smith family, resulting in Joseph taking more of a leadership role.

Alvin's funeral was held at the Presbyterian church. According to an 1893 account by his brother William, "Rev. Stockton had preached my brother's funeral sermon and intimated very strongly that he had gone to hell, for Alvin was not a church member". William cites this as a reason that Joseph Sr. would not join the Presbyterians.

== Significance in the Latter Day Saint doctrine of redemption of the dead ==
Smith figured prominently in the establishment of the Latter Day Saint doctrine of the redemption of the dead and the later establishment of the practice of baptism for the dead. On January 21, 1836, after the completion of the Kirtland Temple, Joseph Smith claimed to have had a vision of the celestial kingdom. Smith stated that he saw his brother Alvin in this vision, and was surprised at his presence since he had died before the establishment of the church and its associated doctrines. Joseph Smith stated that he then received a revelation concerning the salvation of those who die without hearing the gospel and their ability to receive the same opportunities as those who had the opportunity to hear it on earth. Smith later taught that those who died without baptism could be baptized by proxy after their death. This practice continues today in The Church of Jesus Christ of Latter-day Saints, where baptisms for the dead (and other ordinances for the dead) are performed in temples.

== Post-death rumors and events ==
=== Rumors of desecration of Smith's body ===
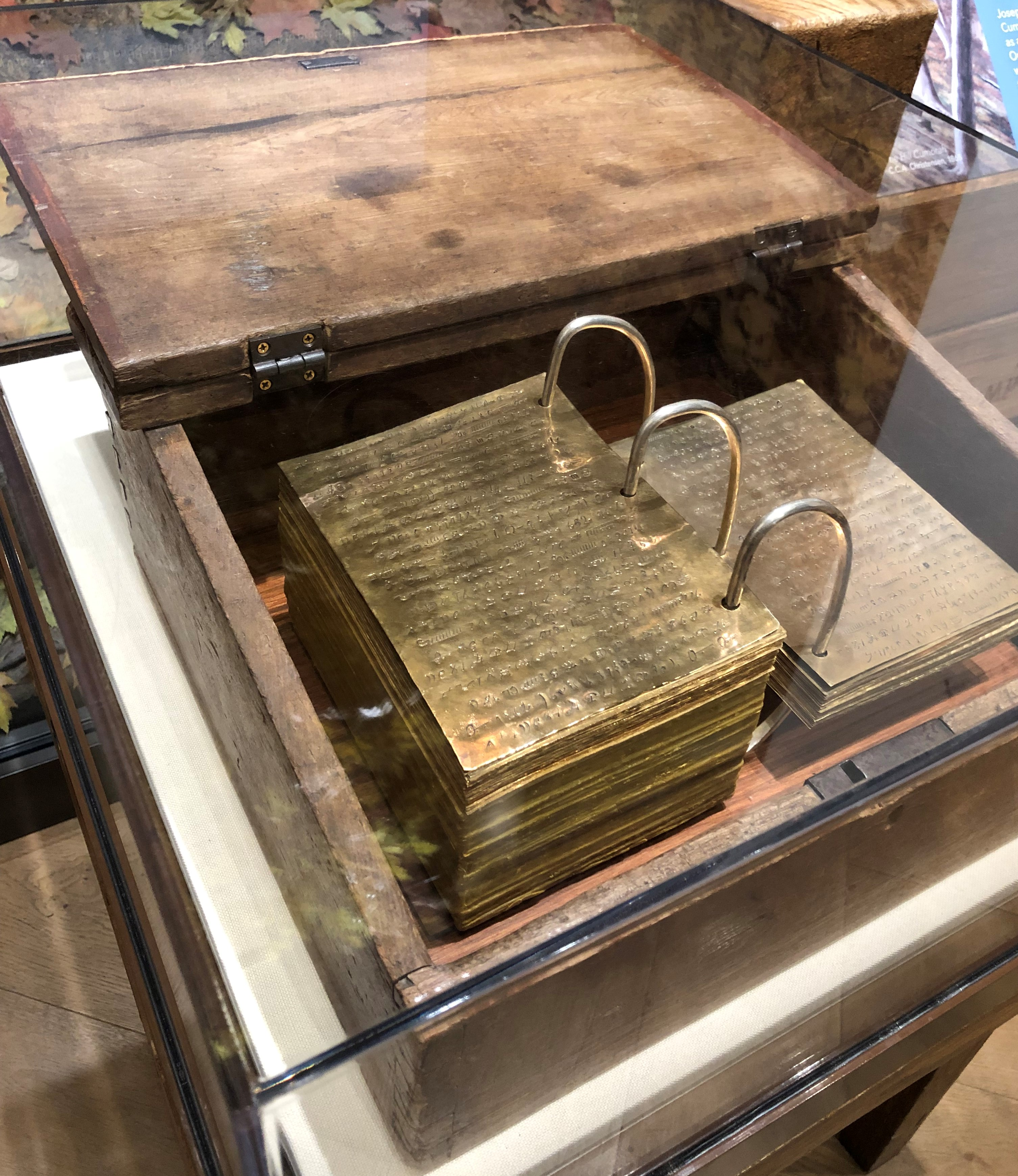
Lap desk owned by Alvin Smith, with a replica of the Golden Plates which were translated as The Book of Mormon.

Biographer Fawn M. Brodie wrote that the Smith family "heard a rumor that Alvin's body had been exhumed and dissected. Fearing it to be true, the elder Smith uncovered the grave on September 25, 1824, and inspected the corpse." Following the exhumation, Joseph Smith Sr. printed the following in the local newspaper on September 29, 1824:

TO THE PUBLIC: Whereas reports have been industriously put in circulation that my son Alvin had been removed from the place of his interment and dissected; which reports ... are peculiarly calculated to harrow up the mind of a parent and deeply wound the feelings of relations ... therefore, for the purpose of ascertaining the truth of such reports, I, with some of my neighbors this morning, repaired to the grave, and removing the earth, found the body, which had not been disturbed. This method is taken for the purpose of satisfying the minds of those who may have heard the report, and of informing those who have put it in circulation, that it is earnestly requested they would desist therefrom.

In Joseph Smith: The Making of a Prophet, historian Dan Vogel notes that “Joseph Sr.’s explanation for disinterring Alvin’s body is questionable because one should have been able to determine if the grave had been disturbed without exhuming the body. It seems probable, therefore, that Joseph Sr. himself may have been the source of the rumor, that the story was a ruse to exhume Alvin’s body for its use in attempting to get the gold plates.”

Historian D. Michael Quinn, in his book Early Mormonism and the Magical World View, suggests that the newspaper notice published by Smith Sr. is evidence that the "guardian," "spirit" or "angel" commanded Joseph to bring a piece of Alvin's body to the hiding place of the golden plates as a requirement for seeing them. Quinn argues that when Smith did not do this, he was unable to see the plates for a second time and had to wait another year. Additionally, Quinn suggests that this information was obscured in official church history because it implies Smith's participation in necromancy. Quinn cites the forged salamander letter as evidence of the requirement to bring Alvin's body to obtain the plates. Quinn believed this letter to be authentic at the time that he wrote Early Mormonism and the Magical World View.

Although the salamander letter was later proven to be a forgery, additional evidence for a requirement to bring Alvin's body in order to obtain the plates has been found in an account of the plates' discovery written by Joseph Knight Sr. (1805-1844):

He [Joseph] exclaimed “why Cant I stur this Book?” And he was answered, “you have not Done rite; you should have took the Book and a gone right away. You cant have it now.” Joseph says, “when can I have it?” The answer was the 22nt Day of September next if you Bring the right person with you. Joseph says, "who is the right Person?” The answer was “your oldest Brother.”

According to Historian Richard Lyman Bushman "Stories circulated of a requirement to bring Alvin to the hill to get the plates; and when he died, someone else.". Speculation surrounding the exhumation of Alvin Smith has spawned a number of publications and films questioning the teachings of the LDS Church. One such film, The God Makers II, suggests that Joseph Smith was required to dig up Alvin's body and bring a part of it with him to the hill Cumorah in order to obtain the gold plates.

=== Subject of the "salamander letter" forgery ===
The story of the exhumation of Smith's remains gained new life with the "discovery" of Mark Hofmann's forged salamander letter. Hofmann admitted that he used Joseph Smith Sr.'s letter and the affidavit of Willard Chase (Mormonism Unvailed, 1834), to create the implication that Joseph needed to take part of Alvin's body to the hill Cumorah. Chase states in his affidavit that the angel told Smith to bring his brother Alvin with him to obtain the plates. By the time of the second visit to the hill, Alvin had been dead for several months. Although Chase's statement makes no further comment regarding Alvin, Hofmann's forgery adds a claim that Smith said to the angel, “he is dead shall I bring what remains but the spirit is gone.” The presence of this statement in the salamander letter reintroduced speculation regarding the exhumation of Alvin's body for the purpose of satisfying the requirements for obtaining the plates. The salamander letter also suggests that Smith's wife Emma or his brother Hyrum were dressed in Alvin's clothes when the plates were delivered to Smith.

== References in popular culture ==
Smith is one of the inspirations for Alvin Miller, the hero of a series of novels and stories by Orson Scott Card.
