= Lucy Mack Smith =

Religious leader and mother of Joseph Smith

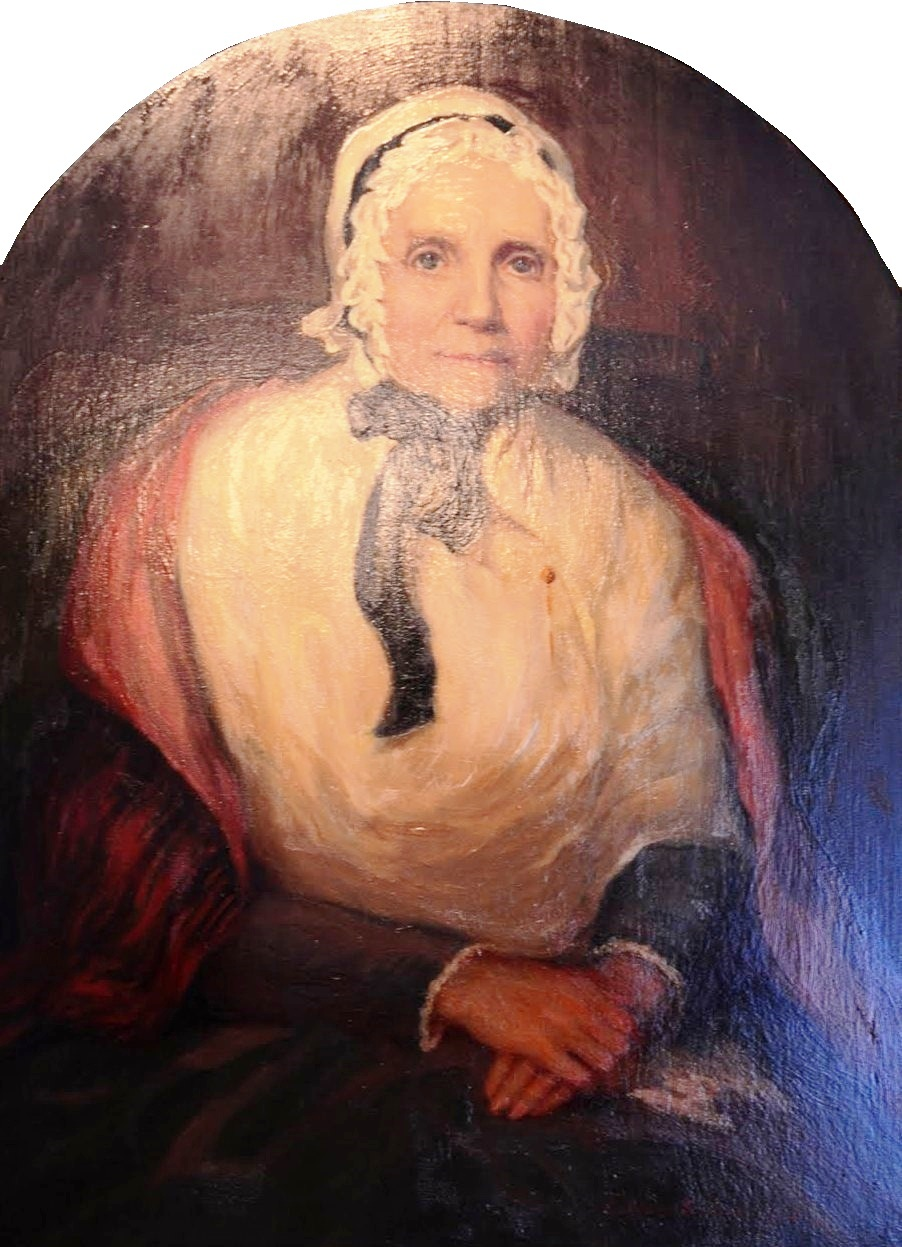
- Painting of Lucy Mack Smith by artist Lee Greene Richards located at the Joseph Smith Birthplace Memorial

Personal details
- Born: Lucy Mack; July 8, 1775; Gilsum, New Hampshire
- Died: May 14, 1856 (aged 80); Nauvoo, Illinois, U.S.
- Resting place: Smith Family Cemetery; 40°32′25.98″N 91°23′31.06″W
- Notable works: History of Joseph Smith by His Mother (originally titled Biographical Sketches of Joseph Smith, the Prophet, and His Progenitors for Many Generations)
- Spouse(s): Joseph Smith, Sr.
- Children: 11, including: Alvin Smith; Hyrum Smith; Joseph Smith, Jr. Samuel H. Smith; William Smith; Katharine Smith; Don Carlos Smith
- Parents: Solomon Mack (Father) and Lydia Matilda Gates

Lucy Mack Smith (July 8, 1775 – May 14, 1856) was the mother of Joseph Smith, founder of the Latter Day Saint movement. She is noted for writing the memoir, Biographical Sketches of Joseph Smith, the Prophet, and His Progenitors for Many Generations and was an important leader of the movement during Joseph's life.

== Background and early life ==
Lucy Mack was born on July 8, 1775, in Gilsum, New Hampshire, during an era of political, economic, and social change with shifting responsibilities within American families. The American Revolutionary War accelerated that shift, which was primarily driven by economics. Growth of the market economy during the early republic period changed the nature of labor outside the home, as well as labor within it. Shifting from primarily agriculture to greater commercialism led paid laborers further from home, which also caused virtually all unpaid domestic labor to take on what had been shared work previously. The domestic burdens of raising children increased greatly.

Following the American Revolution and the disestablishment of State religion it was common to not be affiliated with an organized religion in the late 1700s and 1800s. Solomon Mack was representative of that trend until late in his life when he had a profound religious conversion, which led him to spend his late life evangelizing.

Solomon was self-aware and regretful for his failure to give his children a better example of faith, “I never taught them the fear of the Lord, nor instructed them in the ways of righteousness.” However, he was admiring and complementary about Lucy's moral influence, As he put it, "All the flowery eloquence of the pulpit could not match the influence of his wife on their children."

Lucy's had nine siblings with the oldest three all serving as formative examples of piety. Her brother, Reverend Jason Mack, led his own religious movement. Her two older sisters had folk religious visionary confirmations that their sins had been forgiven and they were called as witnesses of God to others for repentance. Folk magic and religion was common in the era, which made visionary confirmations such as theirs within the norm.

In rural areas of northern New England, the proliferation of evangelical revivals and the pre-Victorian emphasis on the family as a moral force were especially significant forces in Mack's life. Migrants to this area had taken with them the revolutionary spirit of political independence. They had also encouraged the breakdown of the old order of religious domination. "The grip of colonial religious culture was broken and a new American style of religious diversity came into being." Such a setting became fertile ground for religious experimentation and the birth of uniquely American religious sects, some of which "undertook to redefine social and economic order through the model of the extended family." Without stable institutional structures, the family thus became the "crucible" for forming "primary identity, socialization, and cultural norms for rural life."

The same economic forces that reshaped all of American life applied to religion. The First Amendment removed market and cultural protections on established religions, but the desire to engage in religion exploded rather than dissipating. Faith and salvation became entrepreneurial ventures with those attending revivals, buying religious tracts and Bibles, and pledging financially to preachers and their religious movements. Urbanization also made participation in religion valuable for adherents, beyond their devotional aims, by creating signifiers of class and respectability, as well as social/business networks and informal insurance through mutual aid. Later in life Lucy would experience each factor of the intersection of religious and commercial life through the faith one of her sons, Joseph Smith Jr, would found with long-suffering support from Lucy and her husband.

== Marriage and children ==
Lucy Mack married Joseph Smith Sr., in January 1796 with $1,000 wedding gift from her brother, Stephen Mack, and his business partner. Lucy Smith and Joseph Smith Sr shared belief in and practice of folk religion and magic, common in their time, but had very different views on salvation. Smith Sr was a devout Universalist, who founded a Universalist Society with his brother and father, but abstained from institutionalized sects. Lucy became Presbyterian during her marriage, which resulted in her being pressured to ensure her whole family join to avoid being lost to damnation. As a result, Lucy felt heavy personal responsibility for the moral and religious guidance of her children. Her folk and organized religious engagement with her children led her to emerge as a major influence in preparing them for their involvement in the founding of Church of Christ in 1830.

Six years and two children into her marriage to Smith Sr Lucy became ill enough from consumption, the ailment that killed two of her sisters, that she feared she was dying. "I knew not the ways of Christ, besides there appeared to be a dark and lonesome chasm between myself and the Saviour[sic], which I dared not attempt to pass." Lucy spent a night pleading to God to making numerous promises to live an exemplary religious life if she was allowed to live. Eventually she experienced a hopeful supernatural reassurance, "Seek and ye shall find; knock and it shall be opened unto you. Let your heart be comforted; ye believe in God, believe also in me." Lucy sought to live up to the promises she had made throughout her dire illness.

Smith's piety and principles were major moral influence in her children's lives, but she was also concerned about her husband's spiritual well-being. New England ministers declared that a wife's conversion could also help her perform "her great task of bringing men back to God" (Welter, 162). Various publications of the early nineteenth century pointed out:

Religion or piety was the core of women's virtue, the source of her strength. Religion belonged to woman by divine right, a gift of God and nature. This "peculiar susceptibility" to religion was given her for a reason: "the vestal flame of piety, lighted tip by Heaven in the breast of woman" would throw its beams into the naughty world of men (Welter, 152).

According to Nancy Woloch, "Female converts outnumbered male converts three to two in the Second Great Awakening in New England. ... By 1814, for instance, women outnumbered men in the churches and religious societies in rural Utica, and they could be relied upon to urge the conversion of family members" (121).

Smith took the initiative in trying to involve her family in seeking the "true church." In light of Joseph Sr.'s indifference, she sought consolation in prayer that the gospel would be brought to her husband and was reassured by a dream that her husband would be given "the pure and undefiled Gospel of the Son of God" (56). About this time, Joseph Sr. began having dreams with symbolic content that were interpreted as being related to his ambivalence about religious faith. These dreams continued after the family's move to Palmyra, New York, until he had had seven in all; Lucy remembered five well enough to quote in detail.

== Book of Mormon ==
Smith's efforts to find the true religion continued in Palmyra. She went from sect to sect; sometime after 1824, she and three of her children—Hyrum, Samuel, and Sophronia—joined Western Presbyterian Church, the only church with a meetinghouse in Palmyra. Although Smith longed for her family to be united in their religious faith, she could not persuade her husband nor her son Joseph to join them.

In 1827, when Joseph obtained the golden plates which told of the history of the early inhabitants of the American continent, Smith stopped going to Presbyterian meetings. She said, "We were now confirmed in the opinion that God was about to bring to light something upon which we could stay our minds, or that he would give us a more perfect knowledge of the plan of salvation and the redemption of the human family. This caused us greatly to rejoice, the sweetest union and happiness pervaded our house, and tranquility reigned in our midst" (Smith, chap. 19). Much of Smith's attention during this period was directed towards the hope that her family would be the instrument in bringing salvation to the whole human family. When Joseph went on to establish what he taught was the restoration of the original Christian church, it was the means of making his mother's dream of a family united in religious harmony come true. Joseph's project of "restoration" was thought of by his mother as a Smith family enterprise: as Jan Shipps has pointed out, Lucy Smith employs the pronouns "we", "ours", and "us" rather than simply referring to Joseph's particular role (Mormonism, 107).

== Church leadership ==
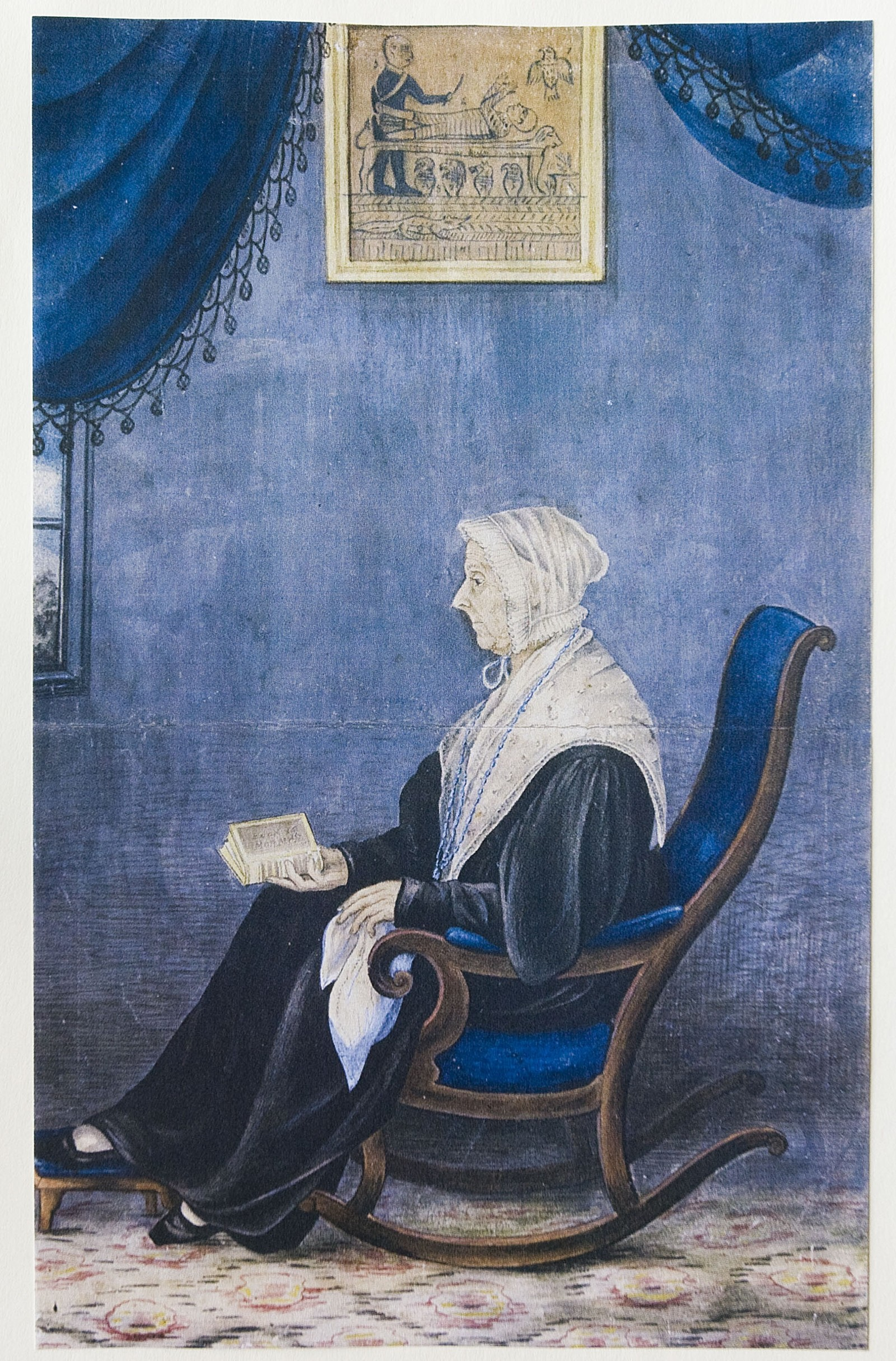
Portrait of Smith in Nauvoo. In her right hand is a Book of Mormon, and a vignette from the Book of Abraham is on the wall.

Smith took on the role as a mother figure to converts who were baptized into the Church of Christ. In Kirtland, Ohio, Smith shared her home with newly arrived immigrants, sometimes sleeping on the floor herself when the house was full. She participated in missionary work and at one time stood up to a Presbyterian minister in defense of her faith.

When Joseph made his father the church's first patriarch in December 1833, he emphasized the familial nature of the early Mormon movement. Likening his father to Adam, Joseph said, "So shall it be with my father; he shall be called a prince over his posterity, holding the keys of the patriarchal priesthood over the kingdom of God on earth, even the Church of the Latter Day Saints" (qtd. in Bates and Smith, 34). In this calling, "Father Smith" was to give patriarchal blessings to the Latter Day Saints; when he attended the blessing meetings, he insisted that his wife accompany him (chap. 44). On at least one occasion, Lucy Smith added her blessing or confirmed what had already been received (Crosby).

During the Missouri period when Joseph Jr. and Hyrum were imprisoned in Liberty Jail, Lucy Smith was a leader in her family and church. In Nauvoo, Illinois, Smith became isolated in caring for her dying husband and her role in the church therefore diminished. Her husband's dying blessing on her was to reaffirm her role and status: "Mother, do you not know that you are the mother of as great a family as ever lived upon the earth. ... They are raised up to do the Lord's work" (chap. 52).

== Family deaths ==
Smith's eldest child, Alvin, died November 19, 1823. Her next two sons Joseph and Hyrum were killed on June 27, 1844, in Carthage, Illinois. When Smith saw the bodies of her martyred sons, she cried "My God, my God, why hast thou forsaken this family?" (chap. 54). About one month later, her son Samuel died after a month of illness brought on by exposure and other events incident to the murders of Joseph and Hyrum. Of this time, Smith recalls, "I was left desolate in my distress. I had reared six sons to manhood, and of them all, one only remained, and he too far distant to speak one consoling word to me in this trying hour" (chap. 54). William, the surviving son, was on a mission in New York when his brothers died.

== Succession crisis ==
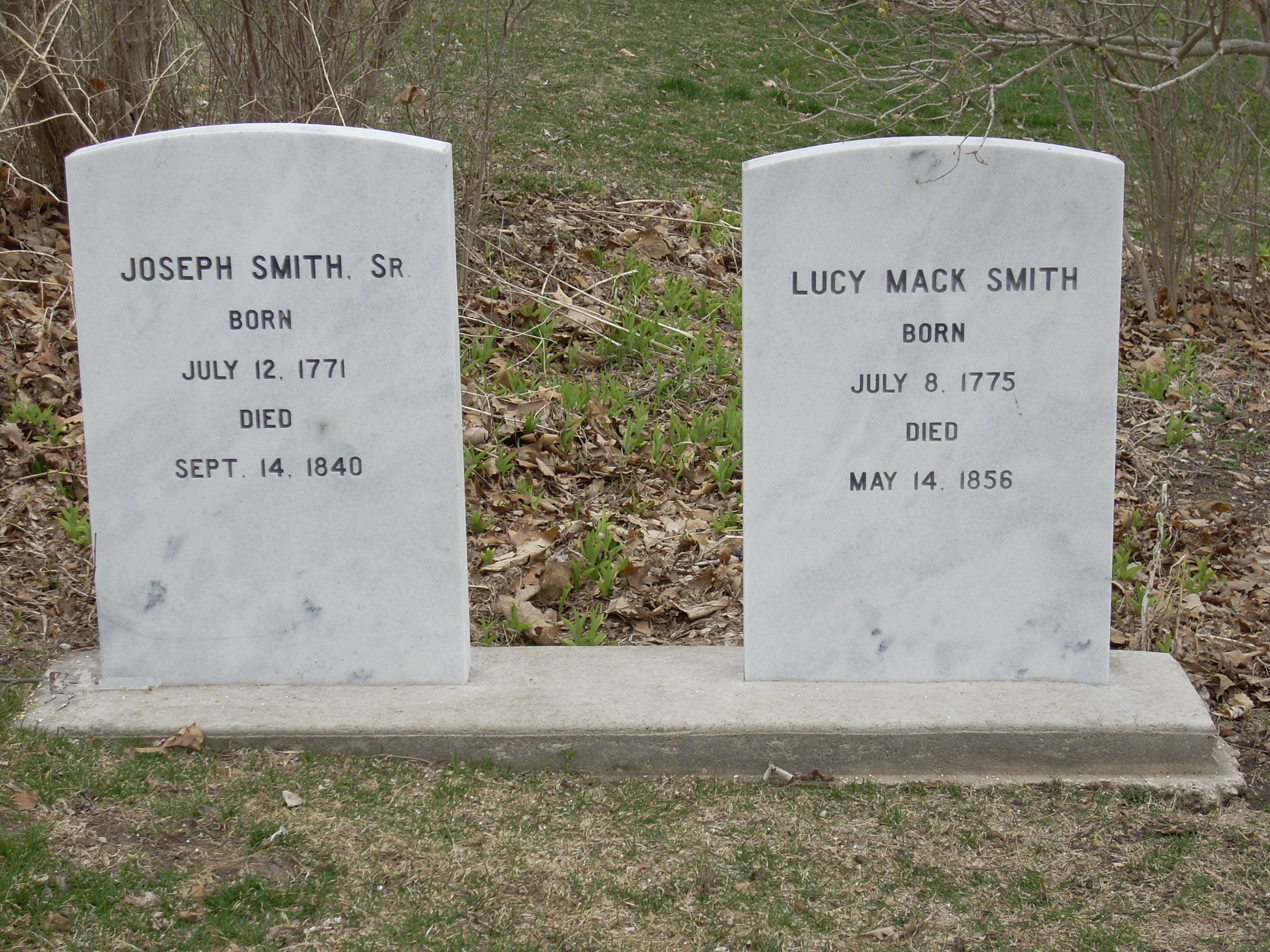
Grave of Joseph Sr. and Lucy Mack Smith in Nauvoo, Illinois

After the death of Joseph and Hyrum, a crisis of leadership gripped the church. Hyrum had been Joseph's chosen successor, and it was unclear who should lead when both were killed. While Smith initially supported the leadership claims of James Strang, ultimately a majority of Latter Day Saints sided with the leadership of Brigham Young and the other members of the Quorum of the Twelve.

James Strang published a statement allegedly signed by Smith, her son William, and her three daughters, certifying that "the Smith family do believe in the appointment of J. J. Strang" as Joseph's successor. However, Smith later addressed church members at the October 1844 general conference and stated that she hoped all her children would accompany the Latter Day Saints to the west, and if they did, she too would go. Young said: "We have extended the helping hand to Mother Smith. She has the best carriage in the city, and, while she lives, shall ride in it when and where she pleases" (Millennial Star, vol. 7, p. 23).

At this time, Smith became a symbol of continuity, assuming greater importance at that time because of the strained relationship between Young and one of Joseph's widows, Emma. Hosea Stout noted in his diary on February 23, 1845, that Smith spoke at a church meeting. She spoke "with the most feeling and heartbroken manner" of "the trials and troubles she had passed through in establishing the Church of Christ and the persecutions and afflictions which her sons & husband had passed through" (1:23). Smith also asked permission to speak at the October 1845 general conference in Nauvoo. After she had recited the sufferings of her family on behalf of the church, she asked if they considered her a mother in Israel. Young formally conferred this title on Smith by saying: "All who consider Mother Smith as a mother in Israel, signify by saying 'yes.' One universal 'yes' rang throughout" (History of the Church 7:470-71).

Smith did not comment about the difficulties she encountered with church leaders during the transitional period—troubles which, without doubt, were exacerbated by her son William's refusal to be subservient to Young—but they are suggested in the few letters and second-hand accounts that have survived (Quaife, 246–48). Whether Smith again shifted her support from Young to Strang in the year following the October 1845 conference is a matter of debate. What is certain is that she never attempted the journey to Utah Territory: she remained in Nauvoo with her daughters, her daughter-in-law, Emma, and Emma and Joseph's sons (Joseph III, David Hyrum, Alexander Hale, and Frederick G. W.) until her death in May 1856.

== Ancestry and descendants ==
Smith was a third cousin of Oliver Cowdery, who was a golden plates witness, a Book of Mormon scribe, and the original Second Elder and Assistant President of the Church.

John Fuller (1656-1726)
Shubael Fuller (1697-1769)	siblings	John Fuller Jr (1697-1758)
Lydia Fuller (1709-1778)	cousins	William Fuller (1729)
Lydia Gates (1732-1817)	2nd cousins	Rebecca Fuller (1768)
Lucy Mack Smith	3rd cousins	Oliver Cowdery

== See also ==
- Joseph Smith Papyri
