= Don Carlos Smith =

American Mormon leader (1816–1841)

- Born: March 25, 1816; Norwich, Vermont
- Died: August 7, 1841 (aged 25); Nauvoo, Illinois
- Known for: Early leader in the Church of Jesus Christ of Latter Day Saints
- Spouse: Agnes Moulton Coolbrith
- Children: 3, including Ina Coolbrith
- Parents: Joseph Smith Sr. (father); Lucy Mack Smith (mother)

Don Carlos Smith (March 25, 1816 – August 7, 1841) was the youngest brother of Joseph Smith and a leader, missionary, and periodical editor in the early days of the Latter Day Saint movement.

== Life and career ==
=== Early life ===
Smith was born in Norwich, Vermont, on March 25, 1816, the seventh son of Joseph Smith Sr. and Lucy Mack Smith. As an adolescent, Smith was an early convert to the Church of Christ that was established by his brother Joseph in 1830. Don Carlos was baptized on June 9 of that year in Seneca Lake. He was also active as an early missionary of the Latter Day Saint church. At the age of fourteen, Smith was the youngest missionary for the church, serving with his father, Joseph Smith Sr., in the Eastern States mission from August through September 1830.

=== Personal life and missions ===
He married Agnes Moulton Coolbrith on July 30, 1835, with whom he had three daughters. The following year, he served again in the Eastern States mission. Smith served his last mission at age 22 in the Southern States mission, from September 26, 1838, until December 25, 1838. Smith participated in the ceremony of the laying of the cornerstones of the Kirtland Temple, and he was a member of the temple's construction crew.

=== Career ===
Smith was the first editor of the Nauvoo, Illinois-based Latter Day Saint newspaper Times and Seasons, beginning in June 1839 after he and his colleague, Ebenezer Robinson, were commissioned by a council of leaders of the Church of Jesus Christ of Latter Day Saints to publish. He edited a total of 31 editions of the Times and Seasons from 1839 to 1841. As a printer and editor, Smith was involved in the printing of the 1835 edition of the Doctrine and Covenants, several editions of the Book of Mormon, and also served as the publisher and editor for the short-lived periodical Elders' Journal. Smith also participated in printing the monthly editions of the Messenger and Advocate newspaper.

On January 15, 1836, Smith was selected as the first president of the high priests quorum of the church, a position that is today referred to as a stake president. He represented the high priests of the church when the cornerstones were laid to the Nauvoo Temple in early 1841. Smith also served on the Nauvoo City Council. He was brigadier general of the Nauvoo Legion and a regent at the University of Nauvoo.

=== Death ===
Smith died in Nauvoo, Illinois, on August 7, 1841, of pneumonia. He was buried at the Smith Family Cemetery. He was survived by his wife Agnes Moulton Coolbrith, who later became a plural wife of Joseph Smith. Don Carlos Smith was the father of Ina Coolbrith, who became the first poet laureate of California.

== See also ==
- Robert B. Thompson
