= Katharine Smith Salisbury =

Sister of Joseph Smith (1813–1900)

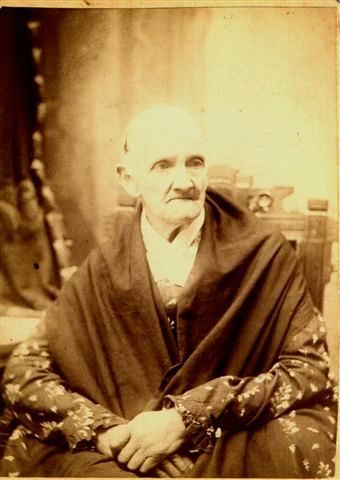
- Born: Katharine Smith; July 8, 1813; Lebanon, New Hampshire
- Died: February 1, 1900 (aged 86); Fountain Green, Illinois
- Burial place: Webster, Illinois

Katharine Smith Salisbury (July 8, 1813 – February 1, 1900) was a sister to Joseph Smith and an early convert in the Latter Day Saint movement.

== Early life ==
Katharine Smith was born in Lebanon, New Hampshire, as the seventh surviving child of Joseph Smith Sr. and Lucy Mack. Later in her life, she recollected that when her brother Joseph brought the golden plates to the family home in Manchester, New York, in September 1827, he "entered the house running", with the plates "clasped to his side with his left hand and arm, … his right hand … badly bruised from knocking down at least three men who had leaped at him from behind bushes or fences as he ran." Several times she was permitted to lift the plates, which were always covered with a cloth when she did so. She also provided a detailed recollection of the visits of the Angel Moroni to her brother.

== Latter Day Saint convert ==
Katharine attended the first meetings of the Church of Christ in 1830, and was baptized as a member in June 1830 by David Whitmer. In 1831, she moved with the Smith family to Kirtland, Ohio, to join the main gathering of Latter Day Saints. On June 8, 1831, she married Wilkins Jenkins Salisbury, a fellow convert to Mormonism, in Kirtland. He was one of the first seventies of the church, but he was excommunicated by the Kirtland high council in 1836 for "talebearing and drinking strong liquor". The Salisburys settled in Chardon, Ohio, and later followed the Latter Day Saint movements to Missouri and Illinois. In Illinois, they settled in Plymouth, which was forty miles from church headquarters in Nauvoo.

== Life in Illinois ==
After Katharine's brothers Joseph and Hyrum were killed, the Salisburys moved to Nauvoo to be with the other members of the Smith family. Like the other members of the Smith family, they did not endorse the leadership of Brigham Young and refused to follow him to the Salt Lake Valley; this was based largely on her strong belief that the church should be led by a member of the Smith family.

Later, the Salisburys settled in Fountain Green, Illinois, where Katharine would live for the rest of her life. In 1853, Wilkins Jenkins Salisbury died of typhoid fever; they were the parents of eight children. On May 3, 1857, she married Joseph Younger; they eventually divorced, though it is not known when this took place. They had no children together. After the divorce, Katharine retained the surname Salisbury for the rest of her life.

== RLDS Church member ==
In 1873, based on her 1830 baptism, Salisbury was received as a member of the Reorganized Church of Jesus Christ of Latter Day Saints (RLDS Church), which was headed by her nephew Joseph Smith III. She was an active member for the remainder of her life, often traveling to RLDS Church conferences in Lamoni, Iowa, and Independence, Missouri. RLDS Church leaders often invited her to sit on the platform at church meetings because she was regarded as a living link to the early days of the church.

Salisbury was the longest-lived sibling of Joseph Smith; she was frequently sought out for interviews and recollections by RLDS Church members and members of The Church of Jesus Christ of Latter-day Saints. She died in Fountain Green, Illinois, and she is buried in Webster, Illinois. As of 2005, she had 92 known descendants.
