= Joseph Smith Sr. =

First Presiding Patriarch, one of Eight Witnesses of the Book of Mormon (1771–1840)

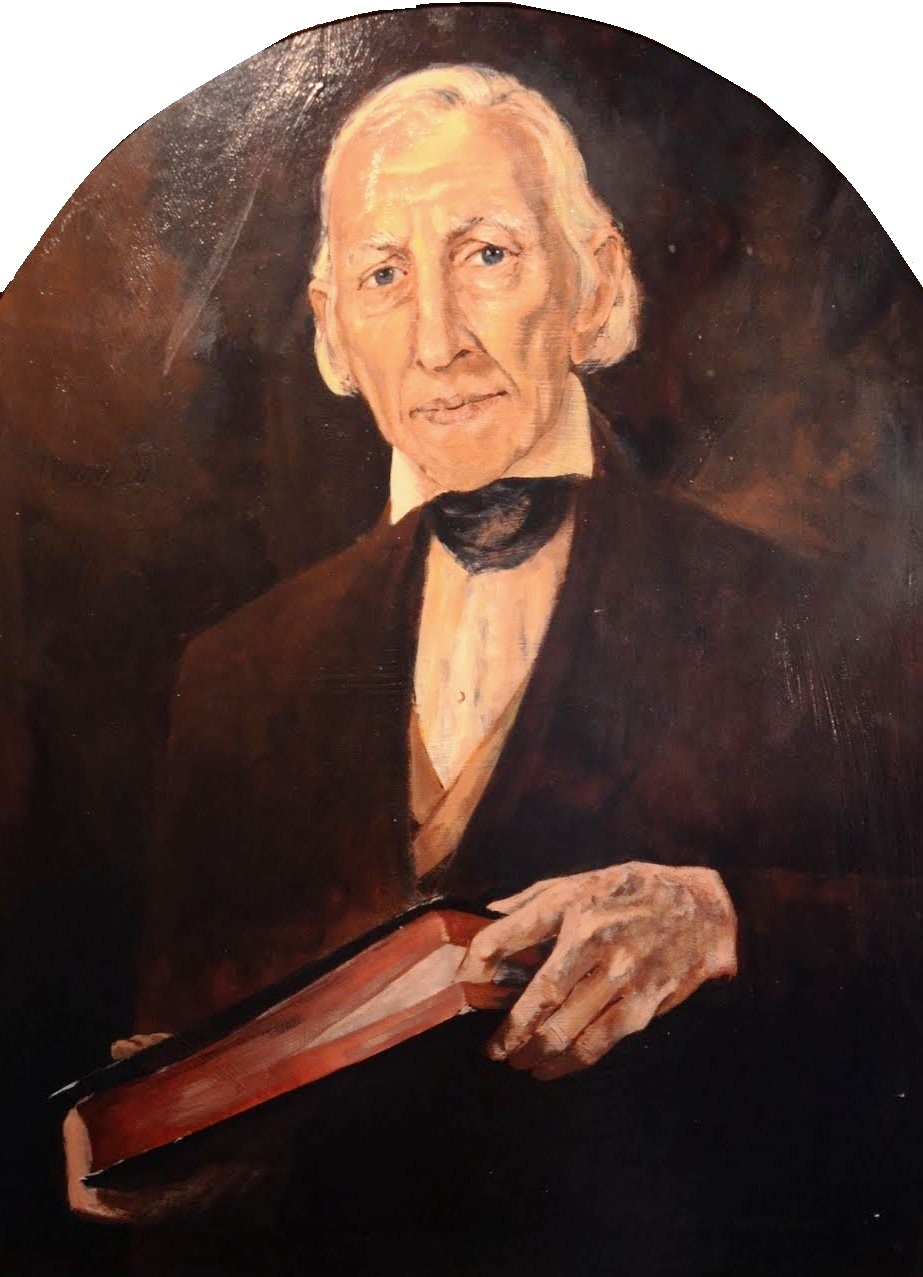

1st Presiding Patriarch
- December 18, 1833 – September 14, 1840
- Called by: Joseph Smith Jr.
- Successor: Hyrum Smith

Assistant Counselor in the First Presidency
- September 3, 1837 – September 14, 1840
- Called by: Joseph Smith Jr.

Personal details
- Born: July 12, 1771; Topsfield, Province of Massachusetts Bay
- Died: September 14, 1840 (aged 69); Nauvoo, Illinois, United States
- Resting place: Smith Family Cemetery; 40°32′25.98″N 91°23′31.06″W
- Spouse(s): Lucy Mack
- Children: 11, including: Alvin Smith; Hyrum Smith; Joseph Smith Jr. Samuel H. Smith; William Smith; Katharine Smith; Don Carlos Smith
- Parents: Asael Smith

Joseph Smith Sr. (July 12, 1771 – September 14, 1840) was the father of Joseph Smith Jr., founder of the Latter Day Saint movement. Joseph Smith Sr. was also one of the Eight Witnesses, the second of two groups of witnesses that stated that they had seen and handled the golden plates, which his son, Joseph, said was his source material for the Book of Mormon. Smith was an original member of his son's church, the Church of Christ, in 1830 when it was founded. In 1833, Smith became the church's first patriarch, and in 1837 became a member of the First Presidency of the church until his death in 1840.

== Life before the Latter Day Saint movement ==
Smith was born on July 12, 1771, in Topsfield, Massachusetts, to Asael Smith and Mary Duty. He married Lucy Mack in Tunbridge, Vermont, on January 26, 1796, and had 11 children with her. Details of Smith's paternal line go back to his 3rd great-grandfather Robert Smith from Lincolnshire, England who settled in Massachusetts colony during the Puritan migration. Some previous DNA testing on Smith's descendants had revealed some Irish roots.

Smith was a Universalist in his early years and founded a Universalist society in Topsfield, Massachusetts, in 1797 with his brother Jesse and father Asael. While the society was short-lived, Smith maintained a philosophical, though not an institutional, tie to Universalism. Like most 19th-century Americans, Smith was unaffiliated with any organized religion for much of his life.

Smith practiced his Universalist beliefs through folk religion and magical beliefs, which included dream Interpretation and visionary experience, use of "divining rods" and "seer stones", as well as using magic to identify and dig for buried treasure. Smith modeled each folk religion and magic tradition for all of his children. Most notably his son Joseph relied on all three categories of folk magic gifts as he shared his religious story of obtaining and translating the Book of Mormon.

Smith, like his wife Lucy, struggled with depression. Lucy described her husbands depression as "deep periods of melancholy," which she said he "medicated" with alcohol. Other contemporaries of Smith characterized his self-medication, more severely and chronically, as persistent alcohol abuse. Folk magic also offered Smith less self-destructive and destabilizing comforts. In dreams he taught his family were visionary Smith saw resolution to the troubles that regularly overwhelmed him and Lucy in life. Smith believed one such dream foreshadowed his own salvation.

Smith tried his hands at several occupations, including farmer, teacher, and shop-keeper, none of which proved very successful. He moved his family to Palmyra, New York, in 1816 and began to make payments on a farm located on the edge of neighboring Manchester Township. Work on a frame house at the farm was halted by the unexpected death of Smith's eldest son, Alvin, in 1823.

Smith subsequently failed to make payments on the farm. Lemuel Durfee purchased it as a favor to the family and allowed the Smiths to continue there as renters until 1830. In Palmyra–Manchester Smith and his sons, including Joseph Smith Jr., employed their folk magic practices in a number of treasure digging excavations during the 1820s.

Smith's wife, Lucy, became involved with Presbyterianism. Joining the Presbyterian church did not dissuade Lucy away from folk religion and magic beliefs she shared with her husband. However, the differing religious affiliations Smith and Lucy held did cause her personal dissonance. In her own visionary dreaming experience, she said felt she received a divine witness that her husband would some day accept "the pure and undefiled Gospel of the Son of God." When the older Smith was baptized into the Church of Christ, his son Joseph seemed to feel it was the culmination of Lucy's vision. In the interim, Smith continued to have his own visionary dreams with highly symbolic content.

== Participation in the Latter Day Saint movement ==
Smith was baptized when the Church of Christ was formally organized on April 6, 1830. When the younger Joseph saw the older Smith come up out of the water, he is reported to have cried, "Oh! My God I have lived to see my own father baptized into the true church of Jesus Christ!"

In January 1831, Smith and his family moved to the church's new headquarters in Kirtland, Ohio. He was ordained to be the church's first Presiding Patriarch on December 18, 1833. In reference to his father's role as patriarch of the church, Joseph likened his father to Adam, the first biblical patriarch: "So shall it be with my father; he shall be called a prince over his posterity, holding the keys of the patriarchal priesthood over the kingdom of God on earth, even the Church of the Latter Day Saints".

As part of his new role, Smith presided in council meetings and administered patriarchal blessings. On September 3, 1837, Smith was also made an Assistant Counselor to his son in the First Presidency of the church. Smith was present at the first performance of the Second Anointing ritual, the highest ordinance in the Latter Day Saint movement, which guarantees salvation and confers godhood.

Joseph hosted the first recorded version of this ritual in January 1833. During the meeting, Joseph washed the feet of all 12 men present. He paused to ask his father for a priesthood blessing before washing Smith's feet, in which Smith "[pronounced] upon [Joseph's] head that he should continue in his Priests office until Christ come."

== Book of Mormon ==
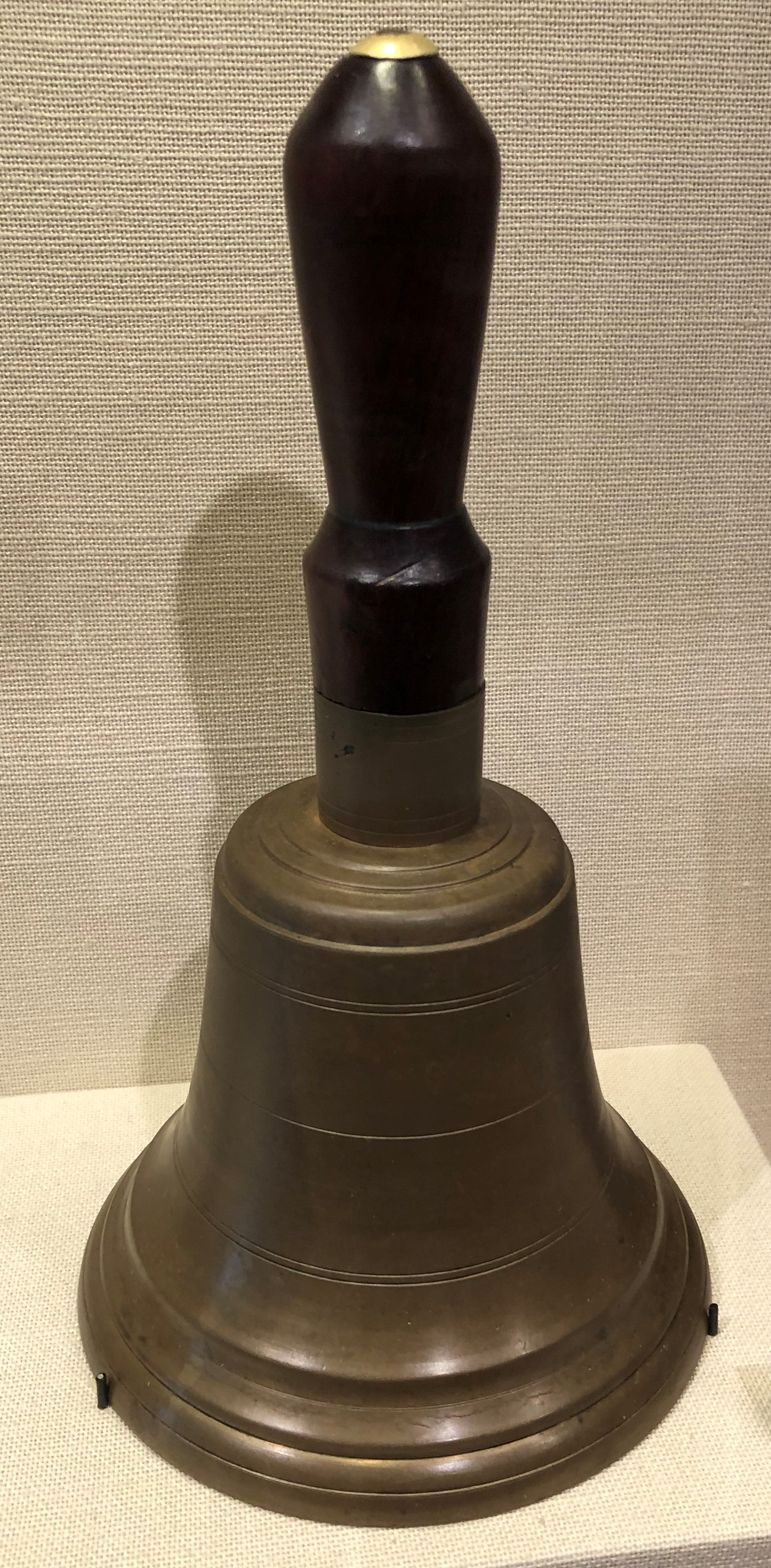
Bell used by Smith when he was a school teacher. Located at the Church History Museum

In the late 1820s, Smith's son, Joseph began to tell the family about golden plates, which he said contained a record of the ancient inhabitants of the Americas. In September 1827, Joseph said he had obtained from an angel the plates and began translating them into English over the following years through the use of a seer stone, which he found previously during a treasure digging expedition. Joseph also said he translated using an Urim and Thummim, a device given to him by the same angel who gave him the plates.

At the end of June 1829, as Joseph's dictation of what would become the Book of Mormon neared its completion, the older Smith and seven other men signed a joint statement, testifying that they had both lifted the plates and seen the engravings on the plates. Known as the "Testimony of the Eight Witnesses", the statement and another statement from the Three Witnesses were published with the first edition of the Book of Mormon and have been a part of nearly all subsequent editions.

== Deathbed blessings ==
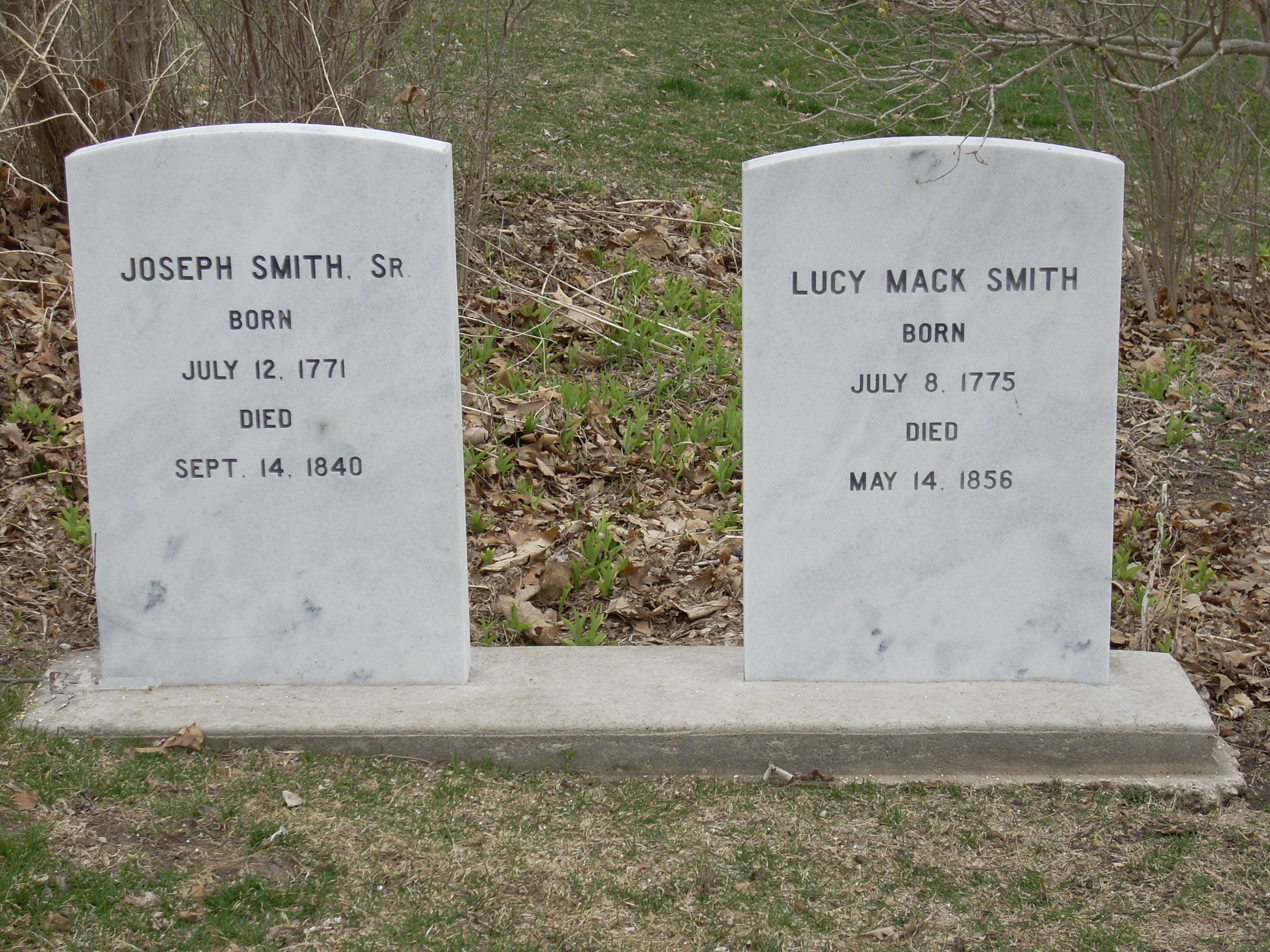
Grave of Joseph Sr. and Lucy Mack Smith

Smith moved with his family to Far West, Missouri, in 1838 and from there to the church's new headquarters at Nauvoo, Illinois, in 1839. Old age and illnesses had taken their toll and by the end of summer 1840, Smith realized he was dying. He called his family around him to administer patriarchal blessings.

He blessed his wife: "Mother, do you not know that you are the mother of as great a family as ever lived upon the earth. ...they are raised up to do the Lord's work". He blessed and ordained his eldest surviving son, Hyrum to succeed to the office of Presiding Patriarch by right of lineage.

Smith died in Nauvoo on September 14, 1840.

== Notes ==
Church of Christ titles
Also known as Church of the Latter Day Saints and Church of Jesus Christ of Latter Day Saints
First	Presiding Patriarch; December 18, 1833 - September 14, 1840	Succeeded by Hyrum Smith
First	Assistant Counselor in the First Presidency; September 3, 1837 – September 14, 1840; Served alongside: Oliver Cowdery, Hyrum Smith, and John Smith	Succeeded by John Smith
