= Samuel T. Lawrence =

Samuel Tyler Lawrence (November 21, 1786 – December 18, 1847) was resident of New York in the 1820s who was an early associate of Joseph Smith, the founder of the Latter-day Saint movement. Lawrence moved from New Jersey to Palmyra, New York, with sister Fanny and her husband Abner Cole. Lawrence and Smith reportedly engaged in "money-digging" (or treasure hunting).

Later Lawrence moved to Oswego, New York, where he died.

== Early life ==
Lawrence was born in New Jersey to Sylvanus and Jemima Lawrence. He had an older brother, Daniel, and an adopted sister, Frances "Fanny" Wickham Darling, a biological first cousin who was adopted into the family and took the last name Lawrence.

By 1811, Lawrence and Rachel Bryant (born 1793) were married, and the two had at least one daughter, Frances Maria.

== In Palmyra ==
Palmyra (New York)

Around 1820, Lawrence and his family moved to Palmyra. Samuel's sister Fanny and her husband Abner Cole had resided in Palmyra since 1812.

In Palmyra, Lawrence developed a reputation as a seer and a treasure-hunter. Lawrence was part of a company of "money-diggers" that included Joseph Smith, Sr., Joseph Smith, Jr., Hyrum Smith, George Proper, Josiah Stowell, and Alva Beaman.

Martin Harris, a witness to the Book of Mormon's golden plates, later recalled a tale of an encounter between the money-diggers and a "treasure guardian":

"Samuel Lawrence told me that while they were digging, a large man who appeared to be eight or nine feet high, came and sat on the ridge of the barn, and motioned to them that they must leave. They motioned back that they would not; but that they afterwards became frightened and did leave."

Another resident, Joseph Capron, recalled when the company "discovered" a chest of gold watches, but they were "in the possession of the evil spirit". Lawrence, reportedly "with a drawn sword in his hand, marched around to guard any assault which his Satanic majesty might be disposed to make." The dig ended without success.

According to one account, Lawrence traveled with Smith to Harmony, Pennsylvania, to search for a silver mine, during which Lawrence recommended Smith to Emma Hale, Smith's future wife.

== Lawrence and the golden plates ==
Joseph Smith, founder of the Latter Day Saint movement, claimed the Book of Mormon was a translation of golden plates which Smith had been guided to by an angel. Lawrence figures in some of the discovery narratives of the golden plates.

Willard Chase recalled in 1833 that Smith had been told by a spirit "to come again, in just one year, and bring a man with him". According to Chase, Smith at one point "believed that one Samuel T. Lawrence was the man alluded to by the spirit" and reportedly took Lawrence "to a singular looking hill, in Manchester, and showed him where the treasure was." According to the account, Smith later changed his mind and decided Lawrence was not the "right man".

Joseph Knight, Sr. recalled that "Joseph was some afraid of Samuel Lawrence that he might be a trouble to him." Therefore, prior to retrieving the golden plates on September 22, 1827, Smith sent his father to Lawrence's residence "to see if there was any signs of his going away that night."

In her 1853 book, Lucy Mack Smith recalled her husband's visit to the Lawrence house, writing that "he could overhear their conversation" and they were "devising many plans and schemes to find 'Joe Smith's gold bible'." Reportedly, Lawrence's wife warned her husband "'Sam, Sam,' said she. 'You are cutting your own throat.' At this, the conjuror bawled out at the top of his voice, 'I am not afraid of anybody. We will have the plates in spite of Joe Smith or all the devils in hell.'"

== Later life ==
In May 1830, Lawrence was operating the Palmyra Bathing House, and served as a subscription collector for his brother-in-law's paper the Liberal Advocate.

On April 17, 1833, Lawrence was indicted for "fraudulently secreting property". Lawrence and his brother Daniel moved with their families to Oswego, New York by the autumn of 1833. He died at Oswego.
