= Willard Chase =

American treasure hunter

- Born: February 1, 1798
- Died: March 10, 1871 (aged 73)

Willard Chase (February 1, 1798 – March 10, 1871) was an American resident of 19th-century New York and an early associate of Joseph Smith, the founder of the Latter Day Saint movement. He is known for his disputes with Joseph Smith regarding the ownership and existence of Joseph Smith's seer stone and of the golden plates.

== Biography ==
Chase was born to parents Clark Chase (b. August 22, 1770) and Phebe Mason. Chase had two older siblings, Durfee and Mason, and seven younger siblings: Sarah "Sally", Edmund, Purley, Lucinda, Henry, Abel D., and Asa S.

Chase married Malissa Sanders Sounders. The couple had two children: Luther M. and Clark S.

Chase was a carpenter and lay Methodist minister.

Chase died in Palmyra, New York, on March 10, 1871.

== Role in Early Mormonism ==
Chase engaged in the practice of treasure hunting or "money digging". Neighbors, such as physician John Stafford, recalled that Chase's sister Sally used a seer stone to locate treasure.

Chase lived "over the hill to the East" of the Smiths in Palmyra. In 1833, Chase swore an affidavit that was published in the book Mormonism Unvailed by E. D. Howe.

According to Chase, Joseph Smith collaborated with seer Samuel T. Lawrence. Chase reported that "Joseph believed that one Samuel T. Lawrence was the man alluded to by the spirit, and went with him to a singular looking hill, in Manchester, and [showed] him where the treasure was."

Lawrence who was able to "see" not only the gold plates but also "saw" the pair of spectacles, which in Mormonism would later be identified with the biblical Urim and Thummim.

=== Chase attempts to obtain the plates ===
Although Chase's affidavit makes no mention of it, Lucy Mack Smith recalled that Chase and others attempted to obtain the Golden Plates themselves. Lucy wrote: "10 or 12 men were clubbed together with one Willard Chase, a Methodist class leader at their head, and what was most ridiculous they had sent for a conjuror to come 60 miles to divine the place where the record was deposited".

=== Martin Harris ===
Chase recalls that Smith "met one day in the streets of Palmyra, a rich man, whose name was Martin Harris, and addressed him thus; 'I have a commandment from God to ask the first man I meet in the street to give me fifty dollars, to assist me in doing the work of the Lord by translating the Golden Bible.'".

Chase recalls that Harris "reported that the Prophet's wife ... would be delivered of a male child that would be able when two years old to translate the Gold Bible."

=== Abel D. Chase ===
In 1879, Chase's brother Abel Chase gave a sworn statement re-asserting claims Willard had made and asserting that the 1833 affidavit was genuine.

== Inspiration for the Salamander letter ==
The Chase Affidavit was a source of inspiration for the Salamander letter, a 20th-century forgery by Mark Hofmann. The Chase Affidavit describes "something like a toad", which was used as the source for Hofmann's "white salamander".
