= Lost 116 pages =

Early Mormon religious text

The "Lost 116 Pages" were the original manuscript pages of what Joseph Smith, founder of the Latter Day Saint movement, said was the translation of the Book of Lehi, the first portion of the golden plates revealed to him by an angel in 1827. These pages, which had not been copied, were lost by Smith's scribe, Martin Harris, during the summer of 1828 and are presumed to have been destroyed. Smith completed the Book of Mormon without retranslating the Book of Lehi, replacing it with what he said was an abridgment taken from the Plates of Nephi.

== Background ==
Joseph Smith said that on September 22, 1827, he had recovered a set of buried golden plates in a prominent hill near his parents' farm in Manchester, New York. Martin Harris, a respectable farmer from nearby Palmyra, became an early believer and gave Smith $50 (equivalent to $1,423 in 2025) to finance the translation of the plates. Lucy Harris, Martin's wife, also donated some of her own money and offered to give more, even though Smith denied her request to see the plates and told her that "in relation to assistance, I always prefer dealing with men rather than their wives."

Smith and his wife, Emma, moved to her hometown of Harmony, Pennsylvania, in late December 1827, where he began dictating the Book of Mormon. When Harris left Palmyra to visit Smith without taking his wife along, she became suspicious that Smith intended to defraud her and her husband.

When Harris returned, Lucy refused to share his bed, and she had a suitor of her daughter surreptitiously copy the characters on the Anthon transcript that Smith had given to Harris. Lucy then accompanied her husband back to Harmony in April 1828, when Martin agreed to serve as Smith's scribe. Before returning home after two weeks, Lucy searched the Smith house and grounds for the plates but was unable to locate them. Smith said he did not need their physical presence to create the transcription and that they were hidden in nearby woods.

== Harris as Smith's scribe ==
From April to June 1828, Harris acted as Smith's scribe as Smith dictated the manuscript using the Urim and Thummim and seer stones. By the middle of June, Smith had dictated about 116 manuscript pages of text.

Harris continued to have doubts about the authenticity of the manuscript, and he "could not forget his wife's skepticism or the hostile queries of Palmyra's tavern crowd." Smith's mother, Lucy, "said that Harris asked Joseph for a look at the plates, for 'a further witness of their actual existence and that he might be better able to give a reason for the hope that was within him.' When that request was denied, he asked about the manuscript. Could he at least take it home to reassure his wife?" After denying his request twice, Smith, with a great deal of uneasiness, said that the Lord had given permission, and he allowed Harris to take the manuscript pages back to Palmyra on condition that he show them to only five named family members. He even made Harris bind himself in a solemn oath.

== The manuscript disappears ==
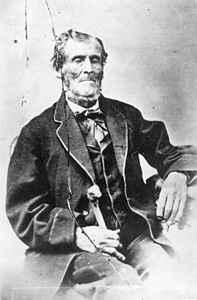
Martin Harris at age 87, more than forty years after he lost the manuscript

When Harris returned home, he showed the manuscript to his wife, who allowed him to lock them in her bureau. Harris then showed the pages not only to the named relatives but "to any friend who came along." On one occasion Harris picked the lock of the bureau and damaged it, irritating his wife. The manuscript then disappeared.

Shortly after Harris left Harmony, Smith's wife gave birth to Smith's firstborn son, who was "very much deformed" and died less than a day after delivery. Emma Smith nearly died herself, and Smith tended her for two weeks. As she slowly gained strength, Smith left her in the care of her mother and went back to Palmyra in search of Harris and the manuscript.

The following day Harris was dragged into the Smith family home in distress and without the pages. Smith urged Harris to search his house again, but Harris told him he had already ripped open beds and pillows. Smith moaned, "Oh, my God! ... All is lost! all is lost! What shall I do? I have sinned—it is I who tempted the wrath of God".

After returning to Harmony without Harris, Smith dictated to Emma his first written revelation, which both rebuked Smith and denounced Harris as "a wicked man." The revelation assured Smith that if he was penitent he would regain his ability to translate.

It is unclear if or when the angel returned the interpreters to Smith. In 1838, Smith said, "Immediately after my return home [to Harmony, Pennsylvania, in about July,] I was walking out a little distance, when Behold the former heavenly messenger appeared and handed to me the Urim and Thummin." Smith said he used the interpreters to receive a revelation (today known as Section 3 of the Doctrine and Covenants); then the angel again took away the plates and interpreters before returning them a few days later. Nevertheless, Lucy Smith's recollection was that an angel had promised that the plates and interpreters would be returned to Smith on September 22, 1828, if he were sufficiently worthy, and David Whitmer and Emma Smith said that the interpreters were not returned at all but that Smith thereafter used one of his seer stones to interpret the plates.

== Resumed dictation and the witnesses ==
Between the loss of the pages during the summer of 1828 and the rapid completion of the Book of Mormon in the spring of 1829, there was a period of quiescence as if Smith were waiting "for help or direction." In April 1829, Smith was joined by Oliver Cowdery, a fellow Vermonter and a distant relation who replaced Harris as scribe. The pace of the dictation then increased so dramatically that, within two months, nearly the entire remainder of the manuscript of the Book of Mormon was completed.

According to Smith, he did not retranslate the material that Harris had lost because he said that if he did, evil men would alter the manuscript in an effort to discredit him. Smith said that instead, he had been divinely ordered to replace the lost material with Nephi's account of the same events. When Smith reached the end of the book, he said he was told that God had foreseen the loss of the early manuscript and had prepared the same history in an abridged format that emphasized religious history, the Small Plates of Nephi. Smith transcribed this portion, and it appears as the first part of the book. When published in 1830, the Book of Mormon contained a statement about the lost 116 pages, as well as the Testimony of Three Witnesses and the Testimony of Eight Witnesses, who claimed to have seen and handled the golden plates. According to Jeffrey R. Holland, an apostle in the Church of Jesus Christ of Latter-day Saints (LDS Church), "it was not tit for tat, this for that—you give me 116 pages of manuscript and I'll give you 142 pages of printed text. Not so: We got back more than we lost. And it was known from the beginning that it would be so."

Nevertheless, the loss of the manuscript provided opponents of Mormonism, such as the 19th-century clergyman M. T. Lamb, with additional reasons to dismiss the religion as a fraud. Fawn Brodie has written that Smith "realized that it was impossible for him to reproduce the story exactly, and that to redictate it would be to invite devastating comparisons. Harris's wife taunted him: 'If this be a divine communication, the same being who revealed it to you can easily replace it.'"

Martin Harris was permitted by Smith to be one of the Three Witnesses. He mortgaged his farm for $3,000 (equivalent to $90,700 in 2025) as security in the event that the Book of Mormon did not sell, and when in fact, it did not, he lost both his farm and his wife. He later disavowed Joseph Smith, left the church, joined several different varieties of early Mormon-related congregations, then at 87 joined the LDS Church and recanted what he had earlier said about Smith. He never disavowed the gold plates, however.

== See also ==
- Mosiah priority
