= Urim and Thummim (Latter Day Saints) =

Instruments used for receiving revelation or translating languages in LDS belief

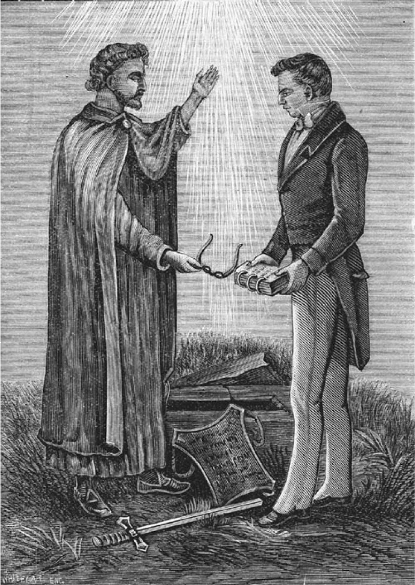
An 1893 engraving of Joseph Smith receiving the Golden Plates and the Urim and Thummim from the angel Moroni. The sword of Laban is shown at the bottom.

In the Latter Day Saint movement, the term Urim and Thummim (/ˈjʊərɪm ... ˈθʌmɪm/) refers to a category of instruments used for receiving revelation or translating languages. According to Latter Day Saint theology, the two stones found in the breastplate of Aaron in the Old Testament, the white stone referenced in the Book of Revelation in the New Testament, the two stones bound by silver bows into a set of spectacles (interpreters) that movement founder Joseph Smith said he found buried in the hill Cumorah with the golden plates, and the seer stone found while digging a well used to translate the Book of Mormon are all examples of Urim and Thummim. Latter Day Saint scripture states that the place where God resides is a Urim and Thummim, and the earth itself will one day become sanctified and a Urim and Thummim, and that all adherents who are saved in the highest heaven will receive their own Urim and Thummim.

While the term is ubiquitous and well ingrained in modern Latter Day Saint theology, it was not initially applied to the spectacles or seer stone used in translating the Book of Mormon, and "Urim and Thummim" does not appear within the Book of Mormon or early versions of the Doctrine and Covenants. It has been argued that Joseph Smith and Oliver Cowdery adopted the term in the early 1830s as part of a larger effort to distance the church from early folk magic practices and retroactively provide a Biblical rationale for their earlier behavior.

== History ==
Joseph Smith said that in 1827 he was led by an angel to dig up golden plates containing a record of ancient inhabitants of the American continent, along with "spectacles", or interpreters, that the Lord had prepared to translate the record. Smith also had in his possession a brown seer stone. He used both devices to produce the record, which is called the Book of Mormon.

The earliest source that expands the term "Urim and Thummim" outside the biblical context is a reverse association William W. Phelps made on Hosea 3:4 in July 1832, stating that the children of Israel "were even to do without the Teraphim, [Urim & Thummim, perhaps] or sacred spectacles or declarers." The first known explicit connection between the spectacles and the term "Urim and Thummim" occurred in 1832. Prior to this, and even frequently afterwards, they were always referred to as "spectacles" or "interpreters".

By 1833, Joseph Smith and his associates began referring to the Smith's seer stone as well as the interpreters with the Biblical term "Urim and Thummim". In January 1833 W. W. Phelps wrote about a possible connection: "It [Book of Mormon] was translated by the gift and power of God, by an unlearned man, through the aid of a pair of Interpreters, or spectacles- (known, perhaps, in ancient days as Teraphim, or Urim and Thummim)". Similarly, Oliver Cowdery wrote in September 1834, "[Smith] translated, with the Urim and Thummim, or, as the Nephites would have said, 'Interpreters'". In 1838, Smith simply stated, "I obtained [the plates], and the Urim and Thummim with them; by the means of which, I translated the plates; and thus came the Book of Mormon."

No mention of the term "Urim and Thummim" exists in the 1833 version of the Book of Commandments, or in early transcriptions of Joseph Smith's revelations. In the 1835 edition of the Doctrine and Covenants, revelations were modified and the term was added.

Verse	1833 Book of Commandments	1835 Doctrine and Covenants
Chapter 9:1 (1833); Section 36:1(1835); Section 10:1 (1981)	Now, behold I say unto you, that because you delivered up so many writings, which you had power to translate, into the hands of a wicked man, you have lost them, and you also lost your gift at the same time ...	Now, behold I say unto you, that because you delivered up those writings which you had power given unto you to translate, by the means of the Urim and Thummim, into the hands of a wicked man, you have lost them; and you also lost your gift at the same time ...
Section 42:1 (1835); Section 17:1 (1981)	[Not Present in 1833 Book of Commandments]	Behold I say unto you, that you must rely upon my word, which if you do, with full purpose of heart, you shall have a view of the plates, and also the breastplate, the sword of Laban, the Urim and Thummim, which were given to the brother of Jared upon the mount, when he talked with the Lord face to face, and the miraculous directors which were given to Lehi while in the wilderness, on the borders of the red sea; and it is by your faith that you shall obtain a view of them, even by that faith which was had by the prophets of old.

Apostle Orson Pratt gave an expansive definition in 1851 stating: "The Urim and Thummim is a stone or other substance sanctified and illuminated by the Spirit of the living God, and presented to those who are blessed with the gift of seeing." Emma Smith, Joseph Smith's wife and scribe for part of the Book of Mormon, made a clear distinction between the two in an 1870 letter, "The first that my husband translated, was translated by the use of the Urim, and Thummim [i.e. spectacles or interpreters], and that was the part that Martin Harris lost, after that he used a small stone, not exactly, black, but was rather a dark color."

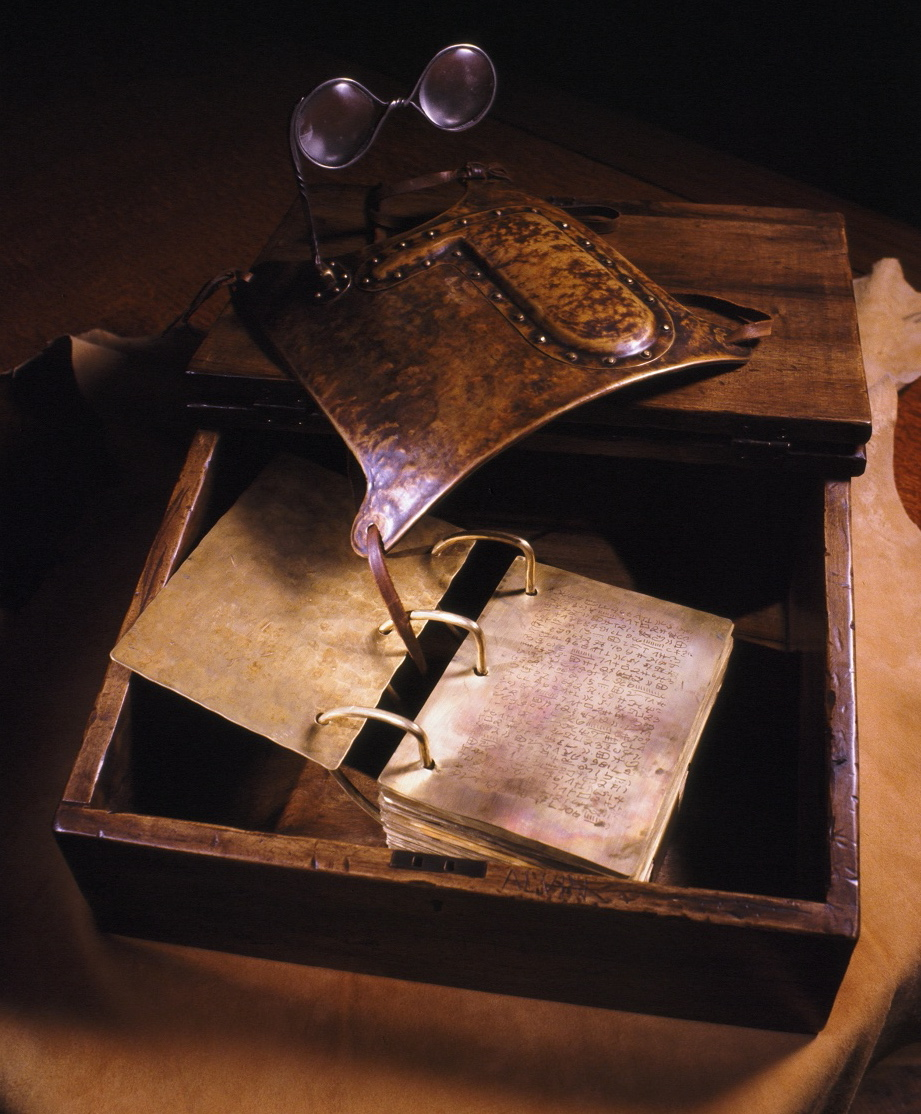
Artistic depiction of interpreters based on J.W. Peterson's influential 1921 recollection of an 1890 interview with Joseph Smith's brother William

By the beginning of the 20th century, members of the Church of Jesus Christ of Latter-day Saints (LDS Church) grew to see the "Urim and Thummim" as completely dissociated from seer stones, a distinction that persists today among many members of the church. This disassociation is typified by church leader Bruce R. McConkie who wrote: "the Prophet had a seer stone which was separate and distinct from the Urim and Thummim."

=== Reasons for adoption of the term ===
The motive for adopting the term 'Urim and Thummim' is the subject of continued debate and ongoing study.

The general consensus is that it was part of a larger effort to de-emphasize early folk magic practices, and bring them into the mainstream. Joseph Smith was put on trial in 1826, and twice in 1830 for practicing folk magic and being a disorderly person or "glass looker" (stone gazer). Fear of further litigation and shifting cultural attitudes towards the acceptability of folk magic in 1830 American society led Smith to remove allusions to folk magic elements in his early life (such as magical treasure-seeking activities, divining rods, magic circles and seer stones)

Some apologists within the LDS Church argue that Smith never used the seer stone in the translation, that the term 'Urim and Thummim' is not a later development, and accuse those who make a distinction of being revisionist historians.

Recent publications by the LDS Church acknowledge the shift in terminology occurring in the early 1830s, but do not speculate on reasons for doing so. Apologetic site FAIR attributes the change to early Latter Day Saints noticing similarities between the biblical devices and the Nephite interpreters, the term naturally entered the vernacular over time, and that "use of the term Urim and Thummim has unfortunately obscured the fact that all such devices belong in the same class of consecrated revelatory aids and that more than one were used in the translation."

== Interpreters (Spectacles) ==
In 1827, Smith said that he had been visited again by the angel who had previously revealed the location of the golden plates, along with other items such as the Urim and Thummim, and that these objects were buried in a nearby hillside. After Martin Harris lost 116 pages of the Book of Mormon manuscript in June 1828, Smith said that the Angel Moroni took back the plates and interpreters. Later, the plates and interpreters were returned. Several accounts have him translating exclusively with the seer stone from that point on. David Whitmer was asked in 1855 the role of the Interpreters in the translation of the Book of Mormon and responded:

"[Joseph Smith] used a stone called a 'Seers stone,' the 'Interpreters' having been taken away from him because of transgression. The 'Interpreters' were taken from Joseph after he allowed Martin Harris to carry away the 116 pages of Ms of the Book of Mormon as a punishment, but he was allowed to go on and translate by the use of a 'Seers stone' which he had, and which he placed in a hat into which he buried his face, stating to me and others that the original character appeared upon parchment and under it the translation in English."

Smith said that after translating the Book of Mormon, he returned the plates and the Urim and Thummim to the angel, whom he identified as the resurrected Moroni. Smith reportedly told Orson Pratt that the Lord gave him the Urim and Thummim when he was an inexperienced translator but that as he grew in experience, he no longer needed such assistance.

What the interpreters looked like, and how they were used has been the source of debate, as there are several conflicting descriptions. These different descriptions, and Smith's silence on the mode of translation, has led to a wide range of artistic interpretations. How the interpreters were used in the translation is also unknown. Joseph Smith answered when asked on the particulars of translation, "It was not intended to tell the world all the particulars of the coming forth of the book of Mormon." The majority of the descriptions of the translation with the interpreters have Smith looking through transparent, glass-like stones at the text, and it being converted into English words. Confusing the matter, are a few accounts that have Smith putting the spectacles in a hat and reading words off the surface of the stones as they would appear, although this could be a conflation with the seer stone, which Smith did put into a hat and read from.

Notable descriptions of the interpreters
Person	Source	Eyewitness	Note	Description
Martin Harris	September 5, 1829 Newspaper	Yes	The earliest known description	"Martin Harris states that after the third visit from the same spirit in a dream he proceeded to the spot, removed the earth, and there found the Bible, together with a large pair of spectacles"
Oliver Cowdery	Report in a magazine on 1830 trial	Yes	Source is antagonistic, but the only detailed description Cowdery gave	"Oliver Cowdry, one of the three witnesses to the book, testified under oath, that said Smith found with the plates, from which he translated his book, two transparent stones, resembling glass, set in silver bows. That by looking through these, he was able to read in English, the formed Egyptian characters, which were engraved on the plates."
Oliver Cowdery	Richard McNemar, Diary entry for January 29, 1831	No	Source is a Shaker who made a personal diary entry after hearing Cowdery preach in Ohio. Mentions both the spectacles and the hat	"...there is said to have been in the box with the plates two transparent stones in the form of spectacles thro which the translator looked on the engraving & afterwards put his face into a hat & the interpretation then flowed into his mind. which he uttered to the amanuensis who wrote it down, The said amanuensis by name Oliver Cowdery, was lately at the North lot & gave this account . . . there being no intelligible correspondence between the marks on the plates, & the dictates of the pretended interpreter. All his ideas were acquired by looking into a hat, where in all probability the translation appeared quite plainly in our english language."
Joseph Smith	1838 History of the Church	Yes	First mention of being connected to the breastplates	"...there were two stones in silver bows and these (~~put in~~ <stones fastened> to a breast plate) ~~which~~ constituted what is called the Urim & Thummin deposited with the plates, and <the possession and use of these stones> ~~that~~ was what constituted seers in ancient or former times and that God <had> prepared them for the purpose of translating the book."
Joseph Smith	March 1842 Church History	Yes		"With the records was found a curious instrument which the ancients called 'Urim and Thummim', which consisted of two transparent stones set in the rim of a bow fastened to a breastplate. Through the medium of the Urim and Thummim I translated the record by the gift, and power of God."
Lucy Mack Smith	1853 History	No	Carried on Joseph Smiths person not attached to a breastplate, showed "with no covering but a silk handkerchief."	"It consisted of two smooth three-cornered diamonds set in glass, and the glasses were set in silver bows, which were connected with each other in much the same way as old-fashioned spectacles."
Martin Harris	Interview with Periodical	Yes	Most accounts refer to them as clear, not opaque.	"The two stones set in a bow of silver were about two inches in diameter, perfectly round, and about five-eighths of an inch thick at the centre; but not so thick at the edges where they came into the bow. They were joined by a round bar of silver, about three-eighths of an inch in diameter, and about four inches long, which, with the two stones, would make eight inches. The stones were white, like polished marble, with a few gray streaks."
William Smith	1921 recollection of an 1890 J.W. Peterson interview	No	Only source for a rod holding the interpreters out from the breastplate	"Explaining the expression as to the stones in the Urim and thummim being set in two rims of a bow he said: A silver bow ran over one stone, under the other, around over that one and under the first in the shape of a horizontal figure 8 much like a pair of spectacles. That they were much too large for Joseph and he could only see through one at a time using sometimes one and sometimes the other. By putting his head in a hat or some dark object it was not necessary to close one eye while looking through the stone with the other. In that way sometimes when his eyes grew tires [tired] he relieved them of the strain. He also said the Urim and Thummim was attached to the breastplate by a rod which was fastened at the outer shoulde[r] edge of the breastplate and to the end of the silver bow. This rod was just the right length so that when the Urim and thummim was removed from before the eyes it woul<d> reac<h> to a pocked [pocket?] on the left side of the breastplate where the instrument was kept when not in use by the Seer."

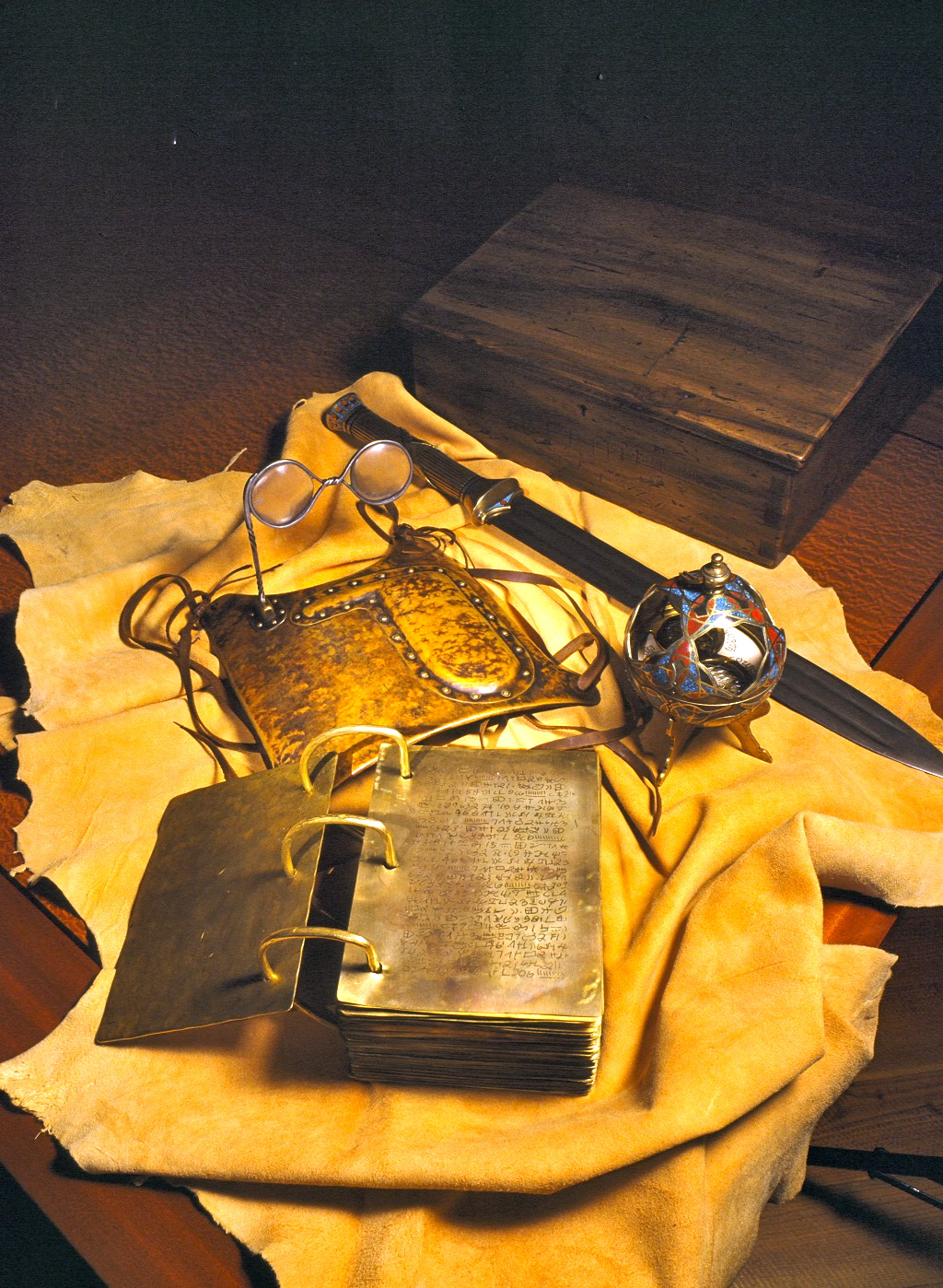
A 21st-century artistic representation of the golden plates, Urim and Thummim, Sword of Laban, and Liahona

== Beliefs ==
Many Latter Day Saints believe that the Urim and Thummim of Joseph Smith and the Book of Mormon were the functional equivalent of the Urim and Thummim mentioned in the Old Testament.

In the Book of Mormon, the prophets the Brother of Jared and Mosiah both used devices called "interpreters" to receive revelation for their people. In the Doctrine and Covenants, it states that the Urim and Thummim Smith originally possessed was the same one possessed by the Jaredites. In the Book of Abraham, which Smith said he translated from Egyptian Papyri, the prophet Abraham used a Urim and Thummim given to him in the city Ur to receive a revelation from God about astronomy.

In 1841, apostles Wilford Woodruff and George A. Smith confiscated several seer stones and grimoires from convert William Mountford in Staffordshire, England. The grimoires were destroyed and seer stones were sent to Nauvoo. Joseph Smith examined the stones and stated that they were "Urim and Thummim as good as ever was upon the earth" but that they had been "consecrated to devils."

In 1842 Joseph Smith taught that the Nephites would use a Urim and Thummim during times of war to gain an advantage over the Lamanites.

In 1843, William Clayton wrote in his journal a theologically significant discussion he had with Smith that later became canonized as Section 130 of the Doctrine and Covenants:

"The angels do not reside on a planet like this Earth; but they reside in the presence of God, on a globe like a sea of glass and fire, where all things for their glory are manifest, past, present, and future, and are continually before the Lord. The place where God resides is a great Urim and Thummim. This Earth, in its sanctified and immortal state, will be made like unto crystal and will be a Urim and Thummim to the inhabitants who dwell thereon, whereby all things pertaining to an inferior kingdom, or all kingdoms of a lower order, will be manifest to those who dwell on it; and this earth will be Christ's. Then the white stone mentioned in Revelation 2:17, will become a Urim and Thummim to each individual who receives one, whereby things pertaining to a higher order of kingdoms will be made known; and a white stone is given to each of those who come into the celestial kingdom."

Apostle Orson Pratt taught that the biblical Noah had a Urim and Thummim, and used it to obtain direction for building the ark.

== See also ==
- Book of Abraham
- Crystal gazing
- Cunning folk traditions and the Latter Day Saint movement
- Reformed Egyptian
- Scrying
