= Seer stone (Latter Day Saints) =

Religious objects of the early Latter Day Saint movement

Many members of the Church of Jesus Christ of Latter-day Saints believe that Joseph Smith used this seer stone (along with two others dubbed the "Urim and Thummim") in the Book of Mormon translation effort.

According to Latter Day Saint theology, seer stones were used by Joseph Smith, as well as ancient prophets, to receive revelations from God. Members of the Church of Jesus Christ of Latter-day Saints (LDS Church) believe that Smith used seer stones to translate the Book of Mormon.

The culture that early Latter Day Saints developed in was steeped in Western esotericism, which included American folk magic practices. A seer stone in this culture was a prevalent divination tool used for a form of crystal gazing, or scrying.

Seer stones are mentioned in the Book of Mormon in the Book of Mosiah, where they are also called "interpreters" and described as being used by seers to translate and receive revelations. The term "Urim and Thummim" is usually used by Latter Day Saints members to refer to the "interpreters" mentioned in the Book of Mormon. Some Latter Day Saints use the term Urim and Thummim and seer stones interchangeably.

Smith owned at least two seer stones before his early twenties, when he had employed them for treasure seeking at the bequest of Josiah Stowell, before he founded the church. Other early Mormons, such as Hiram Page, David Whitmer, and Jacob Whitmer, also owned seer stones.

== Seer stones and treasure-hunting ==
Some early-19th-century Americans used seer stones in attempts to gain revelations from God or to find buried treasure. From about 1819, Smith regularly practiced scrying, a form of divination in which a "seer" looked into a seer stone to receive supernatural knowledge. Smith's usual procedure was to place the stone in a white stovepipe hat, put his face over the hat to block the light, and "see" the necessary information in the stone's reflections. Smith and his father achieved "something of a mysterious local reputation in the profession—mysterious because there is no record that they ever found anything despite the readiness of some local residents to pay for their efforts."

In late 1825, Josiah Stowell, a well-to-do farmer from South Bainbridge, Chenango County, New York, was searching for a lost Spanish mine near Harmony Township, Susquehanna County, Pennsylvania with another seer. Stowell traveled to Manchester to hire Smith "on account of having heard that he possessed certain keys, by which he could discern things invisible to the natural eye." Smith worked with the Stowell-Hale team for approximately one month, attempting, according to their contract, to locate "a valuable mine of either Gold or Silver and also...coined money and bars or ingots of Gold or Silver". According to an uncorroborated account by Hale, Smith attempted to locate the mine by burying his face in a hat containing the seer stone; however, as the treasure hunters got close to their objective, Smith said that an enchantment became so strong that Smith could no longer see it. The failed project disbanded on November 17, 1825; however, Smith continued to work for Stowell on other matters until 1826.

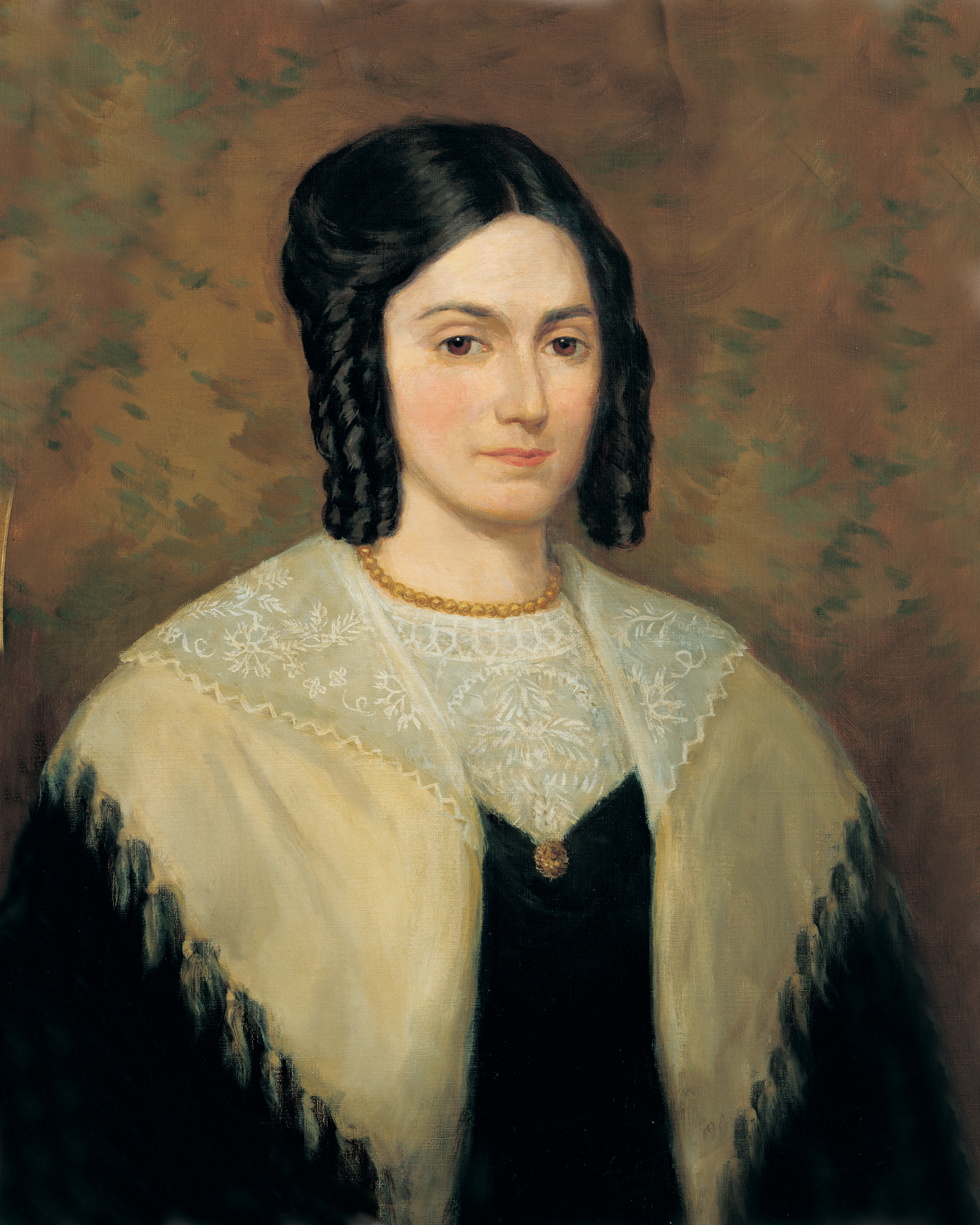
Emma Hale Smith

In 1826, Smith was arrested and brought to court in Bainbridge, New York, on the complaint of Stowell's nephew who accused Smith of being "a disorderly person and an imposter." Court records show that Smith, identified as "The Glass Looker," stood before the court on March 20, 1826, on a warrant for an unspecified misdemeanor charge, and that the judge issued a mittimus for Smith to be held, either during or after the proceedings. Although Smith's associate Oliver Cowdery later stated that Smith was "honorably acquitted," the result of the proceeding is unclear, with some claiming he was found guilty, others claiming he was "condemned" but "designedly allowed to escape," and yet others (including the trial note taker) claiming he was "discharged" for lack of evidence.

Martin Harris said that Smith once found a pin in a pile of shavings with the aid of a stone. Smith had at least two seer stones, including a white stone that he found in about 1819, and a chocolate-colored stone that he found in 1822. His favored stone, chocolate-colored and about the size of an egg, was found in a deep well he helped dig for one of his neighbors. In 1827, Smith said he obtained the "Urim and Thummim" which was composed of two white stones, different from the previous two.

== Seer stones and the Book of Mormon ==
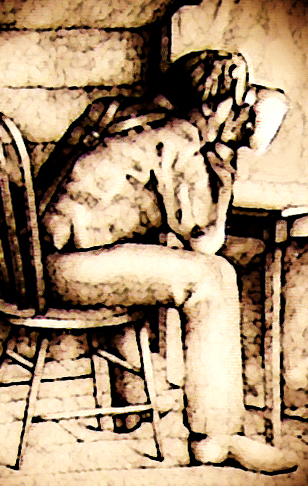
A 21st-century artistic representation of Joseph Smith translating the golden plates by examining a seer stone in his hat.

In 1823, Smith said that an angel told him of the existence of golden plates along with "two stones in silver bows" fastened to a breastplate that the angel said God had prepared for translating the plates. In dictating the Book of Mormon, Smith said he used these "interpreters," which he later referred to as "Urim and Thummim." Smith's wife, Emma, said that Smith used the Urim and Thummim to translate the lost 116 pages of the manuscript, but that Smith translated the published Book of Mormon using the single chocolate-colored stone that he had previously used in treasure-quests.

David Whitmer said, regarding Smith's translation of the Book of Mormon:

Joseph Smith put the seer stone into a hat, and put his face in the hat, drawing it closely around his face to exclude the light; and in the darkness the spiritual light would shine. A piece of something resembling parchment would appear, and on that appeared the writing. One character at a time would appear, and under it was the interpretation in English. Brother Joseph would read off the English to Oliver Cowdery, who was his principal scribe, and when it was written down and repeated to Brother Joseph to see if it was correct, then it would disappear, and another character with the interpretation would appear. Thus the Book of Mormon was translated by the gift and power of God, and not by any power of man.

— David Whitmer, "An Address to All Believers in Christ" (1887), 12; Quinn (1998, p. 172).

Other early Mormons, among whom were Jacob and David Whitmer, Philo Dibble, W. W. Phelps, and Elizabeth Ann Whitney, valued seer stones. In 1830, Hiram Page, one of the Eight Witnesses to the Book of Mormon, stated he had a series of revelations through a black seer stone. After Smith announced that these revelations were of the devil, Page agreed to discard the stone which, according to a contemporary, was "Broke to powder and the writings Burnt." Apparently, the apostasy of some early Mormon believers can be traced to Smith's move away from the use of seer stones. The Whitmer family, devoted to their importance, "later said their disenchantment with Mormonism began when Joseph Smith stopped using his seer stone as an instrument of revelation." In November 1837, the Kirtland high council disfellowshipped 11-year-old James C. Brewster, his parents, and several associates for claiming that he had "the gift of seeing and looking through or into a stone." Nevertheless, some Mormons continued to believe in the power of seer stones. After Smith's death, Brigham Young endorsed their use. In 1855, he reminisced, "Joseph said there is a [seer] Stone for every person on Earth." At the first general conference after Smith's death, Young declared, "The president of the priests has a right to the Urim and Thummim, which gives revelation." James Strang, who led a small breakaway group after Smith's death, proclaiming himself Smith's successor, claimed he unearthed ancient metal plates, known as the Voree plates, and translated them using a seer stone.

== Urim and Thummim ==
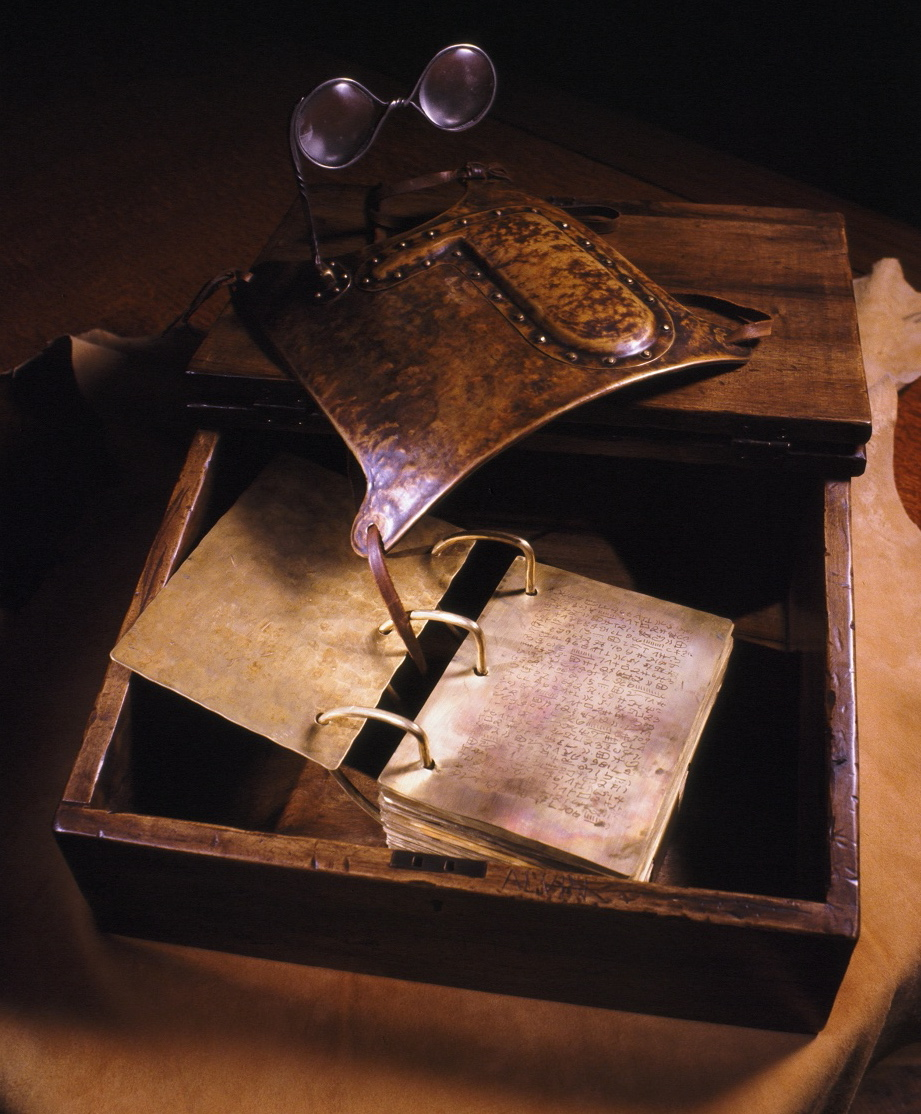
A 21st-century reconstruction of the golden plates and the Urim and Thummim connected to a breastplate.

In the Book of Mormon, prophets such as the Brother of Jared and Mosiah used devices called "interpreters" to receive revelation for their people, and the Doctrine and Covenants declares these interpreters to have been Urim and Thummim.

The LDS Church teaches that the Urim and Thummim used by Smith and the Book of Mormon were the functional equivalent of the Urim and Thummim mentioned in the Old Testament. There is no indication whether or not the Old Testament Urim and Thummim were used to translate documents. Some church members believe that there were three different Urim and Thummim: that of the Old Testament and two mentioned in the Book of Mormon, one used by the Jaredites and the other by King Mosiah. (The Church teaches that the one used by Smith is the one originally possessed by the Jaredites.)

Sometime after 1828, Smith and his early contemporaries began to use the terms "seer stone" and "Urim and Thummim" interchangeably, referring to Smith's brown stone as a "Urim and Thummim." D. Michael Quinn argues Smith eventually began using "biblical terminology to mainstream an instrument and practice of folk magic... There was no reference to the Urim and Thummim in the headings of the Book of Commandments (1833) or in the headings of the only editions of the Doctrine and Covenants prepared during Smith's life." Early Mormons often referred to Smith's seer stone as "the Urim and Thummim," and Quinn refers to the term "Urim and Thummim" as a "euphemism for Joseph Smith's seer stone." The LDS Church has suggested that Smith and others "seem to have understood the term [Urim and Thummim] more as a descriptive category of instruments for obtaining divine revelations and less as the name of a specific instrument".

== Seer stones after 1830 ==
After finishing the Book of Mormon translation, Smith is said to have given his brown seer stone to Oliver Cowdery, but he occasionally used his white stone to gain revelations, including his translation of what later became known as the Book of Abraham. There is no evidence that Smith used the stone to dictate any of the Doctrine and Covenants revelations after November 1830. During his work on his Bible translation, Smith told Orson Pratt he had stopped using the stone because he had become acquainted with "the Spirit of Prophecy and Revelation" and no longer needed it. Nevertheless, in 1855, Brigham Young told the apostles that Smith had had five seer stones, and Young made it clear that Smith "did not regard his seer stones simply as relics of his youth" but had found others while church president.

According to apostle Joseph Fielding Smith, the LDS Church owns one of Smith's seer stones. Nevertheless, since the nineteenth century, no president of the church has openly used such a stone in his role as "prophet, seer, and revelator".

In August 2015, the LDS Church released images of one of Smith's seer stones—a rounded, smoothed, brown and black stone—in a volume of the Joseph Smith Papers Project containing the printer's manuscript of the Book of Mormon. The stone shown in the released images has been identified by geologists as a form of jasper, found in a banded iron formation, thus called banded jasper.

== See also ==
- Cunning folk traditions and the Latter Day Saint movement
