= Joseph Knight Sr. =

Early supporter of Latter Day Saint movement founder Joseph Smith

Personal details
- Born: Joseph Knight; November 26, 1772; Oakham, Massachusetts Bay Colony, British Colonial America
- Died: February 2, 1847 (aged 74); Mount Pisgah, Iowa, United States
- Baptism Date: 28 June 1830
- Residence: Colesville, New York (1808–1831); Liberty, Missouri (1833–ca. 1840); Nauvoo, Illinois (ca. 1840–1846)
- Occupation: Farmer, miller
- Spouse(s): Polly Peck (m. 1796; d. 1831); Phebe Crosby Peck (m. 1833)
- Children: 8, inc. Newel Knight
- Parents: Benjamin Knight; Sarah Crouch

Joseph Knight Sr. (November 26, 1772 – February 2, 1847) was a close associate of Joseph Smith, founder of the Latter Day Saint movement. Knight provided significant material support to Smith's translation and publication of the Book of Mormon.

== Life ==
Knight was born in Oakham, Massachusetts. In 1795, he married Polly Peck. By 1800 they were living in Vermont. They moved to Colesville, New York, in 1808. Among Knight's children was Newel Knight.

=== Latter Day Saint movement ===
Knight first met Joseph Smith while Smith was working for Josiah Stowell. Knight later hired the 20-year-old Smith to work for him. Knight owned four farms, a gristmill, and two carding machines. Knight assisted Smith in his courting of Emma Hale by lending him his sled. The Smiths also borrowed Knight's wagon when they went to pick up the golden plates from the Hill Cumorah.

Knight is addressed in a section of the Doctrine and Covenants dated to May 1829. He is also addressed briefly in a section dated to April 1830.

Knight was baptized into the Church of Christ on 28 June 1830. All his children, their spouses, his sister, and three of his wife's siblings, along with their spouses joined the church. The Knight family constituted the Colesville Branch, the first branch in the church. They later sold their homes and properties and migrated as a group to Thompson, Ohio, where they settled on the farm of Leman Copley, a former Shaker who had become a Latter Day Saint. Shortly after this Copley left the church, and forced the Colesville Saints to leave his farm so they then migrated to Jackson County, Missouri.

Knight and his family were driven from Jackson County in the Mormon persecutions of 1832–33 and eventually settled in Caldwell County, Missouri. They were driven from Missouri entirely in the winter of 1838–39 and settled shortly thereafter at Nauvoo, Illinois. The Knights became, in effect, a prototype of all those hundreds of Saints who were bodily thrust from Jackson to Clay County, from Clay to Caldwell County, and later from the state. The personal descriptions and notarized statements that express their sufferings and losses become an index to the difficulties that whole mass of exiled people experienced.

Knight was a member of the Nauvoo Masonic Lodge.

The Knights left Nauvoo with the majority of Latter Day Saints in 1846, and journeyed west with the Mormon pioneers. Knight died on the trek west at Mount Pisgah, Iowa.

== Legacy ==
The Knight family can rightly claim many notable contributions to the establishment of the church. The Knights gave generously of their material holdings and, very literally, their lives for the restored gospel. The high mortality rate of the immediate and extended family was undoubtedly increased by their association with the unpopular Mormon cause. [In his book, "They Are My Friends", William G. Hartley,] graphically portrays their losses along the way. Joseph Smith, recognizing these sacrifices, extolled their loyalty both publicly and in his personal writings, as Smith acknowledged the Knights as his “friends.” —Larry C. Porter

A tourist attraction in Nineveh, New York, the former ancestral home of Joseph Knight Sr., is listed as the number one thing to do by Tripadvisor in the city.
