= Golden plates =

Metallic plates from which Joseph Smith allegedly translated the Book of Mormon

According to Latter Day Saint belief, the golden plates (also called the gold plates or in some 19th-century literature, the golden bible) are the source from which Joseph Smith translated the Book of Mormon, a sacred text of the faith. Some accounts from people who reported handling the plates describe the plates as weighing from 30 to 60 pounds (14 to 27 kg), gold in color, and composed of thin metallic pages engraved with hieroglyphics on both sides and bound with three D-shaped rings.

Smith said that he found the plates on September 22, 1823, on a hill near his home in Manchester, New York, after the angel Moroni directed him to a buried stone box. He said that the angel prevented him from taking the plates but instructed him to return to the same location in a year. He returned to that site every year, but it was not until September 22, 1827, that he recovered the plates on his fourth annual attempt to retrieve them. He returned home with a heavy object wrapped in a frock, which he then put in a box. He allowed others to heft the box but said that the angel had forbidden him to show the plates to anyone until they had been translated from their original "reformed Egyptian" language.

Smith dictated the text of the plates while a scribe wrote down the words which would later become the Book of Mormon. Eyewitnesses to the process said Smith translated the plates, not by looking directly at them, but by looking through a transparent seer stone in the bottom of his hat. Smith published the first edition of the translation in March 1830 as the Book of Mormon, with a print run of 5,000 copies at a production cost of $3,000 (or 60 cents per book).

Smith obtained testimonies from 11 men who said that they had seen the plates, known as the Book of Mormon witnesses. After the translation was complete, Smith said that he returned the plates to the angel Moroni; thus, they could not be re-examined. Latter Day Saints believe the account of the golden plates as a matter of faith, while critics often assert that Smith manufactured them himself.

== Origin and historicity ==
In the words of Mormon historian Richard Bushman, "For most modern readers, the plates are beyond belief, a phantasm, yet the Mormon sources accept them as fact." Smith said that he returned the plates to the angel Moroni after he finished translating them, and their authenticity cannot be determined by physical examination. They were reportedly shown to several close associates of Smith. Mormon scholars have formed collaborations such as Foundation for Ancient Research and Mormon Studies to provide apologetic answers to critical research about the golden plates and topics in the field of Mormon studies. The credibility of the plates has been a "troublesome item", according to Bushman.

The Book of Mormon itself portrays the golden plates as a historical record, engraved by two pre-Columbian prophet-historians from around the year AD 400: Mormon and his son Moroni. Mormon and Moroni, the book says, had abridged earlier historical records from other sets of metal plates. Their script, according to the book, was described as "reformed Egyptian", a language unknown to linguists or Egyptologists. Scholarly reference works on languages do not acknowledge the existence of either a "reformed Egyptian" language or "reformed Egyptian" script as it has been described in Mormon belief, and there is no archaeological, linguistic, or other evidence of the use of Egyptian writing in ancient America. Historically, Latter Day Saint movement denominations have taught that the Book of Mormon's description of the plates' origin is accurate, and that the Book of Mormon is a translation of the plates. The Community of Christ, however, accepts the Book of Mormon as scripture but no longer takes an official position on the historicity of the golden plates. Some adherents accept the Book of Mormon as inspired scripture but do not believe that it is a literal translation of a physical historical record, even in the more theologically conservative Church of Jesus Christ of Latter-day Saints (LDS Church).

Non-Mormons and some liberal Mormons have advanced naturalistic explanations for the story of the plates. For example, it has been theorized that the plates were fashioned by Smith or one of his associates, that Smith had the ability to convince others of their existence through illusions or hypnosis, or that witnesses were having ecstatic visions.

== Story ==
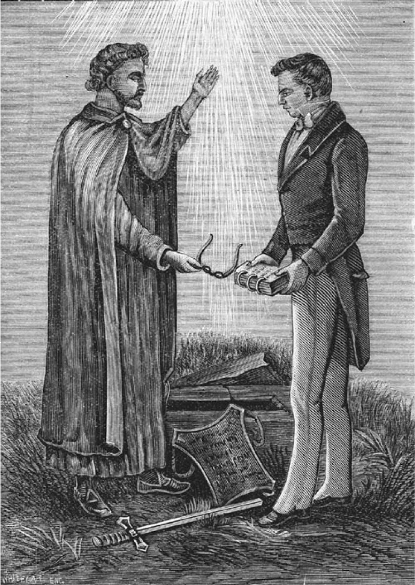
An 1893 engraving depicting Joseph Smith's description of receiving artifacts from the angel Moroni. The artifacts include the golden plates and a set of spectacles made of seer stones, which Smith called the Urim and Thummim. The sword of Laban and an ancient breastplate are shown nearby.

The story of the golden plates consists of how, according to Joseph Smith and his contemporaries, the plates were found, received from the angel Moroni, translated, and returned to the angel before the publication of the Book of Mormon. Smith is the only source for a great deal of the story because much of it occurred while he was the only human witness. Nevertheless, Smith told the story to his family, friends, and acquaintances, and many of them provided second-hand accounts. Other parts of the story are derived from the statements of those who knew Smith, including several witnesses who said that they saw the golden plates.

The best-known elements of the golden plates story are found in an account told by Smith in 1838 and incorporated into the official church histories of some Latter Day Saint movement denominations. The LDS Church has canonized part of this 1838 account as part of its scripture, the Pearl of Great Price.

=== Background ===
During the Second Great Awakening, Joseph Smith lived on his parents' farm near Palmyra, New York. At the time, churches in the region contended so vigorously for souls that western New York later became known as the "burned-over district" because the fires of religious revivals had burned over it so often. Western New York was also noted for its participation in a "craze for treasure hunting". Beginning as a youth in the early 1820s, Smith was periodically hired, for about $14 per month, as a scryer, using what were termed "seer stones" in attempts to locate lost items and buried treasure. Smith's contemporaries described his method for seeking treasure as putting the stone in a white stovepipe hat, putting his face over the hat to block the light, and then "seeing" the information in the reflections of the stone.

According to Richard Bushman, Smith did not consider himself to be a "peeper" or "glass-looker", a practice he is said to have called "nonsense", despite his use of seer stones. Rather, Smith and his family viewed their folk magical practices as spiritual gifts. Although Smith later rejected his youthful treasure-hunting activities as frivolous and immaterial, he never repudiated the stones themselves, denied their presumed power to find treasure, or ever relinquished the magic culture in which he was raised. He came to view seeing with a stone in religious terms as the work of a "seer". Smith's first stone, apparently the same one that he used at least part of the time to translate the golden plates, was chocolate-colored and about the size of a chicken egg, found in a deep well he helped dig for one of his neighbors. The LDS Church released photographs of the stone on August 4, 2015.

=== Finding the plates ===
According to Smith, he found the plates after he was directed to them by a heavenly messenger whom he later identified as the angel Moroni. According to the story, the angel first visited Smith's bedroom late at night, on September 22 in 1822 or 1823. Moroni told Smith that the plates could be found buried in a prominent hill near his home, later called Cumorah, a name found in the Book of Mormon. Before dawn, Moroni reappeared two more times and repeated the information. However, the angel would not allow Smith to take the plates until he obeyed certain "commandments". Smith recorded some of these commandments but made it clear the main thrust of Moroni's message was that he had to keep God's commandments in general. Some contemporaries who later claimed he told them the story said there were others, some of which are relevant to the modern debate about whether or how closely events of early Mormonism were related to the practice of contemporary folk magic. Smith's writings say that the angel required at least the following: (1) that he have no thought of using the plates for monetary gain, (2) that he tell his father about the vision, and (3) that he never show the plates to any unauthorized person. Smith's contemporaries who claimed to have heard the story, both sympathetic and unsympathetic, generally agreed that Smith mentioned the following additional commandments: (4) that Smith take the plates and leave the site in which they had been buried without looking back, and (5) that the plates never directly touch the ground until they were safe at home in a locked chest. Some unsympathetic listeners who allegedly heard the story from Smith or his father recalled that Smith had said the angel required him (6) to wear "black clothes" to the place where the plates were buried, (7) to ride a "black horse with a switchtail", (8) to call for the plates by a certain name, and (9) to "give thanks to God."

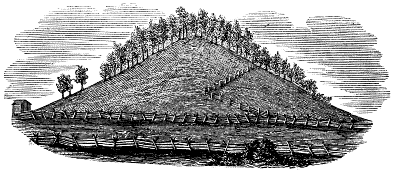
An 1841 engraving of "Mormon Hill" (looking south), where Smith said he found the golden plates on the west side, near the peak

In the morning, Smith began work as usual and did not mention the visions to his father because, he said, he did not think his father would believe him. Smith said he then fainted because he had been awake all night, and while unconscious, the angel appeared a fourth time and chastised him for failing to tell the visions to his father. When Smith then told all to his father, he believed his son and encouraged him to obey the angel's commands. Smith then set off to visit the hill, later stating that he used his seer stone to locate the place that the plates were buried but that he "knew the place the instant that [he] arrived there."

Smith said he saw a large stone covering a box made of stone (or possibly iron). Using a stick to remove dirt from the edges of the stone cover and prying it up with a lever, Smith saw the plates inside the box, together with other artifacts.

=== Unsuccessful retrieval attempts ===
According to Smith's followers, Smith said he took the plates from the box, put them on the ground, and covered the box with the stone to protect the other treasures that it contained. Nevertheless, the accounts say that when Smith looked back at the ground after closing the box, the plates had once again disappeared into it. When Smith once again raised the stone and attempted to retrieve the plates, he said that he was stricken by a supernatural force that hurled him to the ground as many as three times.

Disconcerted by his inability to obtain the plates, Smith said he briefly wondered whether his experience had been a "dreem of Vision" [sic]. Concluding that it was not, he said he prayed to ask why he had been barred from taking the plates.

In response to his question, Smith said the angel appeared and told him he could not receive the plates because he "had been tempted of the advisary and saught the Plates to obtain riches and kept not the commandments that I should have an eye single to the Glory of God" [sic]. According to Smith's followers, Smith had also broken the angel's commandment "not to lay the plates down, or put them for a moment out of his hands," and according to a nonbeliever, Smith said, "I had forgotten to give thanks to God," as required by the angel.

Smith said the angel instructed him to return the next year, on September 22, 1824, with the "right person": his older brother Alvin. Alvin had died in November 1823, and Smith returned to the hill in 1824 to ask what he should do. Smith said he was told to return the following year (1825) with the "right person" but the angel did not tell Smith who that person might be. However, Smith determined after looking into his seer stone that the "right person" was Emma Hale, his future wife. For the visit on September 22, 1825, Smith may have attempted to bring his treasure-hunting associate Samuel T. Lawrence.

Smith said that he visited the hill "at the end of each year" for four years after the first visit in 1823, but there is no record of him being in the vicinity of Palmyra between January 1826 and January 1827, when he returned to New York from Pennsylvania with his new wife. In January 1827, Smith visited the hill and then told his parents that the angel had severely chastised him for not being "engaged enough in the work of the Lord," which may have meant that he had missed his annual visit to the hill in 1826.

=== Receiving the plates ===
The next annual visit on September 22, 1827, would be, Smith told associates, his last chance to receive the plates. According to Brigham Young, as the scheduled final date to obtain the plates approached, several Palmyra residents expressed concern "that they were going to lose that treasure" and sent for a skilled necromancer from 60 miles (96 km) away, encouraging him to make three separate trips to Palmyra to find the plates. During one of the trips, the unnamed necromancer is said to have discovered the location but was unable to determine the value of the plates. A few days prior to the September 22, 1827, visit to the hill, Smith's loyal treasure-hunting friends Josiah Stowell and Joseph Knight Sr. traveled to Palmyra, in part, to be there during Smith's scheduled visit to the hill.

Another of Smith's former treasure-hunting associates, Samuel T. Lawrence, was also apparently aware of the approaching date to obtain the plates, and Smith was concerned that he might cause trouble. Therefore, on the eve of September 22, 1827, the scheduled date for retrieving the plates, Smith dispatched his father to spy on Lawrence's house until dark. If Lawrence attempted to leave, the elder Smith was to tell him that his son would "thrash the stumps with him" if he found him at the hill. Late at night, Smith took a horse and carriage to the hill Cumorah with Emma. While Emma stayed behind kneeling in prayer, Smith walked to the site of the buried plates. Sometime in the early morning hours, he said that he retrieved the plates and hid them in a hollow log on or near Cumorah. At the same time, Smith said he received a pair of large spectacles he called the Urim and Thummim or "Interpreters," with lenses consisting of two seer stones, which he showed his mother when he returned in the morning.

Over the next few days, Smith took a well-digging job in nearby Macedon to earn enough money to buy a solid lockable chest in which to put the plates. By then, however, some of Smith's treasure-seeking company had heard that Smith had said that he had been successful in obtaining the plates, and they wanted what they believed was their share of the profits from what they viewed as part of a joint venture in treasure hunting. Spying once again on the house of Samuel Lawrence, Smith Sr., determined that a group of ten to twelve of these men, including Lawrence and Willard Chase, had enlisted the talents of a renowned and supposedly talented seer from 60 miles (96 km) away, in an effort to locate where the plates were hidden by means of divination. When Emma heard of that, she rode a stray horse to Macedon and informed Smith, who reportedly determined through his Urim and Thummim that the plates were safe. He nevertheless hurriedly rode home with Emma.

Once home in Manchester, he said he walked to Cumorah, removed the plates from their hiding place, and walked home through the woods and away from the road with the plates wrapped in a linen frock under his arm. On the way, he said a man had sprung up from behind a log and struck him a "heavy blow with a gun.... Knocking the man down with a single punch, Joseph ran as fast as he could for about a half mile before he was attacked by a second man trying to get the plates. After similarly overpowering the man, Joseph continued to run, but before he reached the house, a third man hit him with a gun. In striking the last man, Joseph said, he injured his thumb." He returned home with a dislocated thumb and other minor injuries. Smith sent his father, Joseph Knight, and Josiah Stowell to search for the pursuers, but they found no one.

Smith is said to have put the plates in a locked chest and hid them in his parents' home in Manchester. He refused to allow anyone, including his family, to view the plates or the other artifacts that he said he had in his possession, but some people were allowed to heft them or feel what were said to be the artifacts through a cloth. A few days after retrieving the plates, Smith brought home what he said was an ancient breastplate, which he said had been hidden in the box at Cumorah with the plates. After letting his mother feel through a thin cloth what she said was the breastplate, he placed it in the locked chest.

The Smith home was approached "nearly every night" by villagers hoping to find the chest, where Smith said the plates were kept. After hearing that a group of them would attempt to enter the house by force, Smith buried the chest under the hearth, and the family was able to scare away the intended intruders. Fearing the chest might still be discovered, Smith hid it under the floor boards of his parents' old log home nearby that was then being used as a cooper shop. Later, Smith told his mother he had taken the plates out of the chest, left the empty chest under the floorboards of the cooper shop, and hid the plates in a barrel of flax. Shortly thereafter the empty box was discovered, and the place ransacked by Smith's former treasure-seeking associates, who had enlisted one of the men's sisters to find the hiding place by looking in her seer stone.

=== Translating the plates ===
Smith said that the plates were engraved in an unknown language, and he told associates that he was capable of reading and translating them. The translation took place mainly in Harmony, Pennsylvania (now Oakland Township), Emma's hometown, where Smith and his wife had moved in October 1827 with financial assistance from a prominent, though superstitious, Palmyra landowner Martin Harris. The translation occurred in two phases: the first, from December 1827 to June 1828, during which Smith transcribed some of the characters and then dictated 116 manuscript pages to Harris, which were lost. The second phase began sporadically in early 1829 and then in earnest in April 1829 with the arrival of Oliver Cowdery, a schoolteacher who volunteered to serve as Smith's full-time scribe. In June 1829, Smith and Cowdery moved to Fayette, New York, completing the translation early the following month.

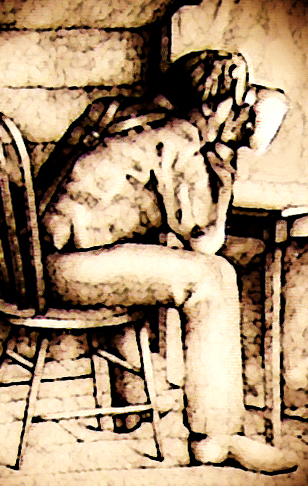
A 21st-century artistic representation of Joseph Smith translating the golden plates by examining a seer stone in his hat

Smith used scribes to write the words he said were a translation of the golden plates, dictating the words while peering into seer stones, which he said allowed him to see the translation. Smith's translation process evolved from his previous use of seer stones in treasure-seeking. During the earliest phase of translation, Smith said he used what he called Urim and Thummim, two stones set in a frame like a set of large spectacles. Witnesses said Smith placed the Urim and Thummim in his hat while he was translating.

After the loss of the first 116 manuscript pages, Smith translated with a single seer stone, which some sources say he had previously used in treasure-seeking. Smith placed the stone in a hat, buried his face in it to eliminate all outside light, and peered into the stone to see the words of the translation. A few times during the translation, a curtain or blanket was raised between Smith and his scribe or between the living area and the area where Smith and his scribe worked. Sometimes, Smith dictated to Harris from upstairs or from a different room.

Smith's translation did not require the use of the plates themselves. Though Smith himself said very little about the translation process, his friends and family said that as he looked into the stone, the written translation of the ancient script appeared to him in English. There are several proposed explanations for how Smith composed his translation. In the 19th century, the most common explanation among anti-Mormons was that he copied the work from a manuscript written by Solomon Spaulding. That theory is repudiated by Smith's preeminent modern biographers. The most prominent modern theory among many ex-Mormons is that Smith composed the translation in response to the provincial opinions of his time, perhaps while in a magical trance-like state. As a matter of faith, Latter Day Saints generally view the translation process as either an automatic process of transcribing text written within the stone or an intuitive translation by Smith, assisted by a mystical connection with God, through the stone. Some Latter Day Saint apologists argue that because of the length of the Book of Mormon (roughly 270,000 words) and the timeframe in which the Book was dictated, it is unlikely that he wrote it or memorized the words from elsewhere. It is also argued that Smith was unfamiliar with the text, often pausing to attempt to pronounce names of people and places that were unfamiliar to him, and therefore it is unlikely that he had read the text before or written it previously.

Smith's dictations were written down by a number of assistants, including Emma Smith, Martin Harris, and Oliver Cowdery. In May 1829, after Smith had lent 116 unduplicated manuscript pages to Harris, and Harris had lost them, Smith dictated a revelation explaining that Smith could not simply retranslate the lost pages because his opponents would attempt to see if he could "bring forth the same words again." According to Grant Palmer, Smith believed "a second transcription would be identical to the first. This confirms the view that the English text existed in some kind of unalterable, spiritual form rather than that someone had to think through difficult conceptual issues and idioms, always resulting in variants in any translation."

=== Location of the plates during translation ===
When Smith and Emma moved to Pennsylvania in October 1827, they transported a wooden box, which Smith said contained the plates, hidden in a barrel of beans. For a time, the couple stayed in the home of Emma's father, Isaac Hale, but when Smith refused to show Hale the plates, Hale banished the concealed objects from his house. Afterward, Smith told several of his associates that the plates were hidden in the nearby woods. Emma said that she remembered the plates being on a table in the house, wrapped in a linen tablecloth, which she moved from time to time when it got in the way of her chores. According to Smith's mother, the plates were also stored in a trunk on Emma's bureau. However, Smith did not require the physical presence of the plates to translate them.

In April 1828, Martin Harris's wife, Lucy, visited Harmony with her husband and demanded to see the plates. When Smith refused to show them to her, she searched the house, grounds, and woods. According to Smith's mother, during the search Lucy was frightened by a large, black snake and so was prevented from digging up the plates. As a result of Martin Harris's loss of the 116 pages of manuscript, Smith said that between July and September 1828, the angel Moroni took back both the plates and the Urim and Thummim as a penalty for his having delivered "the manuscript into the hands of a wicked man." According to Smith's mother, the angel returned the objects to Smith on September 22, 1828, the anniversary of the day that he first received them.

In March 1829, Martin Harris visited Harmony and asked to see the plates. Smith told him that he "would go into the woods where the Book of Plates was, and that after he came back, Harris should follow his tracks in the snow, and find the Book, and examine it for himself." Harris followed the directions but could not find the plates.

In early June 1829, the unwanted attentions of locals around Harmony necessitated Smith's move to the home of David Whitmer and his parents in Fayette, New York. Smith said that during this move the plates were transported by the angel Moroni, who put them in the garden of the Whitmer house, where Smith could recover them. The translation was completed at the Whitmer home.

=== Returning the plates ===
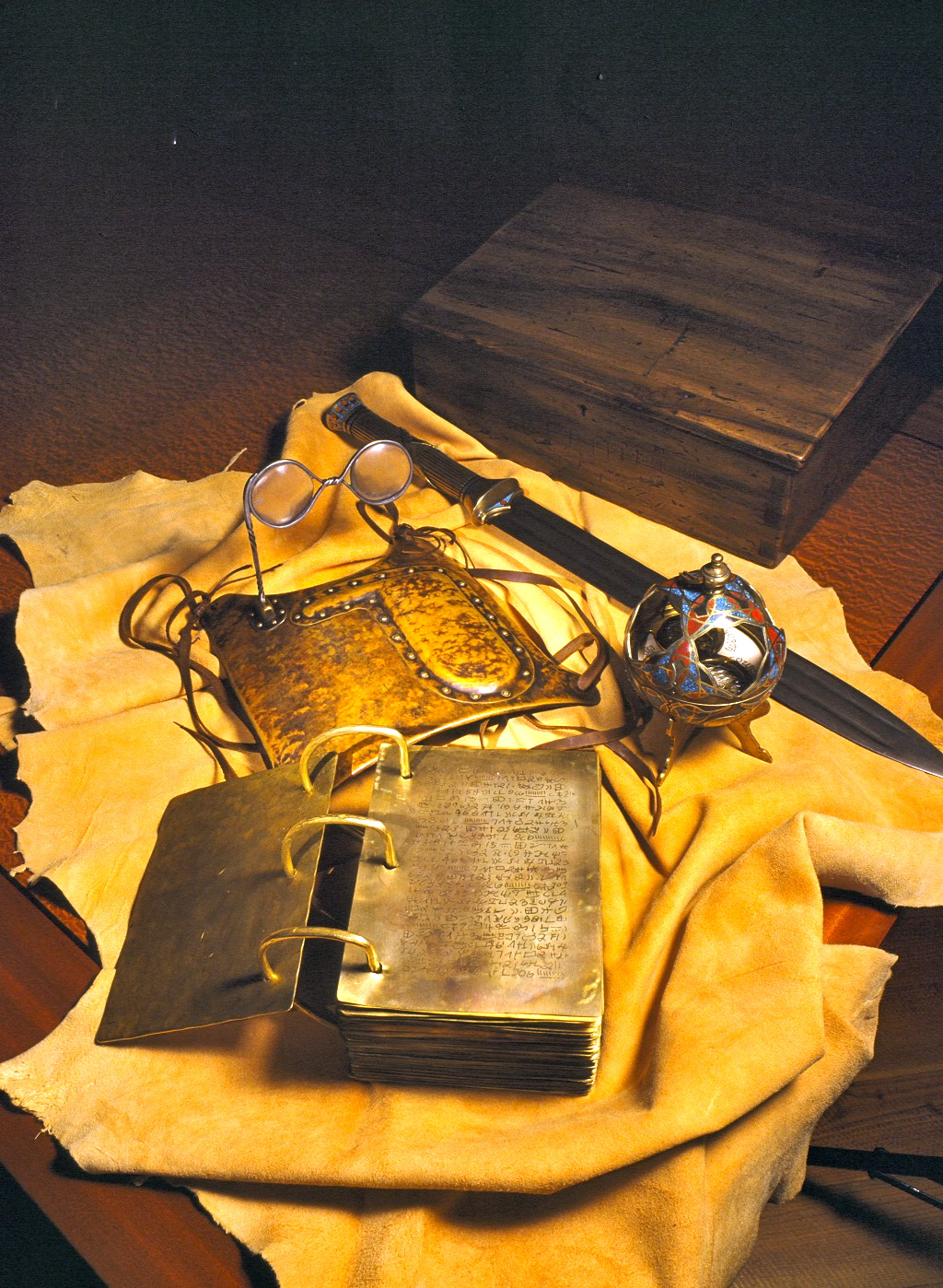
A 21st-century artistic representation of the Golden plates, Urim and Thummim, Sword of Laban, and Liahona

After translation was complete, Smith said he returned the plates to the angel, but he did not elaborate about this experience. According to accounts by several early Mormons, a group of Mormon leaders, including Oliver Cowdery, David Whitmer, and possibly others accompanied Smith and returned the plates to a cave inside the Hill Cumorah. There, Smith is said to have placed the plates on a table near "many wagon loads" of other ancient records, and the Sword of Laban hanging on the cave wall.

Smith taught that part of the golden plates were "sealed." The "sealed" portion is said to contain "a revelation from God, from the beginning of the world to the ending thereof." Many Latter Day Saints believe that the plates will be kept hidden until a future time, when the sealed part will be translated and, according to one early Mormon leader, transferred from the hill to one of the Mormon temples.

David Whitmer is quoted as stating that he saw just the untranslated portion of the plates sitting on the table with the sword (and also a breastplate). Apparently, Whitmer was aware of expeditions at Cumorah to locate the sealed portion of the plates through "science and mineral rods."

== Descriptions of the plates ==
Smith said the angel Moroni had commanded him not to show the plates to any unauthorized person. However, Smith eventually obtained the written statement of several witnesses who saw the plates. It is unclear whether the witnesses believed they had seen the plates with their physical eyes or had seen them in a vision. For instance, although Martin Harris continued to testify to the truth of the Book of Mormon even when he was estranged from the church, at least during the early years of the movement, he "seems to have repeatedly admitted the internal, subjective nature of his visionary experience."

According to some sources, Smith initially intended that the first authorized witness be his firstborn son; but this child was stillborn in 1828. In March 1829, Martin Harris came to Harmony to see the plates, but was unable to find them in the woods where Smith said they could be found. The next day, Smith dictated a revelation stating that Harris could eventually qualify himself to be one of three witnesses with the exclusive right to "view [the plates] as they are".

By June 1829, Smith determined that there would be eight additional witnesses, a total of twelve including Smith. During the second half of June 1829, Smith took Harris, Oliver Cowdery and David Whitmer (known collectively as the Three Witnesses) into woods in Fayette, New York, where they said they saw an angel holding the golden plates and turning the leaves. The four also said they heard "the voice of the Lord" telling them that the translation of the plates was correct, and commanding them to testify of what they saw and heard. A few days later, Smith took a different group of Eight Witnesses to a location near Smith's parents' home in Palmyra where they said Smith showed them the golden plates. Statements over the names of these men, apparently drafted by Smith, were published in 1830 as an appendix to the Book of Mormon. According to later statements ascribed to Martin Harris, he viewed the plates in a vision and not with his "natural eyes."

In addition to Smith and the other eleven who claimed to be witnesses, a few other early Mormons said they saw the plates. For instance, Smith's mother Lucy Mack Smith said she had "seen and handled" the plates. Smith's wife Emma and his younger brother William and younger sister Katharine also said they had examined and lifted the plates while they were wrapped in fabric. Others said they had visions of the plates or had been shown the plates by an angel, in some cases years after Smith said he had returned the plates.

=== Described format, binding, and dimensions ===
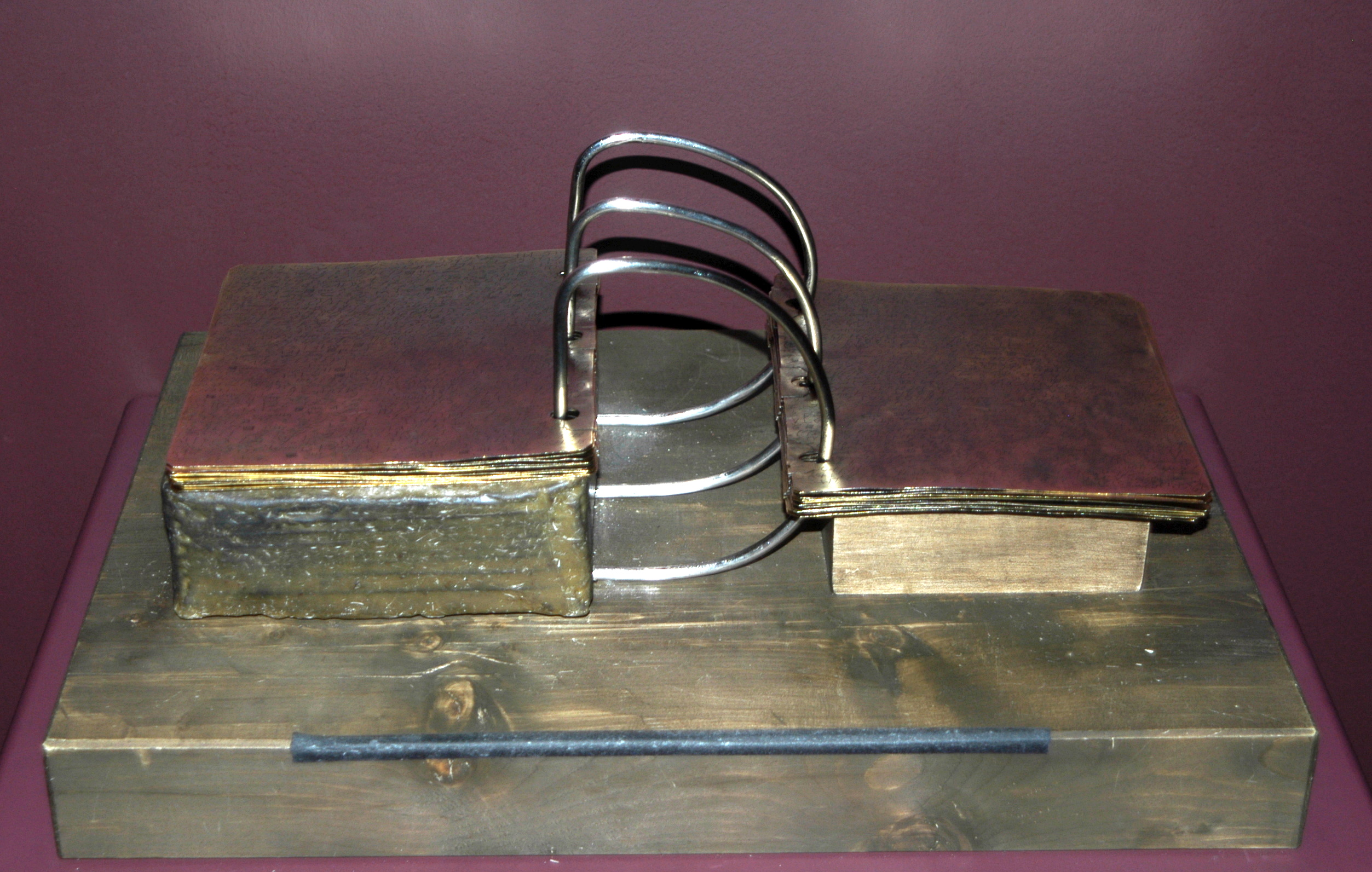
Full-scale model of the golden plates based on Joseph Smith's description

The plates were said to be bound at one edge by a set of rings. In 1828, Martin Harris, is reported to have said that the plates were "fastened together in the shape of a book by wires". In 1859 Harris said that the plates "were seven inches [18 cm] wide by eight inches [20 cm] in length, and were of the thickness of plates of tin; and when piled one above the other, they were altogether about four inches [10 cm] thick; and they were put together on the back by three silver rings, so that they would open like a book". David Whitmer, another of the Three Witnesses, was quoted by an 1831 Palmyra newspaper as having said the plates were "the thickness of tin plate; the back was secured with three small rings ... passing through each leaf in succession". Anomalously, Smith's father is quoted as saying that the plates were only half an inch (1.27 centimeter) thick. Smith's mother, who said she had "seen and handled" the plates, is quoted as saying they were "eight inches [20 cm] long, and six [15 cm] wide ... all connected by a ring which passes through a hole at the end of each plate".

Hyrum Smith and John Whitmer, also witnesses in 1829, are reported to have stated that the rings holding the plates together were, in Hyrum's words, "in the shape of the letter D, which facilitated the opening and shutting of the book". Smith's wife Emma and his younger brother William said they had examined the plates while wrapped in fabric. Emma said she "felt of the plates, as they thus lay on the table, tracing their outline and shape. They seemed to be pliable like thick paper, and would rustle with a metallic sound when the edges were moved by the thumb, as one does sometimes thumb the edges of a book". William agreed that the plates could be rustled with one's thumb like the pages of a book.

Smith did not provide his own published description of the plates until 1842, when he said in a letter that "each plate was six inches [15 cm] wide and eight inches [20 cm] long, and not quite so thick as common tin. They were ... bound together in a volume, as the leaves of a book, with three rings running through the whole. The volume was something near six inches [15 cm] in thickness".

=== Described composition and weight ===
The plates were first described as "gold", and beginning about 1827, the plates were widely called the "gold bible". When the Book of Mormon was published in 1830, the Eight Witnesses described the plates as having "the appearance of gold". The Book of Mormon describes the plates as being made of "ore". In a June 1830 court hearing, Josiah Stowell testified that he inadvertently caught a glimpse of a corner of the plates (making him "the only witness to see the plates 'by accident,'") and said it "resembled a stone of a greenish caste." In 1831, a Palmyra newspaper quoted David Whitmer, one of the Three Witnesses, as having said that the plates were a "whitish yellow color", with "three small rings of the same metal".

Smith's first published description of the plates said that the plates "had the appearance of gold", and Smith said that Moroni had referred to the plates as "gold." Late in life, Martin Harris stated that the rings holding the plates together were made of silver, and he said the plates themselves, based on their heft of "forty or fifty pounds" (18–23 kg), "were lead or gold". Joseph's brother William, who said he felt the plates inside a pillow case in 1827, said in 1884 that he understood the plates to be "a mixture of gold and copper ... much heavier than stone, and very much heavier than wood".

Different people estimated the weight of the plates differently. According to Smith's one-time-friend Willard Chase, Smith told him in 1827 that the plates weighed between 40 and 60 pounds (18–27 kg), most likely the latter. Smith's father Joseph Smith Sr., who was one of the Eight Witnesses, reportedly weighed them and said in 1830 that they "weighed thirty pounds" (14 kg). Smith's brother William, who had lifted the plates, thought they "weighed about sixty pounds [27 kg] according to the best of my judgment". Others who lifted the plates while they were wrapped in cloth or enclosed in a box thought that they weighed about 60 pounds [27 kg]. Martin Harris said that he had "hefted the plates many times, and should think they weighed forty or fifty pounds [18–23 kg]". Smith's wife Emma never estimated the weight of the plates but said they were light enough for her to "move them from place to place on the table, as it was necessary in doing my work".

From descriptions of the plates' dimensions, had the plates been made of 24-karat gold (which Smith never claimed), they would have weighed about 140 pounds (64 kg). Based on the plates' lighter weight and Stowell's description of its corner's "greenish cast", one scholar has hypothesized Smith made the plates from copper, which weighs less than gold and rusts green. LDS writers have speculated the plates could also exhibit those qualities if it were made of a copper-gold alloy like Mesoamerican tumbaga.

=== "Sealed" portion ===
According to Smith and others, the golden plates contained a "sealed" portion containing "a revelation from God, from the beginning of the world to the ending thereof." Smith never described the nature of the seal, and the language of the Book of Mormon may be interpreted to describe a sealing that was spiritual, metaphorical, physical, or a combination of these elements.

The Book of Mormon refers to other documents and plates as being "sealed" to be revealed at some future time. For example, the Book of Mormon says the entire set of plates was "sealed up, and hid up unto the Lord" and that separate records of John the Apostle were "sealed up to come forth in their purity" in the end times. One set of plates to which the Book of Mormon refers was "sealed up" in the sense that they were written in a language that could not be read.

Smith may have understood the sealing to be a supernatural or spiritual sealing "by the power of God" (2 Nephi 27:10), an idea supported by a reference in the Book of Mormon to the "interpreters" with which Smith said they were buried or "sealed." Oliver Cowdery also stated that when Smith visited the hill, he was stricken by a supernatural force because the plates were "sealed by the prayer of faith."

Several witnesses described a physical sealing placed on part of the plates by Mormon or Moroni. David Whitmer said that when an angel showed him the plates in 1829, "a large portion of the leaves were so securely bound together that it was impossible to separate them," that the "sealed" part of the plates were held together as a solid mass "stationary and immovable," "as solid to my view as wood," and that there were "perceptible marks where the plates appeared to be sealed" with leaves "so securely bound that it was impossible to separate them." In 1842, Lucy Mack Smith said that some of the plates were "sealed together" while others were "loose." The account of the Eight Witnesses says they saw the plates in 1829 and handled "as many of the leaves as Smith has translated," implying that they did not examine untranslated parts, such as the sealed portion. In one interview, David Whitmer said that "about half" the book was unsealed; in 1881, he said "about one-third" was unsealed. Whitmer's 1881 statement is consistent with an 1856 statement by Orson Pratt, an associate of Smith's who never saw the plates himself but who had spoken with witnesses, that "about two-thirds" of the plates were "sealed up".

=== Engravings ===
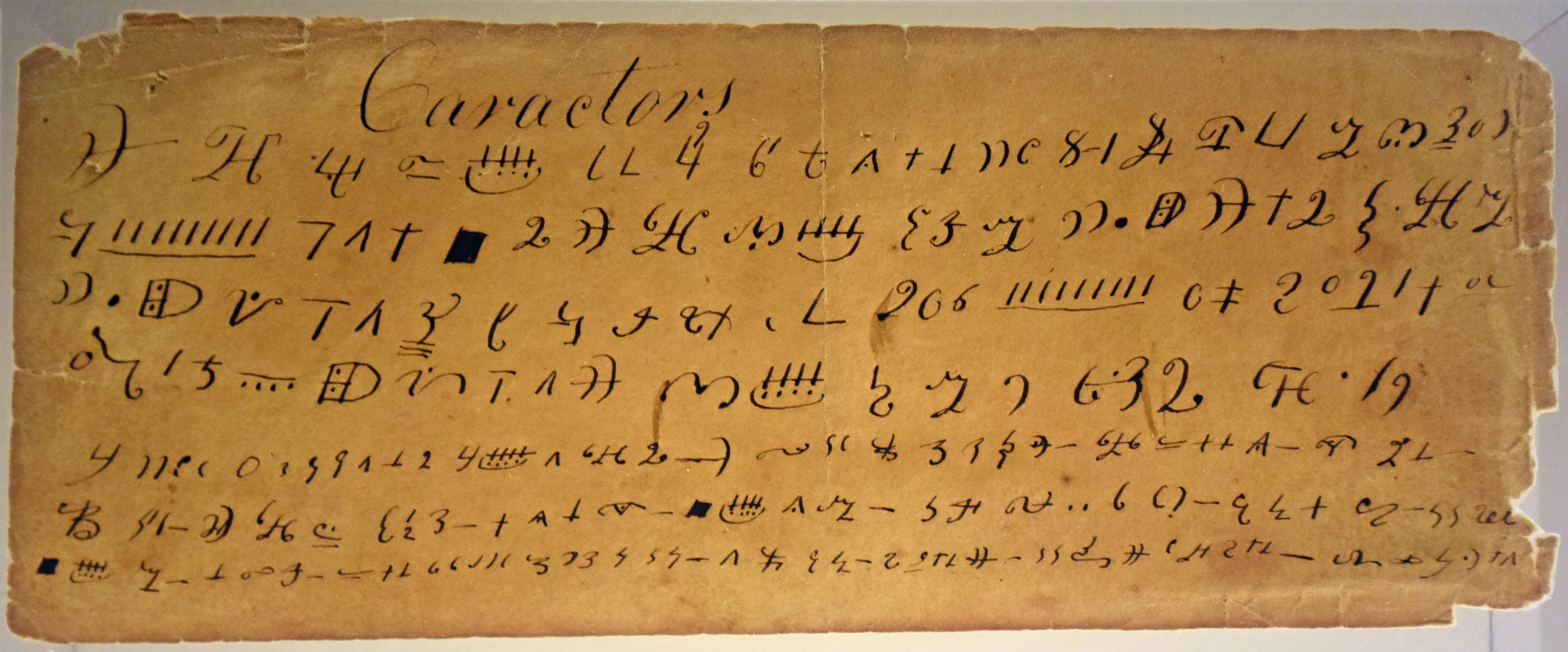
Reformed Egyptian characters in John Whitmer's handwriting

== Significance in the Latter Day Saint tradition ==
The golden plates are the reputed source for the Book of Mormon, which Smith called the "most correct of any book on earth, and the keystone of our religion." However, the golden plates are just one of many known and reputed metal plates with significance in the Latter Day Saint movement. The Book of Mormon itself refers to a long tradition of writing historical records on plates, of which the golden plates are a culmination (see List of plates (Latter Day Saint movement)).

Some Latter Day Saints, especially those within the Community of Christ, have doubted the historicity of the golden plates and downplayed their significance. For most adherents of the Latter Day Saint faith, however, the physical existence and authenticity of the golden plates are essential elements of their faith. For them, the message of the Book of Mormon is inseparable from the story of its origins.

Hugh Nibley, a Latter-day Saint scholar, said in 1957 that he believed even proof of the actual existence of the golden plates would not settle disputes about the Book of Mormon and the story of its origin.

=== Kinderhook plates hoax ===
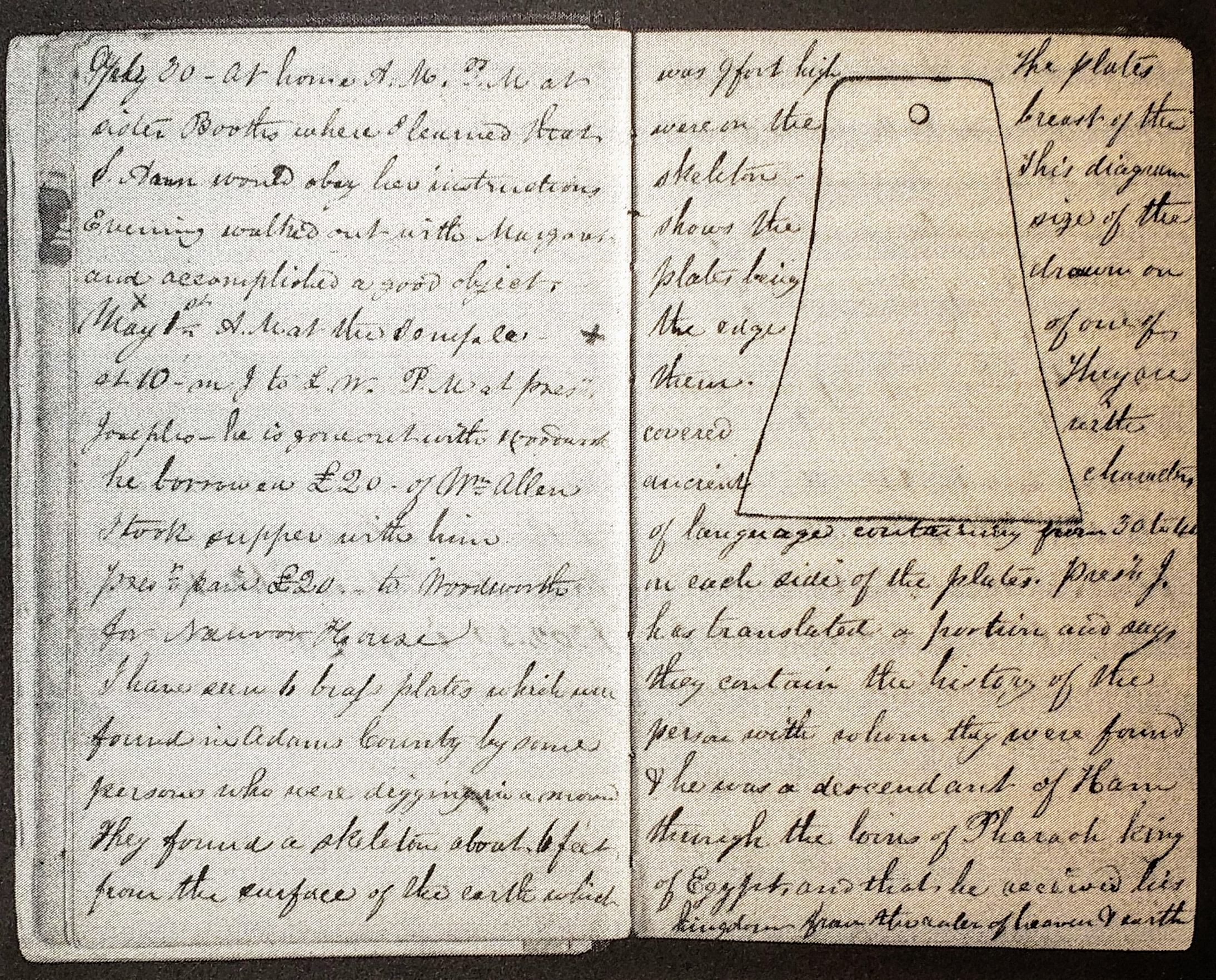
Page from William Clayton Diary, with tracing of a Kinderhook plate alongside Smith's translation

A few other sets of plates have arisen to prominence in various denominations of the Latter Day Saint movement.

In 1843, after reading a missionary tract written by Orson Pratt, three men in Kinderhook, Pike County, Illinois – Robert Wiley, Wilburn Fugate, and Bridge Whitton – decided to collaborate to counterfeit a set of metal plates and "startle the natives," as one of Fugate's sons recalled. The trio forged plates from copper, etched them with acid, and buried them in a mound, digging them up on April 23, 1843, in a pretended discovery. The Quincy Whig published a story on the discovery, and the Times and Seasons and Nauvoo Neighbor, a publication of the church and of the city respectively, reprinted the story. The Mormon community soon expressed much interest in the plates.

By May 1, the plates had been brought to Nauvoo, and Smith, apparently believing they were authentic, attempted to translate them. Smith's private secretary William Clayton recorded that upon receiving the plates, Smith sent for his "Hebrew Bible & Lexicon", suggesting that rather than translate the plates by direct revelation, Smith attempted to translate the plates by more conventional means. That day, Clayton wrote in his journal:

I have seen 6 brass plates ... covered with ancient characters of language containing from 30 to 40 on each side of the plates. Prest J. [Joseph Smith] has translated a portion and says they contain the history of the person with whom they were found and he was a descendant of Ham through the loins of Pharaoh king of Egypt, and that he received his kingdom from the ruler of heaven and earth.

Scholars examining the Kinderhook plates in retrospect have found that one character coincidentally resembles a character in Smith's Egyptian Alphabet Book, the alleged meaning of which matches Smith's attempted translation of the Kinderhook plates, further suggesting Smith tried to translate the plates as an amateur linguist.

Apostles John Taylor and Wilford Woodruff, editors of the Nauvoo Neighbor, anticipated Smith would translate the plates in their entirety and promised in a June 1843 article that "The contents of the plates, together with a Fac-simile of the same, will be published in the 'Times and Seasons,' as soon as the translation is completed." However, the plates were returned untranslated to Wiley and Fugate in Kinderhook. Smith did not express reservations about the plates to any of his compatriots, but whether or not he recognized the Kinderhook plates as fraudulent, "he did not swing into a full-fledged translation" as he had with his earlier encounter with Egyptian scrolls.

In 1886, a signed letter from Fugate was published in the book Joseph Smith the Prophet, His Family and His Friends: A Study Based on Facts and Documents, and in the letter Fugate revealed the hoax and the fabrication of the plates. Nevertheless, many members of the Church of Jesus Christ of Latter-day Saints (a denomination of Mormons who followed Brigham Young after Smith's death) refused to accept Fugate's confession and defended the Kinderhook plates as authentic and Smith's translation as legitimate until 1980, when Northwestern University materials science professor D. Lynn Johnson examined a plate still held by the Chicago Historical Society and conclusively proved it was a nineteenth-century creation.

=== Strangite plates ===
Two other sets of alleged plates, the Voree plates and the Book of the Law of the Lord, were translated by James Strang – one of three major contenders to succeed Smith – who went on to lead the Church of Jesus Christ of Latter Day Saints (Strangite). The Voree plates were alleged to have been written by an ancient inhabitant of what is now Burlington, Wisconsin, while the Book of the Law of the Lord was alleged by Strang to be a translation of the Plates of Laban mentioned in the Book of Mormon. Neither of these alleged discoveries by Strang is accepted as authentic outside of the Strangite community.

== Mainstream views ==
Mainstream scholarship regards the Book of Mormon as an ahistorical 19th-century creation and rejects Smith's claim to have possessed golden plates.

=== Visionary witnesses ===
Smith and his peers were practitioners of folk magic, including scrying, second sight, and divination. Joseph Smith reportedly guided local seer Samuel T. Lawrence to the hill, where the two used a seer stone to view the golden plates; Lawrence reportedly was the first to see a pair of spectacles in addition to the plates.

Oliver Cowdrey, one of the Three Witnesses, was a distant relative of Joseph Smith who also engaged in divination. Cowdery reported that his first witness of the golden plates was in a vision before he and Smith had ever met. In 1838, Cowdrey broke with Smith, accusing him of a "dirty, nasty, filthy affair" with Fanny Alger. David Whitmer, a friend of Cowdery, similarly reported visions and owned a seer stone.

Martin Harris, one of the Three Witnesses to the golden plates, described his witness as a visionary experience. John Gilbert, printer of the first edition of the Book of Mormon, recalled asking Harris if he saw the plates with his naked eyes, to which Harries replied "No, I saw them with a spiritual eye".

In 1837, Harris and others accused the Kirtland Safety Society bank of fraud. In December 1837, Smith and the Kirtland High Council excommunicated 28 individuals, Harris among them. In 1838, Smith called the Three Witnesses (Cowdery, Harris, and Whitmer) "too mean to mention; and we had liked to have forgotten them." Parrish's church in Kirtland took control of the temple and became known as The Church of Christ. In 1838, Harris publicly admitted that "he never saw the plates with his natural eyes, only in vision or imagination." Harris publicly denied that any of the Witnesses to the Book of Mormon had ever seen or handled the golden plates. Harris's statement reportedly induced five influential members, including three apostles, to leave the church. In the 1870s, Harris again gave an interview where he admitted "I never saw the golden plates, only in a visionary or entranced state."

=== Sham plates hypothesis ===
Multiple witnesses reported touching a set of plates covered in cloth. Scholar Dan Vogel has argued that Smith may have constructed a set of plates, out of tin or similar metal, that could be hefted but could not pass visual inspection. In 2021, John Dehlin's Mormon Stories Podcast documented the creation of a set of tin plates using 19th-century tools in two hours.
