= Josiah Stowell =

Josiah Stowell Sr. (also spelled Stoal; 1770–1844) was an associate of Joseph Smith, the founder of the Mormon movement. Stowell hired Smith as a seer in 1825, testified on his behalf in two separate criminal proceedings, and joined Smith's newly established church in 1830.

== Early life ==
Josiah was born on March 22, 1770, in Winchester, Cheshire County, New Hampshire, to Israel Stowell (1732–1801) and Mary Butler (1736–1777). In 1791, he moved to Jericho (later renamed Bainbridge), New York, and married Miriam Bridgeman. The couple had eight children, with their youngest named Josiah Jr.

== Association with Joseph Smith and early Mormonism ==
In October 1825, Stowell traveled to visit his eldest son in Palmyra. He hired Joseph Smith Jr. to act as a seer to locate a lost Spanish silver mine that was believed to exist in Harmony, Pennsylvania. Joseph Sr. and his son traveled to Harmony. In 1826, after Stowell's nephew Peter Bridgeman filed a complaint against Smith, Stowell testified on Smith's behalf at his trial for being a disorderly person.

Smith later recalled that he was still in Stowell's employ on January 18, 1827, when he married Emma. Stowell was visiting the Smiths in September 1827 when Joseph first returned with the Golden Plates. In 1830, Stowell once again testified on Smith's behalf during another criminal proceeding. That same year, Stowell was baptized into Smith's church. Smith later dictated a revelation that Stowell, Oliver Cowdery, Hiram Page, and Joseph Knight Sr. would sell the copyright of the Book of Mormon in Canada, but they failed to do so, leading Smith to suggest that "Some revelations are of God, some revelations are of man, and some revelations are of the devil."

== Later life ==
In 1833, Stowell moved to Smithboro, New York. In 1843, Stowell and his son wrote a letter vouching for Smith's character. He died in Smithboro in 1844.
