= Criticism of the Book of Mormon =

Subjects of criticism of the Book of Mormon include its origins, authenticity, and historicity, which have been subject to considerable criticism from scholars and skeptics since it was first published in 1830. The Book of Mormon is a sacred text of the Latter Day Saint movement, which adherents believe contains writings of ancient prophets who lived on the American continent from approximately 2200 BC to AD 421. It was first published in March 1830 by Joseph Smith as The Book of Mormon: An Account Written by the Hand of Mormon upon Plates Taken from the Plates of Nephi, who said that it had been written in otherwise unknown characters referred to as "reformed Egyptian" engraved on golden plates. Contemporary followers of the Latter Day Saint movement typically regard the text primarily as scripture, but also as a historical record of God's dealings with the ancient inhabitants of the Americas.

Mainstream scholarship concludes the Book of Mormon is not of ancient origin. The book is considered a creation by Smith and possibly one or more others, drawing on material and ideas from the contemporary 19th-century environment rather than translating an ancient record. Many scholars point to the fact that no evidence of a reformed Egyptian language has ever been discovered. The content found within the book has also been questioned. Scholars have pointed out a number of anachronisms within the text, and general archaeological or genetic evidence has not supported the book's statements about the indigenous peoples of the Americas. The text has also undergone many revisions with some significant changes, which critics argue have notably altered its meaning, and see as a rebuttal of its divine origins.

Despite the many scholarly challenges to its authenticity, adherents and many Latter Day Saint scholars have repeatedly defended the book. The oldest, and most significant, defense of Smith's account of its origins comes from the accounts of eleven men in two groups, who claimed to have seen and handled the golden plates which the Book of Mormon was written on; they are known as the Three Witnesses and the Eight Witnesses. More contemporary adherents have also sought to rebut critical viewpoints and provide general defenses of the book. A few Latter Day Saint scholars have also proposed archaeological findings which they say give credence to the book, although mainstream scholars disagree.

== Background ==
The evidence indicates that the Book of Mormon is in fact an amalgamation of ideas that were inspired by Joseph's own environment (new) and themes from the Bible (old).

— Grant H. Palmer

Scholars reject Joseph Smith's explanation of the origin of the Book of Mormon. Smith said that the text contained within the Book of Mormon was derived from an ancient Native American record written on golden plates, and that God gave him and a few others the power to translate it into English. Critics note that there has never been any physical proof of the existence of the golden plates; Smith said that the angel Moroni, who appeared to him and instructed him on how to recover the plates from where they were buried, reclaimed the plates once Smith had completed the translation. To provide support towards the existence of the plates, Smith included two statements in the Book of Mormon saying that several witnesses had been shown the plates, and their testimony is typically published at the beginning of the Book of Mormon. While none of these men ever retracted their statements, critics nevertheless discount these testimonies for varying reasons, one of which is because most of these men were closely interrelated. In later years Martin Harris, one of the witnesses, is recorded to have confessed that he saw the plates with a "spiritual eye" or "eye of faith".

Non-Mormon linguists, archaeologists, and historians do not regard the Book of Mormon to be of ancient origin. In 1834, a publication by Eber D. Howe claimed that Smith had plagiarized an unpublished manuscript written by Solomon Spalding. Some skeptics today conclude that Smith composed the book himself, possibly with the help of Oliver Cowdery and Sidney Rigdon, drawing from information and publications available in his time, including the King James Bible, The Wonders of Nature, and View of the Hebrews.

== Text and language ==
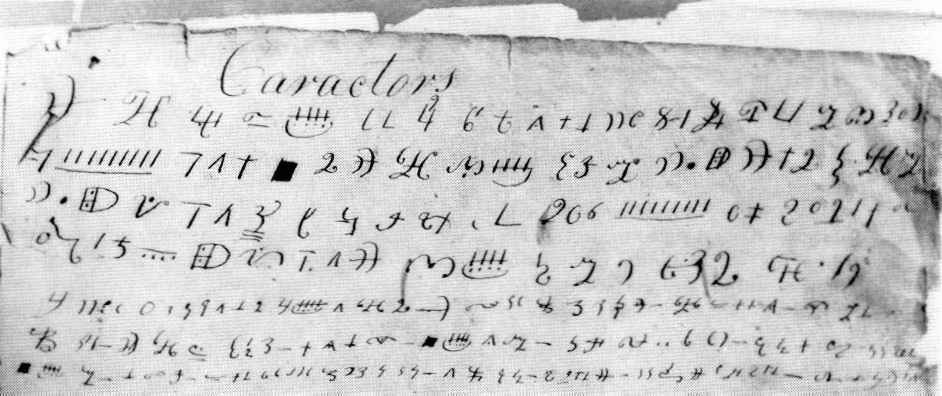
Joseph Smith provided a sample of "reformed Egyptian" characters. Egyptologists have described this language as Smith's native tongue.

Joseph Smith said he translated the Book of Mormon from a language called reformed Egyptian. Archaeologists and Egyptologists have found no evidence that this language ever existed. However, Mormon apologist Hugh Nibley has proposed that reformed Egyptian is the same or similar to the Meroitic language, a known ancient Egyptian dialect. (Note: Nibley's correlations have been criticized as examples of Parallelomania, which is defined as the "over use or improper use of parallels in the exposition of a text.")

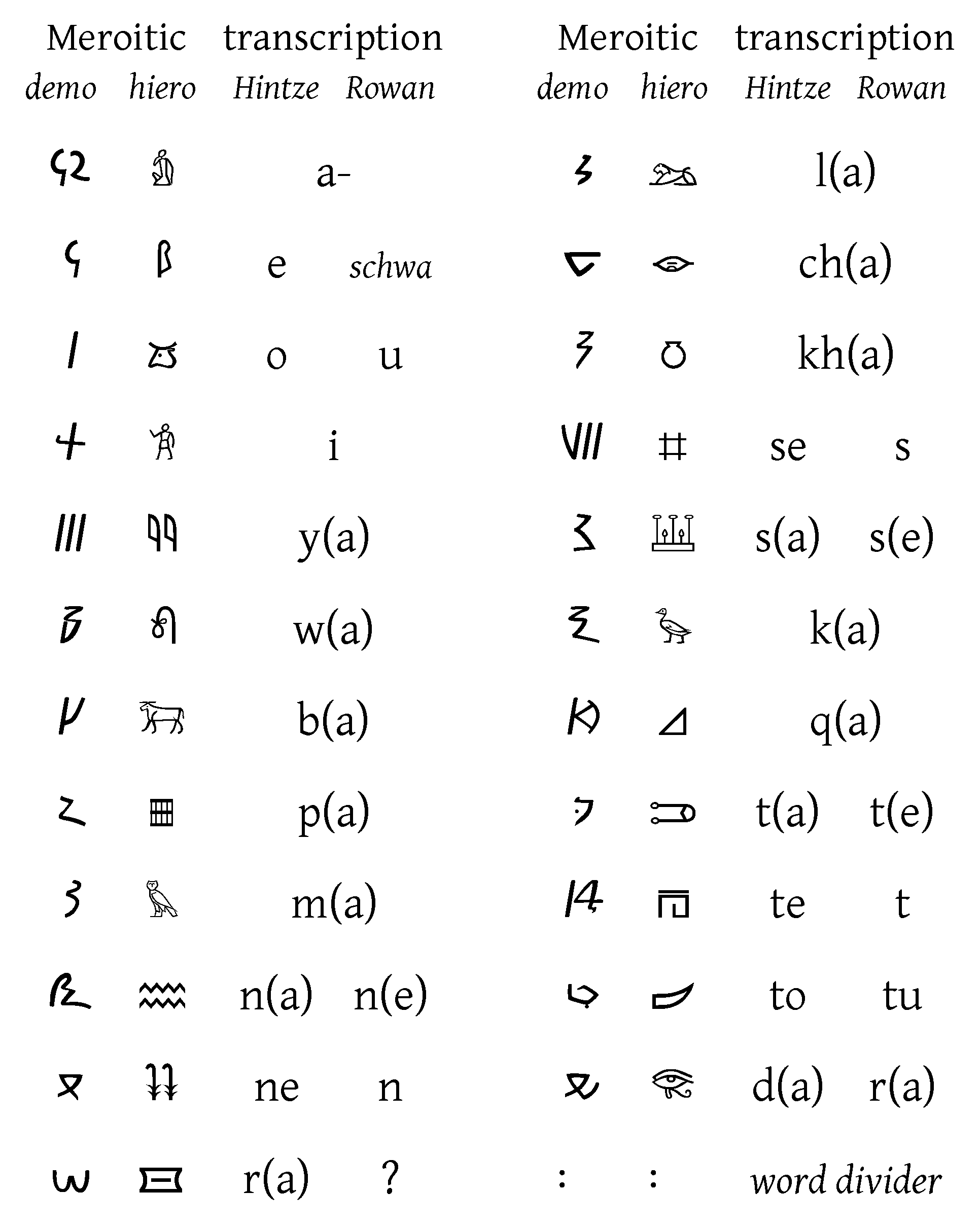
The Meroitic alphabet

Furthermore, official LDS Church commentary on the Book of Mormon says that at least some ancestors of Native Americans came from the Jerusalem area; however, Native American linguistic specialists have not found any Native American language that appears to be related to languages of the ancient Near East.

Grant H. Palmer suggested that Smith borrowed the name "Cumorah" through his study of the treasure-hunting stories of Captain William Kidd, based on the similarity of the names from Smith's account—Moroni and Cumorah—to the location Moroni, Comoros, related to Kidd's hunt for treasure. (Smith was known as a treasure-hunter long before he said he found the golden plates.)

=== Contemporary parallels ===
Early critic of Mormonism and contemporary of Joseph Smith, Reverend Alexander Campbell noted the Book of Mormon contains many theological answers to hotly debated questions in 19th century America:

This prophet Smith, through his stone spectacles, wrote on the plates of Nephi, in his book of Mormon, every error and almost every truth discussed in N. York for the last ten years. He decides all the great controversies – infant baptism, ordination, the trinity, regeneration, repentance, justification, the fall of man, the atonement, transubstantiation, fasting, penance, church government, religious experience, the call to the ministry, the general resurrection, eternal punishment, who may baptize, and even the question of freemasonry, republican government, and the rights of man. All these topics are repeatedly alluded to. How much more benevolent and intelligent this American Apostle, than were the holy twelve, and Paul to assist them!!! He prophesied of all these topics, and of the apostacy, and infallibly decided, by his authority, every question. How easy to prophecy of the past or of the present time!!

Campbell argued that the presence of these topics represented a contemporary author rather than multiple authors writing in antiquity. Grant H. Palmer, too, argued that "the Book of Mormon reflects a keen awareness of evangelical Protestantism and the Bible," noting similarities in language and themes with the 19th century.

=== Translation ===
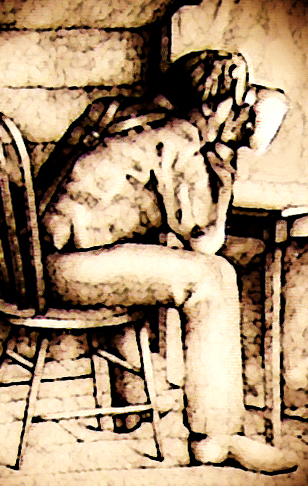
A depiction of Joseph Smith dictating the Book of Mormon by peering at a seer stone in a hat

The only statement Joseph Smith ever made about the translation process was "through the medium of the urim and thummim I translated the record, by the gift and power of God." Martin Harris, Smith's second scribe, and David Whitmer, who witnessed Smith dictating the translation of the plates to Oliver Cowdery, both describe the process as an exact word-for-word translation.

Modern LDS scholars tend to fall into two schools regarding the nature of the translation process: tight control and loose control. Those who believe in the tight control interpretation argue that Smith had very little leeway in the words used in dictating the Book of Mormon, but was not restricted to an exact word-for-word translation. Those who believe in the loose control interpretation argue that "'ideas were revealed to Joseph Smith' and he put them 'into his own language.'"

Some critics, such as Alexander Campbell, have argued that the voice and tone of the Book of Mormon are unchanging rather than reflective of a translation by multiple authors over a thousand-year time span.

Although scholars could not analyze the Golden Plates to evaluate the accuracy of Smith's translation, parts of the Egyptian papyrus Joseph Smith used to translate the Book of Abraham have survived. Egyptologists rejected Smith's translation and recognized that the Book of Abraham papyrus was nothing more than "ordinary funeral documents such as can be found on thousands of Egyptian graves." Palmer uses this discrepancy as part of his ultimate conclusion that "there is no evidence that [Smith] ever translated a document as we would understand that phrase."

=== Textual revisions ===
Critics also challenge the Book of Mormon's divine origin by noting the numerous revisions to the text. Though most changes are small spelling and grammar corrections, critics claim that even these are significant in light of Smith's claims of divine inspiration. Smith claimed that the Book of Mormon was "the most correct of any book on earth," and Martin Harris said that the words which appeared on the seer stone would not disappear until they were correctly written; critics assert that some of these changes were systematic attempts to hide the book's flaws.

=== Biblical language ===
The Book of Mormon claims to be the original writings of Nephite leaders in ancient America, yet it contains a mix of verbatim and paraphrased quotations of the 17th-century edition of the King James Bible (KJV) and the deuterocanonical books, which Joseph Smith's bible had as well. Furthermore, the language of the Book of Mormon closely mimics the Elizabethan English of the KJV, with 19th-century English mixed in.

The Book of Mormon quotes 25,000 words from the KJV Old Testament (e.g., 2 Nephi 30:13-15; cf. Isaiah 11:7-9) and over 2,000 words from the KJV New Testament.

There are numerous cases where the Nephite writers mimic wording from the New Testament, a document to which they would have had no access. Below are five examples out of a list of 400 examples created by Jerald and Sandra Tanner:

Book of Mormon Text	KJV Text
"the kingdom of God, which was prepared for them from the foundation of the world (2 Nephi 9:18)	"the kingdom prepared for you from the foundation of the world (Matthew 25:34)
"he judgeth, and his judgment is just" (Mosiah 3:18)	"I judge: and my judgment is just" (John 5:30)
"he who is filthy shall remain in his filthiness" (Alma 7:21)	"he which is filthy, let him be filthy still" (Revelation 22:11)
"that one man should perish than that a nation should ... perish in unbelief (1 Nephi 4:13)	"that one man should die for the people, and that the whole nation perish not" (John 11:50)
"the dog to his vomit, or like the sow to her wallowing in the mire" (3 Nephi 7:8)	"the dog is turned to his own vomit again; and the sow that was washed to her wallowing in the mire (2 Peter 2:22)

Here are some parallels with the Deuterocanonical Books and the Book of Mormon. In particular, 2 Maccabees includes the name "Nephi". Examples of purported parallels include:

Book of Mormon Text	Deuterocanonical Text
"I had made an abridgement from the plates of Nephi ... And I cannot write a hundredth part of the things of my people." (Words of Mormon 1:3,5)	"All these things, I say, being declared by Jason of Cyrene in five books, we will assay to abridge in one volume." (2 Maccabees 2:23)
"And I commanded him ... that he should go with me into the treasury ... I also spake unto him that I should carry the engravings, which were upon the plates of brass" (1 Nephi 4:20,24)	"They commanded that this writing should be put in tables of brass, and that they should be set ... in a conspicuous place; Also that the copies thereof should be laid up in the treasury" (1 Maccabees 14:48-49)
"And my people would that we should call the name of the place Nephi; wherefore we did call it Nephi". (2 Nephi 5:8)	"Then the king, in closing the place, made it holy ... many men call it Nephi". (2 Maccabees 1:34,36)
"And it came to pass ... Behold, I have dreamed a dream" (1 Nephi 8:2)	"And it came to pass ... I dreamed a dream by night" (2 Esdras 13:1)

=== Names ===
Critics believe Joseph Smith came up with all the names in the Book of Mormon, noting that Joseph owned a King James Bible with a table listing all the names used in the Bible. Many Book of Mormon names are either biblical, formed from a rhyming pattern, or changed by a prefix or suffix. Furthermore, Jaredites and Nephites shared names despite the Jaredites being of a different place and language than the Nephites; one possible explanation for the cross-pollination is that the Nephites incorporated the people of Zarahemla into their polity, which is said to have briefly co-existed in time and place with the Jaredites.

=== Views toward women ===
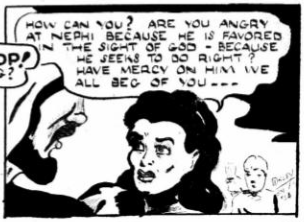
An unnamed woman in the Book of Mormon, either a daughter of Ishmael or a mother of the daughters of Ishmael (1948). Comic by John Philip Dalby.

The Book of Mormon has been criticized for its lack of significant female characters in the narrative. In the Old Testament, male pronouns "he" and "his" are mentioned 6.5 times more than female pronouns "she" and "her", but in the Book of Mormon, the ratio is 31 times more often, and in the small plates of Nephi, it is 46 times more often. Only six female characters are explicitly named in the Book of Mormon (Sariah the wife of Lehi, Abish a Lamanitish woman, Isabel the harlot, Eve, Sarah, and Mary), compared to 188 in the Bible. No woman, except perhaps the wife of King Lamoni, in the Book of Mormon is portrayed as having her own independent connection with heaven.

=== Views toward race ===
Harvard PhD Max Perry Mueller has pointed out the picture of race presented in the Book of Mormon, saying the "Book of Mormon's racial hermeneutic equates whiteness with righteousness, civilization, and Christianity. It defines blackness as heathenism, apostasy, and savagery."

== Historical accuracy ==
Most, but not all, Mormons hold the book's connection to ancient American history as an article of their faith. According to Professor John-Charles Duffy, this view finds little acceptance outside of Mormonism because "scholars realize that accepting the Book of Mormon's antiquity also means coming to terms with LDS beliefs about Joseph Smith's access to supernatural powers." The theory that the Book of Mormon is an ancient American history is thus considered to fall outside academic credibility. Mormon apologetics have proposed multiple theories tying Book of Mormon places to modern locations.

=== Anachronisms ===
There are a number of words and phrases in the Book of Mormon that are anachronistic—their presence in the text is at odds with known linguistic patterns, archaeological findings, or historical events. Each anachronism is a word, phrase, artifact, or other concept that critics, historians, archaeologists, or linguists believe did not exist in the Americas during the time period when the Book of Mormon is said to have been written. (See anachronisms in the Book of Mormon for more details, including apologetic viewpoints and discussion.)

Subject	Reference Verse		Problem	Date
Cimeter (interpreted as scimitar)	Mosiah 9:16	And it came to pass that I did arm them with bows, and with arrows, with swords, and with cimeters, and with clubs, and with slings, and with all manner of weapons which we could invent, and I and my people did go forth against the Lamanites to battle. (See also Enos 1:20; Mosiah 10:8; Alma 2:12; 27:29; 43:18, 20, 37; 44:8; 60:2; Heaman 1:14)	Scimitars (curved swords) did not exist until the 500s.	200–187 BC
Elephants	Ether 9:19	And they also had horses, and asses, and there were elephants and cureloms and cumoms; all of which were useful unto man, and more especially the elephants and cureloms and cumoms.	Elephants did not exist in America at the time of Ether.	About 2700–2400 BC
Horses	1 Nephi 18:25	And it came to pass that we did find upon the land of promise, as we journeyed in the wilderness, that there were beasts in the forests of every kind, both the cow and the ox, and the ass and the horse, and the goat and the wild goat, and all manner of wild animals, which were for the use of men. And we did find all manner of ore, both of gold, and of silver, and of copper. (Horses see 2 Nephi 12:7; 2 Nephi 15:28; Enos 1:21; Alma 18:9, 10,12; 20:6; 3 Nephi 3:22; 4:4; 6:1; 21:14; Ether 9:19; )	Horses on the American continent went extinct prior to the arrival of the Nephites (c. 600 BC) and were not reintroduced until the 16th century.	590–589 BC
Steel	1 Nephi 4:9	And I beheld his sword, and I drew it forth from the sheath thereof; and the hilt thereof was of pure gold, and the workmanship thereof was exceedingly fine, and I saw that the blade thereof was of the most precious steel. (See also 1 Neph 16:18; 2 Nephi 5:15; Jarom 1:8; Ether 7:9)	While steel (carburized iron) was known in Israel as early as the time of king Josiah there is no archaeological evidence of steel production in pre-Columbian America. Apologists counter that the word "steel" may refer to another hardened metal, such as the copper alloy that is translated "steel" in the KJV.	600–592 BC
Wheat and barley	Mosiah 9:9	And we began to till the ground, yea, even with all manner of seeds: with seeds of corn and of wheat and of barley ...	Wheat and barley were brought to America by Europeans except for "little barley", the kernels of which form part of the pre-Columbian Eastern Agricultural Complex of cultivated plants used by Native Americans and which has been carbon-dated to 2,500 years ago. Little barley samples that date to 900 AD were also found in Phoenix, Arizona, and samples from Southern Illinois date between 1 and 900 AD.	About 200–187 BC
Sheep	Ether 9:18	and also all manner of cattle, of oxen and cows, and of sheep and of swine and of goats ...	Europeans brought sheep to America.	About 2200–600 BC
Goats	1 Ne. 18:25	both the cow and the ox and the ass and the horse and the goat and the wild goat ...	Europeans introduced the first domesticated goats to America.	
Cattle and cows	Ether 9:18	and also all manner of cattle, of oxen and cows, and of sheep and of swine and of goats ...	There is no evidence that Old World cattle (members of the genus Bos) inhabited the New World prior to European contact in the 17th century AD.	
Swine	Ether 9:18	and also all manner of cattle, of oxen and cows, and of sheep and of swine and of goats ...	Europeans brought the first swine to America.	
Quoting of Second Isaiah	2 Ne. 7:1	Yea, for thus saith the Lord: Have I put thee away or have I cast thee off forever ...	In general, modern scholars believe Isaiah chapters 40–66 were written during the Babylonian Captivity between 586 BC and 538 BC. Lehi would not have had access to these chapters since he left for the New World around 600 BC.	
Apparent quoting of the New Testament	1 Nephi 22:17	shall be saved, even if it so be as by fire (cf. 1 Corinthians 3:15)	Paul did not write this epistle for another 600 years after Nephi's death.	

=== Archaeology ===
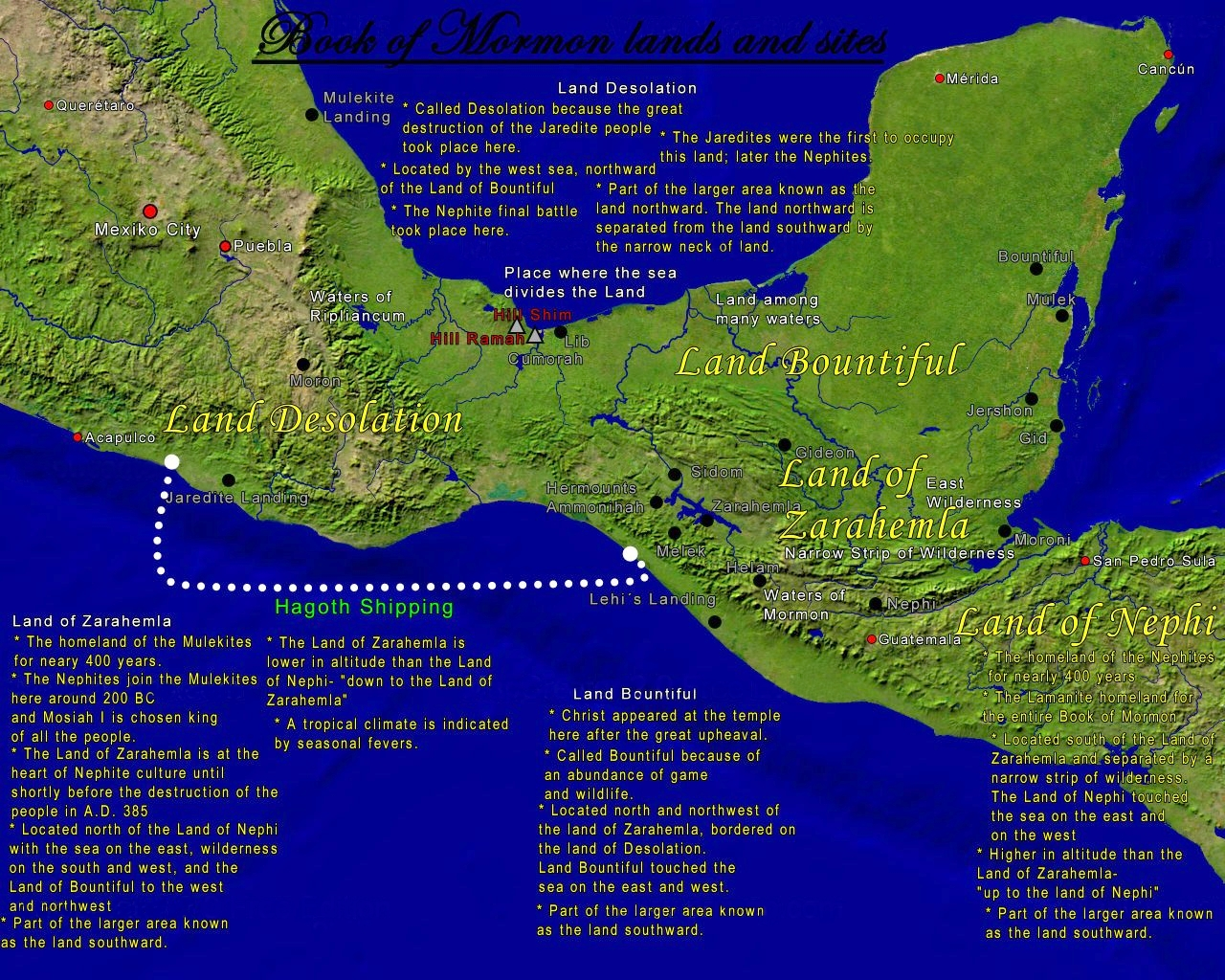
Map showing one hypothesis (among Mormon apologists) of the lands and sites of the Book of Mormon in Mesoamerica

Since the publication of the Book of Mormon in 1830, both Mormon and non-Mormon archaeologists have attempted to find archaeological evidence to support or criticize it. Members of the Church of Jesus Christ of Latter-day Saints (LDS Church) and other denominations of the Latter Day Saint movement generally believe that the Book of Mormon describes ancient historical events in the Americas, but mainstream historians and archaeologists do not regard it as a work of ancient American history.

Some early 20th century researchers presented various archaeological findings such as place names, and ruins of the Inca, Maya, Olmec, and other ancient American and Old World civilizations as giving credence to the Book of Mormon record. Others disagree with these conclusions, arguing that the Book of Mormon mentions several animals, plants, and technologies that are not substantiated by the archaeological record between 3100 BC to 400 AD in America.

=== Native American genetics ===
Mainstream scientists have found that the Native Americans have very distinctive DNA markers, and that some of them are most similar, among old world populations, to the DNA of people anciently associated with the Altay Mountains area of central Asia. This conclusion from a genetic perspective supports a large amount of archaeological, anthropological, and linguistic evidence that Native American peoples' ancestors migrated from Asia at the latest 16,500–13,000 years ago.

The mainstream scientific consensus about the origins of ancient Americans and peoples is apparently at odds with the claims in the Book of Mormon, although Mormon apologists have sought to reconcile these apparent contradictions.

The Church of Jesus Christ of Latter-Day Saints released an essay on their website titled "Book of Mormon and DNA Studies". The essay argues that "the evidence is simply inconclusive."

=== Population size and the Book of Mormon ===
Based on details and events in the Book of Mormon narrative that establish minimum population sizes and the timelines between those events, critics challenge the viability of the Book of Mormon people's population sizes and growth. M. T. Lamb was perhaps the first to suggest that the Book of Mormon has an unrealistic population growth rate. Modern studies on population size and growth have been done by John Kunich. Kunich's analysis agrees with Lamb's that the Book of Mormon presents an unrealistic growth rate for the population.

=== Chronological problem ===
The Book of Mormon claims that Lehi left Jerusalem "in the commencement of the first year of the reign of Zedekiah, king of Judah," which was 597 BCE. The Book of Mormon also claims that Jesus was born precisely "six hundred years from the time that Lehi left Jerusalem." However, Jesus is now understood to have likely been born c. 6–4 BCE. Therefore, there were between 593 and 591 years between the referenced dates, instead of the 600 cited in the Book of Mormon.

== Theology ==
Scholars such as Fawn M. Brodie have pointed out that the theology presented in the Book of Mormon diverges from traditional Mormon beliefs (e.g., the belief of an eternal damnation in hell in the Book of Mormon vs Universalism).

Universalism, or the doctrine that all humanity would be saved, was a prominent theology that peaked in popularity in the northeastern United States in the 1820s and 1830s. The Book of Mormon contains a number of sermons and passages that use anti-Universalist religious arguments common to that time and place, not known to have occurred in any ancient American setting. The existence of 19th century anti-Universalist arguments and rhetoric in the Book of Mormon has been pointed out as anachronistic by various scholars, including Fawn M. Brodie and Dan Vogel. In response, Mormon apologists argue that, because Book of Mormon prophets were miraculously shown the peoples of the 19th century, and the audience of the Book of Mormon was people in the 19th century, that Book of Mormon prophets would have been intimately familiar with anti-Universalist rhetoric and purposefully used it to convince modern-day readers.

The satisfaction theory of atonement was a medieval theological development, created to explain how God could be both merciful and just through an infinite atonement. It is considered anachronistic, as it is not known to have appeared in any ancient American setting.

== General defenses ==
=== Existence of golden plates ===
Two separate sets of witnesses, a set of three and a set of eight, testified as having seen the golden plates, the record from which the Book of Mormon was translated. Additionally, each of the Three Witnesses (Martin Harris, Oliver Cowdery, and David Whitmer) left the church during Joseph Smith's lifetime and considered Smith to have been a fallen prophet. Harris and Cowdery later returned to the church. Josiah Stowell, not one of the original sets of witnesses, under oath of the court, indicated that he saw a portion of the plate stack.

Apologists note that the witnesses in most cases affirmed their testimonies until their death such as Whitmer who issued an affidavit in 1881 reaffirming his testimony of the experience.

=== Chiasmus ===
Supporters of the Book of Mormon say it uses chiasmus—a figure of speech utilizing inverted parallelism—and point to it as evidence supporting the book's ancient origin. Critics such as Jerald and Sandra Tanner argue that chiasmus in the Book of Mormon is a characteristic of Joseph Smith's speech pattern and not evidence of antiquity. They cite the use of chiasmus in the Doctrine and Covenants, which was not translated from an ancient text, as evidence. Scholar D. Michael Quinn argues that chiasmus was publicly known in Joseph Smith's environs, and that two books describing chiasmus were available in a Palmyra book store and advertised for sale in a local newspaper prior to the production of the Book of Mormon.

== See also ==
- Criticism of Mormon sacred texts
- Criticism of the Church of Jesus Christ of Latter-day Saints
- Critical appraisal of the Book of Abraham
