= Nathan J. Harris =

American politician (1864–1936)

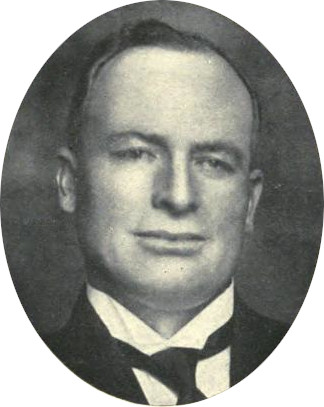
- Nathan J. Harris

District Judge; Member of Utah Legislature
- In office 1910 – January 1, 1917

Member of the 1st Utah State Legislature
- In office 1896–1897

Personal details
- Born: March 29, 1864 Harrisville, Weber, Utah Territory, United States
- Died: November 19, 1936 (aged 72)
- Party: Republican
- Spouse: Emma Elvira Oakason
- Children: 9
- Education: University of Utah; University of Michigan Law School (J.D., 1894)
- Profession: Lawyer; Judge; Politician

Nathan John Harris (March 29, 1864 - November 19, 1936) was an early Utah lawyer and district judge who served as a member of the first legislature of the State of Utah.

== Biography ==
Harris was born March 29, 1864, at Harrisville, Utah to Martin Henderson Harris, early settler and namesake of Harrisville, Utah, and Louisa Sargent. He was the third child in a family of four boys and three girls. His early schooling included instruction under Louis F. Moench. He later attended the University of Utah, where he taught himself the organ. Harris attended the University of Michigan Law School, graduating in June 1894.

Upon his return to Utah, Harris established a law practice at Ogden. He was a member of the Constitutional Convention which formed the laws for the State of Utah, and was also a member of the first and second legislatures of the State of Utah. Harris served as Justice of the Peace and school trustee at Harrisville and was active in politics in Weber County, being a member of the Republican Party. He was County Attorney for two terms and was appointed District Judge and served one unexpired term of two years, and was elected for two four-year terms.

A nephew of Martin Harris, one of the Three Witnesses to the Book of Mormon, Harris was a lifelong active member of the Church of Jesus Christ of Latter-day Saints. He served as Sunday School teacher, Assistant Superintendent, and later became Superintendent of the Sunday School at Harrisville. He served a mission to the Southern States from 1901 to 1903 and was secretary of the Mission. Harris was a collector of early LDS Church and Utah books. He was also an avid gardener and skilled teacher.

== Family ==
On June 15, 1887, at Logan, Utah, he married Emma Elvira Oakason of Salt Lake City. To them were born 9 children, five boys and four girls.
