= Anachronisms in the Book of Mormon =

Overview of Book of Mormon anachronisms

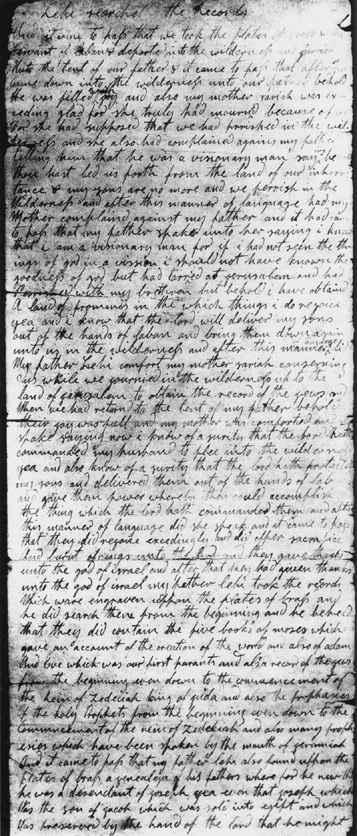
A page from the original manuscript of the Book of Mormon, covering 1 Nephi 4:38- 5:14

There are a number of anachronistic words and phrases in the Book of Mormon that are consistent with authorship of the text in the nineteenth century and inconsistent with claims that the text was written centuries earlier. Each of the anachronisms is a word, phrase, artifact, or other concept that did not exist in the Americas during the time period in which Mormonism founder Joseph Smith said the Book of Mormon was originally written.

== Background ==
According to Joseph Smith, the Book of Mormon was originally engraved on golden plates, which he received in 1827 from an angel named Moroni, whom Smith identified as a resurrected former inhabitant of the American continent. Smith said he translated the original text of the plates into English, and that a portion of the text was written on the plates in what he termed reformed Egyptian.

The Book of Mormon is attested by many believers in its authenticity to have taken place somewhere in the Americas from c. 2500 BC to 420 AD, thus placing its events within the pre-Columbian era.

Latter Day Saint scholars and apologists have attempted to deal with these in multiple ways. Depending on the anachronism in question, apologists attempt to: establish parallels to currently known ancient cultures, technologies, plants or animals; reframe the usage of individual words in question; question assumptions that may lead to an apparent anachronism; or point out that it is not known exactly where the Book of Mormon actually took place, and so supporting evidence simply remains to be found because, presumably, archeologists have not been looking in the right places.

== Historical anachronisms ==
As archaeology became more professionalized and reliable, it became clear that some of the plants, animals, and artifacts mentioned in passing were out of place in pre-Columbian America, including horses, cattle, asses, goats, swine, elephants, wheat, silk, iron, steel, brass, and chariots. More recently, DNA studies have failed to find connections between Native Americans and Near Eastern peoples, and no non-Mormon linguists have recognized any direct contact between New World and Old World languages. [...] There are no authenticated reports of pre-Columbian New World sites that show any evidence of Old World influence in the form of pottery, tools, weapons, inscriptions, or agricultural products.

— Grant Hardy (2023)

=== Quoting Isaiah ===
Book of Mormon prophets quote chapters 48 through 54 of the Book of Isaiah after having left Jerusalem around 600 BC. Since Isaiah died around 698 BC, under traditional biblical belief, there would be no conflict. However, it is widely accepted that these chapters were not written by Isaiah, but rather by one or more other people during the Babylonian captivity, sometime between 586 and 538 BC (between 14 and 82 years after it could have been known to the Book of Mormon prophets). This would imply the composition of the Book of Mormon occurred after the second and third anonymous authors of the book of Isaiah (called Deutero-Isaiah and Trito-Isaiah, respectively) finished their work during the Babylonian captivity and Second Temple eras of Jewish history. No Latter-day Saint arguments for a unified Isaiah or criticisms of the Deutero-Isaiah and Trito-Isaiah understandings have matched the extent of scholarship supporting later datings for authorship.

=== Books of Moses ===
In the Book of Mormon around 600 BC, a prophet Nephi and his brothers recover brass plates that they discovered

"...did contain the five books of Moses, which gave an account of the creation of the world, and also of Adam and Eve, who were our first parents; And also a record of the Jews from the beginning, even down to the commencement of the reign of Zedekiah, king of Judah; And also the prophecies of the holy prophets, from the beginning, even down to the commencement of the reign of Zedekiah;"

What is commonly understood as the five books of Moses was not completely written, compiled or attributed to Moses as the author until after the Babylonian captivity. Modern scholarly consensus rejects authorship by Moses, affirms that it had multiple authors, and was composed over centuries. Additionally, the concept of the Books of Moses followed by a history and then the writings of the prophets reflects a contemporary understanding of the Christian Old Testament. David Bokovoy writes, "The concept of five Mosaic books, however, is clearly anachronistic. Moreover, it is extremely difficult to imagine that these books could have existed as an Egyptian translation. There's no historical evidence that Judean scribes translated what would become biblical texts into a foreign language until the second century BC; and when they did, it was the Greek Septuagint."

=== Baptism ===
Baptism is mentioned as a ritual that is taught and performed among the Nephites, with its first mention being taught by Nephi, son of Lehi between 559 and 545 BC. Research by Everett Ferguson (2009) has concluded that "the date for the origin of proselyte baptism cannot be determined."

Both Christian and Rabbinic baptism is rooted in the washings in the Book of Leviticus, which traditional Biblical timelines date to approximately 1445 BC although current texts are considered to date from the Achaemenid Empire, which began about 539 BC. A practice similar to baptism is known to have been practiced by the Essenes between the 2nd century BC and the 1st century AD. The Jewish Encyclopedia of 1906 compares Christian baptism to ancient Jewish ritual purification and initiation rites involving immersion in water and states that "Baptism was practised in ancient (Hasidean or Essene) Judaism".

=== Dating of known historical events ===
The Book of Mormon chronology accounts for 600 years from the time that Lehi "came out" of Jerusalem to the birth of Jesus Christ, reflecting an 1820s view of the timeline but which contradicts the timing of known historical events. Lehi is said to have left Jerusalem in the first year of the reign of Zedekiah, which occurred in 597 BC. The date of birth of Jesus was no later than 4 BC, based on the Bible stating that it occurred during the reign of Herod the Great, who died in 4 BC. However, ancient Hebrews used a lunar calendar of 360 days for a year. This would place the date of the birth of Jesus, according to Book of Mormon, at 6 BC.

== Flora and fauna anachronisms ==
=== Horses ===
There are several instances where horses are mentioned in the Book of Mormon, and are portrayed as being in the forest upon first arrival of the Nephites, "raise(d)", "fed", "prepared" (in conjunction with chariots), used for food, and being "useful unto man". There is no evidence that horses existed on the American continent during the time frame of the Book of Mormon. While there were horses in North America during the Pleistocene, and modern horses partly evolved in the Americas, fossil records show that they became extinct on the American continent approximately 10,000 years ago. Horses did not reappear in the Americas until the Spaniards brought them from Europe. They were brought to the Caribbean by Christopher Columbus in 1493, and to the American continent by Hernán Cortés in 1519. There is currently no convincing evidence that the horse survived until the period of the Mesoamerican civilizations.

=== Elephants ===
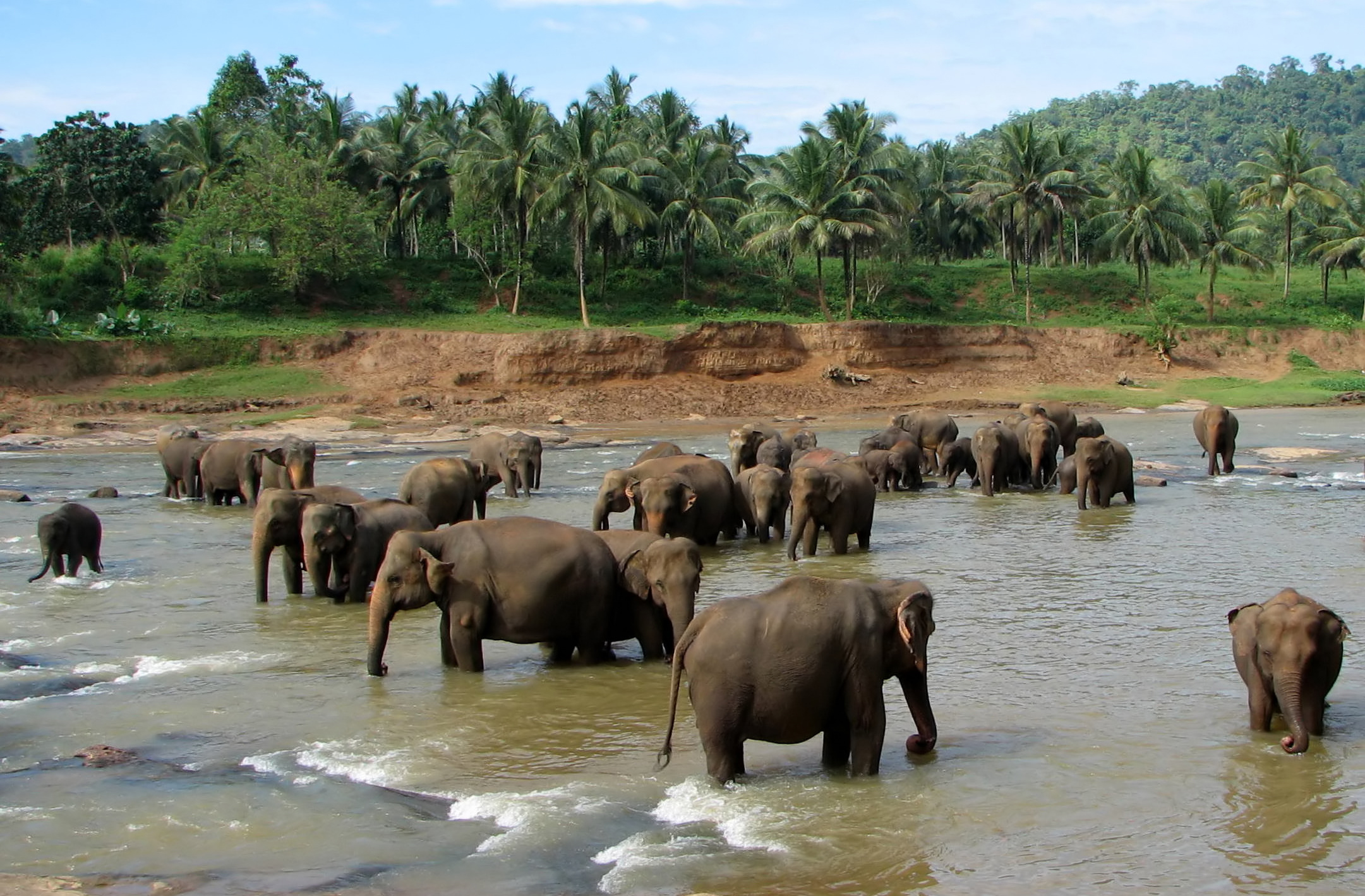
Elephants are mentioned in the Book of Ether. There is no evidence of elephants in the Americas during times associated with the Book of Mormon.

Elephants are mentioned twice in a single verse in the Book of Ether and are indicated to be at least semi-domesticated. Mastodons and mammoths lived in the New World during the Pleistocene and the very early Holocene with a disappearance of the Mastodon from North America about 10,500 years ago where recent eDNA research of sediments indicates mammoths survived in north central Siberia at least as late as 2000 BC, in continental northeast Siberia until at least 5300 BC, and until at least 6600 BC in North America. The fossil record indicates that they became extinct along with most of the megafauna towards the end of the last glacial period. The source of this extinction, known as the Holocene extinction is speculated to be the result of human predation, a significant climate change, or a combination of both factors. It is known that a small population of mammoths survived on Saint Paul Island, Alaska, up until 5725 BP (3705 BC), but this date is more than 1000 years before the Jaredite record in the Book of Mormon begins.

=== Cattle and cows ===
There are four separate instances of "cows" or "cattle" in the New World in the Book of Mormon, including verbiage that they were "raise(d)" and were "for the use of man" or "useful for the food of man." There is no evidence that specifically Old World cattle (members of the genus Bos) inhabited the New World prior to European contact in the 16th century AD.

=== Goats ===
There are four mentions of the existence of goats in the Book of Mormon. The Jaredites noted goats "were useful for the food of man" (approximately 2300 BC), the Nephites did "find" "the goat and the wild goat" upon arrival (approximately 589 BC) and later "raise(d)" "goats and wild goats" (approximately 500 BC), and the goat was mentioned allegorically (approximately 80 BC).

Domesticated goats are not native to the Americas, having been domesticated in prehistoric times on the Eurasian continent. Domesticated goats are believed to have been introduced on the American continent upon the arrival of the Europeans in the 15th century, 1000 years after the conclusion of the Book of Mormon, and nearly 2000 years after they are last mentioned in the Book of Mormon. The mountain goat is indigenous to North America and has been hunted, and the fleece used for clothing. However it has never been domesticated, and is known for being aggressive towards humans.

Early Spanish observers of Mesoamerican wildlife sometimes characterized species such as the small brocket deer as "goats" and "wild goats".

=== Swine ===
"Swine" are referred to twice in the Book of Mormon, and states that the swine were "useful for the food of man" among the Jaredites. There have not been any remains, references, artwork, tools, or any other evidence suggesting that swine were ever present in the pre-Columbian New World.

=== Barley and wheat ===
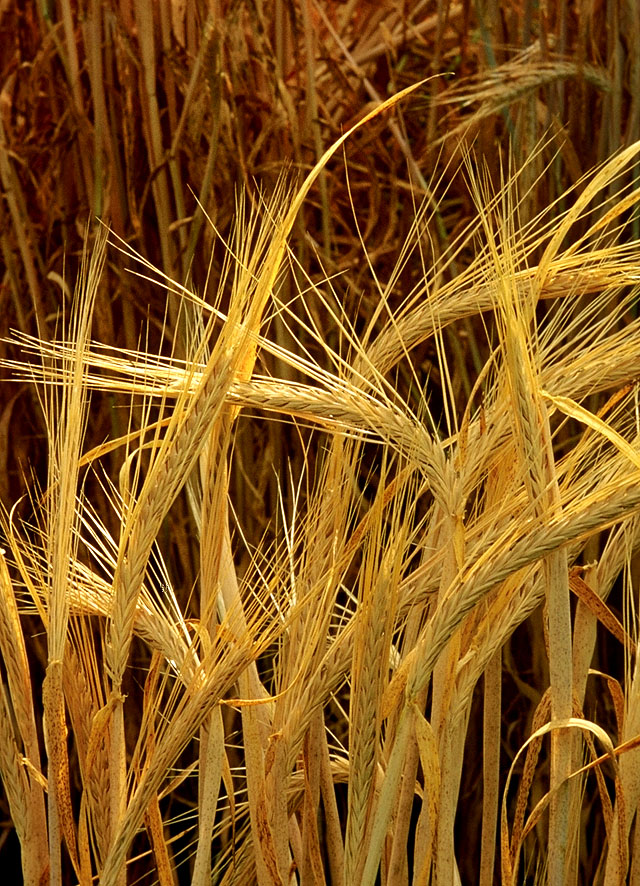
Barley

Grains are mentioned 28 times in the Book of Mormon, including "barley" and "wheat". The introduction of domesticated modern barley and wheat to the New World was made by Europeans sometime after 1492, many centuries after the time in which the Book of Mormon is set.

FARMS scholar Robert Bennett suggests either that the terms barley and wheat were plants given Old World designations, or the terms may refer to genuine New World varieties of the plants. He also postulates that references to "barley" could refer to Hordeum pusillum, also known as "little barley", a species of grass with edible seeds native to the Americas. Evidence exists that this plant was cultivated in North America in the Woodland periods contemporary with mound-builder societies (early centuries AD) and has been carbon-dated to 2,500 years ago, although it is questionable whether it was ever domesticated.

== Technology anachronisms ==
=== Chariots ===
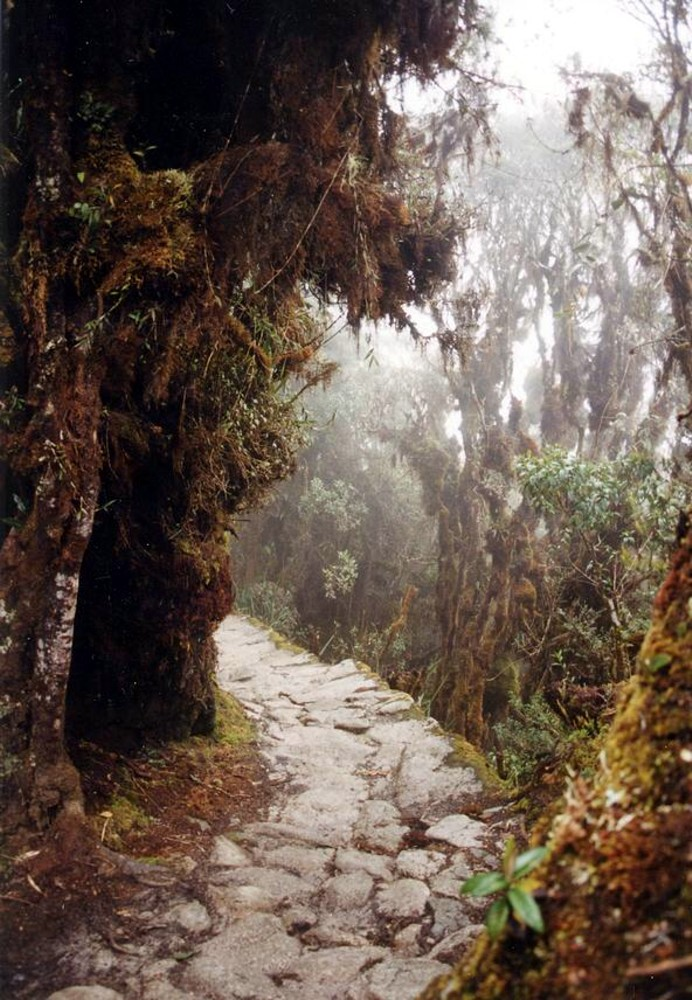
Inca road in Peru

The Book of Mormon mentions the presence of "chariots" in three instances, in two instances (both around 90 BC at the same location) inferring them as a mode of transportation. There is no archaeological evidence to support the use of wheeled vehicles in pre-Columbian Mesoamerica. Many parts of ancient Mesoamerica were not suitable for wheeled transport. Clark Wissler, the Curator of Ethnography at the American Museum of Natural History in New York City, noted: "we see that the prevailing mode of land transport in the New World was by human carrier. The wheel was unknown in pre-Columbian times."

Wheels were used in a limited context in Mesoamerica for what were probably ritual objects, "small clay animal effigies mounted on wheels." Richard Diehl and Margaret Mandeville have documented the archaeological discovery of wheeled toys in Teotihuacan, Tres Zapotes, Veracruz, and Panuco in Mesoamerica. Some of these wheeled toys were referred to by Smithsonian archaeologist William Henry Holmes and archaeologist Désiré Charnay as "chariots". While these items establish that the concept of the wheel was known in ancient Mesoamerica, lack of suitable draft animals and a terrain unsuitable for wheeled traffic are the probable reasons that wheeled transport was never developed."

A comparison of the South American Inca civilization to Mesoamerican civilizations shows the same lack of wheeled vehicles. Although the Incas used a vast network of paved roads, these roads are so rough, steep, and narrow that they were likely unsuitable for wheeled use. Bridges that the Inca people built, and even continue to use and maintain today in some remote areas, are straw-rope bridges so narrow (about 2–3 feet wide) that no wheeled vehicle can fit. Inca roads were used mainly by chaski message runners and llama caravans. Mayan paved roads at Yucatan had characteristics which could allow the use of wheeled vehicles, but there is no evidence that those highways were used other than by people on foot and nobles who were borne on litters.

=== Compass ===
The Book of Mormon also states that a "compass" or "Liahona" was used by Nephi in the 6th-century BC. The compass is widely recognized to have been invented in China around 1100 AD, and remains of a compass have never been found in America. In the Book of Alma, Alma explains to his son that "our fathers called it Liahona, which is, being interpreted, a compass". The Church of Jesus Christ of Latter-day Saints' Guide to the Scriptures describes the Liahona as "a brass ball with two pointers that gave directions—as a compass—and also spiritual instruction to Lehi and his followers when they were righteous." It further states that the Liahona was provided by the Lord to Lehi and his followers rather than being created by them.

=== Windows ===
The Book of Mormon implies that the Jaredite people were familiar with the concept of "windows" near the time of the biblical Tower of Babel, and that they specifically avoided crafting windows for lighting in their covered seagoing vessels, because of fears that "they would be dashed in pieces" during the ocean voyage.

=== Uses of metal ===
The Book of Mormon mentions a number of metals, and the use of metal.

==== "Dross" ====
The word "dross" appears twice in the Book of Alma, dross being a byproduct of the refining of metals.

==== Steel and iron ====
Three instances of "steel" in the New World are mentioned in the Book of Mormon, one early amongst the Jaredites after their arrival around 2400 BC, one immediately after the Lehi party's arrival in the New World discussing Nephi's knowledge of steel at approximately 580 BC, and one occurrence amongst the Nephites around 400 BC. Four instances of "iron" in the New World are mentioned in the Book of Mormon, one amongst the Jaredites around 1000 BC, one immediately after the Lehi party's arrival in the New World discussing Nephi's knowledge of iron at approximately 580 BC, and two of occurrence amongst the Nephites, one around 400 BC and the other around 160 BC.

==== Metal swords ====
The Book of Mormon makes numerous references to "swords" and their use in battle. What the swords are made of is mostly ambiguous except for two instances involving the Jaredites. The first was an early battle (around 2400 BC) involving the king Shule which used "steel" swords. When the remnants of the Jaredite's abandoned cities were discovered (around 120 BC), the Book of Mormon narrative states that some swords were brought back "the hilts thereof have perished, and the blades thereof were cankered with rust", suggesting that these swords had metal blades.

==== Cimeters ====
"Cimeters" are mentioned in eight instances in the Book of Mormon stretching from approximately 500 BC to 51 BC. Critics argue this existed hundreds of years before the term "scimitar" was coined. The word "cimiter" is considered an anachronism since the word was never used by the Hebrews (from which some of the Book of Mormon peoples came) or any other civilization prior to 450 AD and because metal swords are not found in the Americas in the Book of Mormon timeframe. The word 'cimeterre' is found in the 1661 English dictionary Glossographia and is defined as "a crooked sword" and was part of the English language at the time that the Book of Mormon was translated. In the 7th century, scimitars generally first appeared among the Turko-Mongol nomads of Central Asia.

==== System of exchange using precious metals ====
The Book of Mormon details a system of measures used by the Nephite society, based on metal coinage.

No form of fiat currency, such as measures of gold for grain as described in the Book of Mormon, is known to have actually existed in any pre-Columbian culture. The vast majority of ancient Native American economies were gift economies, which do not use any form of currency and instead rely on reciprocal exchanges governed by social goodwill. Limited use of commodity currencies existed in large empires, such as in Mesoamerica where cacao beans were sometimes used, but the overall use of metal in ancient America was extremely limited.

== Linguistic anachronisms ==
=== Knowledge of a modified Hebrew and reformed Egyptian languages ===
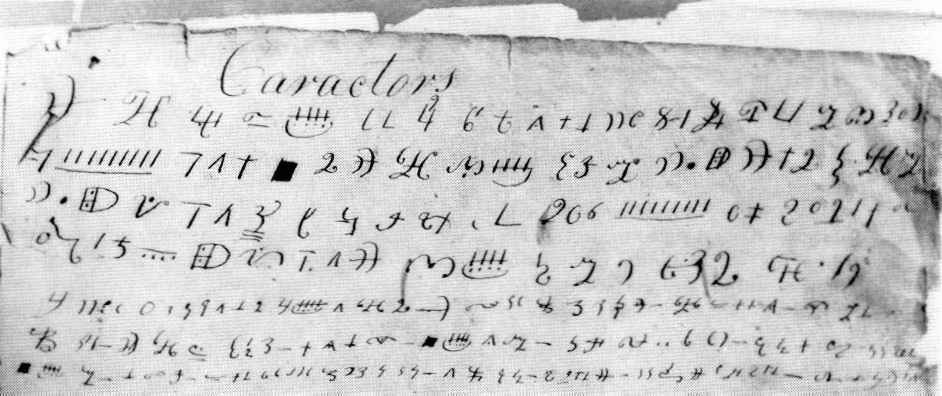
Photograph of the document known as the Caractors document, with reformed Egyptian symbols

The Book of Mormon account refers to various groups of literate peoples, at least one of which is described as using a language and writing system with roots in Hebrew and Egyptian. Fifteen examples of distinct scripts have been identified in pre-Columbian Mesoamerica, many from a single inscription. Archaeological dating methods make it difficult to establish which was earliest (and hence the forebear from which the others developed) and a significant portion of the documented scripts have not been deciphered. None of the documented Mesoamerican language scripts have any relation to Hebrew or Egyptian. The Book of Mormon describes another literate culture, the Jaredites, but does not identify the language or writing system by name. The text that describes the Jaredites (Book of Ether) refers only to a language used prior to the alleged confounding of languages at the great tower, presumably a reference to the Tower of Babel.

Linguistic studies on the evolution of the spoken languages of the Americas agree with the widely held model that the initial colonization of the Americas by Homo sapiens occurred over 10,000 years ago.

=== "Christ" and "Messiah" ===
The words "Christ" and "Messiah" are used several hundred times throughout the Book of Mormon. The first instance of the word "Christ" in the Book of Mormon dates to between 559 and 545 BC. The first instance of the word "Messiah" dates to about 600 BC.

"Christ" is the English transliteration of the Greek word Χριστός (transliterated precisely as Christós); it is relatively synonymous with the Hebrew word rendered "Messiah" (Hebrew: מָשִׁיחַ, Modern: Mašīaḥ, Tiberian: Māšīaḥ). Both words have the meaning of "anointed", and are used in the Bible to refer to "the Anointed One". In Greek translations of the Old Testament (including the Septuagint), the word "Christ" is used for the Hebrew "Messiah", and in Hebrew translations of the New Testament, the word "Messiah" is used for the Greek "Christ". Any usage in the Bible of the word "Christ" can be alternately translated as "Messiah" with no change in meaning (e.g. Matthew 1:1, 16, 18). The word "Christ" is found in English dictionaries at the time of the translation of the plates so was not considered an exclusively Greek word at that time.

The Book of Mormon uses both terms throughout the book. In the vast majority of cases, it uses the terms in an identical manner as the Bible, where it does not matter which word is used:

And now, my sons, remember, remember that it is upon the rock of our Redeemer, who is Christ, the Son of God, that ye must build your foundation; that when the devil shall send forth his mighty winds, yea, his shafts in the whirlwind, yea, when all his hail and his mighty storm shall beat upon you, it shall have no power over you to drag you down to the gulf of misery and endless wo, because of the rock upon which ye are built, which is a sure foundation, a foundation whereon if men build they cannot fall. (Helaman 5:12)

And after he had baptized the Messiah with water, he should behold and bear record that he had baptized the Lamb of God, who should take away the sins of the world. (1 Nephi 10:10)

The Book of Mormon occasionally uses the word "Christ" in a way that is not interchangeable with "Messiah". For example, in 2 Nephi 10:3, the Book of Mormon prophet Jacob says an angel informed him that the name of the Messiah would be Christ:

Wherefore, as I said unto you, it must needs be expedient that Christ—for in the last night the angel spake unto me that this should be his name—should come among the Jews (2 Nephi 10:3)

The word "Messiah" is used in the text before this point, but from this point on the word "Christ" is used almost exclusively.

Richard Packham argues that the Greek word "Christ" in the Book of Mormon challenges the authenticity of the work since Joseph Smith clearly stated that, "There was no Greek or Latin upon the plates from which I, through the grace of the Lord, translated the Book of Mormon."

=== Greek names ===
Joseph Smith stated in a letter to the editor of Times and Seasons, "There was no Greek or Latin upon the plates from which I, through the grace of the Lord, translated the Book of Mormon." The Book of Mormon contains some names which appear to be Greek (e.g. Timothy), some of which are Hellenizations of Hebrew names (e.g. Antipas, Archeantus, Esrom, Ezias, Jonas, Judea, Lachoneus, and Zenos).

=== "Church" and "synagogue" ===
The word "church" first occurs in 1 Nephi 4:26, where a prophet named Nephi disguises himself as Laban, a prominent man in Jerusalem whom Nephi had slain:

And he [Laban's servant], supposing that I spake of the brethren of the church, and that I was truly that Laban whom I had slain, wherefore he did follow me (1 Nephi 4:26).

According to the Book of Mormon, this exchange happened in Jerusalem, around 600 BC. The meaning of the word "church" in the Book of Mormon is more comparable to usage in the KJV than modern English. Aside from its extensive use throughout the New Testament, the sense of a convocation of believers can be attached to certain wordings in the Old Testament. For instance, Psalms 89:5 speaks of praising the Lord "in the congregation of the saints"; the Septuagint contains the Greek word "ecclesia" for "congregation", which is also translated as "church" in the New Testament.

A similar question regards the word "synagogue", found in Alma 16:13:

And Alma and Amulek went forth preaching repentance to the people in their temples, and in their sanctuaries, and also in their synagogues, which were built after the manner of the Jews (Alma 16:13).

Scholars note that synagogues did not exist in their modern form before the destruction of the temple and the Babylonian captivity. The oldest known synagogue is located in Delos, Greece, and has been dated to 150 BC.

=== The name "Isabel" as an anachronism ===
The name Isabel appears in the Book of Mormon at Alma 39:3. According to the Book of Mormon, Isabel lived about 74 BC. Isabel is a female name of Spanish origin. It originates as the medieval Spanish form of Elisabeth (ultimately Hebrew Elisheva). The name arose in the 12th century AD well after the Isabel in the Book of Mormon.

== King James's translation ==
A significant portion of the Book of Mormon quotes from the brass plates, which purport to be another source of Old Testament writings mirroring those of the Bible. In many cases, the biblical quotations in the English-language Book of Mormon, are close, or identical to the equivalent sections of the KJV. Critics consider several Book of Mormon anachronisms to originate in the KJV.

=== "All the ships of the sea, and upon all the ships of Tarshish" ===
Isaiah 2:16 is quoted in the Book of Mormon 2 Nephi 12:16, but includes a mistranslated line from the Septuagint, where the word Tarshish was mistaken for a similar Greek word for "sea" (THARSES and THALASSES). Furthermore, the added line in the Book of Mormon disrupts the synonymous parallelisms in the poetic structure of the section. As the error appeared in Septuagint the 3rd century BCE this is anachronistic to the 6th century BCE setting of 2 Nephi.

Translations of Isaiah 2:16
Book of Mormon	King James Version	Septuagint
And upon all the ships of the sea, and upon all the ships of Tarshish and upon all pleasant pictures.	And upon all the ships of Tarshish and upon all pleasant pictures.	And upon every ship of the sea, and upon every display of fine ships.

The Septuagint version of the verse was discussed in numerous readily available Bible commentaries in the 1820s, including ones by William Lowth, Thomas Scott, and John Wesley.

=== "Satyr" ===
In 2 Nephi 23:21, the Book of Mormon quotes Isaiah 13:21, which mentions a "satyr". Satyrs are creatures from Greek mythology, which are half-man, half-goat. The KJV translates Isaiah 34:14 thus:

The wild beasts of the desert shall also meet with the wild beasts of the island, and the satyr shall cry to his fellow; the screech owl also shall rest there, and find for herself a place of rest. ("וְרָבְצוּ־שָׁם צִיִּים וּמָלְאוּ בָתֵּיהֶם אֹחִים וְשָׁכְנוּ שָׁם בְּנֹות יַֽעֲנָה וּשְׂעִירִים יְרַקְּדוּ־")

Other English-language versions of the Bible, including the New International Version, translate the word שעיר (sa`iyr) as "wild goat"; other translations include "monkey" and "dancing devil".

=== New Testament anachronisms ===
The Book of Mormon has 441 phrases that are seven words or longer that appear in the King James Version of the New Testament demonstrating that the Book of Mormon postdates the 1611 King James Translation of the Bible. This is problematic both because the authors of the New Testament and Book of Mormon were geographically separate, and in instances where the portions of the New Testament were quoted hundreds of years earlier. Extended quoted sections include portions of Mark 16, Acts 3, 1 Corinthians 12–13, and 1 John 3. Specific derivative sections include:

- Moroni's discourse on faith (Ether 12) is derived from the Epistle to the Hebrews (Hebrews 11).
- Alma chapter 7 and 13 discussion on Melchizedek shows reliance on Hebrews 7.
- The longer ending of Mark is almost universally rejected by scholars as not being original to the text, but is quoted in the Book of Mormon (Ether 4:18, Mormon 9:22–24).

== Doctrinal anachronisms ==
=== Anti-Universalist rhetoric ===
Universalism, or the doctrine that all humanity would be saved, was a prominent theology that peaked in popularity in the northeastern United States in the 1820s and 1830s. The Book of Mormon contains a number of sermons and passages that use anti-Universalist religious arguments common to that time and place, not known to have occurred in any ancient American setting. The existence of 19th century anti-Universalist arguments and rhetoric in the Book of Mormon has been pointed out as anachronistic by various scholars, including Fawn M. Brodie and Dan Vogel.

=== Satisfaction theory of atonement ===
The satisfaction theory of atonement was a medieval theological development, created to explain how God could be both merciful and just through an infinite atonement, and is not known to have appeared in any ancient American setting.

== See also ==
- Columbian Exchange
- Historicity of the Book of Mormon
- Linguistics and the Book of Mormon
- List of pre-Columbian engineering projects in the Americas
- Pre-Columbian trans-oceanic contact

== Sources ==
- Abanes, Richard (2003). One Nation Under Gods: A History of the Mormon Church. Thunder's Mouth Press. ISBN 978-1-56858-283-2.
- Coe, Michael D. (2002). The Maya (6th ed.). New York: Thames and Hudson. ISBN 978-0-500-28066-9.
- Diamond, Jared (1999). Guns, Germs, and Steel: The Fates of Human Societies. New York: W. W. Norton and Company.
- Roberts, B. H., ed. (1902). History of the Church of Jesus Christ of Latter-day Saints. Vol. 1. Salt Lake City: Deseret News.
- Roberts, B. H. (1992). Madsen, Brigham D. (ed.). Studies of the Book of Mormon (Second ed.). Salt Lake City: Signature Books.
- Smith, Joseph (2002). "History of the Church, Ms. A–1 (LDS Church Archives, Salt Lake City)". In Jessee, Dean C (ed.). Personal Writings of Joseph Smith. Salt Lake City: Deseret Book. ISBN 1-57345-787-6.
- Tanner, Jerald; Tanner, Sandra (1979). The Changing World of Mormonism. Moody Press. ISBN 978-0-8024-1234-8.
- Tanner, Jerald; Tanner, Sandra (1987). Mormonism - Shadow or Reality?. Utah Lighthouse Ministry. ISBN 978-99930-74-43-4.
