= Hypothetical setting of the Book of Mormon =

Various locations have been proposed as the geographical setting of the Book of Mormon, an 1830s work that purports to be a miraculously-delivered record of pre-Columbian America. While some people accept the narrative's historicity as an article of faith, mainstream views hold that the book is a creation of the 19th century, which was dictated, edited, and published by Joseph Smith.

Early readers and believers both concurred that the book's climactic scene, the final battle resulting in the destruction of the Nephites, was set in Palmyra, New York, at a hill Joseph Smith called Cumorah. As early as 1830, some readers felt the book's setting extended to both North and South America. By the 20th century, some followers suggested there were "two Cumorahs", with a second Cumorah located somewhere in Mesoamerica.

The Church of Jesus Christ of Latter-day Saints has no official position on the Book's geographical setting.

== Background ==
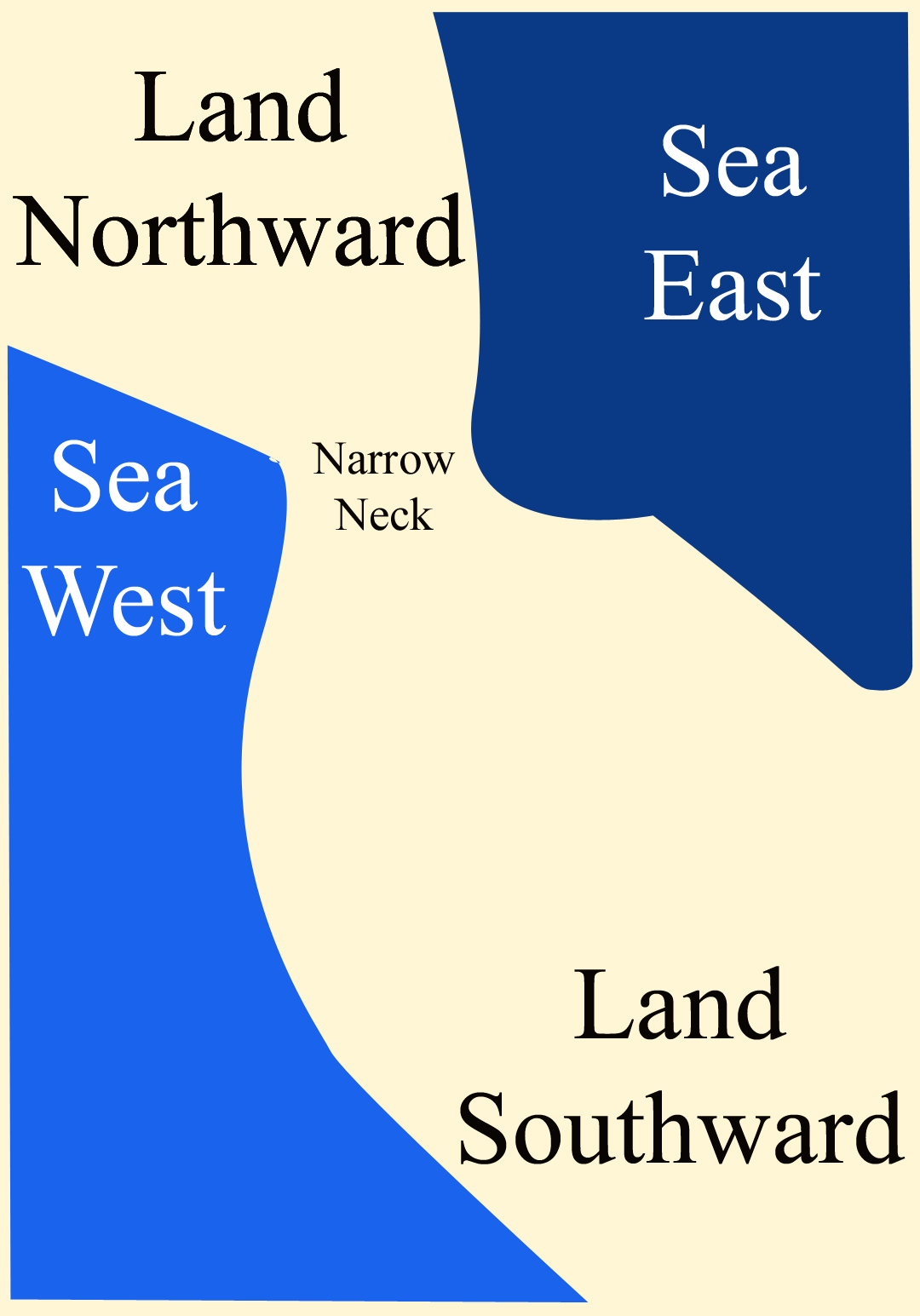
Book of Mormon abstract geography shows a narrow neck of land connecting a southward land to a northward land, surrounded by seas on the east and west.

According to Joseph Smith, an angel named Moroni told him "there was a book deposited, written upon gold plates, giving an account of the former inhabitants of this continent, and the source from whence they sprang." According to Latter Day Saint scripture, the narrative in the Book of Mormon came to an end in the ancient land called Cumorah, where Moroni, in 421 AD, deposited storied golden plates prior to his death. Many believers claim the Cumorah in the Book of Mormon narrative to be the same land containing the modern "Hill Cumorah" near Joseph Smith's home in Palmyra, western New York, from whence the gold plates of the Book of Mormon were retrieved. Others view the modern "Hill Cumorah" to be distinct from the original and simply to have been named after it, thus adding no information to the question of the location of the lands described in the Book of Mormon.

In the Book of Mormon narrative, three groups of people are stated to have migrated: Jaredites, Lehites (later divided into Lamanites and Nephites), and Mulekites. The Jaredites landed in what was later called the "Land Northward" during the time of the building of the "great tower". The Jaredites remained there until being destroyed between 600 and 300 BC. Their land is described as being surrounded by four "seas", with a "Narrow Neck" linking it to a "Land Southward" to which they never ventured except for hunting. The Lehites landed on the coast of a "Land Southward" around 589 BC. Seas nearly surrounded the Land Southward. One sea, which was stated to be near the dividing line of the latter definition of the "Land Southward" from the "Land Northward", was described as the "Sea that Divides the Land". The Mulekites landed in one "Land Northward" around 587 BC and later founded the city "Zarahemla", which was in the heart of the land, along the river "Sidon".

Many other geographic particulars are mentioned by the Book of Mormon, including travel times (generally days or less); lands and some references to their relative locations (for example, Zarahemla is north of the land of Nephi); bodies of water, including an east and a west sea; a narrow strip of wilderness dividing the land of Zarahemla from the southern land of Nephi; and others. Authors of different proposed geographical settings generally attempt to use (at least some of) these particulars when constructing their models.

== Proposed geographies ==
=== Great Lakes setting ===
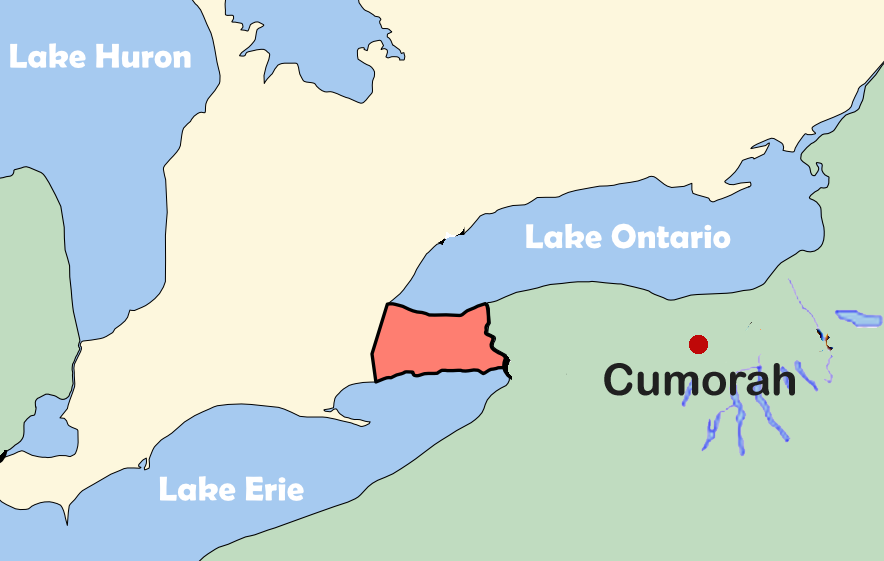
In a Great Lakes setting for the Book of Mormon, the Hill Cumorah is located in Palmyra, New York, near the Niagara Peninsula (red).

Mormons and non-Mormons initially agreed that the Book of Mormon narrative was set in the Great Lakes region, with its final battle at the Hill Cumorah in Palmyra, New York. In the text, Cumorah is situated within the "land of many waters"—in this setting, the Finger Lakes. The Niagara Falls Peninsula has been described as the "narrow neck of land" mentioned in the text.

Great Lakes setting
Book of Mormon Name	Supposed place
Cumorah	Palmyra
"narrow neck of land"	Niagara Peninsula
Sea West	Lake Erie
Sea East	Lake Ontario

The first history of the LDS Church was written in 1834 and 1835 by Oliver Cowdery, a close associate of Smith's, as a series of articles published in the LDS Church's official periodical, the Messenger and Advocate. In his history, Cowdery unambiguously identified the final battle between the Nephites and the Lamanites as having occurred at the "Hill Cumorah" in New York, where Joseph Smith said he obtained golden plates and other artifacts used to translate the Book of Mormon. Cowdery also identified the Jaredites' final battle as occurring in the same area as the Nephite/Lamanite final battle. (Smith edited the Messenger and Advocate and approved the official church history.)

Lucy Mack Smith, Joseph Smith's mother, in her account of the coming forth of the Book of Mormon, says that the divine messenger called the hill where the plates were deposited the "hill of Cumorah", meaning "hill of" the Book of Mormon land "Cumorah". In another account, she said that young Joseph referred to the hill using this description.

By the 1980s, authors noted that several Book of Mormon geographic names are also found within the Great Lakes region, including both indigenous names like Oneida and Tenecum as well as biblical names like Alma, Angola, Boaz, Ephrem, Hellam, Jerusalem, Jordan, Lehigh, Midian, and Rama.

=== Hemispheric setting ===
By 1834, the "narrow neck of land" was being identified with the Isthmus of Panama (then called the Isthmus of Darien).

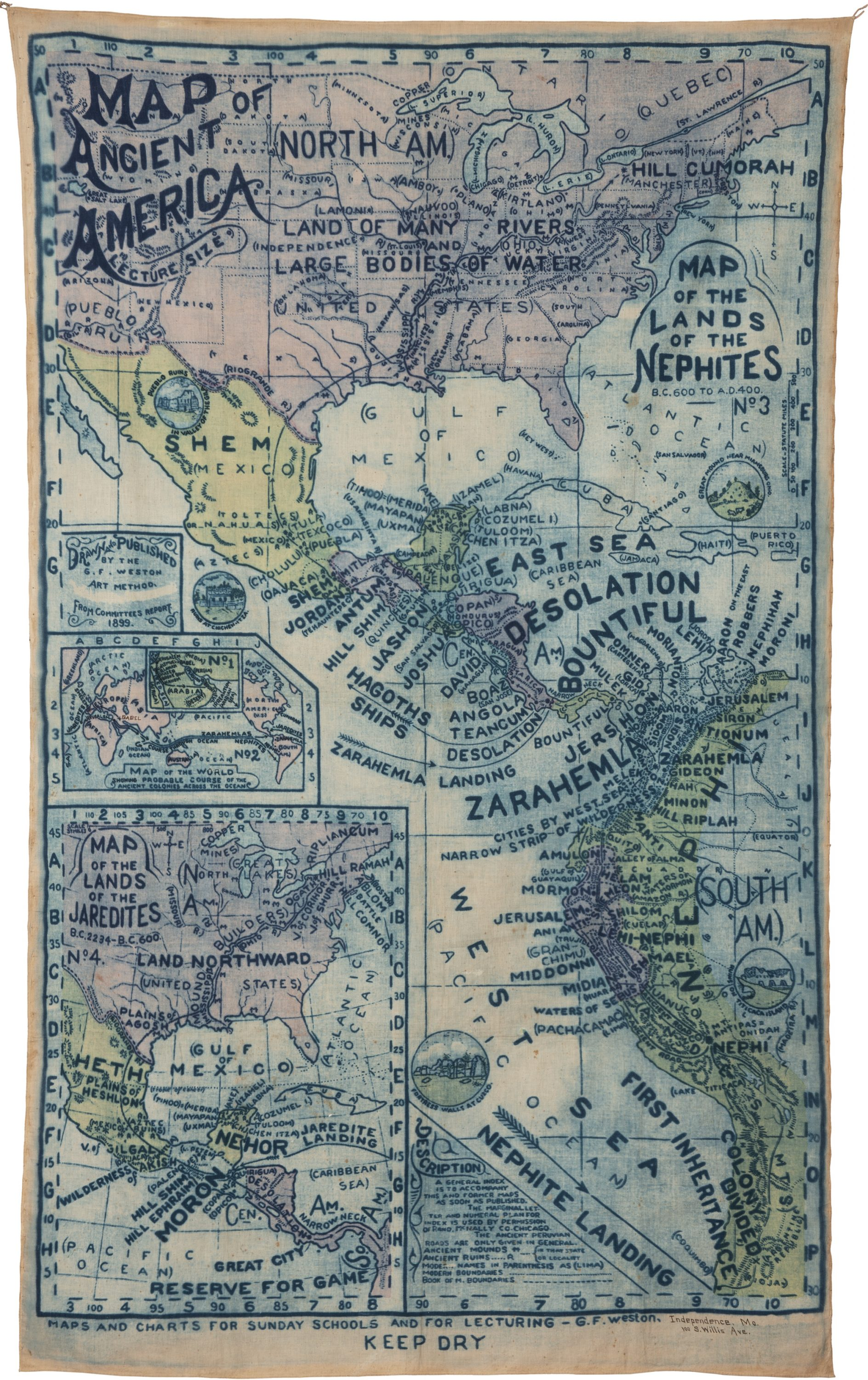
George F. Weston, MAP OF ANCIENT AMERICA [:] LECTURE SIZE. Independence, Missouri: [Herald Publishing House?], 1899. Depicts a hemispheric model of Book of Mormon lands. Image courtesy of Boston Rare Maps.

The "Hemispheric" or "Two-Continent" model proposes that Book of Mormon lands stretch many thousands of miles over much of South and North America. Traditionally, the “narrow neck of land” that divides the “land north” from the “land south”, in this model, is said to be the Isthmus of Darien in Panama.

Statements made by Joseph Smith throughout his life promote a hemispheric view. Additionally, Smith (or in some cases, perhaps his close associates) publicly stated support for Book of Mormon lands in areas as far-flung as the Great Lakes region of North America, Mesoamerica, and Chile in South America. The idea that Lehi landed on the coast of temperate Chile, (Note: Coon notes that Pratt's landing cite at Valparaíso, Chile is essentially the same latitude as proposed in the Williams document (~33 deg. South Latitude). Placing Lehi's landing site as far south of the equator as Jerusalem is north would presumably allow seeds brought from Jerusalem to thrive in the New World. Coon however, challenges the logic of this argument as well as the "extreme" Indian and Pacific Ocean crossing.) thousand of miles south of Panama's narrow neck, and that tropical Colombia's thousand mile long Magdalena River is the River Sidon, were presented by church scholars as mainstream, majority views in the LDS community through the 20th century. Until the late-twentieth century, most adherents of the Latter Day Saint movement who affirmed Book of Mormon historicity believed the people described in the Book of Mormon text were the exclusive ancestors of all indigenous peoples in the Americas.

One of the earliest advocates of a hemispheric setting was Orson Pratt, who as early as 1832 publicly promoted the idea that Lehi "crossed the water into South America". Pratt never attributed his geography (or one like it) to Joseph Smith. Pratt's geographic views were published in the 1879 edition of the Book of Mormon but retracted from later editions.

Strongly influenced by John Lloyd Stephens's 1841 bestseller, Incidents of Travel in Central America, Parley Pratt set various Book of Mormon lands (including, apparently, the narrow neck) farther north and west of Panama. Prior to the influence of John Lloyd Stephens's popular book, some church members placed the southernmost Nephite land of Manti—well within the boundaries of United States territory.

Hemispheric setting
Book of Mormon Name	Supposed place
"narrow neck of land"	Panama
Sea West	Pacific
Sea East	Atlantic

As early as November 1830, Oliver Cowdery openly preached that Lehi landed in Chile. A document in the handwriting of early church leader Frederick G. Williams alleges that Lehi landed 30 degrees South of the equator, in what would be modern day Chile. Although many Latter-day Saints attribute its ideas to Joseph Smith (as Williams was Smith's scribe and counselor), others do not. Some Mormons who support this group of theories believe that part of South America was under water, and that the continent rose up during the major earthquakes mentioned in the Book of Mormon during Jesus's crucifixion in the Old World.

The Encyclopedia of Mormonism states:

Church leaders have generally declined to give any opinion on issues of Book of Mormon geography. When asked to review a map showing the supposed landing place of Lehi's company, President Joseph F. Smith declared that the 'Lord had not yet revealed it' (Cannon, p. 160 n.) In 1929, Anthony W. Ivins, counselor in the First Presidency, added, 'There has never been anything yet set forth that definitely settles that question [of Book of Mormon geography]. ... We are just waiting until we discover the truth" (CR, Apr. 1929, p. 16). While the Church does not currently take an official position with regard to location of geographical places, the authorities do not discourage private efforts to deal with the subject (Cannon).

Previous to this disclaimer, George Q. Cannon had published the following: "It is also known that the landing place of Lehi and his family was near what is now known as the city of Valparaíso, in the republic of Chili [Chile]. The book itself does not give us this information, but there is not doubt of its correctness." President Cannon was promoting a prevailing view endorsed by the Church in 1887. (See for instance Apostle Orson Pratt's speculative geographic footnotes published in the 1879 edition of the Book of Mormon.)

In 1938, Joseph Fielding Smith and his assistants in the Historian's Office of the Church published, as part of a compilation, an article giving readers the impression that Joseph Smith taught that Lehi "had landed a little south of the Isthmus of Darien". The Isthmus of Darien (Panama) is thousands of miles north of Valparaíso, Chile. The popular LDS work quotes an unsigned Times and Seasons article that was published during a "short season" when the official editor of the newspaper (Joseph Smith) was publicly absent. The newspaper article, in fact, mentioned Joseph Smith in the third person and there is no proof that he authored the piece.

Dan Vogel argues Smith likely had a hemispheric setting in mind for the Book for Mormon and was responsible for claims of a Chile landing for Lehi.

=== North American 'Heartland' setting ===
The "Heartland" Model or "Heartland Theory" of Book of Mormon geography states that the Book of Mormon events primarily occurred in the heartland of North America. In this model, the Hill Cumorah in New York is considered to be the hill where Joseph Smith found the Golden Plates, and is the same hill where the civilizations of the Nephites (Cumorah) and the Jaredites (Ramah) fought their last battles. Among its proposals are that Mound Builders, including the Hopewell and the Adena, were among those peoples described in accounts of events in Book of Mormon books such as Alma and Helaman. The ancient city of Zarahemla is believed to be near Montrose, Iowa. The Mississippi River is identified as the River Sidon, and the Springs of Northern Georgia just south of Chattanooga, Tennessee are identified as possibly being the Waters of Mormon. In addition, the Appalachian region of Tennessee is most likely to be the Land of Nephi.

While travelling through Illinois, Joseph Smith claimed to have had a vision of a righteous Lamanite, Zelph, who lived in the area – implicitly situating the American Midwest in the Book of Mormon geography. A few days later, Smith wrote that he and his travelling party were "wandering over the plains of the Nephites, recounting occasionally the history of the Book of Mormon, roving over the mounds of that once beloved people of the Lord, picking up their skulls & their bones, as a proof of its divine authenticity ... During our travels we visited several of the mounds which had been thrown up by the ancient inhabitants of this country-Nephites, Lamanites, etc."

The primary problems with the Heartland theories is the geography is inconsistent with the geologic events described in the Book of Mormon and the reliance on the Adena culture as Jaredites when the Adena culture is known to have started in 500 BC, way too late to be considered Jaredites.

=== Mesoamerican setting and "two Cumorahs" ===
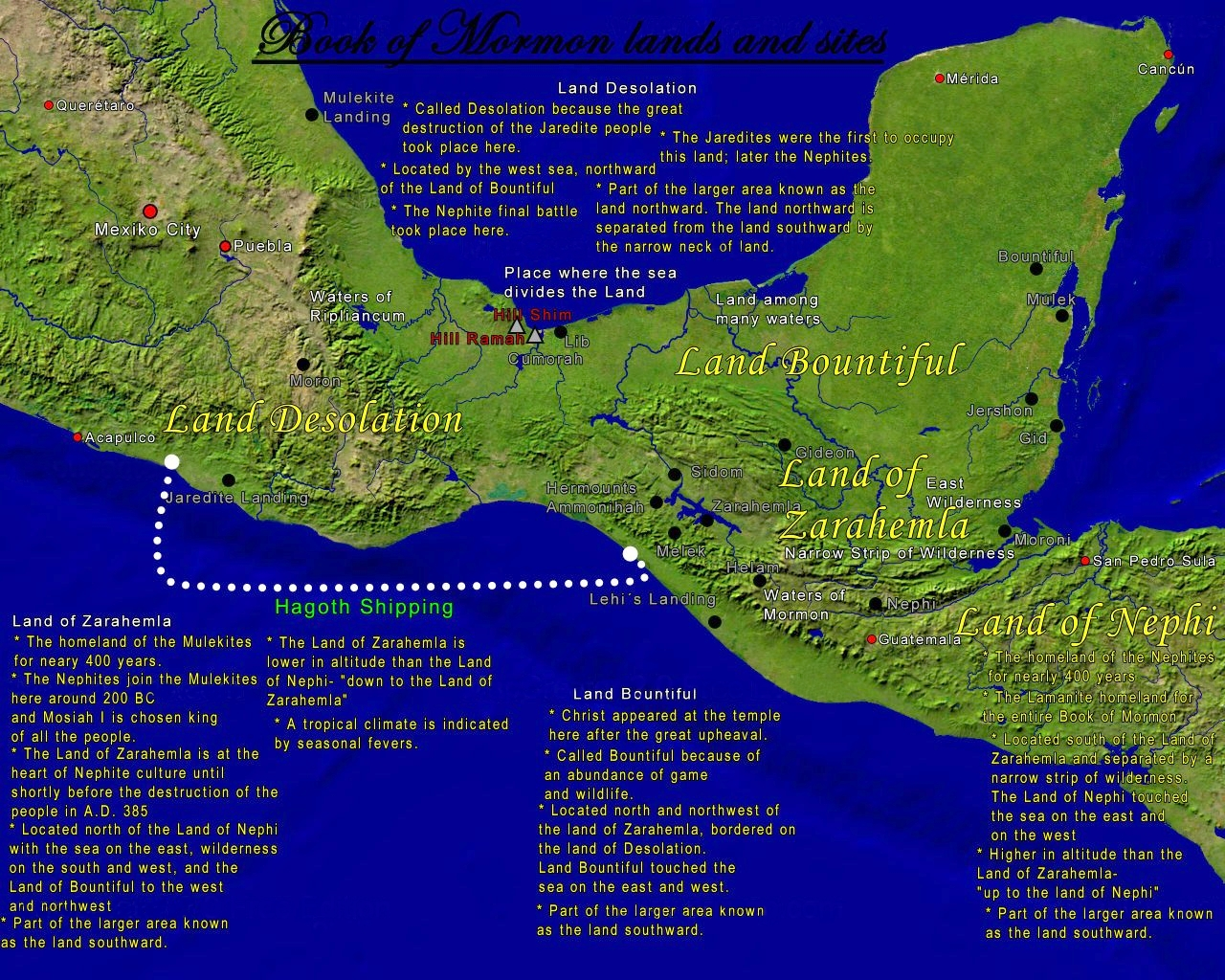
Map of the Limited Geography Model that places the Book of Mormon in a Mesoamerican setting

In 1917, Mormon author Louis Edward Hills argued for a Mesoamerican setting to the book. Many Mormons argue the Book of Mormon is set in Mesoamerica around the Isthmus of Tehuantepec, in the area of current day Guatemala and the southern Mexico States of Tabasco, Chiapas, Oaxaca, Veracruz, and the surrounding area.

Mormon proponents say Tehuantapec model provides enough of a match with existing geography, ancient cultures and ruins, to propose plausible locations for certain Book of Mormon places and events, while other Mormon detractors dispute this view.

On the subject of a Mesoamerican Cumorah, Joseph Fielding Smith said: "This modernist theory of necessity, in order to be consistent, must place the waters of Ripliancum and the Hill Cumorah some place within the restricted territory of Central America, not withstanding the teachings of the Church to the contrary for upwards of 100 years ..." "It is known that the Hill Cumorah where the Nephites were destroyed is the hill where the Jaredites were also destroyed. This hill was known to the Jaredites as Ramah. It was approximately near to the waters of Ripliancum, which the Book of Ether says, 'by interpretation, is large or to exceed all.' ... It must be conceded that this description fits perfectly the land of Cumorah in New York ... for the hill is in the proximity of the Great Lakes, and also in the land of many rivers and fountains ..."

In a 1953 LDS General Conference, leader Mark E. Peterson stated: "I do not believe that there were two Hill Cumorahs, one in Central America, and the other one in New York, for the convenience of the Prophet Joseph Smith, so that the poor boy would not have to walk clear to Central America to get the gold plates."

The "two Cumorahs" theory is considered preposterous by some. Historian and journalist Hampton Sides remarks, "As fantastic as it may seem, [LDS apologist John] Sorenson actually argues that there were two Cumorahs: one in Mexico where the great battle took place, and where Moroni buried a longer, unexpurgated version of the golden Nephite records; and one near Palmyra, New York, where Moroni eventually buried a condensed version of the plates after lugging them on an epic trek of several thousand miles."

== See also ==
- Origin of the Book of Mormon
- Historical authenticity of the Book of Mormon
- Pre-Columbian transoceanic contact theories
- Mound Builders
