= Historicity of the Book of Mormon =

Overview of historical claims of the Book of Mormon

The historicity of the Book of Mormon, the claim that the book is ancient record of historic events, is an article of faith for most members of the Latter Day Saint movement. Non-Mormon sources, in contrast, universally accept that the Book of Mormon is a 19th-century creation, and not an ancient record of pre-Columbian America. Its narrative conflicts with a broad spectrum of archaeological, historical, and scientific evidence regarding plants, animals, civilizations, and technology found in the New World before the Age of Discovery.

== Book of Mormon origin ==
In the early 19th-century United States, settlers encountered the remnants of ancient mounds, or earthenworks. Locals speculated about who had constructed the mounds, how they arrived in the Americas, and their relationship to contemporary indigenous populations. There was a widespread belief that a "lost white race" had been responsible for building the large mounds throughout North America. Some authors also subscribed to the Jewish Indian theory, the idea that Native Americans had originally come from the Middle East.

Joseph Smith, a young folk magic practitioner, reported a vision of treasures buried by ancient Mound Builders near his family home in New York. In subsequent years, Smith claimed he had obtained the treasure, including a set of golden plates containing historical records and artifacts allowing the plates to be miraculously translated. Smith published an English-language volume titled "The Book of Mormon" which purported to be a historic record of the ancient Americas.

The Book of Mormon proposed to answer the questions of the day, explaining the transit of peoples to the Americas as a miraculous ocean voyage and narrating the destruction of mound builders at the hands of dark-skinned Americans. The Book of Mormon claims that shortly after God's miraculous confusion of tongues as punishment for the Tower of Babel, a group called the Jaredites undertook a miraculous transoceanic voyage to the Americas. The book further claims to describe the events in America after the fall of Jerusalem around 600 BC, describing the righteous light-skinned Nephites who ultimately die at the hand of their dark-skinned cousins, the Lamanites. (Note: Archaeology has since concluded the mounds were constructed by a diverse set of ancient Native Americans, not a distinct culture or people.)

Founding a church and becoming its "Prophet, Seer, and Revelator", Smith later began issuing statements he claimed were authored directly by God, without relying on claims of plates or artifacts.

The Book of Mormon adopted the Jewish Indian theory, claiming that Native Americans were descended from the Lamanites: migrants who journeyed from the Middle East to the Americas in 600 BC and were later cursed with dark skin for their wickedness. (Note: In fact, the Americas had been inhabited for at least 15,000 years after migrants arrived from Asia, not the Middle East.) The Book of Mormon implicitly claims the Nephites were responsible for construction of the mounds, before their extermination by the Lamanites.

== Mainstream views ==
Mainstream archaeological, historical, and scientific communities do not consider the Book of Mormon an ancient record of actual historical events. Michael D. Coe, who was an archaeologist and expert on pre-Columbian Mesoamerica, wrote:

I know there is not one professionally trained archaeologist, who is not a Mormon, who sees any scientific justification for believing the foregoing to be true [... .] Nothing, absolutely nothing, has ever shown up in any New World excavation which would suggest to a dispassionate observer that the Book of Mormon, as claimed by Joseph Smith, is a historical document relating to the history of early migrants to our hemisphere.

=== Linguistics ===
There are no widely accepted linguistic connections between any Native American languages and Near Eastern languages, and "the diversity of Native American languages could not have developed from a single origin in the time frame" that would be necessary to validate a hemispheric view of Book of Mormon historicity. The Book of Mormon states it was written in a language called "Reformed Egyptian", clashing with Book of Mormon peoples' purported origin as the descendants of a family from the Kingdom of Judah, where inhabitants would have communicated in Aramaic, not Egyptian. There are no known examples of "Reformed Egyptian," though Coptic has been termed as such by linguists.

The Book of Mormon also includes excerpts from and demonstrates intertextuality with portions of the biblical Book of Isaiah whose widely accepted periods of creation postdate the alleged departure of Lehi's family from Jerusalem circa 600 BC. This would imply the composition of the Book of Mormon occurred after the second and third anonymous authors of the book of Isaiah (called Deutero-Isaiah and Trito-Isaiah, respectively) finished their work during the Babylonian captivity and Second Temple eras of Jewish history. No Latter-day Saint arguments for a unified Isaiah or criticisms of the Deutero-Isaiah and Trito-Isaiah understandings have matched the extent of scholarship supporting later datings for authorship.

The Book of Mormon contains extensive verbatim content taken from the 1769 edition of the King James Bible, even replicating translation errors found in that specific edition.

=== Archaeology ===
The Book of Mormon mentions multiple animals, plants, and technologies that did not exist in the pre-Columbian Americas. These include asses, cattle, horses, oxen, sheep, swine, goats, elephants, wheat, barley, silk, steel, brass, breast plates, chains, iron working, (Note: While iron ores such as haematite were mined (rather rarely), they were used as coloring. The metal was not extracted.) plows, swords, scimitars, and chariots.

There is no accepted correlation between locations described in the Book of Mormon and known American archaeological sites. Mesoamerica is the preferred setting for the Book of Mormon among many apologists who advocate a non-hemispheric setting for Book of Mormon events. However, there is no evidence accepted by non-Mormons in Mesoamerican societies of cultural influence from anything described in the Book of Mormon.

While Smith and the Book of Mormon hold that Cumorah was a human-made mound, the hill is actually a naturally occurring glacial drumlin. Though the book claims Cumorah was the site of a battle with 200,000 deaths, there is no evidence that the hill was ever a settlement, fortification, or battle site.

=== Genetics ===
Until the late-twentieth century, most adherents of the Latter Day Saint movement who affirmed Book of Mormon historicity believed the people described in the Book of Mormon text were the exclusive ancestors of all Indigenous peoples in the Americas. DNA evidence proved that to be impossible, as no DNA evidence links any Native American group to ancestry from the ancient Near East as a belief in Book of Mormon peoples as the exclusive ancestors of Indigenous Americans would require. Instead, detailed genetic research indicates that Indigenous Americans' ancestry traces back to east Asia, and reveals numerous details about the movements and settlements of ancient Americans which are either lacking in, or contradicted by, the Book of Mormon narrative. (Note: The first settlers in the Americas were Paleolithic hunter-gatherers (Paleo-Indians) who entered North America from the North Asian Mammoth steppe via the Beringia land bridge, which had formed between northeastern Siberia and western Alaska due to the lowering of sea level during the Last Glacial Maximum. These populations expanded south of the Laurentide Ice Sheet and spread rapidly southward, occupying both North and South America, by 12,000 to 14,000 years ago. Indigenous peoples of the Americas have been linked to Siberian populations by genetic composition as reflected by molecular data, such as DNA. Analyses of genetics among Indigenous American and Siberian populations have been used to argue for early isolation of founding populations on Beringia and for later, more rapid migration from Siberia through Beringia into the New World. The microsatellite diversity and distributions of the Y lineage specific to South America indicates that certain Indigenous American populations have been isolated since the initial peopling of the region. The Na-Dene, Inuit and Native Alaskan populations exhibit Haplogroup Q-M242; however, they are distinct from other Indigenous Americans with various mtDNA and atDNA mutations. This suggests that the peoples who first settled in the northern extremes of North America and Greenland derived from later migrant populations than those who penetrated farther south in the Americas.)

== Latter Day Saint views ==
=== As historic ===
The dominant and widely accepted view in the Latter Day Saint movement is that the Book of Mormon is a true and accurate account of these ancient American civilizations whose religious history it documents. Joseph Smith, whom most Latter Day Saints believe to have translated the work, stated, "I told the brethren that the Book of Mormon was the most correct of any book on earth, and the keystone of our religion, and a man would get nearer to God by abiding by its precepts, than by any other book."

The Gospel Topics essays section of the official website of the Church of Jesus Christ of Latter-day Saints (LDS Church), the largest denomination in the movement, has two essays entitled "Book of Mormon and DNA Studies" and "Book of Mormon Translation". In them, the church affirms the literal historicity of the Book of Mormon. In the essay on DNA studies, the church argues for "a more careful approach to the data," and states that

The conclusions of genetics, like those of any science, are tentative, and much work remains to be done to fully understand the origins of the native populations of the Americas. Nothing is known about the DNA of Book of Mormon peoples, and even if their genetic profile were known, there are sound scientific reasons that it might remain undetected.

Meanwhile, in the essay on the Book of Mormon's translation, the church affirms that "the Book of Mormon came into the world through a series of miraculous events."

=== As inspired creation ===
Unresolved issues of the book's historicity and the lack of supporting archaeological evidence have led some adherents to adopt the position that the Book of Mormon may have been Smith's creation, but it was nevertheless divinely inspired. Between these two views is the view held by some Latter Day Saints that the Book of Mormon is a divine work of a spiritual nature, written in ancient America, but that its purpose is to teach of Christ and not to be used as a guide for history, geology, archaeology, or anthropology.

In 1955, Thomas Stuart Ferguson, an attorney and a Latter-day Saint and the founder of the New World Archaeological Foundation (NWAF), with five years of funding from the LDS Church, began to dig throughout Mesoamerica for evidence of the veracity of the Book of Mormon claims. In a 1961 newsletter, Ferguson predicted that although nothing had been found, the Book of Mormon cities would be found within ten years. In 1972, Christian scholar Hal Hougey wrote to Ferguson questioning the progress made, given the stated timetable in which the cities would be found. Replying to Hougey as well as secular and non-secular requests, Ferguson wrote in a letter dated June 5, 1972: "Ten years have passed . ... I had sincerely hoped that Book-of-Mormon cities would be positively identified within 10 years—and time has proved me wrong in my anticipation."

In 1969, NWAF colleague Dee Green stated, "Just how much the foundation is doing to advance the cause of Book of Mormon archaeology depends on one's point of view about Book of Mormon archaeology." After this article and another six years of fruitless search, Ferguson published a paper in which he concluded, "I'm afraid that up to this point, I must agree with Dee Green, who has told us that to date there is no Book-of-Mormon geography". Referring to his own paper, Ferguson wrote a 1976 letter in which he stated: "The real implication of the paper is that you can't set the Book-of-Mormon geography down anywhere—because it is fictional and will never meet the requirements of the dirt-archeology. I should say—what is in the ground will never conform to what is in the book."

== See also ==
- Anachronisms in the Book of Mormon
- Hypothetical setting of the Book of Mormon
- Origin of the Book of Mormon
- Peopling of the Americas
- Proposed Book of Mormon geographical setting
- Pre-Columbian transoceanic contact theories
- Reformed Egyptian
