= Martin H. Harris =

Mormon pioneer

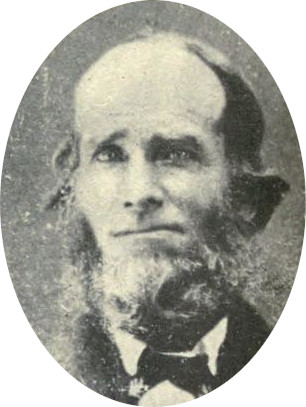
- Born: September 29, 1820; Wyoming County, Pennsylvania
- Died: February 14, 1889 (aged 68); Harrisville, Utah
- Known for: Early settler of Harrisville, Utah

Martin Henderson Harris (September 29, 1820 – February 14, 1889) was a Mormon pioneer, LDS Church leader, early Utah horticulturalist, and early colonizer of Harrisville, Utah (for whom the community was named) and Fort Lemhi, Idaho.

== Biography ==
Born near Mehoopany, Wyoming County, Pennsylvania, Harris was the son of Emer Harris and Deborah Lott. He was a nephew of Martin Harris, one of the Three Witnesses to the Book of Mormon, and a descendant of Thomas Harris, companion in exile of Roger Williams, and one of the founders of Providence, Rhode Island. Harris was baptized a member of the Church of Jesus Christ of Latter Day Saints in September 1842, by Milton Stow, near Nauvoo, Illinois. Harris served as a guard in Nauvoo to protect Joseph Smith against mob violence. He also served in the Nauvoo Legion and witnessed the laying of the cornerstone of the Nauvoo Temple. After being driven with other Latter-day Saints from Nauvoo in 1846, he resided temporarily in St. Louis, Missouri, until 1850, when he went to Kanesville, Iowa, and then to Utah.

In 1851 Harris commenced farming at what is now Harrisville, where he built a house and fenced some land, his being the first house west of Four Mile Creek, and the only house which remained standing in that neighborhood during the "Move South", in consequence of which the ward, when organized some years afterwards, was named after him.

Harris served as president of the first Latter-day Saint co-operative store in Ogden. He also served as road commissioner of Weber County for 11 years and assisted in locating most of the highways of that county. Harris was ordained a Seventy on September 5, 1853, by Luman A. Shurtliff, and was secretary for many years of the 38th Quorum of Seventies. Harris was the first missionary called from the district to the Salmon River Mission, and during "The Move" in 1858 he went South. He was also fifer in the first military band of Weber County.

In the summer of 1863, Harris was appointed presiding Elder of the Eighth ecclesiastical district (later Harrisville). When the so-called Eighth District was organized with a president November 15, 1863, he was set apart as first counselor to Luman A. Shurtliff. He taught the first school in the Harrisville district in his own house without pay, and acted as the first superintendent of the district Sunday school that was organized in May 1865, a position he held until September 13, 1868. He acted as district or ward clerk for many years and culled data from private records and other sources in compiling the Harrisville Ward history for 25 years, beginning with 1850.

Harris became known as an experimental horticulturist and planted many trees from other parts of the United States which were thought at the time to be inhospitable to Utah's climate. Some hardwood trees which Harris planted in 1876 in honor of America's Centennial remain standing. In 1976, the nation's bicentennial year, the city of Harrisville bought property originally owned by Harris for the Martin Henderson Harris Memorial Park.

In 1877 Harris was called to serve a one-year mission to the Eastern states. On account of sickness he returned, and never fully recovered. Harris died February 14, 1889, of palsy at Harrisville, and was buried in the Ogden City Cemetery.

A monument in Harris's honor was erected by descendants and Harrisville citizens on September 27, 1955, on the 105th anniversary of his arrival in Weber County.

== Family ==
Harris married Georgiana Maria Aldous January 18, 1855; she died October 30, 1858, leaving a son Emer, born August 6, 1856. Harris next married Louisa Sargent, a survivor of the Saluda (steamship) accident, on April 3, 1859. They had six children, including Nathan J. Harris, an early Utah district judge.
