= Harrisville, Utah =

City in Utah, United States

- City
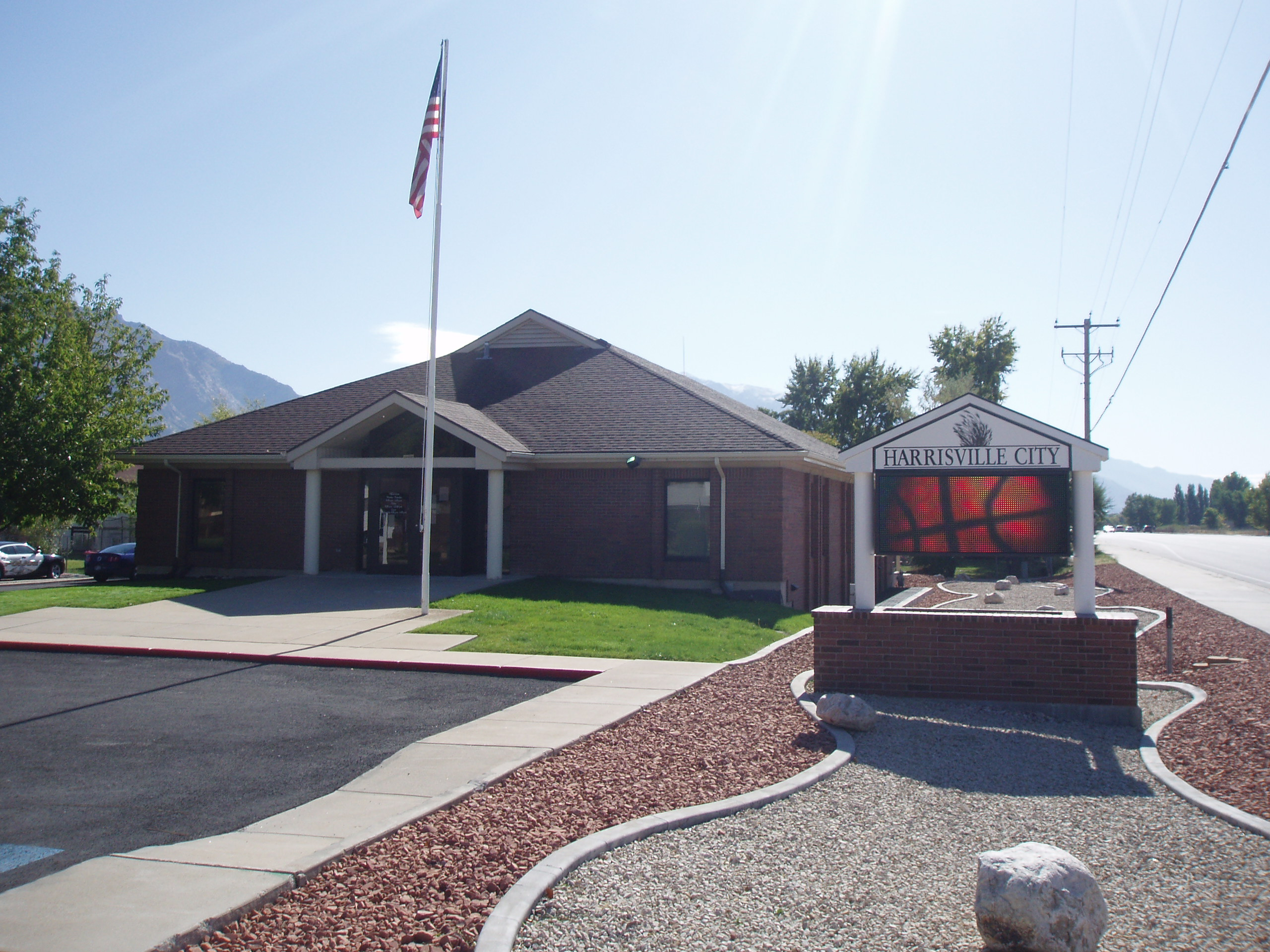
- Harrisville City Hall, October 2011

- Location within Weber County and the State of Utah
- Coordinates: 41°17′12″N 111°59′42″W
- Country: United States
- State: Utah
- County: Weber
- Settled: 1850
- Founder: Urban Stewart
- Named for: Martin H. Harris

Area
  - Total: 2.98 sq mi (7.73 km^{2})
  - Land: 2.98 sq mi (7.73 km^{2})
  - Water: 0 sq mi (0.00 km^{2})
- Elevation: 4,308 ft (1,313 m)

Population (2020)
  - Total: 7,036
  - Density: 2,302.7/sq mi (889.06/km^{2})
- Time zone: UTC-7 (Mountain (MST))
  - Summer (DST): UTC-6 (MDT)
- ZIP code: 84404
- Area codes: 385, 801
- FIPS code: 49-33540
- GNIS feature ID: 2410709
- Website: harrisvillecity.gov

Harrisville is a city in Weber County, Utah, United States. The population was 7,036 at the 2020 census. It is part of the Ogden–Clearfield, Utah Metropolitan Statistical Area.

== History ==
The first permanent settlement at Harrisville was made in 1850. A post office called Harrisville was established in 1871, and remained in operation until 1902. The community was named after Martin H. Harris, a pioneer settler.

== Geography ==
According to the United States Census Bureau, the city has a total area of 2.7 square miles (7.0 km^{2}), all land.

== Demographics ==
Historical population
Census	Pop.	Note	%±
1880	582		—
1890	715		22.9%
1900	319		−55.4%
1910	396		24.1%
1920	488		23.2%
1930	509		4.3%
1940	572		12.4%
1950	761		33.0%
1970	749		—
1980	1,371		83.0%
1990	3,004		119.1%
2000	3,645		21.3%
2010	5,567		52.7%
2020	7,036		26.4%
2023 (est.)	6,802		−3.3%
U.S. Decennial Census

=== 2020 census ===
As of the 2020 census, Harrisville had a population of 7,036. The median age was 31.4 years. 30.6% of residents were under the age of 18 and 9.5% of residents were 65 years of age or older. For every 100 females there were 95.1 males, and for every 100 females age 18 and over there were 92.2 males age 18 and over.

100.0% of residents lived in urban areas, while 0.0% lived in rural areas.

There were 2,370 households in Harrisville, of which 45.9% had children under the age of 18 living in them. Of all households, 59.3% were married-couple households, 13.8% were households with a male householder and no spouse or partner present, and 21.8% were households with a female householder and no spouse or partner present. About 16.9% of all households were made up of individuals and 5.7% had someone living alone who was 65 years of age or older.

There were 2,425 housing units, of which 2.3% were vacant. The homeowner vacancy rate was 0.8% and the rental vacancy rate was 1.7%.

Racial composition as of the 2020 census
Race	Number	Percent
White	5,929	84.3%
Black or African American	33	0.5%
American Indian and Alaska Native	41	0.6%
Asian	107	1.5%
Native Hawaiian and Other Pacific Islander	23	0.3%
Some other race	371	5.3%
Two or more races	532	7.6%
Hispanic or Latino (of any race)	871	12.4%

=== 2000 census ===
As of the census of 2000, there were 3,645 people, 1,010 households, and 884 families residing in the city. The population density was 1,347.6 people per square mile (521.2/km^{2}). There were 1,036 housing units at an average density of 383.0 per square mile (148.1/km^{2}). The racial makeup of the city was 93.77% White, 0.41% African American, 0.41% Native American, 1.15% Asian, 0.36% Pacific Islander, 2.33% from other races, and 1.56% from two or more races. Hispanic or Latino of any race were 4.66% of the population.

There were 1,010 households, out of which 58.5% had children under 18 living with them, 77.5% were married couples living together, 7.4% had a female householder with no husband present, and 12.4% were non-families. 10.3% of all households were made up of individuals, and 3.3% had someone living alone who was 65 years of age or older. The average household size was 3.61, and the average family size was 3.89.

In the city, the population was spread out, with 39.3% under 18, 10.2% from 18 to 24, 30.5% from 25 to 44, 15.5% from 45 to 64, and 4.5% who were 65 years of age or older. The median age was 26 years. For every 100 females, there were 102.4 males. For every 100 females aged 18 and over, there were 100.9 males.

The median income for a household in the city was $51,289, and the median income for a family was $53,396. Males had a median income of $38,287 versus $29,239 for females. The per capita income was $16,293. About 2.6% of families and 3.6% of the population were below the poverty line, including 5.2% of those under age 18 and 3.8% of those aged 65 or over.

== Federal Representation ==
Harrisville is located in Utah's First Congressional District For the 118th United States Congress, Utah's First Congressional District is represented by Blake Moore (R Salt Lake City)

== See also ==
- List of cities and towns in Utah
