= List of pre-Columbian engineering projects in the Americas =

Engineering in the Americas before the arrival of Christopher Columbus was advanced in agriculture, hydrology, irrigation systems, transportation, mechanical engineering, civil engineering and astronomy. In addition Native Americans made extensive use of fire to change the landscape and to create open areas for farming and hunting. Examples of pre-Columbian engineering from different indigenous civilizations can be found across North and South America.

== North America ==
- Pueblo Structures
- Hohokam Canals
- Chaco Canyon
- Tenochitlan Flood Gates
- Teotihuacan
- Serpent Mound
- Cahokia Mounds

== South America ==
- Inca road system
- Nazca Lines
- Machu Picchu
- Sacsayhuaman
- Chavin/Inca canals
- Tiwanaku
- Chan Chan
- Anden
- Zenu canals and drains

== See also ==
- Inca Empire
- Incan agriculture
- Kuelap
- Paracas culture
- Nazca culture
- Caral
