= Reformed Egyptian =

Purported script from which the Book of Mormon was translated

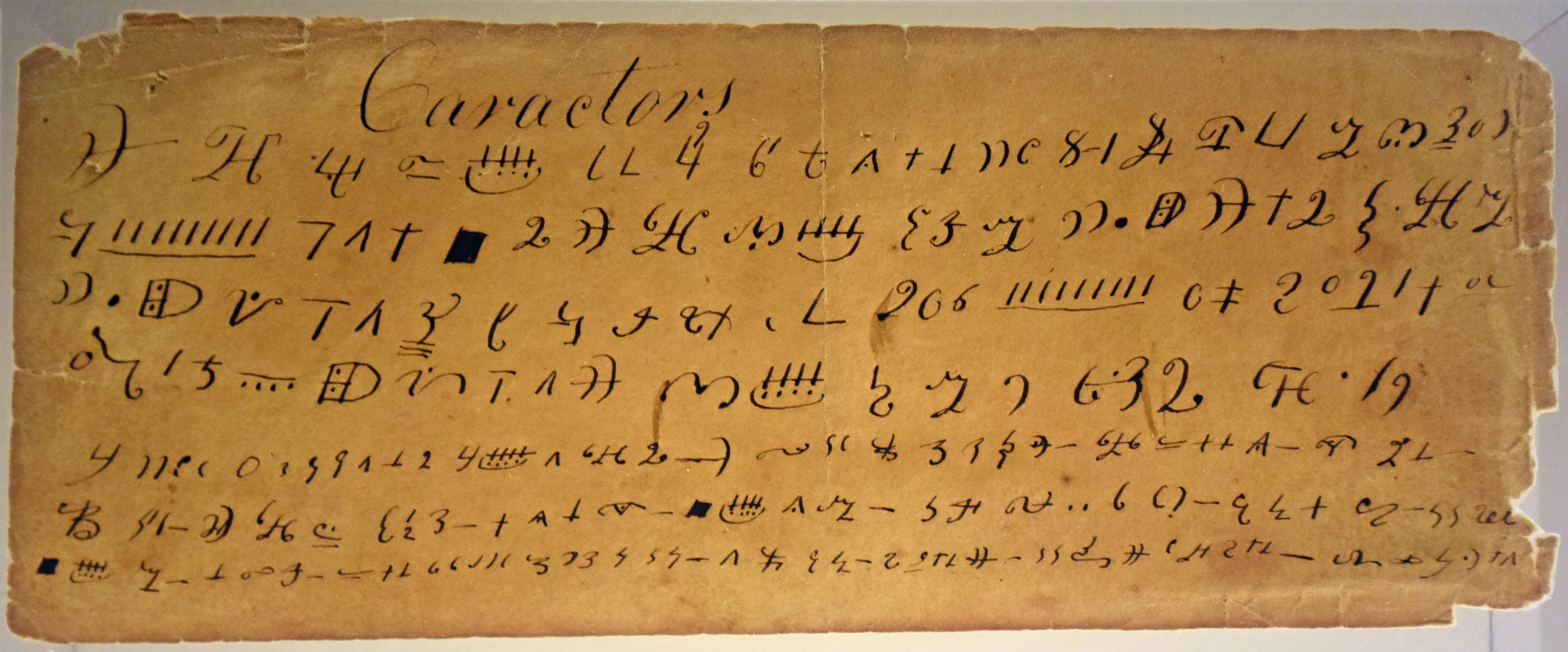
Photograph of the "Caractors" document

Reformed Egyptian is a language claimed to exist by Joseph Smith, the founder of the Latter Day Saint movement, which the movement's holy text, the Book of Mormon, was supposedly originally written in.

Scholarly reference works on languages do not acknowledge the existence of either a "reformed Egyptian" language or "reformed Egyptian" script as it was described by Joseph Smith. There is no archaeological, linguistic, or other evidence of the use of Egyptian writing in the ancient Americas.

== Reformed Egyptian and the Book of Mormon ==
The Book of Mormon uses the term "reformed Egyptian" in Mormon 9:32 which says that "the characters which are called among us the reformed Egyptian, [were] handed down and altered by us, according to our manner of speech" and that "none other people knoweth our language" (Mormon 9:32-34). The book also says that its first author, Nephi, used the "learning of the Jews and the language of the Egyptians" (1 Nephi 1:2) to write his record which constitutes the first two books of the Book of Mormon. The abridgment that the Book of Mormon says was prepared by Mormon and Moroni nearly a thousand years later in approximately 380 AD, containing most of the balance of the book, was said to have been written in "reformed Egyptian" because it supposedly took up less space than Hebrew.

Latter-day Saint apologists contend that reformed Egyptian is a form of Egyptian writing similar to other modified Egyptian scripts such as hieratic, a handwritten form of hieroglyphics thousands of years old by the first millennium BC, or early Demotic, a simplified derivative of hieratic, which was used in northern Egypt.

According to believers, Smith translated reformed Egyptian characters engraved on gold plates into English through various means, including the use of a seer stone or the interpreter stones, or both. Smith said when he had finished the translation, he returned the plates to the angel Moroni and as such they were unavailable for study, meaning all examples of the script are due solely to Smith and his associates' transcriptions.

== The "Anthon Transcript" ==
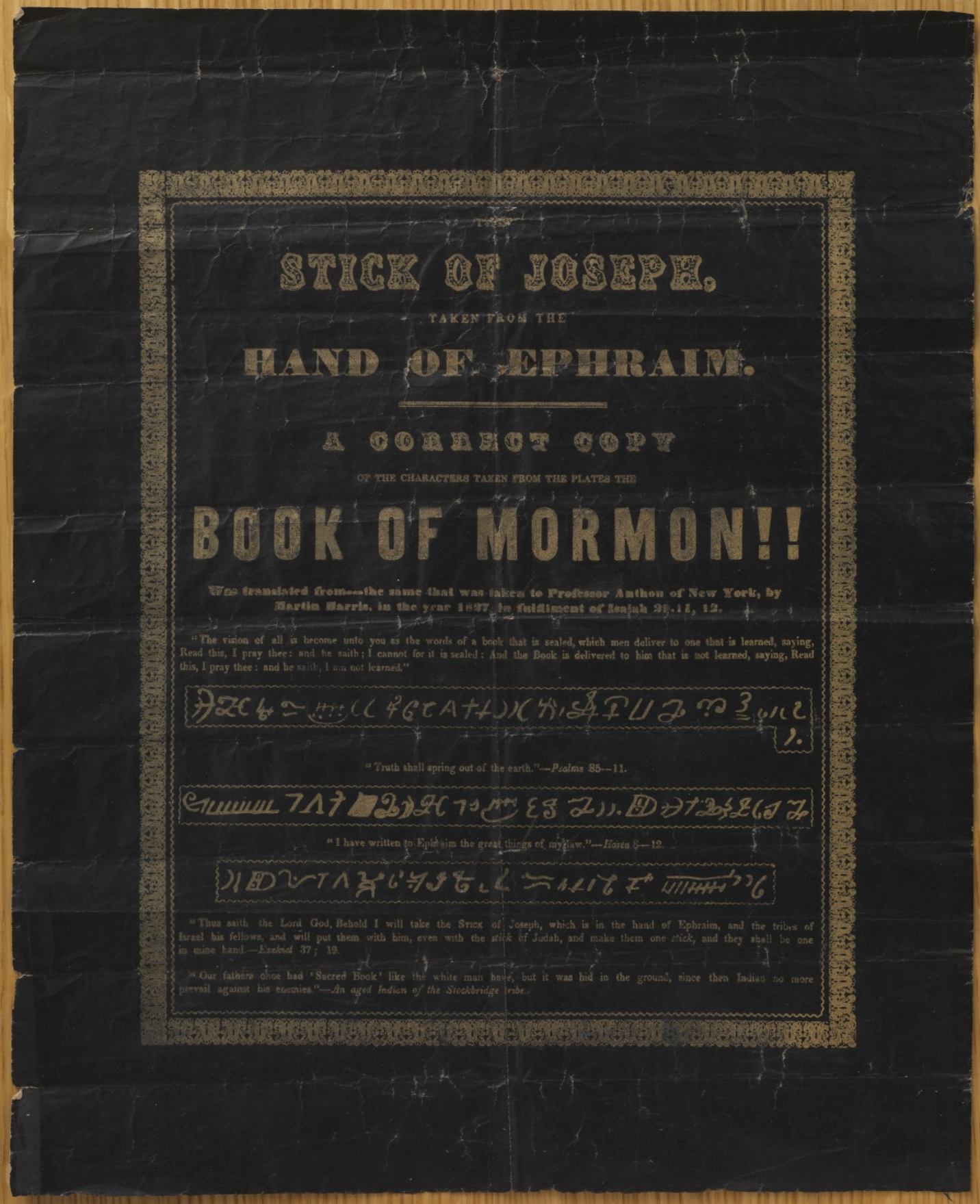
1844 broadside with reformed Egyptian characters, "the same that was taken to Professor Anthon of New York, by Martin Harris, in the year 1827."

The "Anthon Transcript" is a piece of paper on which Joseph Smith said he transcribed reformed Egyptian characters from the golden plates—the ancient record from which Smith claimed to have translated the Book of Mormon. A manuscript known as the "Caractors" document was previously thought to be this transcript. However, handwriting analysis suggests the document was most likely written by John Whitmer, one of the Eight Witnesses. This handwriting analysis casts doubt on the idea that "Caractors" document was the Anthon Transcript because John Whitmer was not affiliated with the Church until June 1829, while the Anthon Transcript was taken to New York in the winter of 1828.

Smith said that when this sample was presented by Smith's colleague Martin Harris to Columbia College professor Charles Anthon, a noted classical scholar, that Anthon had attested to the characters' authenticity in writing but had then ripped up his certification after hearing that the plates had been revealed by an angel. Anthon wrote, to the contrary, that he had believed from the first that Harris was the victim of fraud.

In 1844, Church of Jesus Christ of Latter Day Saints published a broadside about the Book of Mormon called "The Stick of Joseph" that reprinted some "reformed Egyptian" characters that resemble those on the first three lines of the "Caractors" document. The broadside said that the characters were those that had been shown to Anthon. However, it is unlikely that the characters on the broadside came directly from the "Caractors" document because Whitmer was excommunicated in 1838 and took his papers with him.

== Scholarly view of reformed Egyptian ==
Standard language reference works contain no reference to "reformed Egyptian" and it is described with this term only in the Book of Mormon. No non-Mormon scholars acknowledge the existence of either a "reformed Egyptian" language or a "reformed Egyptian" script as it has been described in Mormon belief. For instance, in 1966, John A. Wilson, professor of Egyptology at the University of Chicago, wrote, "From time to time there are allegations that picture writing has been found in America [...] In no case has a professional Egyptologist been able to recognize these characters as Egyptian hieroglyphs. From our standpoint there is no such language as 'reformed Egyptian'." Anthropologist Michael D. Coe of Yale University, an expert in pre-Columbian Mesoamerican studies, wrote, "Of all the peoples of the pre-Columbian New World, only the ancient Maya had a complete script." Fifteen examples of distinct writing systems have been identified in pre-Columbian Mesoamerica, many from a single inscription.

[...] and no non-Mormon linguists have recognized any direct contact between New World and Old World languages.

— Grant Hardy (2023)

== Mormon studies of reformed Egyptian ==
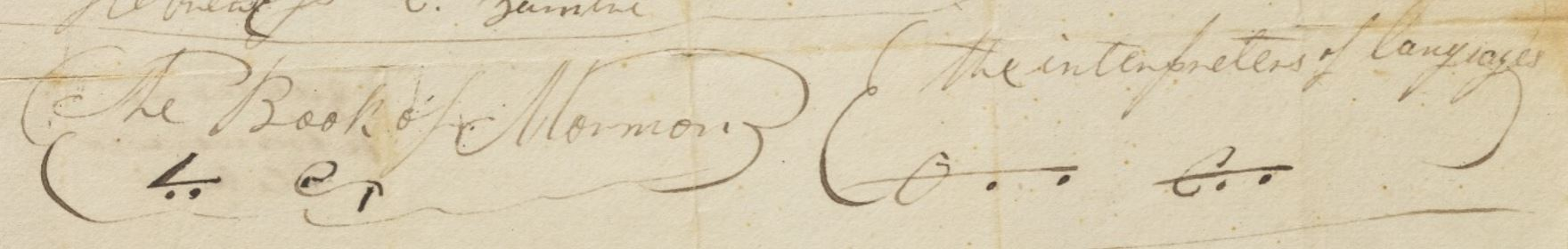
Reformed Egyptian characters copied by Joseph Smith's scribe, Oliver Cowdery, written in the early 1830s

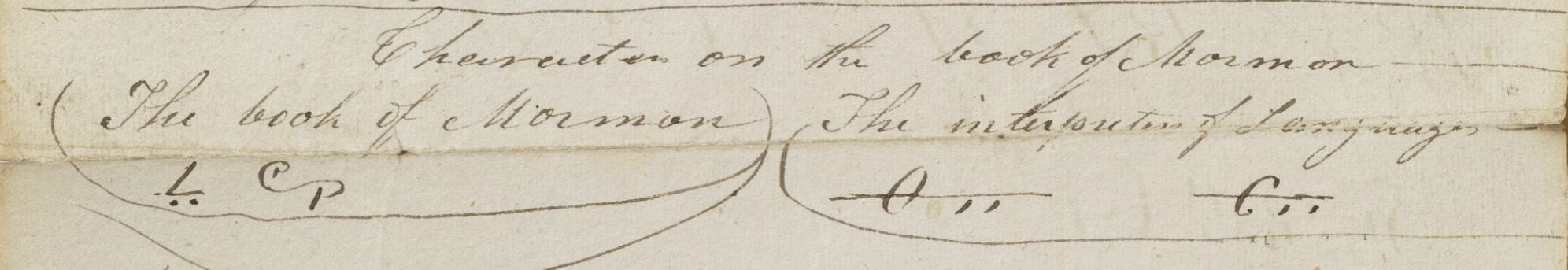
Reformed Egyptian characters copied by Joseph Smith's scribe, Frederick G. Williams

Since no outside evidence exists, Mormon studies of reformed Egyptian are limited to whatever linguistic evidence can be obtained from the text of the Book of Mormon plus the extant seven-line "Caractors" document believed by some to be the symbols copied from the gold plates. Four Mormon non-linguist translators with varying levels of education have attempted to decipher the "Caractors" document. According to Brigham Young University Egyptologist John Gee, "the corpus is not large enough to render decipherment feasible."

== See also ==
- Anthon Transcript forgery
- Book of Abraham
