= Mormonism in the 20th century =

This is a timeline of major events in Mormonism in the 20th century.

== 1900s ==
=== 1900 ===
- January 25: The U.S. Congress votes to not admit B. H. Roberts, who had been denied a seat since being elected in 1898, because of his practice of polygamy.
- April 19: Reed Smoot is ordained an apostle.

=== 1901 ===
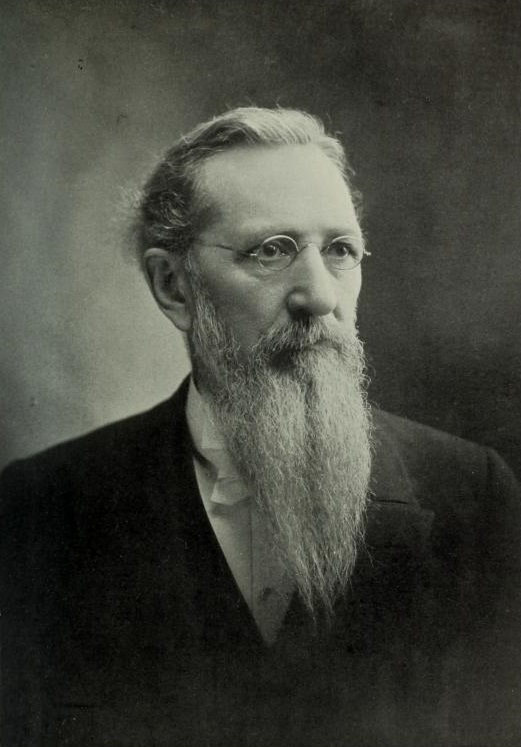
Joseph F. Smith became LDS Church president.

- April 10: The Daughters of Utah Pioneers organization is founded.
- September 1: Japan is dedicated by Heber J. Grant for missionary proselyting.
- October 10: Lorenzo Snow dies.
- October 17: Joseph F. Smith becomes the sixth president of the LDS Church.

=== 1902 ===
- January: The first issue of The Children's Friend is published, a magazine for LDS primary children.
- August 4: The Bureau of Information opens on Temple Square, the first visitors' center of the LDS Church.
- September 20: The first volume of the History of the Church is published, edited by B. H. Roberts and covering Joseph Smith's life from 1805 to 1833.
- October: A new edition of the Pearl of Great Price is approved, as prepared by James E. Talmage, who introduced chapters and verses and removed material duplicated in the Doctrine and Covenants.

=== 1903 ===
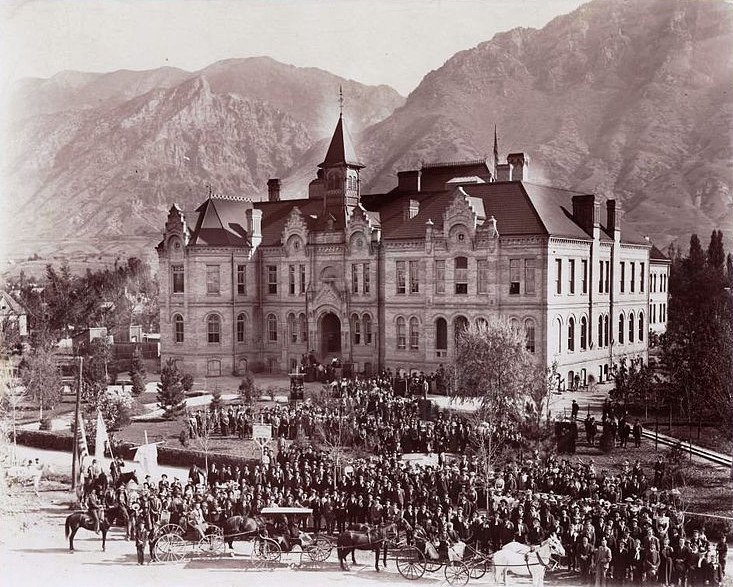
Brigham Young Academy building

- January: Reed Smoot, an apostle, is elected by the state legislature to the 58th congress as a U.S. Senator. Controversy over his election arises immediately.
- February: Despite allegations and controversy, Reed Smoot is allowed to be seated in the Senate.
- March: Reed Smoot takes the senatorial oath and formally becomes a member of the senate.
- October 15: Brigham Young Academy becomes Brigham Young University.
- November 5: The LDS Church acquires Carthage Jail, to be used as a historic site.
- Samoan edition of the Book of Mormon.

=== 1904 ===
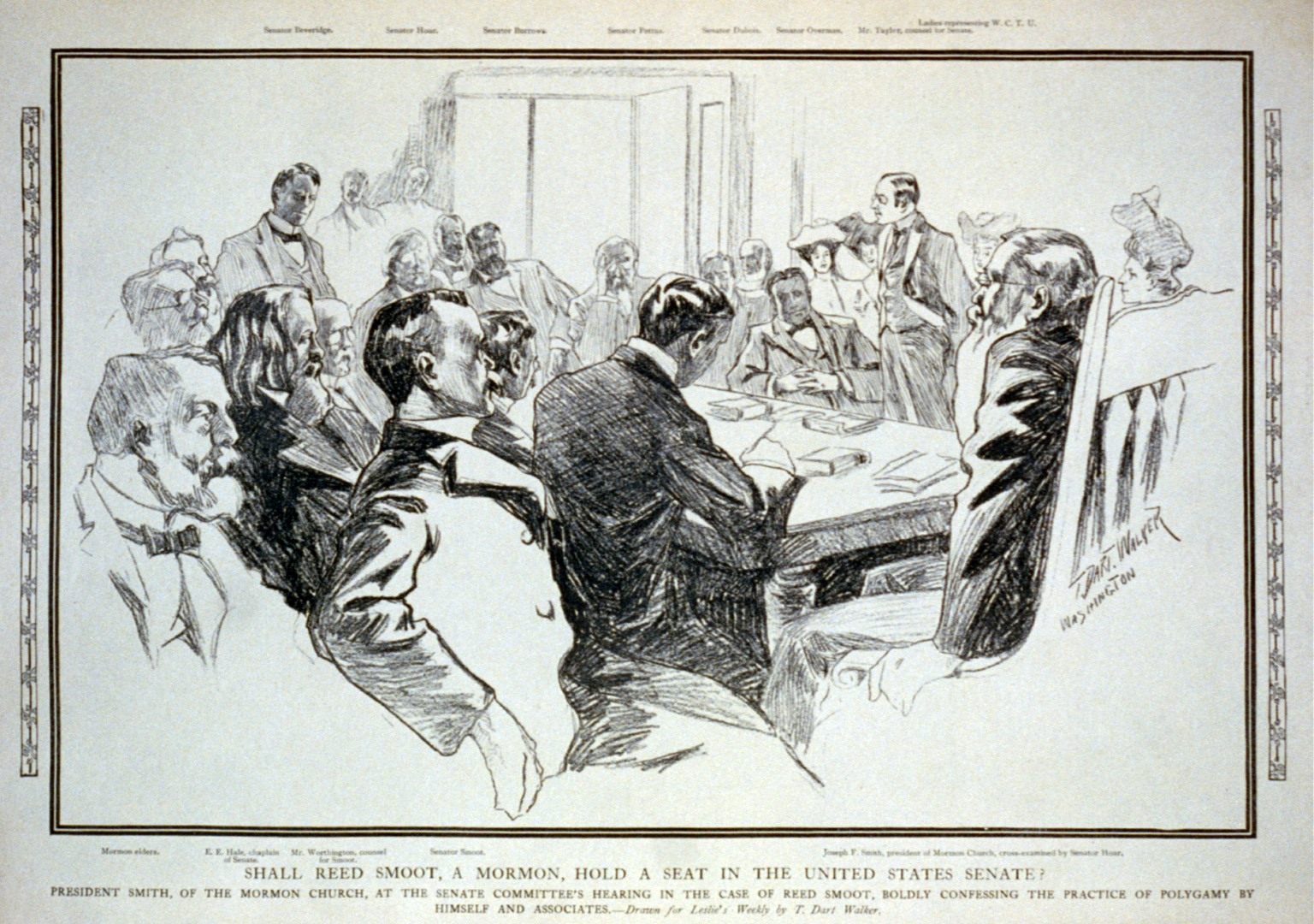
LDS Church president Joseph F. Smith testified before congress at the Reed Smoot Hearings.

- January – Reed Smoot submits carefully prepared rebuttals to allegations against him and his church.
- March – The Reed Smoot Hearings begin, evaluating whether Reed Smoot should be allowed to be a senator.
- April 6 – Joseph F. Smith issues the "Second Manifesto", which reinforces the 1890 Manifesto and prescribes excommunication for those who continued to practice plural marriage.
- April 14 - The LDS Church purchases 25 acres in Independence, Missouri, originally part of the 63-acre Temple Lot from 1831. Church leaders intended this to be the site for a temple in Zion, fulfilling a prophecy of Joseph Smith.

=== 1905 ===
- January 1: Latter-day Saint Hospital is opened.
- April: John W. Taylor resigns from the Quorum of the Twelve Apostles due to disagreements with church policy regarding polygamy.
- October 28: Matthias F. Cowley follows John W. Taylor and resigns from the Quorum of the Twelve Apostles due to disagreements with church policy regarding polygamy.
- December 23: Joseph Smith Birthplace Memorial near Sharon, Vermont is dedicated by Joseph F. Smith.

=== 1906 ===
- Summer: Joseph F. Smith visits Europe, the first President of the Church to do so.
- The first Sunday School classes for adults are held.
- Turkish edition of Book of Mormon; first in an Asian language.

=== 1907 ===
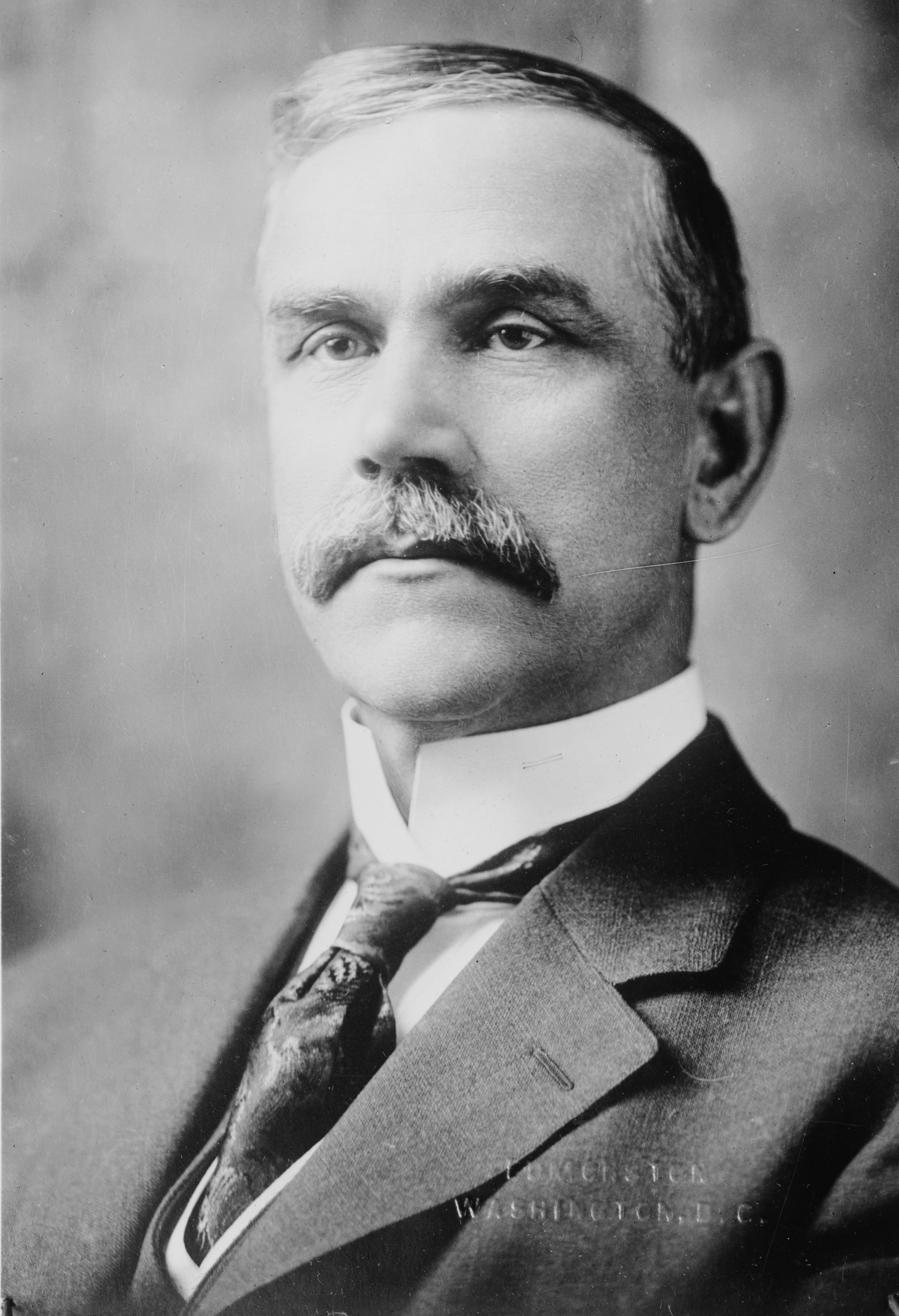
Reed Smoot remained a senator for 30 years.

- January 10: The LDS Church becomes debt-free.
- February 20: After more than two years of hearings, the Smoot Hearings are resolved by a vote. The republican majority overturns objections to his seating. Reed Smoot serves another 26 years.
- June: The Smith Family Farm is acquired for the LDS Church.
- December 7: Charles W. Nibley becomes the Presiding Bishop and brings financial reforms, including tithing payments only in cash, no longer taking donations in kind.
- December 14: Converts in Europe are advised to remain in their home countries instead of gathering to Utah.
- Zion's Printing and Publishing Company is started at Independence, Missouri by the LDS Church.

=== 1908 ===
- April 8: The General Priesthood Committee is created.
- October: A financial auditing report is presented at General Conference for the first time.

=== 1909 ===
- November: The First Presidency issues an official statement regarding questions concerning the Creation of the earth and the theories of evolution and the origin of man.
- LDS Church purchased property in Far West, Missouri, including the former temple lot.
- LDS priesthood meetings begin to be held weekly.
- Japanese translation of Book of Mormon, the first in an east Asian language.

== 1910s ==
=== 1910 ===
- January: The Utah Genealogical and Historical Magazine is launched, published by the Genealogical Society of Utah.
- April 14: Daughters of the Utah Handcart Pioneers founded.

=== 1911 ===
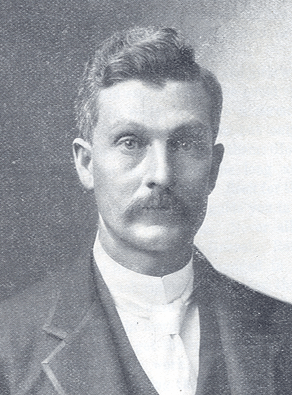
John W. Taylor was excommunicated for violating the Second Manifesto.

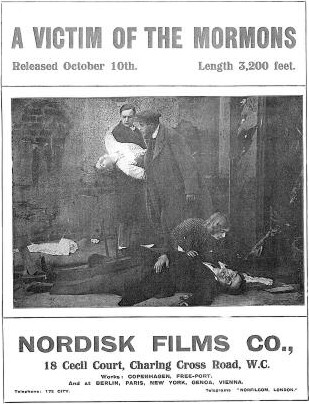
Publicity for A Victim of the Mormons, which ushered in a number of sensationalist anti-Mormon films.

- February 10: Three popular BYU professors appear before church leaders for teaching evolution. After becoming a public controversy, the professors resign later that year. Historian Leonard Arrington called this Mormonism's "first brush with modernism".
- March 28: John W. Taylor is excommunicated for performing a plural marriage despite the Second Manifesto issued by church president Joseph F. Smith. With this excommunication, the practice of new polygamous marriages is believed to be finally abolished. Polygamists who were married prior to 1905 continue to remain in good standing with the LDS Church including, but not limited to, the church's president, Joseph F. Smith.
- April 15: Theodore Roosevelt publishes an article in Collier's magazine defending the Mormons, in response to an ongoing anti-Mormon campaign in national magazines.
- April–May: Mexican Revolution. The Battle of Ciudad Juárez brings war to the doorstep of the Mormon Colonies in Mexico in the Casas Grandes valley.
- June 9: The Hotel Utah opens across from Temple Square in Salt Lake City.
- August: James E. Talmage denounces the Michigan relics as fakes.
- September 16: A photographer threatens to publicly display unauthorized photographs of the interior of the Salt Lake Temple unless the church pays $100,000. Instead president Joseph F. Smith arranges the church to publish a book containing its own such photos.
- October: A Victim of the Mormons (Danish: Mormonens Offer) a Danish silent film directed by August Blom is released. The film was controversial for demonizing the Mormon religion, and its box-office success is cited for initiating a decade of anti-Mormon propaganda films in America.
- October 26: Stake missionaries are first called, in the Granite Utah Stake.
- November 29: The M.I.A. Scouts are created as the first official LDS organization of the Boy Scouts of America.

=== 1912 ===
- Summer: Mormon colonies in Mexico are evacuated due to anti-American sentiment during the Mexican Revolution, and many of their citizens leave for the United States and never return. Some colonists did eventually return, but today only Colonia Juárez and Colonia Dublan in the Casas Grandes river valley remain active.
- September 30: James E. Talmage's The House of the Lord published. It is the first book to have official photographs of temple interiors.
- September: The first LDS seminary opens with religious classes for students from Granite High School in Salt Lake City, Utah.
- November 8: The Correlation Committee is organized to help eliminate redundancy in LDS Church auxiliaries.
- Publication of Riders of the Purple Sage, by Zane Grey. It is his best known novel and played a significant role in shaping the formula of the popular Western genre. However it contains unflattering portrayals and stereotyping of Mormon polygamists.

=== 1913 ===
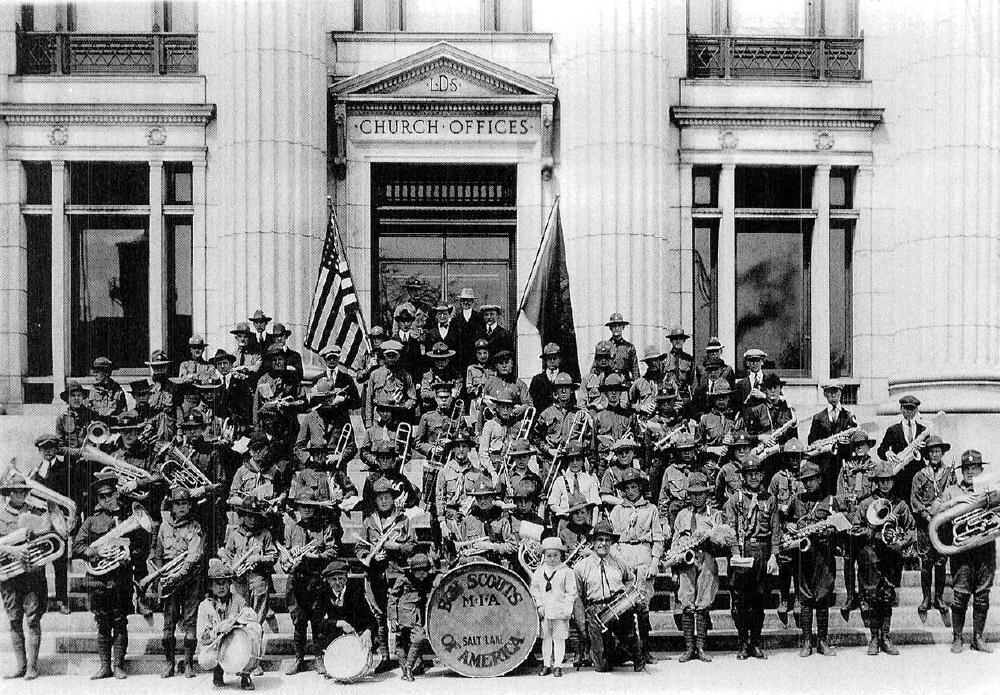
MIA Scouts in front of the Church Administration Building.

- May 21: The Boy Scouts of America program is officially adopted for use in the LDS Church.
- October 1: Joseph F. Smith dedicates the Seagull Monument in the Temple Square of Salt Lake City, Utah.
- One Hundred Years of Mormonism premiers.
- Maori Agricultural College is created in New Zealand by the LDS Church.

=== 1915 ===
- January: Relief Society Magazine begins publication for LDS women.
- April 27: Home Evening program is introduced, calling for families to study the gospel together at home.
- September: Jesus the Christ by James E. Talmage is published. It remains popular to this day.

=== 1916 ===
- June 30: "The Father and the Son", an official declaration from the First Presidency, discusses the identities of Heavenly Father and Jesus Christ.

=== 1917 ===
- October 2: The Church Administration Building is completed.
- Russian Revolution which results in the Soviet Union after a protracted civil war. The region is not opened to missionaries until the early 1990s and travel to there by outsiders becomes more difficult.

=== 1918 ===
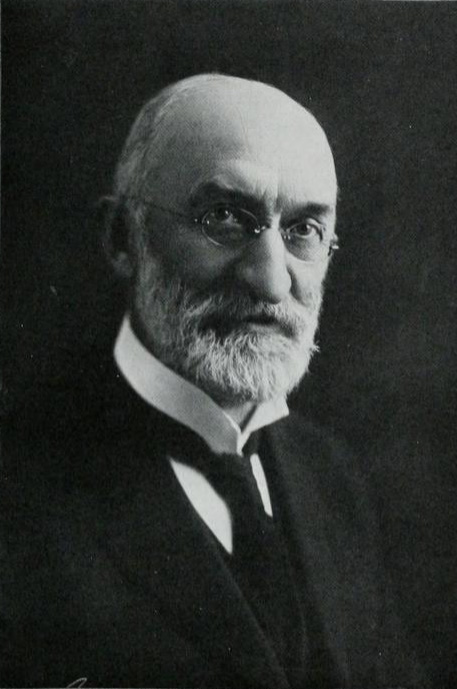
Heber J. Grant became LDS Church president.

- May 16: Arrangements are announced for the Relief Society to sell its wheat storage of over 200,000 bushels to the U.S. government, to cover military food shortages near the end of World War I.
- October 4: Joseph F. Smith announces at General Conference his revelation about the ministry to those in the afterlife, now known as Section 138 of the Doctrine and Covenants.
- October 31: The Quorum of the Twelve and the Patriarch of the Church unanimously accept Smith's revelation as official church canon.
- November 19: Joseph F. Smith passes away.
- November 23: Heber J. Grant becomes the seventh president of the LDS Church.

=== 1919 ===
- April: General Conference is postponed to June because of the Spanish flu epidemic.
- November 27: Laie Hawaii Temple first outside continental United States, and thus also arguably first outside North America and first in Polynesia.
- LDS Church membership reaches 500,000.

== 1920s ==
=== 1920 ===
- December 2: Apostle David O. McKay and Hugh J. Cannon, editor of the Improvement Era, are set apart for a year-long tour of LDS missions and schools across the world. As the most widely traveled general authority, McKay retains a vision for worldwide church growth.
- The LDS Church closes its system of academies.

=== 1921 ===
- Lectures on Faith removed from Standard Works.
- New programs for young adults are created, called M-Men and Gleaners.
- Joseph Fielding Smith's Essentials in Church History is published, an influential book of devotional LDS history that remained in print for more than 50 years.

=== 1922 ===
- February 7: Zions Securities founded.
- May 6: KZN radio (later KSL) goes on air in Salt Lake City, with LDS Church involvement, and makes a message of Heber J. Grant the first church broadcast.
- May: Primary Children's Hospital opens in its first facilities.
- Trapped by the Mormons (also released as The Mormon Peril), a 1922 silent British anti-Mormon film directed by H. B. Parkinson, is released.

=== 1923 ===
- August 26: Cardston Alberta Temple, first outside United States, and first in another country.
- LDS Church first acquires part of the Hill Cumorah, the site where Joseph Smith reported finding the Golden Plates.

=== 1924 ===
- January: Lorin C. Woolley is excommunicated from the LDS Church for alleging that church president Heber J. Grant and apostle James E. Talmage had taken plural wives in the "recent past". He claimed to have learned this while spying on LDS Church leaders for the United States Secret Service. Grant publicly denied these claims in general conference in April 1931. Wooly later founded the polygamous Mormon fundamentalism movement.
- April: A microphone is first used in General Conference, allowing overflow attendees to hear the proceedings in another building on Temple Square.
- October 3: The first General Conference radio broadcast.

=== 1925 ===
- July 18: In the wake of the Scopes Trial, the First Presidency issues an official statement, an edited version of the 1909 statement, regarding questions about the Creation of the earth, the theory of evolution, and the origin of man.
- February 3: The Salt Lake Mission Home is dedicated, for use in training of LDS missionaries before they depart for their assignments.
- April 21: The LDS Church buys a controlling interest in a Salt Lake City radio station, which it changes from KZN to KSL and still maintains today.
- December 25: South America is dedicated for missionary proselyting, by LDS Apostle Melvin J. Ballard in Buenos Aires, Argentina.

=== 1926 ===
- Fall: The first Institute of Religion is founded in Moscow, Idaho, adjacent to the University of Idaho.
- September 25: The LDS Church purchases the Peter Whitmer Farm in Fayette, New York, the site where Joseph Smith founded the church in 1830.

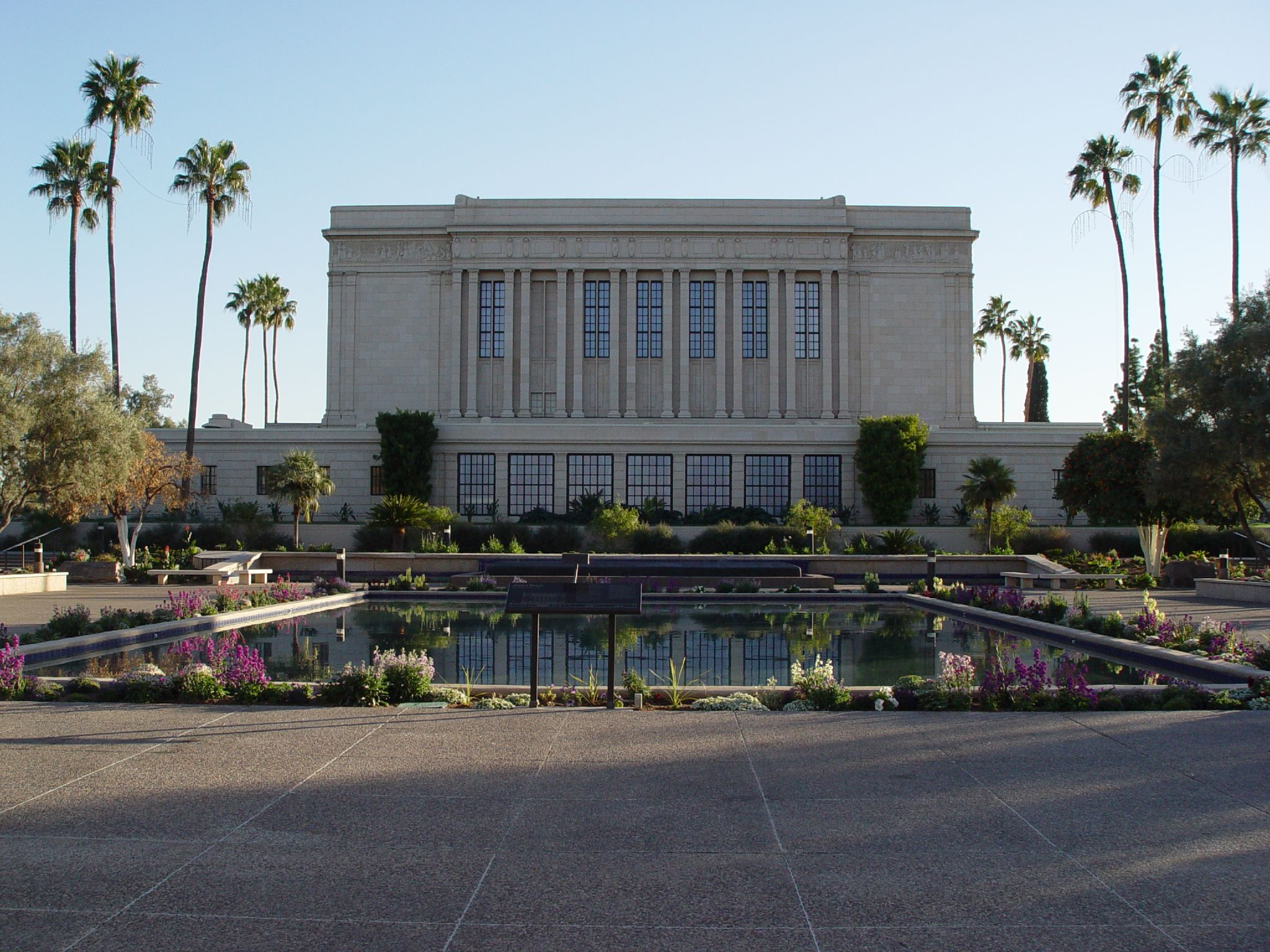
Arizona Temple

=== 1927 ===
- October 23: The Arizona Temple is dedicated.
- Good Neighbor Policy adopted. The reforms were primarily intended to remove from church literature, sermons, and ceremonies any explicit or implicit suggestion that Latter-day Saints should seek vengeance on the citizens or government of the United States for past persecutions of the church and its members, and in particular for the death of Joseph Smith and his brother Hyrum.

=== 1928 ===
- The 100th stake of the LDS Church is organized, in Lehi, Utah.
- The LDS adult Sunday School class is named Gospel Doctrine.

=== 1929 ===
- July 15: Using a single microphone for the speaker, organ, and choir, Music and the Spoken Word performs its first radio broadcast.
- July 24: The first mission in Eastern Europe is created in Czechoslovakia.
- Young Woman's Journal ceases publication.

== 1930s ==
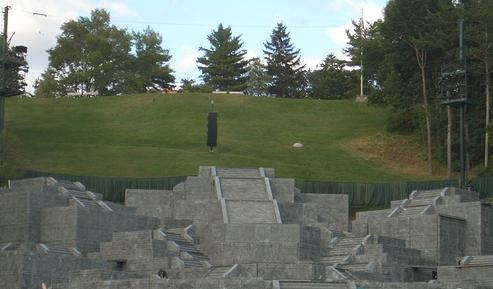
Stage of the pageant on the Hill Cumorah

=== 1930 ===
- April 6: The LDS Church celebrates its centennial at its General Conference. In honor of this event, B. H. Roberts publishes his 6-volume Comprehensive History of the Church.
- Juvenile Instructor replaced with The Instructor

=== 1931 ===
- April 4: The "Church Section" of the Deseret News is created, which would become the Church News.
- LDS High School closed.
- All LDS Church junior colleges are transferred to their respective states (Utah, Arizona, and Idaho), although Ricks College remains in church ownership.

=== 1932 ===
- April 2: A new emphasis is placed on Word of Wisdom observance, especially in tobacco abstinence.

=== 1933 ===
- July 26: The first LDS Church historic marker in Nauvoo, Illinois is installed by the Relief Society.
- November 5: Washington D.C. chapel of the LDS Church is dedicated.
- Sons of Utah Pioneers founded.

=== 1935 ===
- April 20: Harold B. Lee, a stake president and future LDS Church president, is called to create the church's Welfare Program.
- June 21: The Hill Cumorah Monument is dedicated, with a golden statue of the Angel Moroni, on the site where Joseph Smith said he was led to the records of the Book of Mormon.
- August 22: Gordon B. Hinckley, a newly returned missionary and future LDS Church president, begins works on the church's Radio, Publicity, and Mission Literature Committee.
- A pageant is first performed in Palmyra, New York, which would become the Hill Cumorah Pageant.

=== 1936 ===
- April: Stake missions are placed under the First Council of the Seventy, which calls for missions to be created in all stakes.
- April 7: Church Welfare Program established.
- September 20: A monument at the Winter Quarters Mormon Pioneer Cemetery is dedicated.
- Braille edition of Book of Mormon.
- General Conference is first broadcast to Europe, by shortwave radio.

=== 1937 ===
- January: Ages for office-holders in the Aaronic priesthood are defined as 12 for deacons, 15 for teachers, and 17 for priests. This would be revised in 1954.
- February 20: Part of the Nauvoo Temple lot is acquired for the LDS Church.
- July: LDS Church pageant in Palmyra, New York is moved to the Hill Cumorah, where it is still performed today.
- The first Missionary Handbook is published.
- J. Reuben Clark calls for LDS Church members to begin to store a year's supply of food and supplies.
- The Martin Harris Farm is acquired for the LDS Church in Palmyra, New York.

=== 1938 ===
- August 8: J. Reuben Clark calls for church educators to focus on building students' faith in his speech "The Charted Course of the Church in Education", which became a classic text influencing the mission of CES.
- August 14: Deseret Industries is started.
- November: The Genealogical Society of Utah (now called FamilySearch) begins to microfilm records of genealogical data. This grew into a massive collection from around the world, which is being digitized today.
- Local church education boards are replaced by the new General Church Board of Education.

=== 1939 ===
- June 19: Liberty Jail is acquired for the LDS Church.
- August 24: All LDS missionaries in Europe are called to return home, due to the buildup of World War II.
- Portuguese translation of Book of Mormon.

== 1940s ==
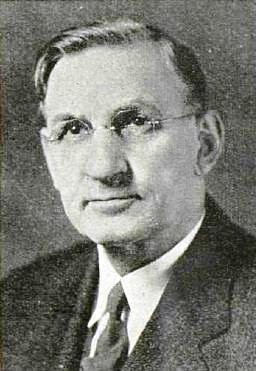
Richard R. Lyman, the most recent apostle of the LDS Church to have been excommunicated.

=== 1940 ===
- September 27: Theatrical release of Brigham Young, a Hollywood biopic, featuring Dean Jagger as Brigham Young, and Vincent Price as Joseph Smith. Though the film is commercially unsuccessful, it brings Mormon history to a wider international audience.
- October 14: All LDS missionaries in the Pacific islands are called home, due to rising tensions in the buildup to the Pacific War in World War II.

=== 1941 ===
- April 6: The position of Assistant to the Quorum of the Twelve Apostles is created.
- April 6: Marion G. Romney is sustained as Church's first Assistant to the Twelve.
- April 10: Harold B. Lee is ordained to the Quorum of the Twelve Apostles.
- May: Hugh B. Brown is called to be the LDS Servicemen's Coordinator.
- The Presiding Bishop's office organizes central management of LDS Church membership records.

=== 1942 ===
- April: Because of war-time travel restrictions, General Conference was limited to certain priesthood leaders in the Assembly Hall, and not the general public.
- May: The Improvement Era begins devoting an issue for each General Conference, publishing all the talks.
- October: The LDS Servicemen's Committee is created, headed by Apostle Harold B. Lee.
- October: Helmuth Hübener, a German Latter-day Saint is the youngest opponent of the Third Reich to be sentenced to death by the infamous Special People's Court (Volksgerichtshof) and executed.
- The first time an evening meeting of General Conference is held.

=== 1943 ===
- LDS Church apostle Richard R. Lyman was discovered to be cohabitating with a woman other than his legal wife, in a relationship that he defined as a polygamous marriage. Lyman was excommunicated on November 12, 1943, at age 73, on grounds of a violation of the law of chastity, which any practice of post-Second Manifesto polygamy constituted. He was later rebaptized and died in the church. He is the most recent apostle to be excommunicated.
- 1943 October 7: Spencer W. Kimball and Ezra Taft Benson are ordained to the Quorum of the Twelve Apostles.

=== 1944 ===
- July: The Church Committee on Publications is created, headed by Apostle Joseph Fielding Smith.

=== 1945 ===
- April 12: Mormon Tabernacle Choir performs at funeral of Franklin D. Roosevelt.
- May 14: Heber J. Grant, the last LDS Church president to have practiced polygamy, dies.
- May 21: George Albert Smith becomes the eighth president of the church.
- September: Following the Japanese surrender, ending World War II, new mission presidents are called to reopen missions that were closed during the war.
- September 23: The Idaho Falls Temple is dedicated.
- October: The priesthood session of General Conference is held for the first time.
- November 3: New LDS Church president George Albert Smith and U.S. president Harry S Truman meet and discuss sending humanitarian supplies to war-torn Europe.
- The publication of No Man Knows My History: The Life of Joseph Smith, by Fawn Brodie. Brodie's most notable Mormon critic, Brigham Young University professor Hugh Nibley, published a scathing 62-page pamphlet entitled No, Ma'am, That's Not History, asserting that Brodie had cited sources supportive only of her conclusions while conveniently ignoring others. Brodie considered Nibley's pamphlet to be "a well-written, clever piece of Mormon propaganda" but dismissed it as "a flippant and shallow piece". Brodie's book becomes a best seller, and has not got out of print yet.
- Raid on the Short Creek Community, prefiguring that of 1953.

=== 1946 ===
- January: The LDS Church begins sending humanitarian supplies to war-torn nations in Europe, following World War II.
- February 4: Ezra Taft Benson embarks on a tour of Europe following World War II, to oversee the state of the church and reorganize missionary work.
- May: Fawn Brodie is excommunicated.
- May 22: Western Bad Bascomb released, about an outlaw who joins a Mormon wagon train.
- May 26: A rift in the LDS Church in Mexico is mended, as 1,200 members of the Third Convention return into fellowship at a large conference in Mexico City attended by George Albert Smith, the first church president to visit the country.
- Tongan edition of Book of Mormon.

=== 1947 ===
- February 26: Matthew Cowley embarks on a tour of the Pacific islands, to reestablish missionary work after World War II.
- July 24: Centennial celebration of the Mormon pioneers' arrival in Utah. A caravan of automobiles with covered wagon tops travels from Nauvoo, Illinois to Salt Lake City. LDS Church president George Albert Smith dedicates This is the Place Monument.
- Indian Placement Program initiated.
- LDS Church membership surpasses one million.

=== 1948 ===
- George Albert Smith is said to have petitioned the Lord to lift the ban on blacks receiving the priesthood. He claims he is denied. The ban was not lifted until 1978.

=== 1949 ===
- October: The first public broadcast of General Conference on television. Conference talks are given time limits for the first time, to fit with broadcast station timetables.

== 1950s ==
=== 1950 ===
- August 8: George F. Richards, president of the Quorum of the Twelve Apostles, dies.
- September 1: The first early-morning seminary is started in southern California.
- October 5: Delbert L. Stapley is ordained to the Quorum of the Twelve Apostles.
- December 1: LeGrand Richards publishes A Marvelous Work and a Wonder, which became a best-selling Mormon book and was translated into many languages.
- Deseret Ranches established.

=== 1951 ===
- April 4: George Albert Smith dies on his birthday.
- April 9: David O. McKay becomes church president.
- July 20: Due to shortages of young men during the Korean War, some seventies and married men are asked to serve as LDS missionaries.
- October 11: Marion G. Romney is ordained to the Quorum of the Twelve Apostles.
- November 12: Paint Your Wagon by Lerner and Loewe becomes a hit on Broadway, but includes unflattering stereotypes of Mormon characters.

=== 1952 ===
- February 3: Joseph F. Merrill dies.
- March 2: Primary Children's Hospital opens in its new hospital facility in the Avenues, Salt Lake City.
- April 5: The first broadcast beyond Temple Square for the priesthood session of General Conference, by use of direct telephone wire.
- April 6: LeGrand Richards is ordained to the Quorum of the Twelve Apostles.
- November 20: John A. Widtsoe dies.
- November 25: Ezra Taft Benson, a sitting LDS apostle, becomes United States Secretary of Agriculture under U.S. President Dwight D. Eisenhower.
- December 31: The LDS Primary program adopts Cub Scouting.
- Construction of Church College of New Zealand began.
- The first lesson plan for LDS missionaries is published, A Systematic Program for Teaching the Gospel.

=== 1953 ===
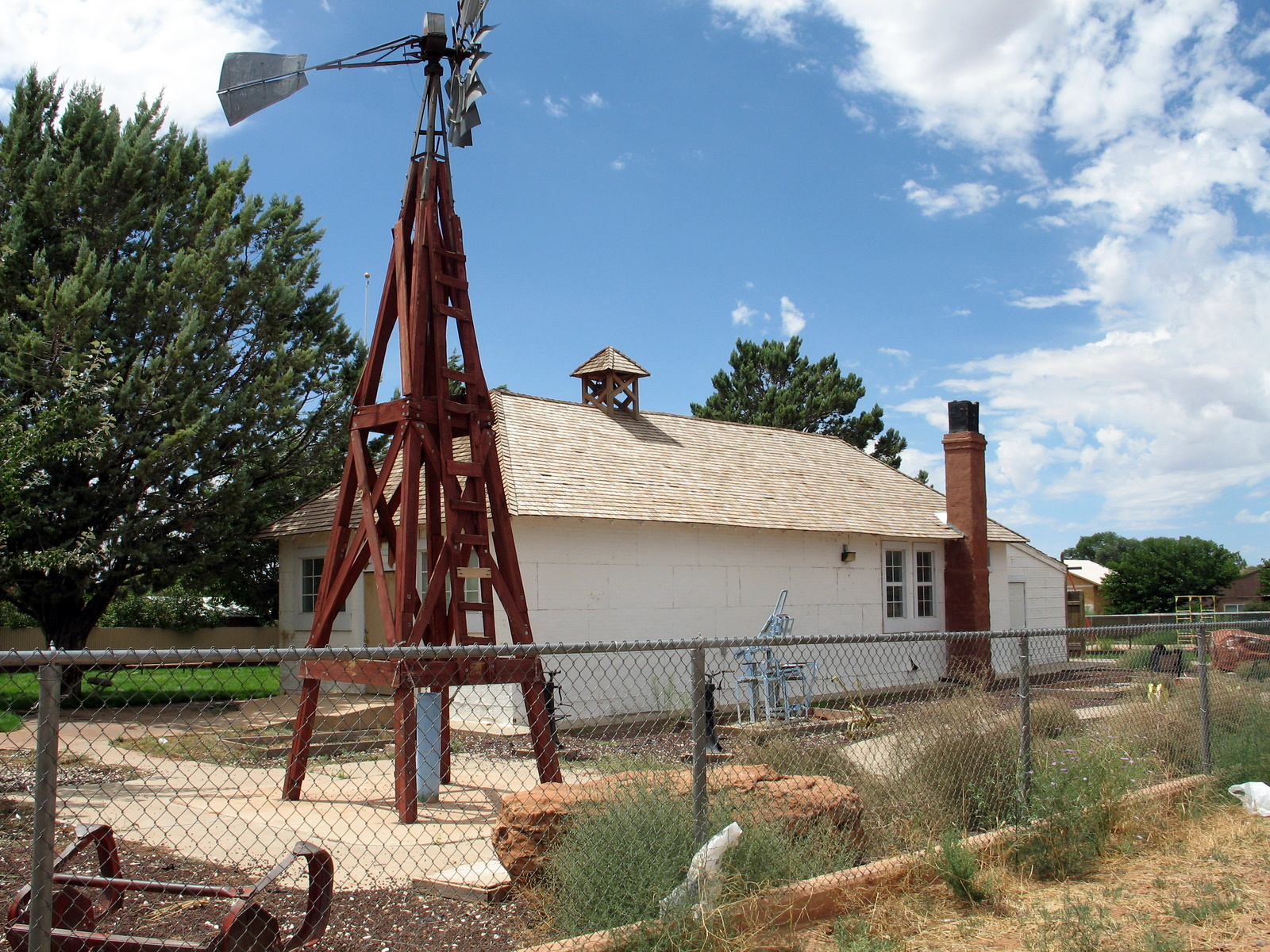
The schoolhouse where the Short Creek raid took place.

- March 25: Returning LDS missionaries are directed to report to their stake presidents, no longer to the general authorities.
- April 9: Adam S. Bennion is ordained to the Quorum of the Twelve Apostles.
- July 15: Latter-day Saint Apostle Albert E. Bowen dies.
- July 26: Short Creek raid, a mass arrest of polygamists at the Short Creek Community in the Arizona Strip. At the time it was described as "the largest mass arrest of men and women in modern American history".
- October 8: Richard L. Evans is ordained to the Quorum of the Twelve Apostles.
- December 13 Matthew Cowley dies.<Deseret News LDS 2012 Church Almanac>
- Independent Latter Day Saint congregations in Nigeria develop in response to ban on black priesthood.
- General Conference begins broadcasting on television outside the Intermountain West.

=== 1954 ===
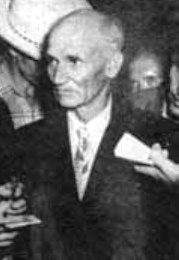
Leroy S. Johnson's fundamentalist Mormon followers would become the FLDS Church.

- April 8: George Q. Morris is ordained to the Quorum of the Twelve Apostles.
- March 29: Death of Joseph W. Musser, leader of the Council of Friends, and the Mormon fundamentalist community splits over succession. In the Short Creek Community, Leroy S. Johnson's followers would form the Fundamentalist Church of Jesus Christ of Latter-Day Saints (FLDS Church). In Salt Lake City, Rulon C. Allred's followers would form the Apostolic United Brethren (AUB).
- August 31: Ages for office-holders in the Aaronic priesthood are defined as 12 for deacons, 14 for teachers, and 16 for priests.

=== 1955 ===
- September 11: Bern Switzerland Temple is opened, the first outside North America, and in Europe. It introduces films for the Endowment ceremony in various languages.
- September 26: Church College of Hawaii is established.

=== 1956 ===
- January 8: Student Wards and Stakes are first organized, at Brigham Young University.
- October 3: The Relief Society Building is dedicated, across from Temple Square in Salt Lake City.

=== 1957 ===
- April: General Conference is first recorded and rebroadcast via videotape.
- October: General Conference is cancelled due to the Asian Flu pandemic.

=== 1958 ===
- February 11: Adam S. Bennion dies after serving only five years.
- April 10: Hugh B. Brown is ordained to the Quorum of the Twelve Apostles.
- April 20: Hamilton New Zealand Temple opens, the first in Oceania and the Southern Hemisphere.
- April 26: Church College of New Zealand founded.
- May 18: The New Zealand Stake is created in Auckland, the first outside North America and Hawaii.
- September: London England Temple, the first in UK opened.
- Mormon Doctrine by Bruce R. McConkie published.
- Priesthood opened up to black Melanesian males (Fijians, Papuans, Negritos etc.).

=== 1959 ===
- BYU Studies, a journal for LDS scholars, commences publication.

== 1960s ==
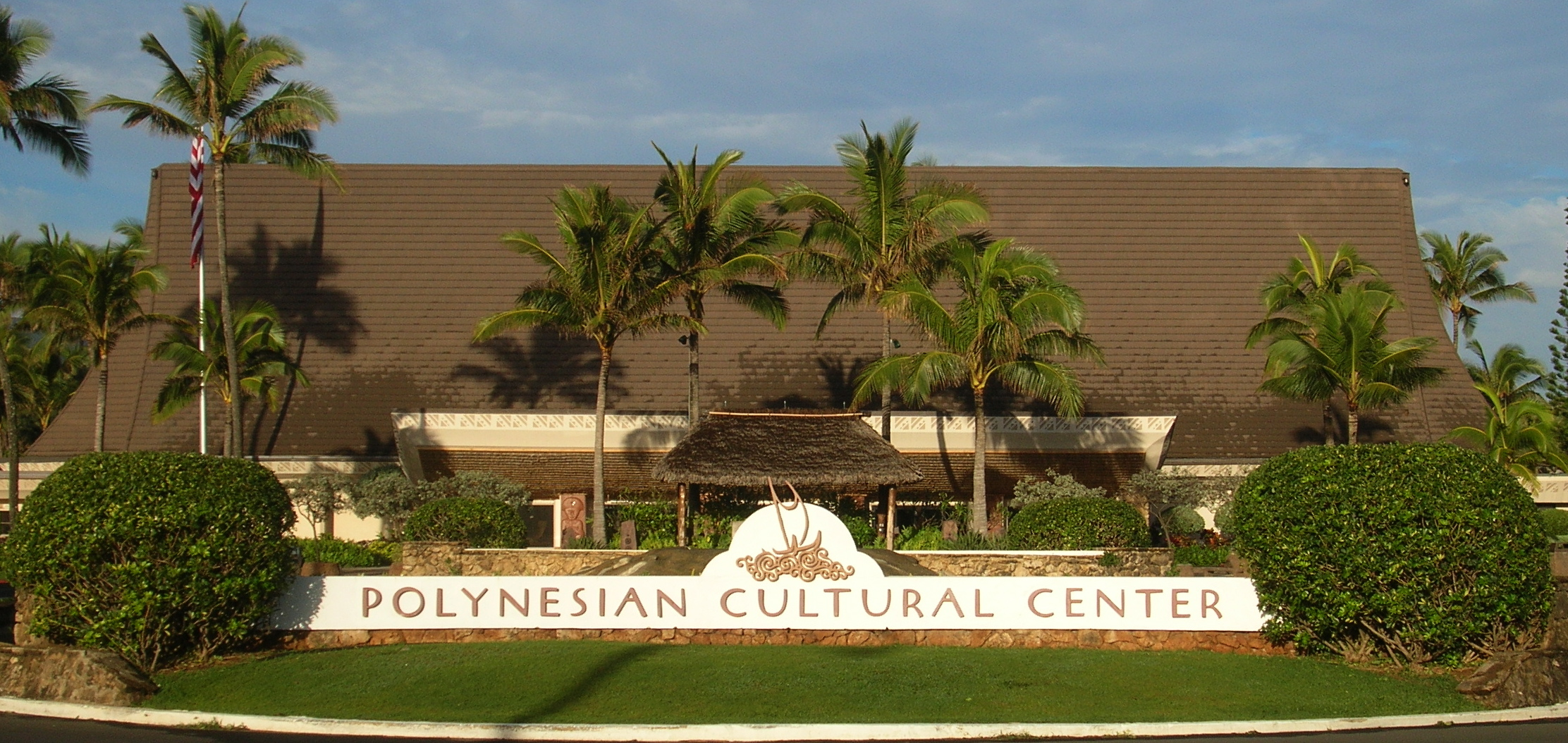
Entrance to The Polynesian Cultural Center.

=== 1960 ===
- March 27: A stake is created at Manchester, England, the first in Europe.
- November 29: Mormon Tabernacle Choir wins a Grammy for its recording of the Battle Hymn of the Republic.

=== 1961 ===
- March 12: The first non-English-speaking stake is created at The Hague in the Netherlands.
- June 26: A system for teaching standard missionary discussions is introduced.
- September 30: Announcement that the Priesthood Correlation Program will place all LDS Church programs under priesthood oversight.
- October: With new stakes outside the United States and leaders travelling to Utah, translators are first used in General Conference to provide live talks for other languages (starting with German, Dutch, Samoan, and Spanish).
- October 6: J. Reuben Clark dies.
- December 2: Gordon B. Hinckley is ordained to the Quorum of the Twelve Apostles.
- December 3: The first Spanish-speaking stake of the LDS Church is created, in Mexico City.
- December 4: The Language Training Institute is created at Brigham Young University, to train LDS missionaries learning a foreign language. This became the Language Training Mission, and then the Missionary Training Center in 1978.

=== 1962 ===
- March: The age entrance requirement for male LDS missionaries is lowered from 20 to 19 years old.
- April 23: George Q. Morris dies.
- July 23: The first satellite broadcast of the Mormon Tabernacle Choir.
- July 27: Nauvoo Restoration, Inc. is created, to preserve and renovate Mormon historical sites in Nauvoo, Illinois.
- October 10: The LDS Church acquires WRUL for international short-wave broadcasting.
- October 11: N. Eldon Tanner is ordained to the Quorum of the Twelve Apostles.

=== 1963 ===
- September 18: Henry D. Moyle dies.
- October 4: Thomas S. Monson is ordained to the Quorum of the Twelve Apostles.
- October: N. Eldon Tanner, after having been an apostle for only one year, is called as second counselor to David O. McKay in the First Presidency. He spends the rest of his life serving in the First Presidency.
- October 12: Polynesian Cultural Center founded.
- November 24: Mormon Tabernacle Choir performs at funeral of John F. Kennedy.
- The Genealogical Society of Utah's microfilm collection is moved to the newly completed Granite Mountain Records Vault for long-term preservation.
- LDS Church membership surpasses two million.

=== 1964 ===
- January 1: The Home Teaching program replaces Ward Teaching, and is placed under Melchizedek Priesthood quorums as part of the LDS Church's correlation effort.
- January: Priesthood Executive Committees and Correlation Councils are launched at the ward level.
- February 17: Centro Escolar Benemérito de las Américas, an LDS preparatory school in Mexico, holds its first classes.
- April 22: At the 1964 New York World's Fair, the LDS Church opens the Mormon Pavilion and debuts the short film Man's Search for Happiness.
- October: David O. McKay followed doctor's advice to not attend General Conference but he sent two messages to be read by his sons, marking the first time a president's message was delivered by someone else.
- October 3: Family Home Evening is reemphasized, with a new manual and training, and increasing from once per month to one night per week (which became Monday in 1970).
- November 17: The Oakland Temple is dedicated in California.
- Joseph W. B. Johnson, in Ghana, claims he was told by Jesus to preach the Book of Mormon and the Joseph Smith story to the Ghanaians. Over time, he converts 1,000 people, all who cannot hold priesthood in the church until the revelation received in 1978.
- Independent Latter Day Saint congregations in Ghana develop in response to ban on black priesthood.

=== 1965 ===
- February: LDS missionaries are allowed into Italy, for the first time since 1862.
- December 28: The Mormon History Association is founded, for fostering professional scholarship in Mormon history.
- Chinese language edition of Book of Mormon, retranslated 2007.

=== 1966 ===
- March: Dialogue: A Journal of Mormon Thought, the oldest independent journal in Mormon Studies, is established.
- May 1: The first stake in South America is created in São Paulo, Brazil.
- Establishment of Deseret Management Corporation
- August: Visitors' Center opens on Temple Square, starting a trend of modern public relations buildings.

=== 1967 ===
- September 29: The position of Regional representative of the Twelve is created, to begin functioning on January 1, 1968.
- November 27: Fragments of the recently rediscovered Joseph Smith Papyri, described as having been used in preparing the Book of Abraham, are given to the LDS Church by the Metropolitan Museum of Art.
- The first color television broadcast of General Conference.

=== 1968 ===
- October: Belle S. Spafford is elected president of the National Council of Women of the United States, while she is also serving as general president of the Relief Society.
- Brigham Young High School closes.

=== 1969 ===
- January 3: LDS missionaries called to non-English-speaking service will first study for two months at the Language Training Mission.
- Upon hearing news of Billy Johnson's work in Ghana and others in Africa, David O. McKay petitions the Lord to lift the ban on blacks receiving the priesthood. He says that it is denied. It is not until 1978 that the ban is lifted.
- Mormon Youth Symphony and Chorus established.

== 1970s ==
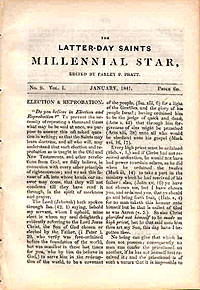
Millennial Star

=== 1970 ===
- January 18: David O. McKay dies.
- January 18: The 500th stake is created in Fallon, Nevada.
- January 23: Joseph Fielding Smith becomes church president.
- March 15: The first stake in Asia is created in Tokyo, Japan.
- March 22: The first stake in Africa is created in Transvaal, South Africa.
- April 9: Boyd K. Packer is ordained to the Quorum of the Twelve Apostles.
- September: Monday is reserved for holding Family Home Evening.
- Improvement Era, Millennial Star cease publication.

=== 1971 ===
- January: Ensign, New Era, and Friend magazines are first published; several publications are discontinued.
- February: One Bad Apple released by The Osmonds reaches No. 1 in Billboard's Hot 100 Chart and stayed there for five weeks; it also reached No. 6 on the R&B chart. The members of the Osmonds are devout LDS, and their religion was discussed in many popular media outlets.
- June 8: The Genesis Group is formed. It becomes an official church auxiliary dedicated to serving the needs of black members, who cannot hold the priesthood at this time.
- September 1: Relief Society dues are dropped and all LDS women are automatically enrolled.
- November 1: Richard L. Evans dies.
- December 2: Marvin J. Ashton is ordained to the Quorum of the Twelve Apostles.
- Church building provided in Jerusalem for large numbers of LDS tourists.

=== 1972 ===
- January 14: Leonard Arrington is appointed Church Historian, inaugurating a "Camelot" period in the field of Mormon history. At the same time, the Church Historian's Office is modernized into the Church Historical Department.
- May 14: Afrikaans edition of Book of Mormon, first in an African language.
- June 3: The Public Communications Department is created, initially called the External Communications Department, to address public relations. It would become the Public Affairs Department in 1991.
- July 2: After serving for two years as president, Joseph Fielding Smith dies.
- July 7: Harold B. Lee becomes the 11th president of the LDS Church.
- Fall: LDS Sunday School adult classes begin using the scriptures for curriculum, instead of separate manuals on gospel themes.
- October 12: Bruce R. McConkie is ordained to the Quorum of the Twelve Apostles.
- November 4: The Church Office Building is first opened.
- November 9: Aaronic Priesthood MIA Young Women established.

=== 1973 ===
- February: Agricultural missionary work is introduced in South America.
- April 7: The Welfare Services Department is created by the Priesthood Correlation Program, combining existing services, including the Welfare Program.
- June : The Plan, a concept album by the Osmonds is released. Although it is not one of their more successful albums, it explicitly deals with Mormon theology, including the plan of salvation.
- December 26: After serving for little more than a year as president, Harold B. Lee dies.
- December 30: Spencer W. Kimball becomes the 12th president of the LDS Church.

=== 1974 ===
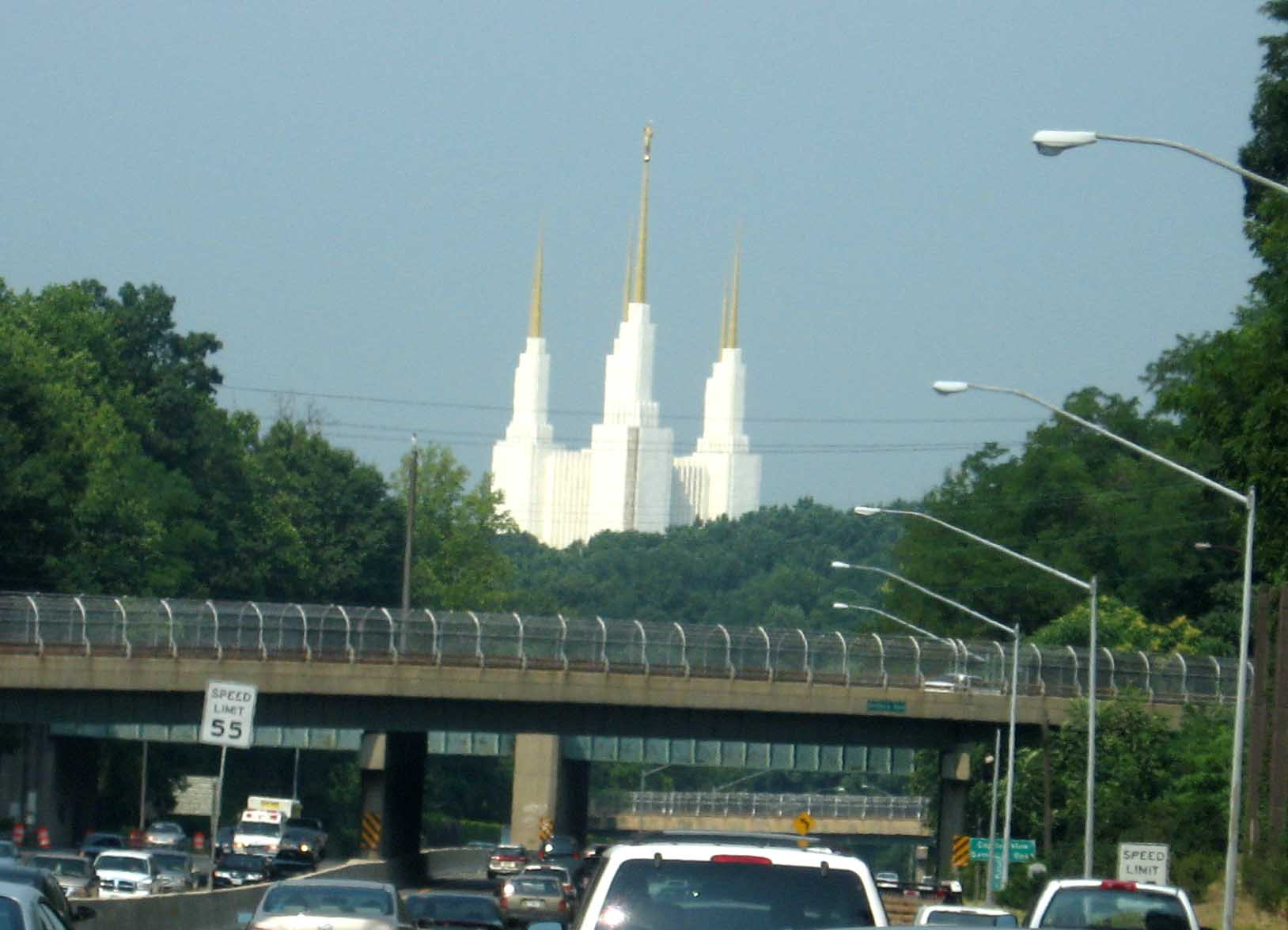
Washington D.C. Temple as seen from the Outer Loop of the Capital Beltway

- April 4: Spencer W. Kimball calls for those in the LDS Church to "lengthen your stride".
- April 11: L. Tom Perry is ordained to the Quorum of the Twelve Apostles.
- June 23: Aaronic Priesthood MIA Young Women dissolved into Aaronic Priesthood and Young Women organizations.
- June 20: The LDS Church implements regional reorganization, including standardized naming of missions and stakes.
- August: Love Me for a Reason by the Osmonds reaches No. 1 in the UK Singles Charts.
- September 1: The Church College of Hawaii is renamed Brigham Young University-Hawaii, as a satellite campus of BYU in Provo, Utah.
- September 6: Announcement that all LDS Church-owned hospitals would be divested into a new nonprofit organization, called Intermountain Health Care. This finalized on April 1, 1975.
- October 3: Stake seventies quorums are combined with stake missionary leadership.
- November 19: Washington D.C. Temple is dedicated, in a prominent position along the Capital Beltway.

=== 1975 ===
- May 3: Regional stakes and districts are grouped into areas, under area supervisors.
- June 27: LDS church-wide conferences for auxiliaries are discontinued, including the June Conference.
- July 24: The Church Office Building is dedicated, across from Temple Square in Salt Lake City.
- October 3: The First Quorum of the Seventy is reconstituted. In 1976 it absorbs the First Council of the Seventy and the Assistants to the Quorum of the Twelve Apostles.
- October 3: George P. Lee becomes first Native American general authority. He is excommunicated on September 1, 1989.
- November 7: Sunstone, an independent magazine about Mormon issues, is first published.
- November 11–12: Spencer W. Kimball rededicates the St. George Utah Temple after renovation.
- December 2: Hugh B. Brown dies.
- Association of Mormon Counselors and Psychotherapists (AMCAP) is founded.

=== 1976 ===
- January 8: David B. Haight is ordained to the Quorum of the Twelve Apostles.
- January 23: First airing of Donny & Marie show on American TV.
- April 1: Western The Duchess and the Dirtwater Fox released starring Goldie Hawn and George Segal. The storyline involves the main characters seek refuge from outlaws by joining a wagon train of Mormons.
- April 3: Two revelations are added to the LDS scriptural canon (in the Pearl of Great Price), one of Joseph Smith and one of Joseph F. Smith. In 1981 they became Doctrine and Covenants sections 137 and 138.
- June 26: The Mormon Extermination Order from 1844 is officially rescinded by Missouri Governor Christopher S. Bond.
- July 4: Mormon Tabernacle Choir performs at the United States Bicentennial.

=== 1977 ===
- April: General Conference is reduced from 3 days down to 2 days, and moves from April 6 to the first Sunday in April and October.
- May 14: The title Young Men is adopted for the Aaronic priesthood program.
- September 19: The Mormon sex in chains case becomes a major scandal in the UK, after a missionary is abducted in Surrey. The coverage was extensive in part because the case was considered so anomalous, involving as it did the issue of rape of a man by a woman.

=== 1978 ===
- March 31: Stake conferences are changed from quarterly to semiannual.
- April 1: The name extraction program is announced for local members to identify deceased persons from vital records and prepare their names for proxy temple ordinances.
- June 1: Spencer W. Kimball receives confirmation and revelation after supplicating the Lord regarding blacks and the priesthood. Moved by the exceeding faith of the Genesis Group, and moved by the dedication and perseverance of the mulattos in Brazil in building the São Paulo Brazil Temple, he takes the matter before the Lord, as many previous presidents of the church have done.
- June 9: Spencer W. Kimball, after receiving the revelation, and discussing the matter with the Quorum of the Twelve and the First Quorum of the Seventy, announces that the ban on blacks receiving the priesthood has been lifted, and all males may receive the priesthood according to their worthiness, regardless of race. Despite previous understanding that blacks were not to receive the priesthood until the millennium, the members of the church receive the announcement with jubilation and it gains worldwide press attention.
- June 23: Joseph Freeman, Jr., 26, the first black man to gain the priesthood in The Church of Jesus Christ of Latter-day Saints, went in the Salt Lake Temple with his wife and 5 sons for sacred ordinances. Thomas S. Monson, a member of the church's Quorum of Twelve Apostles, conducted the marriage and sealing ordinances. This event shows that blacks not only are able to gain the priesthood, but are able to interracially marry in the temple with the church's blessing. (Salt Lake Tribune, June 24, 1978)
- June 30: Spencer W. Kimball dedicates the Monument to Women Memorial Garden in Nauvoo, Illinois.
- August 19: Delbert L. Stapley dies.
- September 9: The Missionary Training Center opens in Provo, Utah, replacing the Language Training Mission and also the Mission Home in Salt Lake City.
- September 17: Battlestar Galactica first airs on American television. It is produced by church member Glen A. Larson, and he incorporated many themes from Mormon theology into the shows.
- September 30: N. Eldon Tanner reads Official Declaration—2 in General Conference, and it is unanimously adopted as the word and will of the Lord. This is the declaration released publicly earlier in 1978, allowing blacks to receive the priesthood.
- September 30: General authority emeritus status is introduced for those above age 70, with the exception of the First Presidency and the Apostles.
- October 1: James E. Faust is ordained to the Quorum of the Twelve Apostles.
- October 30: São Paulo Brazil Temple opened, the first in South America, Latin America and in Brazil.
- Gospel Principles, an official church lesson manual, is released.
- LDS Church membership surpasses four million.

=== 1979 ===
- February 18: The 1000th stake of the LDS Church is created at Nauvoo, Illinois.
- August 24–25: The first Sunstone Symposium is held.
- September 9: New LDS edition of the Bible issued, with cross-references to other LDS scriptures.
- October 6: Eldred G. Smith is made Patriarch Emeritus. The office of Patriarch to the Church remains unfilled due to the availability of local patriarchs.
- October 24: Spencer W. Kimball visits Jerusalem and dedicates Orson Hyde Memorial Garden.
- The leading apologetic organisation Foundation for Ancient Research and Mormon Studies (FARMS) is founded.

== 1980s ==
=== 1980 ===
- March 2: LDS Church meetings are consolidated into a "block" schedule on Sundays, containing Sacrament Meeting, Sunday School, Primary, Young Women, Young Men, priesthood, and Relief Society.
- April 6: The LDS Church celebrates its sesquicentennial, and during General Conference Spencer W. Kimball dedicates the reconstructed log home where the church was founded in 1830.
- May 3: The discovery of the original Anthon Transcript is reported in the Church News. It is later revealed to be one of the early Mark Hofmann forgeries in the 1980s.
- October: Tokyo Japan Temple opens, the first in Asia, and in Japan.

=== 1981 ===
- April 3: The "Three-fold Mission of the Church" (Perfect the Saints, Proclaim the Gospel, and Redeem the Dead) is declared at General Conference by church president Spencer W. Kimball.
- May 5: The LDS Church releases a statement opposing the placement of MX missiles in Utah, leading to a reversal of the Air Force plans.
- June 25: The LDS Church announces plans to install satellite dishes at its stake centers, for the purpose of receiving worldwide church programs, such as General Conference.
- July 23: Gordon B. Hinckley is called as third counselor in the First Presidency, due to the physical weakness of Spencer W. Kimball, N. Eldon Tanner, and Marion G. Romney. Hinckley is referred to in the press as the "acting president of the church" because Kimball, Tanner, and Romney are largely out of the public eye.
- July 23: Neal A. Maxwell is ordained to the Quorum of the Twelve Apostles, filling the vacancy left by Hinckley's call to the First Presidency.
- September 26: New revised editions are published for the Book of Mormon, Doctrine and Covenants, and Pearl of Great Price. They include new sections added to the Doctrine and Covenants, as well as new cross-references, footnotes, index, and other study helps.
- Russian & Polish editions of the Book of Mormon.

=== 1982 ===
- April 2: Local congregations are now only required to fund 4% of building their new meetinghouses, with the remaining 96% paid by the LDS Church's general fund.
- June 1: Ground broken for construction of the Triad Center on June 1, 1982, by Essam Khashoggi, chairman of Triad America.
- October 3: The subtitle Another Testament of Jesus Christ is added to the LDS Church's recently revised edition of the Book of Mormon.
- October 30: The Grandin Print Shop opens as an LDS historic site in Palmyra, New York.
- November 27: N. Eldon Tanner dies. Consequently, Marion G. Romney is named as First Counselor, and Gordon B. Hinckley is named as Second Counselor.
- December 31: The God Makers, an anti-Mormon film by Ed Decker, is premiered, finding screenings in evangelical Christian churches. Its popularity results in books and sequels, and impacts public perception of the LDS Church, although its claims and tone are strongly criticized, even by opponents of the church, for misrepresenting or defaming Mormonism.
- LDS Church membership surpasses five million.

=== 1983 ===
- January 11: LeGrand Richards dies.
- México City México Temple opens, the first in Mexico, and Central America.
- August 5 Apia Samoa Temple opens, the first in the smaller Pacific island groups.
- Q'eqchi' (Quiche) translation of the Book of Mormon. The first in an Amerindian language.

=== 1984 ===
- January: Area Presidencies are filled by General Authorities, who begin to live on-site later in the year.
- January 11: Mark E. Petersen dies.
- April: The genealogy software Personal Ancestral File is released by the LDS Church.
- April 4: The Museum of Church History and Art is dedicated, across from Temple Square in Salt Lake City.
- April 5: The RLDS Church votes to allow women to be ordained to the priesthood. After a failed repeal attempt in 1986, some opponents separate into independent Restoration Branches.
- April 7: Some new members of the First Quorum of the Seventy are only called for 5 years of service, the first general authorities without a lifetime appointment.
- April 12: Russell M. Nelson is ordained to the Quorum of the Twelve Apostles.
- May 3: Dallin H. Oaks is ordained to the Quorum of the Twelve Apostles.
- June: Carol Lynn Pearson's estranged gay husband returns to live with her and their children after being diagnosed with AIDS, and she cares for him until his death. Her 1986 memoir, Goodbye, I Love You, is considered a landmark in discussions of homosexuality and Mormonism.
- July 12: Broadcast house of Triad Center opened.
- September: Sydney Australia Temple, the first in Australia; Manila Philippines Temple the first in the Philippines.
- November: Taipei Taiwan Temple, the first in a mainly Chinese speaking territory.

=== 1985 ===
- January 15: The novel Ender's Game is published by Orson Scott Card, an active LDS Church member. The novel won the Nebula Award for best novel in 1985, and the Hugo Award for best novel in 1986, considered the two most prestigious awards in science fiction. Ender's Game was also nominated for a Locus Award in 1986.
- January 17: An LDS Church-wide fast for African victims of famine raises $11 million.
- April: Peter Vidmar, olympic gymnast, speaks in the priesthood session of General Conference.
- April 19: Bruce R. McConkie dies.
- April 28: The Salamander Letter is made public, describing folk magic in early Mormonism and causing much controversy. Purporting to be an 1830 letter written by Martin Harris, it was later found to be a Mark Hofmann forgery.
- June 7: Groundbreaking for Triad 1 of the Triad Center. It is not finished, but it would have been the highest building in Utah.
- June 29: Freiberg Germany Temple opened in East Germany, the first and only temple behind the Iron Curtain, and the oldest in Germany.
- August 2: New hymnal is published.
- August 24: Johannesburg South Africa Temple is dedicated, the first temple in Africa. The country is still under apartheid at this time, creating controversy.
- October 10: M. Russell Ballard is ordained to the Quorum of the Twelve Apostles.
- October 15: Two Salt Lake City residents are killed by bombs laid by Mark Hofmann, a forger of Mormon historical documents, as a distraction to buy time as his debts mounted and schemes began to unravel.
- October 23: The Family History Library, near Temple Square in Salt Lake City, is dedicated.
- November 5: Spencer W. Kimball dies.
- November 10: Ezra Taft Benson becomes the 13th president of the LDS Church.

=== 1986 ===
- October: The general women's meeting is first held, and would continue on the Saturday before General Conference.
- October 4: Stake quorums of Seventy are dissolved.
- October 9: Joseph B. Wirthlin is ordained to the Quorum of the Twelve Apostles.
- Arabic edition of Book of Mormon.
- Protests against BYU president in Jerusalem by Jewish groups, shouting slogans such as "Conversion is Murder!" and "Mormons, stop your mission now".

=== 1987 ===
- January 7: Mark Hofmann pleads guilty to murder, forgery, and fraud. His past discoveries are called into question, including many relating to Mormon history.
- September 18: Mormon Tabernacle Choir performs at the US Constitution's bicentennial celebration at Independence Hall in Philadelphia.
- Seagull Book book founded.

=== 1988 ===
- May 15: A stake is created at Aba, Nigeria, the first in West Africa.
- May 20: Marion G. Romney, president of the Quorum of the Twelve Apostles, dies.
- August: The 100 millionth proxy temple endowment for the dead is performed.
- October: The General Conference at this time marks the point at which women would be included as speakers in every General Conference going forward.
- October 1: Richard G. Scott is sustained to the Quorum of the Twelve Apostles.
- Hebrew edition of Book of Mormon, later withdrawn.

=== 1989 ===
- April 1: The Second Quorum of the Seventy is created, its members being term-limited to 3–5 years.
- May 16: Brigham Young University Jerusalem Center dedicated.
- May 24: A terrorist organization, Zarate Willka Armed Forces of Liberation, assassinates two missionaries of the Church of Jesus Christ of Latter-day Saints as they return to their apartment.
- September 1: George P. Lee, the first Native American general authority is excommunicated.
- November 25: Announcement that local ward and stake budgets will be funded by general Church funds, from tithing, and will no longer have assessments.
- LDS Church membership surpasses seven million.

== 1990s ==
=== 1990 ===
- March 31: Helvécio Martins becomes first black general authority.
- April 2: The release of FamilySearch software, which allows Family History Centers to access the church's genealogical resources on CD-ROM.
- April: Wording of endowment and temple ceremony altered, and wording changed to remove penalty oaths.
- November 20: Costs are equalized for all missionaries, so all pay the same amount regardless of where they are serving, effective January 1, 1991.

=== 1991 ===
- May 1: The 500,000th LDS missionary is called.
- May 31: LDS Church membership surpasses eight million.
- June 8–29: The Mormon Tabernacle Choir performs through a tour of Eastern Europe and Russia, amidst the thaw in the Cold War, fostering goodwill and publicity just months before the dissolution of the Soviet Union.
- June 24: The LDS Church is granted formal recognition in Russia.
- December: The Encyclopedia of Mormonism is published. A joint production of BYU and Macmillan, it holds 1,500 entries from over 730 contributors.
- December 26: Collapse of the USSR, end of Cold War and start of CIS. Missionaries increase in the region.

=== 1992 ===
- March 14: The Relief Society celebrates its 150th anniversary with a worldwide satellite broadcast from the Salt Lake Tabernacle. At this meeting, the Gospel Literacy Effort is announced, which endorsed UNESCO's International Literacy Day.
- October 3: Gordon B. Hinckley announces Harrison New York Temple. Construction never started and all efforts for this project were eventually suspended; it was removed from the list on the LDS Church's official temple website soon after the dedication of the Manhattan New York Temple.
- December 26-January 6: The Mormon Tabernacle Choir performs for a tour of Israel.

=== 1993 ===
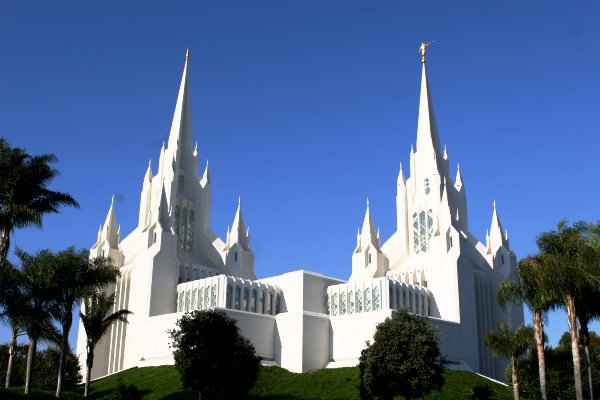
The San Diego California Temple is dedicated.

- February 7: Howard W. Hunter is taken hostage while preparing to speak at a fireside in the Brigham Young University Marriott Center. Cody Judy rushed onto the rostrum and threatened Hunter and the audience of 15,000–17,000, claiming the briefcase he held contained a bomb. Judy demanded that Hunter read a document over the pulpit, which Hunter refused to do. The audience spontaneously sang We Thank Thee, O God, for a Prophet, during which students from the audience, and then security personnel, overtook Judy.
- April 25: The San Diego California Temple is dedicated.
- June 27: The Joseph Smith Memorial Building is dedicated near Temple Square in Salt Lake City.
- July 10: Steve Benson publicly states that his grandfather, church president Ezra Taft Benson, is suffering from senility, which is being concealed by church leadership. Later that year, Steve Benson publicly leaves the church.
- September: The September Six are excommunicated. They include the feminist Lavina Fielding Anderson and historian D. Michael Quinn.

=== 1994 ===
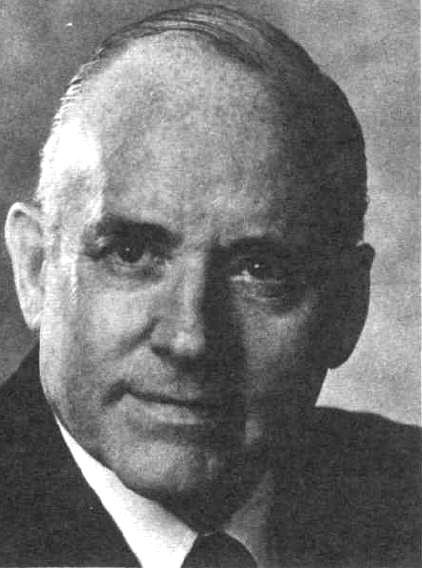
Howard W. Hunter becomes President of the Church.

- February 25: Marvin J. Ashton dies.
- April 7: Robert D. Hales is ordained to the Quorum of the Twelve Apostles.
- May 3: True and Living Church of Jesus Christ of Saints of the Last Days founded in response to a perceived apostasy in the LDS Church. As with many Mormon fundamentalist groups, they object to what they perceive as unauthorized changes to church doctrine and practices.
- May 30: Ezra Taft Benson dies.
- June 5: Howard W. Hunter becomes the 14th president of the LDS Church.
- June 23: Jeffrey R. Holland is ordained to the Quorum of the Twelve Apostles.
- December 11: The 2000th stake of the LDS Church is organized in Mexico City.
- Audio and internet versions of Book of Mormon launched.

=== 1995 ===
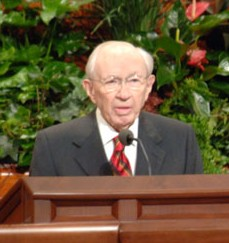
Gordon B. Hinckley becomes LDS Church president.

- March 3: Howard W. Hunter dies after serving only nine months as president.
- March 12: Gordon B. Hinckley becomes the 15th president of the LDS Church.
- April 6: Henry B. Eyring is ordained and set apart in the Quorum of the Twelve Apostles.
- April 1: The new office of Area Authority replaces regional representatives.
- May: Liahona magazine commences publication.
- September 23: "The Family: A Proclamation to the World" is published.
- After a controversy, a deal is struck between the Jewish and LDS communities to "Remove from the International Genealogical Index in the future the names of all deceased Jews who are so identified if they are known to be improperly included counter to Church policy".

=== 1996 ===
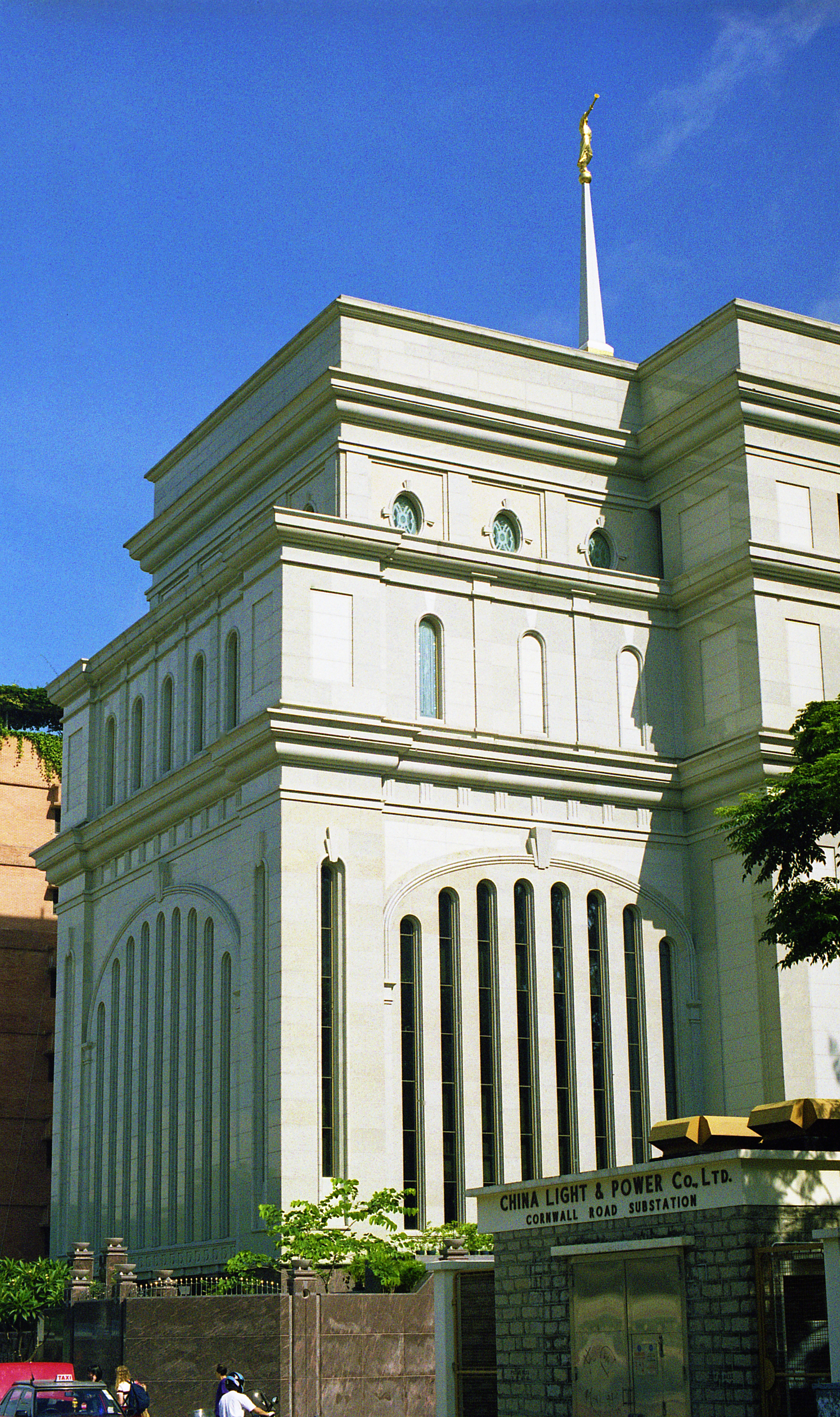
The Hong Kong China Temple is dedicated.

- January 18: General Authorities are no longer to serve on boards of directors for public or private corporations (with the exception of the church's Deseret Management Corporation).
- February 25: More LDS members live outside the United States than inside it.
- April 6: Gordon B. Hinckley announces plans for the LDS Conference Center.
- April 7: Gordon B. Hinckley is interviewed by Mike Wallace on the popular TV show 60 Minutes.
- May 26: Hong Kong China Temple dedicated. It is the first "high rise" temple due to land shortages.
- May 27–28: Gordon B. Hinckley visits mainland China, the first LDS Church president to do so.
- June 29: Gordon B. Hinckley, president of the LDS Church, receives the Golden Plate Award from the Academy of Achievement.
- December 9: Launch of lds.org, the official LDS Church website.
- Indian Placement Program ends.

=== 1997 ===
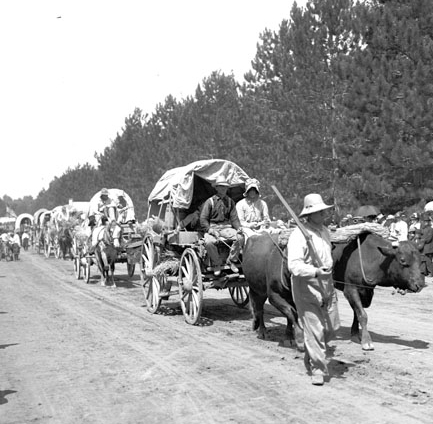
Reenactments celebrate the Utah pioneer sesquicentennial.

- April 5: Area authorities are to be ordained Seventies and organized into regional Third, Fourth, and Fifth Quorums of Seventy.
- June 1: The St. Louis Missouri Temple is dedicated and becomes the church's 50th operating temple.
- July 1: Hong Kong is transferred to the People's Republic of China. This makes the Hong Kong China Temple the first temple on PRC territory (although there are still heavy restrictions on the church in other parts of China). Due to the disintegration of East Germany, it is the only temple in a Communist run country.
- July 24: The sesquicentennial of the arrival of Mormon Pioneers in the Salt Lake Valley is celebrated, including an overland wagon train reenactment across the Mormon Trail, the opening of a new Mormon Trail Center at Winter Quarters, Nebraska, conferences and celebrations throughout the church, and a large scale media campaign by the church's Public Affairs Department.
- August 11: Gladys Knight, the famous American soul singer, converts to the LDS Church.
- October 4: New plan to build small temples in remote areas is announced by Gordon B. Hinckley in General Conference.
- October 23: The film Orgazmo, a sex-comedy about an LDS missionary, gains theatrical release.
- November: Foundation for Apologetic Information & Research (FAIR) founded
- November: LDS Church membership surpasses ten million.
- November 2: The Vernal Utah Temple is dedicated; it is the first temple to utilize a previously existing building.

=== 1998 ===
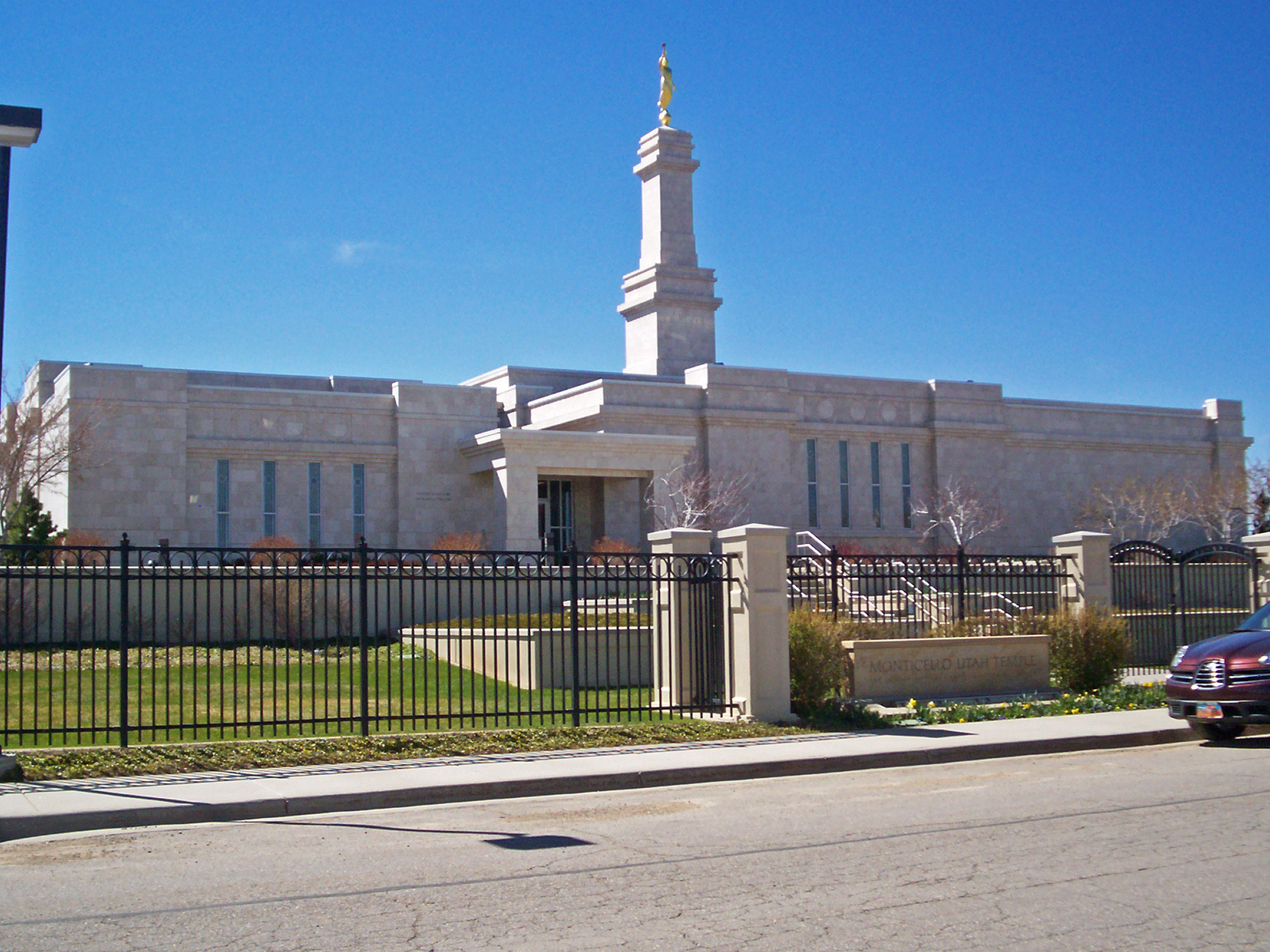
The Monticello Utah Temple was the first of the new, small design.

- January 4: New curriculum for Teachings of Presidents of the Church is used for Melchizedek Priesthood and Relief Society classes, beginning with Brigham Young.
- March 26–27: The Grandin Print Shop and rebuilt Smith Family Farm replica are dedicated in Palmyra, New York.
- April 5: 30 new small temples are announced by Gordon B. Hinckley at General Conference, for a total of 100 by the end of 2000.
- April 26: Gordon B. Hinckley addresses 20,000 church members gathered at Madison Square Garden in New York City.
- July 20: Plans for the Kyiv Ukraine Temple announced, the first in the former Soviet Union.
- July 26–27: The Monticello Utah Temple is dedicated, the first temple using the new smaller design announced in 1997.
- September 8: Gordon B. Hinckley is interviewed on the popular TV show Larry King Live.

=== 1999 ===
- January 14: Twenty-four-year-old De-Kieu Duy entered the Triad Center's broadcast house for KSL-TV and began shooting, killing one.
- April 4: The rebuilding of the Nauvoo Temple is announced by Gordon B. Hinckley at General Conference.
- April 15: A second Salt Lake City shooting incident kills two, this time at the LDS Church's Family History Library, a block away from the January shooting. The Triad Center is also evacuated due to a suspicious note in a nearby truck, later found to be unrelated.
- May 22: Mormon Youth Symphony and Chorus holds its last concert.
- May 24: FamilySearch.org website is launched, providing access to genealogical information.
- August 11: A tornado damages SLC historic sites, delays work on LDS Conference Center and narrowly misses the Salt Lake Temple. It occurred during an unusually strong summer monsoon season. It was the second tornado to hit in Utah that resulted in a fatality (the other occurring in 1884).
- October: The first live broadcast of General Conference on the internet.
- October 16: Orchestra at Temple Square holds first rehearsal.
- November 26: American Prophet: The Story of Joseph Smith, a documentary film, is broadcast on PBS.
- December 31: Zions Cooperative Mercantile Institution sold.

== See also ==
- Mormonism in the 19th century
- Mormonism in the 21st century

== Sources ==
- Beuys, Barbara (1987). Vergeßt uns nicht - Menschen im Widerstand 1933-1945 (in German). Berlin: Rowohlt Verlag. ISBN 3498005111.
- Bitton, Davis; Alexander, Thomas G. (2009), The A to Z of Mormonism, Scarecrow Press, ISBN 978-0-8108-6897-7
- Reeve, W. Paul; Parshall, Ardis E., eds. (2010), Mormonism: A Historical Encyclopedia, ABC-CLIO, ISBN 978-1-59884-107-7
