= Young Ambassadors =

Performing group from Brigham Young University

The Young Ambassadors are a song and dance performing group from Brigham Young University (BYU). Consisting of 20 performers, 10 male and 10 female, they were founded by Janie Thompson in 1969. Since their first international performance at the 1970 World Fair in Osaka, Japan, they have performed in over 68 countries.

== History ==
Ernest L. Wilkinson, then president of BYU, asked Janie Thompson, who had just returned from a mission for the Church of Jesus Christ of Latter-day Saints (LDS Church), to found the Program Bureau in 1952. She accepted Wilkinson's request, though she had to reject an offer from the Ike Carpenter band. BYU was invited to send a group to represent the United States at the 1970 World Fair in Osaka, Japan. Assisted by Harry Schultz, Thompson had created a performing group in 1969 called the Brigham Young Ambassadors. "Brigham" was dropped from the name in 1970 and the group became known as Young Ambassadors. Randy Boothe, a future director of the group, was recruited for the show. The audience received the group well and the Young Ambassadors continued to receive invitations to perform in front of international audiences. Before a tour, group members study the language and culture of the countries they tour so they can better interact with the people in the country.

Since their first international performance at world exposition 1970 in Osaka, Japan, they have performed their musical variety show throughout the United States and over 68 other nations. Their audiences have included the prime minister of India, the queen of Thailand, and the king and queen of Jordan. Live and televised appearances in major concert halls and impromptu performances in hospitals, orphanages, town squares and government palaces reach millions of people each year.

The Young Ambassadors company consists of 20 performers (10 men and 10 women), a 10 piece show band (keyboard, drums, guitar and bass guitar, etc.) and technical personnel. The Young Ambassadors were directed by Randy Boothe from 1978 to 2020. Nathan Balser was appointed by BYU as his successor and presently directs the Young Ambassadors.

== Impact ==
The Young Ambassadors were the first organized group to represent the Church of Jesus Christ of Latter-day Saints (LDS Church) or BYU in the Soviet Union.

In a 1991 speech at BYU, Dallin H. Oaks discussed how the Young Ambassadors overcame the challenges of trying to perform in China in 1978. The challenges were due to the lack of diplomatic relations between China and the United States at the time and the fact that United States tourists were not welcome there. Oaks related the 1978 tour and subsequent tours of the Young Ambassadors to China as contributive to missionary work of LDS Church in China and around the world. Chinese nobility were impressed by the Young Ambassadors, and continued to let them perform in China, even when visits from other performing groups were cancelled. Along with Oaks, French scholar Pierre Vendassi agreed that the performances of the Young Ambassadors in Beijing and other Chinese cities helped establish a relationship between China and the LDS Church.

== Past members ==
- Sharlene Wells Hawkes, Miss America 1985
- Candese Marchese, Eponine in Broadway cast of Les Misérables
- Christeena Michelle Riggs, Eponine in Broadway cast of Les Misérables, Cosette in the 10th Anniversary Production.
- Dan Truman, country music group Diamond Rio keyboardist
- Emily Tyndall, actress in Napoleon Dynamite
- Dallyn Vail Bayles, LDS recording artist, Understudy of Phantom and Raoul in Phantom of the Opera US Tour, Enjolras in US National Tour of Les Mis
- Jeff Whiting, associate choreographer to Susan Stroman, founder of Open Jar Institute in NY, creator of Stage Write Software
- Summer Naomi Smart, Joseph Jefferson Award winning actress

== Directors ==
Harry Schultz, Director 1970 - 1974

- Randy Boothe, Artistic Director
- Eric Hansen, Band Director
- Ron Simpson, Associate Director (retired)
- Janielle Christensen, Assistant Artistic Director
- John Shurtleff, Technical Director

== Tour history ==
This tour history begins in 1970 and continues up to present day.

- 1970 Japan (Osaka World Exposition)
- 1972 California, Alberta, Idaho, Utah, Wyoming, Montana, Eastern United States
- 1972-1973 New Mexico, Mexico, Guatemala, Costa Rica, Colombia, Peru, Bolivia, Argentina, Uruguay, Brazil, El Salvador
- 1973-1974 Midwestern United States, Southern California, Nevada, Utah
- 1975 Utah, Arizona, California, Northern California, Eastern United States, Canada
- 1975-1976 Southern United States, Central United States, Alberta, California, Nevada, Utah
- 1977 Arizona, Netherlands, Germany, France, Belgium, Switzerland
- 1978 California, Utah, New Mexico, Texas, Central Canada, Midwestern United States, Eastern United States
- 1979 Arizona, New Mexico, California, Northern United States, Canada, Poland, Austria, Germany, Switzerland, People's Republic of China, Republic of China Hong Kong, Guam, Hawaii, California
- 1980 India, Nepal, Sri Lanka, Arizona, New Mexico, Southern United States, Hawaii, People's Republic of China, Philippines, Hong Kong, Taiwan.
- 1980-1981 Romania, Egypt, Greece, Northern California, Colorado, Wyoming, Denmark, Iceland, Sweden, Finland, Norway
- 1981-1982 Arizona, Northwest United States, India, Sri Lanka, San Diego, California (Holiday Bowl), Southern California, Egypt, Turkey, Jordan, New York, Tennessee World Exposition,
- 1983 Utah, Southern California, Idaho, Washington, California (twice), Nevada, Japan, People's Republic of China, Republic of China, Thailand, Singapore, Malaysia, Australia, New Zealand, Tahiti, Hawaii
- 1984 Arizona, Utah, Southern California, Louisiana World Exposition, Southern United States, Northeastern United States
- 1985 Southern California, Nevada, Northern California, Yugoslavia, Italy, France, Spain, Portugal, Austria, Egypt, Jordan, Turkey, Greece, Jerash
- 1986 California, India, Nepal, Sri Lanka, Canada
- 1987-1988 Colorado, Missouri, Pennsylvania, New Jersey, New York, Washington D.C., New Hampshire, Maine, New Brunswick, Prince Edward Island, Nova Scotia, Quebec, Ontario, Ohio, Illinois, Idaho, Oregon, Washington, United Kingdom, Ireland
- 1988-1989 Northern California, Georgia, Florida, Puerto Rico, Dominican Republic, Jamaica
- 1989-1990 Utah, Nevada, California, Denmark, Norway, Sweden, Finland
- 1991 New Mexico, Texas, Soviet Union
- 1991-1992 Arizona, Colorado, Kansas, Missouri, Arkansas, Tennessee, North Carolina, Virginia, Washington D.C., Pennsylvania, West Virginia, Ohio, Kentucky
- 1992-1993 Northern Nevada, California, Russia, Lithuania, Latvia, Estonia
- 1993-1994 Pacific Northwest, Spain, Morocco, Tunisia, Egypt
- 1994-1995 Colorado, Wyoming, Nebraska, Kansas, Missouri, Illinois, Iowa, Minnesota
- 1996 Southern California, Vietnam, Hong Kong, People's Republic of China, Philippines, Malaysia
- 1997 Arizona, Morocco, Tunisia
- 1998 California, South Africa, Swaziland, Botswana
- 1999 Washington, Oregon, Idaho, Singapore, Malaysia, Thailand, China
- 2000 California, Nevada, Colorado, Texas, Oklahoma, Arkansas, Tennessee, Alabama, Georgia
- 2001 Arizona, Far East Russia, Japan
- 2002 Oregon, Washington, British Columbia, Alberta, Canada
- 2003 California, Northern Nevada
- 2004 Southern Nevada, California, Brazil, Argentina
- 2005 Colorado, New Mexico, Hong Kong, China, South Korea
- 2006 Arizona, Texas, Oklahoma, Kansas, Missouri, Illinois
- 2007 China, Idaho, Washington, Oregon
- 2008 Australia, Tasmania, Nevada, Southern California
- 2009 New Mexico, Texas, Denmark, Norway, Sweden, Finland
- 2010 Arizona, Illinois
- 2011 North Carolina, South Carolina, Tennessee, Virginia, Alabama, Georgia, Florida, Cuba, Nevada, California
- 2012 South Africa, Botswana, Swaziland
- 2013 Idaho, Washington, Oregon
- 2013-2014 Thailand, Vietnam, Cambodia, China
- 2015 Nevada, California, Nauvoo, Illinois
- 2016 Wyoming, Colorado, South Africa, Zimbabwe
- 2017 Brazil
- 2018 Utah, Arizona
- 2018-2019 Southern California, People's Republic of China

== Recordings ==
=== Albums ===
Information retrieved from BYU Music Store.

- Tapestry: Weaving the Colors of Life (1993)
- Of One Heart (1995)
- The Neighborhood (1997)
- Come Unto Him: A Young Ambassadors Fireside Devotional (1999)
- Curtain Time (2000)
- Broadway Rhythm (2002)
- The Lord is My Light (2003)
- Circle of Life (2005)
- The New American Songbook (2008)
- Harmony: The Music of Life (2012)
- Heartsongs: Melodies of Love (2014)
- Welcome Home (2018)

=== Singles ===
Information retrieved from Apple Music.

- Chicago Medley (2017)
- Yorktown: The World Turned Upside Down (2017)
- My Heavenly Father Loves Me (2016)
- Thinking Out Loud (2016)
- What Christmas Means to Me (2014)

=== Videos ===
- Let it Ring (1987) on VHS
- Heartsongs: Melodies of Love (2014) on DVD
