= Indian Placement Program =

LDS Church program

The Indian Placement Program (IPP) or Indian Student Placement Program (ISPP), also called the Lamanite Placement Program, was operated by the Church of Jesus Christ of Latter-day Saints (LDS Church) in the United States, officially operating from 1954 and virtually closed by 1996. It had its peak during the 1960s and 1970s. Native American students who were baptized members of the LDS Church were placed in foster homes of LDS members during the school year. They attended majority-white public schools, rather than the Indian boarding schools or local schools on the reservations. The program's goal was to "introduce Native Americans to mainstream values and social roles without demanding the abandonment of the old for the new."

The program was developed according to LDS theology, whereby conversion and assimilation to Mormonism could help Native Americans, who had been classified as Lamanites in terms of theology in the Book of Mormon. An estimated 50,000 Native American children went through the program. The foster placement was intended to help develop leadership among Native Americans and assimilate them into majority-American culture. The cost of care was borne by the foster parents, and financially stable families were selected by the church. Most of these placements took place on the Navajo Nation, with a peak participation of 5,000 students in 1972. The program decreased in size after the 1970s, due to criticism, changing mores among Native Americans, and restriction of the program to high school students as schools improved on reservations. Many of the students and families praised the program; others criticized it and the LDS Church for weakening the Native Americans' ties to their own cultures.

In 2016 through 2018, ten plaintiffs filed suit in the Navajo Nation Tribal Court, alleging they had been sexually abused while in the foster program, and the LDS Church did not adequately protect them. The cases were settled in 2018.

== History ==
=== Precursors ===
During the earliest days of the LDS Church in Utah, Mormons often raised Native American children in their homes. Leader Brigham Young advocated buying children held by Native Americans and Mexican traders as slaves (a legal practice in the Utah Territory prior to the American Civil War), freeing them from slavery, and encouraged Latter-day Saints to educate and acculturate the children as if they were their own.

LDS theology suggests that the Native Americans have a special status. It held that Book of Mormon people had two distinct phenotypes: Nephites, who initially "were a civil and a delightsome people;" and Lamanites, who were at times "wild, and ferocious, and a blood-thirsty people." In the Book of Mormon narrative, the Lamanites ultimately became the more righteous of the two groups as the Nephites fell into apostasy and were destroyed. The Book of Mormon insists that the Lamanites would survive the destruction of the Nephites and would, in turn, be "brought unto salvation", and be "[restored] again to the knowledge of the truth".

The Indian Student Placement Program (ISPP) of the mid-20th century developed from an informal placement in 1947 in Richfield, Utah, by the LDS Church. A 16-year-old Navajo teenager, Helen John, asked permission to stay in the city to go to school. As a result, Golden Buchanan and Miles Jensen organized an informal placement program under the direction of Spencer W. Kimball, who was raised in southeastern Arizona, was the chairman of the church's Committee on Indian Relationships. With her parents' permission, Helen was allowed to stay with the Buchanan family, whom she knew in Richfield. This arrangement was not an official program, but it was the basis for the Indian Placement Program that would later be established. The Buchanans agreed to take in other children as well, and that year three students were placed into the unofficial program. These arrangements continued, and by 1954 there were some 68 Native American students (mostly from the Navajo Nation) placed into foster homes in four different western states.

The ISPP worked to instill Western notions of industry through the imposition of an ethno-religious identity. The Lamanite identity defined Indians as culturally and spiritually apostate Israelites destined for latter-day restoration through an internalized Protestant work ethic. Although some rejected this theological identity others found it a point of strength and empowerment as they attended schools and participated in specific ISPP efforts to develop Western leadership patterns among Native American participants.

=== Organization of the Indian Placement Program ===
The success of these students led to the church establishing a formal placement program in July 1954, under the Church Social Services, which was part of the Relief Society. Under this program, a social worker was assigned to each Native American foster child. A reception center was built in Richfield to accommodate the large numbers of participants. Buses and other transportation were arranged to bring children to the center where they would be fed, receive medical examinations, and be introduced to their foster families. Students participated from the Navajo Nation and other tribes in the Southwest, as well as some from other parts of the United States.

When the program became institutionalized, there were some complaints that LDS missionaries were assigned to recruit new participants. In 1956, the Bureau of Indian Affairs received complaints that the placement program was being used to increase the church's proselytizing efforts. The governments of Utah and Arizona in March 1957 met with church representatives to address the issue. As a result, caseworkers rather than missionaries were given the responsibility of making the final decision for acceptance of students into the Indian Placement Program.

In order for children to participate in the program, their parents had to request their placement. Foster parents were recommended by local bishops and were expected to provide free room, board, and clothing for the Native American children. These children had to be at least eight years old, baptized as members of The Church of Jesus Christ of Latter-day Saints, and be in good standing in the church and in good health.

In October 1960, Kimball discussed the program at the General Conference. He said that Natives who participated in the program were gradually turning lighter, becoming "white and delightsome". "The day of the Lamanites is nigh", Kimball said, claiming that Navajo placement students were "as light as Anglos" and, in one case, several shades lighter than parents "on the same reservation, in the same hogan, subject to the same sun and wind and weather."

==== Development ====
Some families had their children baptized in the church in order to gain the opportunity to go to school off the reservation. To avoid this, in the 1950s and 1960s, the church added new requirements for acceptance of children into the program. In 1969, the Unified Social Services was established in the church; this became the administrative body to run the Indian Placement Program. In 1973 it was renamed and organized as LDS Social Services.

By 1972, nearly 5,000 Native Americans were living in foster homes through this program. Some students went on to study at Brigham Young University (BYU), earning college degrees. In 1971 they created a performance group of singers and dancers called "The Lamanite Generation" but later renamed Living Legends. Among their pieces was "Go My Son", a song referring to the "ladder of education", written by Arliene Nofchissey and Carnes Burson.

In 1972 local priesthood leaders were given the responsibility for recruiting and screening new students. Due to strong criticism and rising Native American activism, the program had nearly been discontinued in 1977. The US government commissioned a study under the Interstate Compact Secretariat, which oversaw educational efforts. It heard much praise from Native American families for the program. After assessing the program results and hearing testimonial from participants and foster families, the church decided to continue it.

After 1972, the number of students that participated in the program decreased. By the late 1970s, the number of participants in the Indian Placement Program was around 2,500. In response to the improvement of local schools developed on the reservations in preference to boarding schools, in the 1980s the Indian Placement Program limited participants to high-school students; the number of students dropped to 500 in 1990. In 1996 there were virtually no more participants, although the last graduated in 2000.

In the 1970s, the Indian Placement Program was directed to emphasize creating stronger bonds and increased communication between the natural families and the selected foster families. The goal of the program was to "introduce Native Americans to mainstream values and social roles without demanding the abandonment of the old for the new." According to the Maxwell Institute of BYU, it attempted to help Native Americans receive more formal education and training, while helping them maintain their identity.

== Results ==
At least three studies of the outcomes of the IPP, published in 1977, 1997, and 2025, have reported mostly positive results, and relied primarily on interviews of Native Americans involved.

The 1997 study gathered the oral histories of twenty-three participants from the Navajo Reservation in order to better understand the effects of the IPP. All of the subjects were around 33 years old at the time of the study and were born on the Navajo reservation. The sample consisted of 22 interviewees. The group consisted of seven men and fifteen women. At any one time, this ratio indicated the Program's ratio. All of them had completed high school, ten had attended college, and four had received college diplomas. When the program began, all of the participants were of varying ages. Fourteen of the students were under the age of ten, eighteen were under the age of thirteen, and the remaining three were in their senior or junior year of high school. Fourteen percent had three or more foster families, 43 percent had a single foster family, and another 43 percent had two separate foster families. According to the study, the average length of time spent in the program was about seven years. The participants in the study all reported being members of the Church of Jesus Christ of Latter-day Saints.

The results reported were predominantly success stories. As recorded, about one-third of the participants stayed in the program until graduation from high school. 40 percent of students decided to drop out of the program, and 15 percent of students left the program because of their parents' wishes or needs. Students who did drop out were still more likely to finish high school than were Native American peers who had not participated in the program. Students in the Indian Placement Program had an 82 percent graduation rate. Studies found that the "longer students remained in the program, the more likely they were to be employed and to earn high incomes" and also to marry. One review of studies and the program's history summarized: "The program was impressively successful so far as its educational goals were concerned, but the record was less impressive when it came to religiosity."

The 2025 study gathered the oral histories of 20 participants and 25 other parties. Three main themes emerged: positive and negative experiences with education, the LDS baptism requirement, and relationships within foster families.

Not many studies of the outcomes of the IPP have been conducted by Native Americans, but at least one survey of the program was published in Indian Country Today News.

The church's new four-volume history, Saints: The Story of the Church of Jesus Christ in the Latter Days, follows the story of Maeta Holiday, who was born on the Navajo Reservation. The history follows Holiday's situation on the reservation, her years in Los Angeles in the IPP with her 1972 high school graduation at age 18, and her entrance to BYU.

== Criticism ==
Beginning in the 1970s the Indian Placement Program was increasingly criticized. In 1977, the U.S. government commissioned a study to investigate accusations that the church was using its influence to push children into joining the program. The commission found that the program was largely positive, and enjoyed emphatic support both from Native American parents and white foster parents. Critics "view intervention as an intrusion on the right to be fully Native American, a weakening of cultural pluralism, and a cause of psychological damage."

=== Sexual abuse litigation ===
In the spring of 2016, two plaintiffs filed suit in the Window Rock District of the Navajo Nation District Court (a tribal court), alleging they had been sexually abused for years while in the foster program, roughly from the years 1965 to 1983, and the LDS Church did not adequately protect them. The church filed suit in federal district court in Salt Lake City, alleging that the Tribal Court did not have jurisdiction and seeking an injunction "to stay the proceedings from moving forward under tribal jurisdiction." Federal district court judge Robert Shelby denied the church's motion to dismiss and also ruled that it first had to "exhaust all remedies" in Tribal Court. This is considered a major victory for tribal jurisprudence.

In total, ten plaintiffs filed suit between 2016 and 2018. After primarily disputing over tribal versus federal jurisdiction of the cases, rather than proceeding to trial, the cases of all but one of the plaintiffs were settled between the parties in 2018.

== See also ==
- American Indian outing programs
- Baby Scoop Era
- Cultural assimilation of Native Americans
- Indian Relocation Act of 1956
- Native American boarding schools
- Sixties Scoop
