= Jay E. Welch =

Jay Evard Welch (November 6, 1925 – December 15, 2008) was an American musician who was a music director of the Mormon Tabernacle Choir (MTC), a longtime University of Utah (U of U) professor, founder of the Mormon Youth Symphony and Chorus (MYSC), Jay Welch Chorale and the Salt Lake Repertory Orchestra. He was a member of the Church of Jesus Christ of Latter-day Saints.

Welch was born in Salt Lake City on November 6, 1925, to Jesse Evard and Pearl Snow Welch. He served in the Navy during World War II and the Korean War. He married Marcelle Beecher in Salt Lake City on March 21, 1951, and together they had six daughters.

Welch graduated from UCLA with a major in mathematics and minor in music. He continued his music studies at the Paris Conservatory of Music, graduated with a master's degree in composition from Mills College in Oakland, California, and earned a Ph.D. in 1959 from the U of U, where he taught for 39 years before retiring in 1993. Besides teaching music theory and other classes to music majors, Welch taught music appreciation to thousands of non-majors. In 2004, the U of U's Emeritus Alumni Association awarded him the prestigious Merit of Honor Award.

In 1957, Welch was named assistant conductor to Richard P. Condie, the music director of the MTC. Welch was appointed to be the first music director of the MYSC in 1969. In 1974, succeeded Condie as the MTC's music director, a position he held for only six months, due to an unexpected illness.

He died on December 15, 2008, at the age of 83 in Salt Lake City.
