= Emily Dunn (actress) =

American actress

- Born: Emily Kennard; Salt Lake City, Utah, U.S.
- Years active: 1997–present
- Spouse(s): Spencer Tyndall (2004–08; divorced); Adam Dunn (2009–present)
- Children: 5
- Website: http://www.theemilydunn.com

Emily Dunn (née Kennard; formerly Tyndall) is an American actress and dancer from Salt Lake City, Utah, who made her acting debut as Trisha in Napoleon Dynamite in 2004, under her maiden name Emily Kennard.

The youngest of six children, she began dancing at age three, drawing at age 4, singing and acting at age 8. When she was 15, she began competing International Standard and International Latin. At age 19, Emily earned a position on the Young Ambassadors, an international performing group for Brigham Young University (BYU). She traveled across the United States and also to Brazil and Argentina performing a show called Broadway Rhythm. At BYU, she attended acting classes with future co-star Jon Heder.

== Personal life ==
She graduated in April 2005 from Brigham Young University with a Bachelor of Fine Arts in illustration. She currently works for Disney as an Art Manager at a video game development studio. She was first married to Spencer Tyndall from 2004 to 2008; the couple divorced. She remarried on March 19, 2009, to Adam Dunn, with whom she has five children, twin daughters Emmylou and Dani, born in March 2011, sons Matthew Griffin, born in August 2013, and Kaden Alexander, born in June 2015.

== Filmography ==
- Napoleon Dynamite – Trisha (as Emily Kennard)
- White Noise (2005) - Julietta (as Emily Tyndall)
- The Hills Have Eyes 2 - Andrea Rose (as Emily Tyndall)
- By the Way (Theory of a Deadman song) (music video)- Girl (as Emily Tyndall)
- My Girlfriend's Boyfriend (2010) – Jamie (as Emily Dunn)
- Setup (2011) - Cassandra Long, Vincent's girlfriend-turned fiancee
- Forever Strong – Jamie (as Emily Tyndall)
- Pirates of the Great Salt Lake – Ruby (as Emily Tyndall)
- Reflections in the Mud – Phonius Operator (as Emily Tyndall)
- Crossroads – Kimberly (as Emily Tyndall)
- The Black Phone - Georgia (as Emily Tyndall- Dunn)

== Video games ==
- Hannah Montana: Spotlight World Tour (2007) – game designer, artist, actress, dancer, choreographer
- Meet the Robinsons (2007) – artist
- Chicken Little: Ace in Action (2006) – artist
- Chicken Little (2005) – artist
- Tak: The Great Juju Challenge (2005) – artist
- Tak 2: The Staff of Dreams (2004) – artist
- Tak and the Power of Juju (2003) – artist
- Rugrats: Royal Ransom (2002) – artist

== Theater ==
- Christmas Without Mr. C – Musical by Janeen Brady, Role: Maude (Head Elf)
- Meet Me in St. Louis – Role: Rose

== Discography ==
- Journey
- Lord is My Light – Young Ambassadors
