= Janie Thompson =

- Born: August 20, 1921; Malta, Idaho
- Died: June 1, 2013 (aged 91); Orem, Utah
- Education: Brigham Young University
- Parents: J. Henry Thompson (father); Lora Harmon Thompson (mother)

Janie Thompson (August 20, 1921 – June 1, 2013) was a performer. She was a professor at Brigham Young University and the founding director of the BYU Young Ambassadors and the Lamanite Generation (now known as Living Legends) performance groups. She was an active member of the Church of Jesus Christ of Latter-day Saints (LDS Church) and served as a missionary in Wales.

Thompson was born August 20, 1921, to J. Henry Thompson and Lora Harmon. She grew up in Malta, Idaho. She was the oldest of seven children. Thompson's mother was a singer and dancer, until a train accident left her unable to continue dancing. She would think of choreography and have Thompson dance out the steps for her. Her father sang bass. There was one piano in her house growing up, but her family could not afford lessons, so Thompson taught herself to play. She first performed at age 14. She attended Raft River High School and graduated in 1939.

Thompson was accepted to Brigham Young University (BYU) in 1939. She worked as a pianist, playing in dance classes, to put herself through college. and graduated in 1943 with a music degree. She associated with the Army Cadet Marching Band which helped launch her career when she was asked to be their lead female singer.

== Career ==
After graduating, Thompson taught music for some time at Timpanogos Elementary School in Provo, Utah. She quit her teaching job to go to California, where Thompson entered a singing competition in San Francisco. She became a Civilian Actress Technician, allowing her to perform for the Army of Occupation. She toured Europe, performing for soldiers in World War II with the 314th Army Special Service Band. She performed weekly at the Wiesbaden Opera House, and also performed with Tony Bennett. She returned to the United States in 1947 and performed with Ike Carpenter. She was then called on a mission for the LDS Church to Wales in 1950.

Thompson returned to the U.S. and she went to BYU to establish the Student Program Bureau in 1952 at the request of Ernest L. Wilkinson. She accepted the position although she also received a job offer to continue working with Ike Carpenter the same day. Although she did not want to accept the job with her own career beginning, she felt that she was supposed to take the job. During her first four years at BYU, Thompson put on over 2,000 shows. She traveled to all the high schools in Utah, while also helping with youth productions with the Young Women's organization in the church. She also served for a time as a member of the YWMIA General Board.

She left BYU in 1956, when she went to New York City to be a talent coach at a professional talent studio. In New York, Thompson taught music lessons on Long Island and trained children to sing. She was offered jobs writing musical commercials, but she returned to the university in 1959.

Throughout her time at BYU, Thompson helped direct performances and even organized performances for U.S. servicemen. She was the founder of several performing groups, including Young Ambassadors and Lamanite Generation (currently Living Legends) which tour internationally today. She not only helped produce shows, but she also wrote some shows as well, publishing over 100 musical works. She launched BYU's first international tour in 1960. She officially retired from BYU in 1984; however, she maintained a studio at BYU after retirement. She continued to help with musical productions until her death.

Some of her students were Heather Young, Sally Flynn and Sandi Griffiths from The Lawrence Welk Show, and Joseph Runningfox.

== Later life ==
She was involved with America's Freedom Festival in Provo, Utah, for several years. Although she never married and did not have children of her own, she strove to help each of her students reach their full potential. She continued composing music and helping with productions up until her death. Her students remembered her as a stern taskmaster that was filled with love. She died on June 1, 2013, in Orem, Utah.
