= Book of Mormon Historic Publication Site =

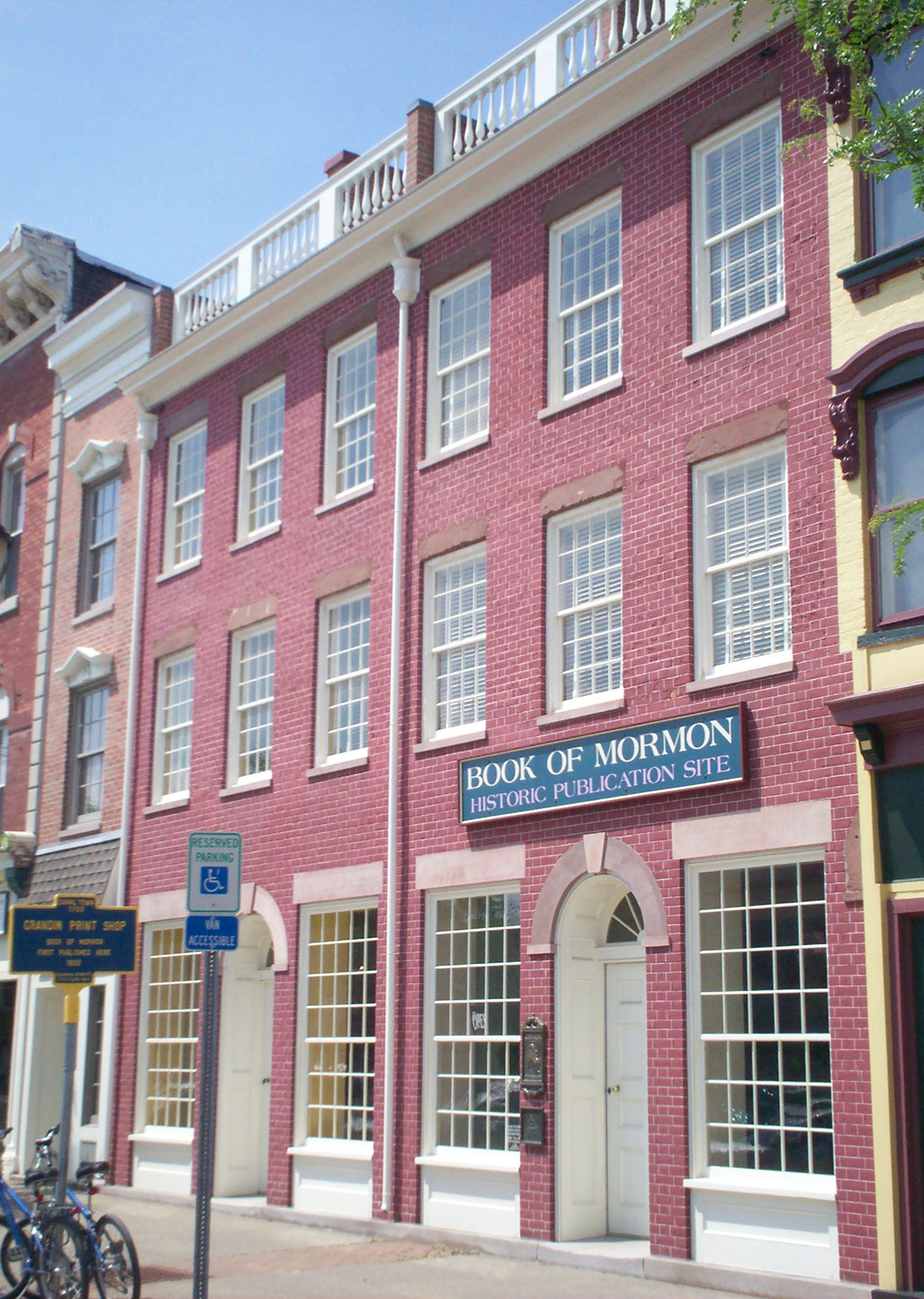

- Site location within New York, USA
- 43.063785°N 77.230640°W
- Location: 217 East Main Street; Palmyra Village, Wayne County, New York, United States

History
- Years of significance: 1829–1830
- Built: 1828

Site notes
- Elevation: 575 feet (175 m)
- Restored: 1994–1998
- Governing body: The Church of Jesus Christ of Latter-day Saints

The Book of Mormon Historic Publication Site is a historic site located in the village of Palmyra, New York, United States. The historic site includes the E. B. Grandin Building and some neighboring structures. It was in the E. B. Grandin building that Egbert B. Grandin printed and sold the first copies of the Book of Mormon. Because of the building's historical significance to Latter Day Saints, The Church of Jesus Christ of Latter-day Saints (LDS Church) purchased it in 1978. In the mid-1990s the church restored the Grandin building, while remodeling and adding to some neighboring structures to create a visitors' center.

== History ==
Egbert B. Grandin's printing press and bookshop was located in the westernmost building of a complex originally known as Thayer and Grandin Brick Row, and later as Exchange Row. The complex of buildings was constructed in 1828, between Palmyra's Main Street and the newly finished Erie Canal (which has since been moved north), by Joel Thayer, Levi Thayer, and Phillip Grandin. Phillip Grandin was the older brother of E. B. Grandin, and soon after the complex was completed E. B. Grandin moved his business into what would become known as the E. B. Grandin Building.

Grandin's bookshop and office were housed on the building's first floor, his book bindery and an attorney's office on the second floor, and the printing equipment — including two printing presses — on the third floor. In 1829 when Grandin was asked to publish the Book of Mormon, he was the publisher of The Wayne Sentinel newspaper. Eventually Grandin closed his bookshop and printing service, and the building has since housed numerous businesses. Both the building's interior and exterior were remodeled and updated several times through the years, including building additions, adding walls, new stairwells, dropped ceilings, plumbing, electrical systems, etc.

The E. B. Grandin Building, along with a neighboring structure, was purchased by the Church of Jesus Christ of Latter-day Saints in October 1978 from Paul Cherry. Soon after the purchase, the first floor in both buildings were remodeled to serve as a visitors' center. During Palmyra's Canal Days celebration, computers with access to FamilySearch databases were set up in the building to allow visitors to research their genealogy.

=== Restoration ===
During December 1993 the LDS Church's First Presidency announced the visitors' center would close sometime the following year to allow the building to be restored, and the visitors' center improved. On November 20, 1994 the center was closed, to allow final research to be completed and work to begin on the restoration.

Prior to the building's closure, and during the restoration, extensive historical and archaeological research was completed. As the archaeological investigations were underway in the building, it was found that much of the original plaster and woodwork remained, along with original floors and windows. The layout of the building was discovered by looking at wear patterns left in the original wooden floor. Ink smudges were also discovered on the walls of the third floor, and are believed to date to the period when the building was occupied by Grandin.

On the exterior of the building, non-original Italianate style decoration, such as architrave moldings, were removed. Old layers of paint were also removed, and it was found that originally the brick had been painted in a red glaze with painted mortar joints; this gave the building a uniform, crisp look. A similar red glaze with white mortar joints was painted on the building during the restoration. Older additions were removed from the rear of the building, and a new addition, to be part of the visitors' center, was constructed in their place.

Gordon B. Hinckley, president of the LDS Church, dedicated the restored building and adjoining visitors' center on March 26, 1998, the anniversary of when the Book of Mormon went on sale. The building is open free of charge, for daily tours given by church missionaries. Grandin's press was replicated at the Crandall Historical Printing Museum in Provo, Utah.

== Publication of the Book of Mormon ==
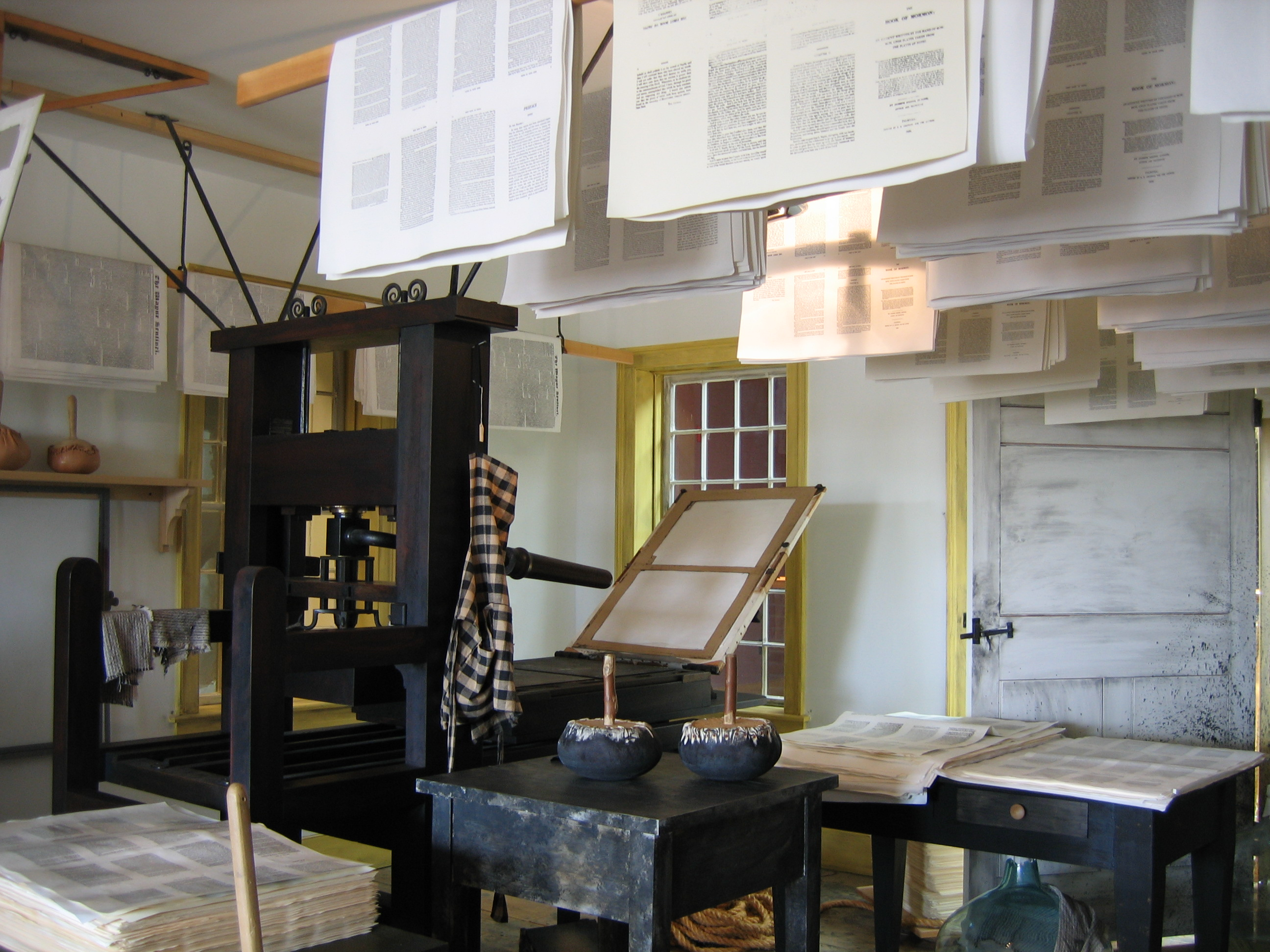
One of the two printing presses located on the third floor

When Joseph Smith, Jr. originally requested that Grandin print the Book of Mormon, he refused to do so, believing it to be a risky financial venture and considered the book to be fraudulent. Smith then sought a printer in nearby Rochester to do the job. There he found printer Elihu F. Marshall, who was willing to publish the book. But prior to signing an agreement with Marshall, Smith once again appealed to Grandin, telling him the publication would occur anyway. Grandin then agreed to print 5,000 copies of the book. Later after more worries arose, Grandin halted publication until he received a USD $3,000 security payment. Martin Harris, a well-to-do farmer and early believer in Smith's revelations, mortgaged his farm for the required $3,000 security payment, effectively ending his marriage.

The 23-year-old Grandin announced in the Wayne Sentinel on June 26, 1829, that he intended to publish the Book of Mormon, once the translation was complete. Oliver Cowdery prepared a copy of the book's manuscript, and Grandin bought 500 pounds of small pica type for use in the publication. The chief compositor, John H. Gilbert, found that the manuscript was "closely written and legible, but not a punctuation mark from beginning to end." Gilbert said that he added punctuation and capitalization in the evenings. To print the book, Grandin used a Smith Improved Printing Press, which had first appeared on the market about 1821 and was the most up-to-date press available to the small printer of the day. The original press used by Grandin to print the Book of Mormon, is currently located in the Church History Museum in Salt Lake City, Utah.

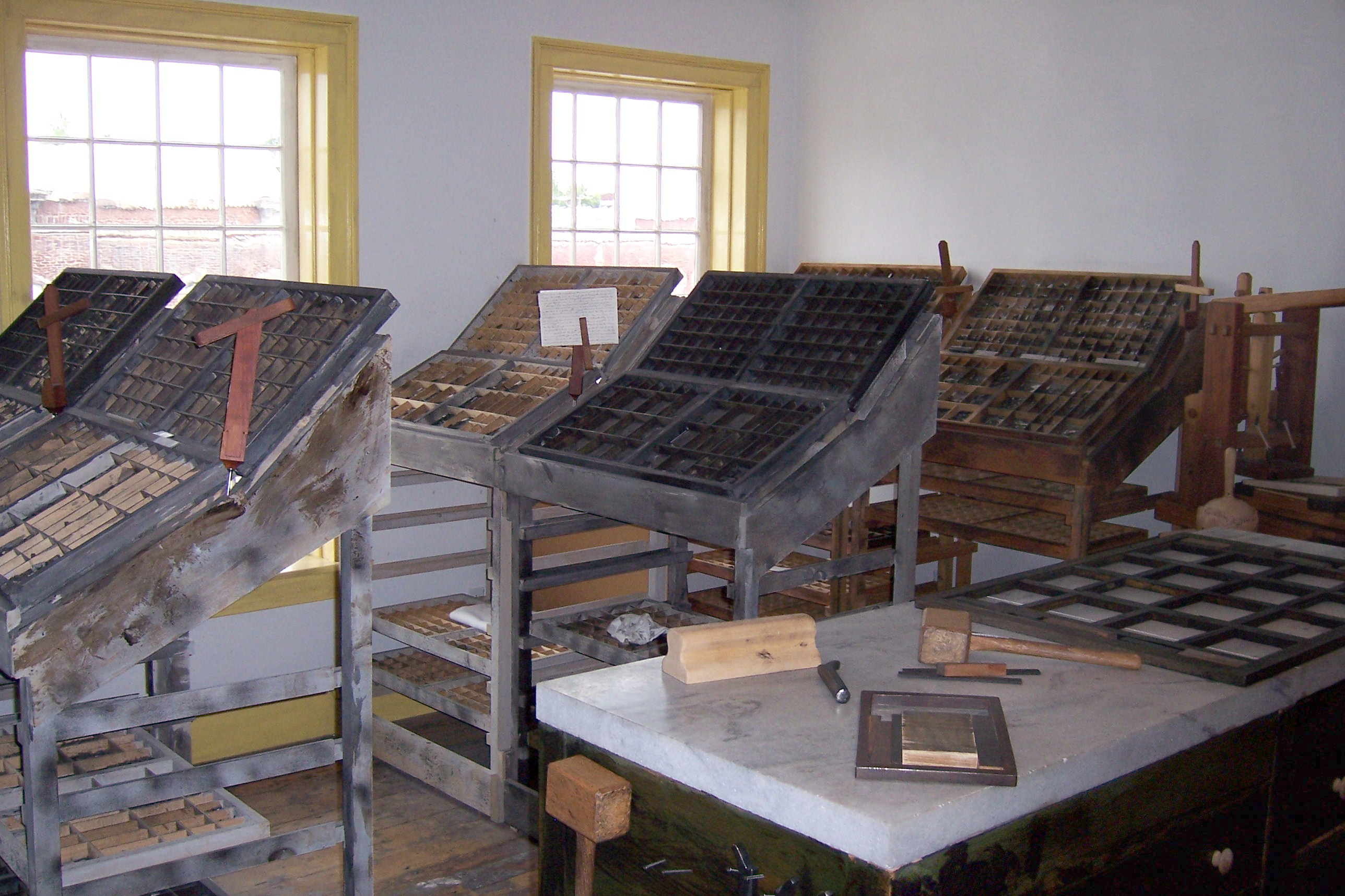
Cases containing the moveable type used in the printing process

In October, Smith wrote that local citizens were "very much excited" by the prospect of publication, but their excitement was not the sort that he had hoped for. The Palmyra Freeman called the prospective book "the greatest piece of superstition that has come to our knowledge." Abner Cole began a weekly newspaper in September, the Palmyra Reflector, and because he used Grandin's press, Cole had access to the unbound sheets and reprinted mocking excerpts until Smith threatened legal action. Many of the local citizens saw the Book of Mormon as blasphemous and not in line with orthodox Christianity. Because of this, many of them had tried to persuade Grandin to stop the book's publication. Unsuccessful, they agreed to boycott the book by not purchasing the printed copies.

The Wayne Sentinel announced on March 26, 1830, that the Book of Mormon was now on sale at Grandin's bookstore. It had taken eight men and boys working 12 hours a day, six days a week, for almost eight months to print the 5,000 copies. After the book went on sale, the boycott began. It was successful and few books were sold, Martin Harris, who had mortgaged his farm to pay for the publication, desperately tried to sell the books himself but lamented that "no Body [sic] wants them."

Today copies of Grandin's first publication of the Book of Mormon are a popular collector's item. A copy of the first edition of the Book of Mormon sold in 1999 for $58,000, another copy was sold for $44,000 in 2000, a copy was sold at auction for $180,000 in 2007, and in 2014 an original edition was appraised on the popular PBS series Antiques Roadshow for $100,000.

== Additional reading ==
- Bushman, Richard Lyman (2005). Joseph Smith: Rough Stone Rolling. New York: Alfred A. Knopf. ISBN 1-4000-7753-2.
- Givens, Terryl L. (2002). By the Hand of Mormon: The American Scripture that Launched a New World Religion. New York: Oxford University Press. ISBN 0-19-513818-X.
- Vogel, Dan (2004). Joseph Smith: The Making of a Prophet. Salt Lake City: Signature Books. ISBN 1-56085-179-1.
