= Mormon Youth Symphony and Chorus =

The Mormon Youth Symphony and Chorus (MYSC) was an official musical organization of the Church of Jesus Christ of Latter-day Saints (LDS Church) from 1969 to 1999, composed of young musicians aged 18 to 33. In its 30-year history, MYSC was credited with many television specials, numerous recordings, concerts, and several major tours throughout the United States. The group was disbanded during the 1999 reorganization of the Tabernacle Choir and resulting creation of the Orchestra at Temple Square. The choral arm of the group provided music for the church's annual and semi-annual general conferences, usually during the Saturday morning sessions.

== History ==
The MYSC was organized in 1969, with Jay E. Welch as music director and was given a primary commission from the LDS Church to promote a "greater understanding between all peoples and cultures." Welch continued in this position until his appointment as music director of the Tabernacle Choir in 1974.

At the peak of its activity, the MYSC performed approximately thirty times each year, including formal concerts in the Salt Lake Tabernacle, conference appearances, firesides, tours, broadcasts, and recordings. The concert programming was changed to a Boston Pops-style format when Robert C. Bowden became music director in 1974. Bowden composed and arranged much of the music for the groups, which frequently toured throughout the United States. In 1987, the MYSC played at the Kennedy Center in Washington, D.C. as part of the bicentennial celebration of the U.S. Constitution. Many prominent guest classical and pop artists performed in MYSC concerts throughout its history.

The MYSC won fourteen national awards for television specials, including two Emmys, two George Washington Awards from the Freedom Foundation, and the Angel Award from Religion in Media. It also performed for several national and international groups; such presentations included a television special for the Norwegian Broadcasting Company as well as specials for American Veterans of World War II, Korea, and Vietnam, and for the National League of American Pen Women. The MYSC had eighteen commercial recordings to its credit at the time it disbanded in 1999.

In the mid-1990s, the name was officially changed to the Mormon Youth Chorus and Symphony, to reflect the age restrictions enforced on the choir but not on the symphony. Thereafter, when performing alone, the symphony was known simply as the Mormon Symphony.

In June 2010, the alumni of the former organization performed in two reunion concerts in the Salt Lake Tabernacle, as part of the 30th anniversary of the Temple Square Concert series.

== Music Directors ==
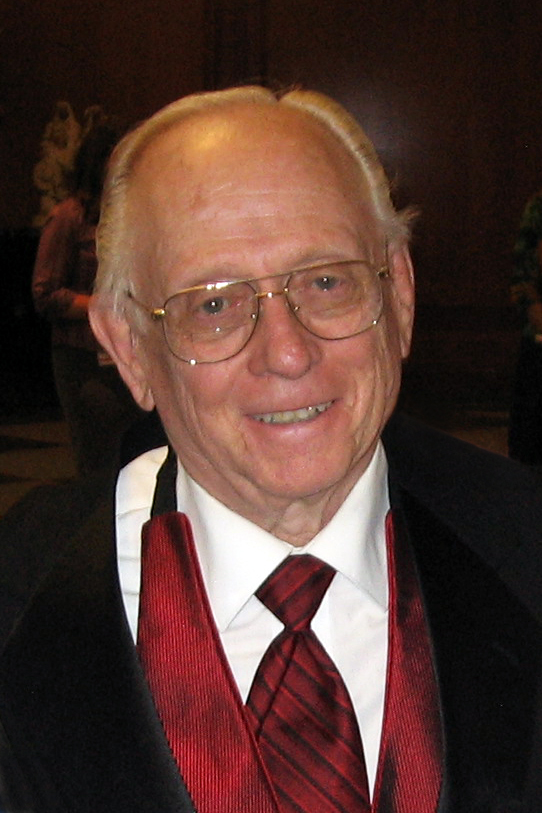
Robert C. Bowden, 2010

- Jay Welch (1969–1974)
- Robert C. Bowden (1974–1999)

== Albums ==
The MYSC produced several albums. Among them are:

- Several Christmas albums, including "A Christmas World" which was also produced as a made-for-TV special.
- "Joseph," an oratorio on the life of the Prophet Joseph Smith
- "Beloved Songs of Faith," an album which included Michael Ballam as vocal soloist.
- "Carnival of the Animals," an album for the Primary Children of the Church
- "Nauvoo Brass Bands," published for the Sesquicentennial of the Pioneers.
- "God Bless the U.S.A." an album of patriotic songs.
- "The Mormon Youth Symphony and Chorus Sing Songs for Young People" Robert C. Bowden, 1977
- "White Christmas"
