= Living Legends (BYU) =

Song and dance performing group at Brigham Young University

Living Legends, originally the Lamanite Generation, is a song and dance performing group at Brigham Young University made up of performers of Native American, Polynesian and Hispanic or Latino origin. They perform dances that originate in these cultures as well. Living Legends was formed in 1971 by Janie Thompson.

== History ==
Living Legends originally started as the Lamanite Generation which was an all-Native American performing group organized by Janie Thompson. The organization was first formed in 1971 and their first tour was across Indian reservations. They toured the Eastern United States in 1974 and they toured in Central and South American the following year. Thompson stated that the 1975 tour was, "the most significant tour in [her] entire career", because it impacted and influenced Native Americans south of the United States. Living Legends has performed around the world including China and the 1992 International Expo in Seville, Spain.

In the 1970s, the group was noted for its closing song at most performances "Go My Son", written by Arliene Nofchissey and Carnes Burson. The song encourages Native Americans to receive an education. This idea comes from the Navajo chief Manuelito who urged Native Americans to obtain an education. Native communities did not always see this message from the Lamanite Generation positively.

The transition to its current name was a long drawn out process. For example, in 1991 they still were using the name "Lamanite Generation" but performed a program entitled "Living Legends". Professor and historian Jared Farmer considers that BYU may have changed the name of the group to "Living Legends" to avoid racism associated with the word "Lamanite".

== Tour history ==
This tour history begins in 1971 and ends in 2019.

- 1971–72 Florida, Southern California, Idaho, Wyoming, Washington, Alberta, British Columbia, Saskatchewan
- 1972–73 Southern California, Arizona, Idaho, Kansas, Montana, Nebraska, North Dakota, Oklahoma, South Dakota, Texas, Wyoming, Alberta, Saskatchewan
- 1973–74 Arkansas, Colorado, Delaware, Florida, Illinois, Kansas, Mississippi, Nevada, New Hampshire, New Jersey, New York, North Carolina, Ohio, Oklahoma, South Carolina, Tennessee, Virginia, Wisconsin, Germany
- 1974–75 Alberta, Saskatchewan, Oklahoma, British Columbia, Bolivia, Brazil, Colombia, Costa Rica, Ecuador, Guatemala, Mexico, Panama, Peru, Uruguay, Venezuela
- 1975–76 Ohio, Nevada, Arizona, California, Colorado, Florida, Georgia, Idaho, Indiana, Michigan, New Mexico, New York, Pennsylvania, Tennessee, Texas, Vermont, Virginia, Washington D.C., Ontario, Quebec
- 1976–77 Arizona, Southern California, Nevada, Idaho, Washington, Minnesota, South Dakota, North Dakota, Montana, Canada
- 1977–78 Colorado, Arizona, Denmark, Sweden, Norway, Finland
- 1978–79 Nevada, Wyoming, Montana, Alberta, Colorado, New Mexico, Texas, Louisiana, Florida, South Carolina, North Carolina, Georgia, Tennessee, Arkansas, Oklahoma
- 1979–80 Southern California, Nevada, Romania, Hungary, Poland
- 1980–81 Arizona, Idaho, Oregon, Washington, Idaho, Illinois, Indiana, Iowa, Michigan, Nebraska, New York, North Dakota, Ohio, Washington, Alberta, British Columbia, Manitoba, Ontario, Quebec, Saskatchewan
- 1981–82 Arizona, Northern California, Nevada, People's Republic of China, Hong Kong, Philippines, Taiwan, Hawaii
- 1982–83 New Mexico, Arizona, North Dakota, South Dakota, England, Belgium, Germany, Switzerland, Denmark
- 1984–85 Wyoming, Montana, Alabama, Arkansas, Florida, Georgia, Louisiana, Mississippi, New Mexico, Oklahoma, Tennessee, Texas, Mexico
- 1985–86 Arizona, Australia, New Zealand, Fiji, Hawaii
- 1986–87 California, Oregon, Dominican Republic, Ecuador, Jamaica, Puerto Rico, Florida
- 1987–88 New Mexico, German Democratic Republic, Federal Republic of Germany
- 1988–89 Southern California, Nevada, Croatia, Czech Republic, Slovakia, Slovenia, Hungary, Germany
- 1989–90 Northern California, Nevada, Alberta, British Columbia, Manitoba, Saskatchewan, Idaho, Minnesota, Washington
- 1990–91 Arizona, Croatia, Czech Republic, Slovakia, Austria, Germany
- 1991–92 Idaho, Oregon, Washington, People's Republic of China, Thailand, Hong Kong, Taiwan
- 1992–93 Idaho, Montana, Wyoming, Guatemala, Honduras, Mexico, Texas
- 1993–94 New Mexico, Texas, Illinois, Minnesota, Nebraska, North Dakota, South Dakota, Wisconsin, Wyoming
- 1994–95 California, Bulgaria, Czech Republic, Romania, Slovakia, Austria
- 1995–96 Nevada, California, Austria, Germany, Italy, Croatia, Slovenia
- 1996–97 Colorado, New Mexico, Wyoming, Tahiti, Western Samoa, Cook Islands, New Zealand, Hawaii
- 1997–98 Arizona, Missouri, Illinois, Michigan, Ohio, Pennsylvania, New York, Vermont, Maine, Massachusetts, Connecticut, New Jersey, Ontario, Quebec
- 1998–99 Nevada, California, Denmark, Norway, Sweden
- 1999–2000 Washington, Idaho, Oregon, Argentina, Brazil, Paraguay, Uruguay
- 2000–01 Nevada, California, South Dakota, North Dakota, Alberta, British Columbia, Manitoba, Ontario, Saskatchewan
- 2001–02 Alaska
- 2002–03 New Mexico
- 2003–04 Alaska, Idaho, Washington, Oregon, South Africa
- 2004–05 Arizona, Nevada, California, Mexico
- 2005–06 Wyoming, Montana, Germany, Austria
- 2006–07 Alaska, Nevada, California, South Dakota, Iowa, North Dakota, Canada
- 2007–08 Colorado, Wyoming, Chile
- 2008–09 Arizona, Argentina, Paraguay, Uruguay
- 2009–10 China, Utah
- 2010–11 Russia, Washington, Idaho, Oregon, Alaska
- 2011–12 Utah, New Mexico, Arizona, California, Nauvoo, Illinois
- 2012–13 Guatemala, Honduras, Nicaragua
- 2013–14 California, Nevada, Nauvoo, Illinois
- 2014–15 New Mexico, Texas, Montana, Canada, Alaska
- 2015–16 New Zealand, Tonga, Samoa
- 2016–17 Idaho, Washington, Oregon
- 2017–18 Kansas, Missouri, Illinois, Wisconsin, Minnesota, North Dakota, Iowa, South Dakota, Nebraska
- 2018–19 Mexico, Colorado, Utah, Germany, Switzerland, Brazil

== Recording ==
- Go My Son (album)
