= Origin of the Book of Mormon =

Theories about the provenance of the Book of Mormon

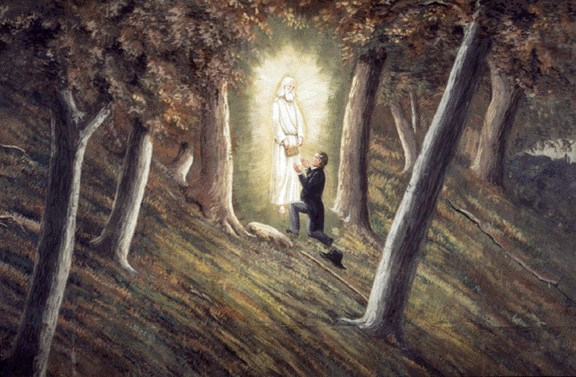
Artist's impression of Joseph Smith receiving the golden plates from the angel Moroni

Adherents to the Latter Day Saint movement view the Book of Mormon as a work of divinely inspired scripture, which was written by prophets in the ancient Americas. Most adherents believe Joseph Smith's account of translating ancient golden plates inscribed by prophets. Smith preached that the angel Moroni, a prophet in the Book of Mormon, directed him in the 1820s to a hill near his home in Palmyra, New York, where the plates were buried. Critics point out there is no physical evidence that Joseph Smith actually had possession of golden plates. Several individuals besides Smith himself have stated they saw the plates, including 11 witnesses whose testimonies are found at the beginning of every copy of the book, beginning with the First Edition, who said they saw them in 1829. Three of those individuals also stated they were visited by an angel. The other eight witnesses said that they viewed the plates without any divine manifestations. They relate that they were permitted by Smith to handle and heft the plates and examine the engraved characters found on the plates. Other witnesses at other times had occasion to heft or carry the plates while they were wrapped in cloth. Still others did not say they had seen the plates but that they had observed Smith dictating parts of the text that eventually became the Book of Mormon.

There is an extensive body of work by scholars supportive of Smith's claims who have studied the manuscripts, and the text in its various aspects. Critics who have examined the question of authorship of the text have wondered whether it was written by Smith alone or with help from an associate (such as Oliver Cowdery or Sidney Rigdon). Other critics suggest The Book of Mormon was copied by Smith from other available literature at the time of its production, such as the View of the Hebrews, the Spalding Manuscript (often seen spelled as "Spaulding"), or the King James Version of the Bible.

== Theories of authorship ==
There are differing views on the origin of the Book of Mormon.

1. Sole author, Joseph Smith, drawing upon contemporary ideas and themes.
2. Sole author, other: Largely dismissed by modern scholarship, but highly influential among Smith's contemporaries and early critics. It primarily focused on Solomon Spalding.
3. Theories of multiple authors posit collaboration with others to produce the Book of Mormon, generally citing Book of Mormon scribe Oliver Cowdery or Sidney Rigdon as potential co-authors.
4. Latter Day Saint view: ancient historical narrative, translated by miraculous means.

The prevailing view among scholars is that Joseph Smith authored the Book of Mormon himself, without the intentional complicity of anyone else. One argument for this theory is that the Book of Mormon reflects Smith's life experiences. There are, for instance, parallels between the tree of life vision in the Book of Mormon and a dream of Joseph Smith Sr.

The golden plates were sometimes called the "Golden Bible" in early descriptions. The label "Golden Bible" predates the Book of Mormon, as legends of such an artifact circulated in Canada and upstate New York while Smith was growing up in Vermont. Smith's companion Peter Ingersoll later stated that Smith had told him of the legend of the Canadian Golden Bible.

=== Theories of multiple authors/translators ===
Another theory is that Smith was aided in the translation of the Book of Mormon by one or more co-authors, such as Sidney Rigdon or Oliver Cowdery. Both Rigdon and Cowdery had more formal education than Smith.

David Persuitte highlights a revelation of Smith's from March 1829, that apparently limited Smith's power to translation. Persuitte argues the wording of the revelations indicates at least one other secret collaborator, as "if he had some partners who had imposed it upon him in order to prevent him from gathering too much power to himself." In contrast, co-authors Jerald and Sandra Tanner argue the early text of the revelation merely demonstrates that "Joseph Smith was not planning on doing any other work besides the Book of Mormon".

==== Oliver Cowdery ====
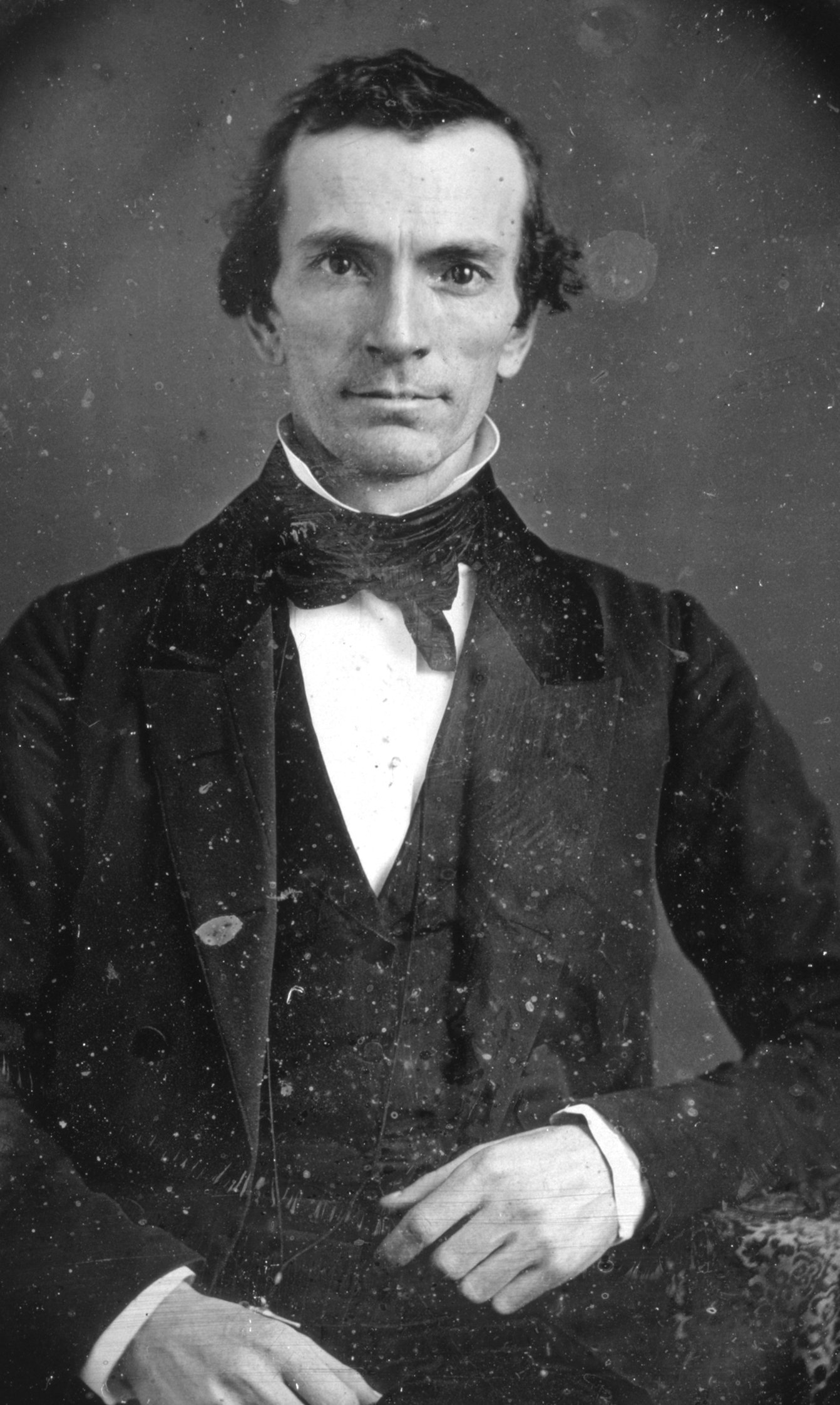
Oliver Cowdery

Oliver Cowdery was a third-cousin of Lucy Mack Smith, Joseph Smith's mother. A pastor who lived near Cowdery, Ethan Smith, had written View of the Hebrews, another work that has been posited as a source for the Book of Mormon. Cowdery served as scribe during the transcription of the Book of Mormon, and was one of the Three Witnesses to the golden plates. Cowdery later resigned and was excommunicated in 1838, then re-joined the LDS Church in 1848.

==== Sidney Rigdon ====
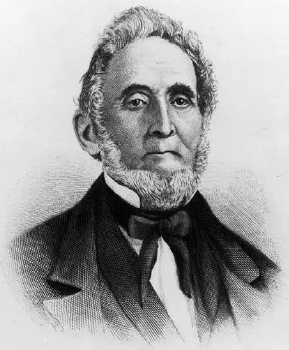
Sidney Rigdon

Sidney Rigdon was a Baptist preacher, and one of the most prominent of Smith's earliest followers. Rigdon served as a scribe for the Book of Moses, received revelations jointly with Smith, served as Smith's spokesperson, and with Smith carried the title "Prophet, Seer, and Revelator". After Smith's death, Rigdon led his own faction of Latter Day Saints and continued to announce revelations.

Pointing away from Rigdon's co-authorship, there is little or no extant evidence that Smith knew of or was in contact with Rigdon until after the Book of Mormon was published, although some witness accounts place Rigdon in upstate New York in 1825 and 1826. Most histories state that Rigdon learned of the Book of Mormon from Parley P. Pratt, a member of Rigdon's Kirtland congregation, who had joined the Church of Christ in Palmyra in September 1830. Upon Pratt's return to Ohio, Rigdon reportedly learned of Smith and the Book of Mormon and was baptized by Pratt. According to these histories, only after his own baptism did Rigdon travel to New York, first meeting Smith in December 1830, nine months after the Book of Mormon's publication.

== Beliefs of Latter-day Saints ==
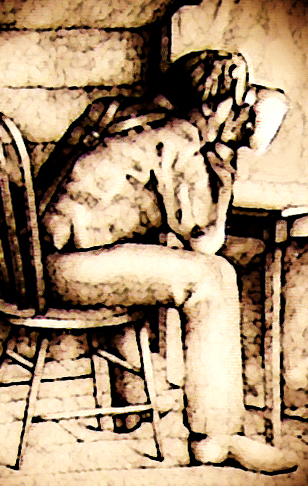
A depiction of Joseph Smith dictating the Book of Mormon by peering into a hat

Religious adherents to the Latter-day Saints Movement generally accept Joseph Smith's account that he translated an ancient record compiled and abridged by Mormon, a pre-Columbian resident of the Western Hemisphere. Some believers, perhaps in reaction to critique of these beliefs, suppose that the text is a divinely inspired narrative, regardless of its historicity (i.e., "Inspired Fiction"), or an example of "automatic writing".

According to the accounts of Joseph Smith and his associates, the original record was engraved on thin, malleable sheets of metal ("leaves") with the appearance of gold, and bound with three rings at one edge. The engraving was reportedly of considerable skill. According to the narrative of the book, the prophet-historian Mormon abridged other records of the local civilizations from the preceding millennia. Mormon then gave the record to his son, Moroni, who inscribed a few additional words of his own, and concealed the plates about AD 400. Near the end of Moroni's life (approximately AD 421), he placed these plates along with several other items in a stone box in a hillside (now named Cumorah) near present-day Palmyra, New York.

By Smith's account, on September 21, 1823, this same Moroni, now an angel, appeared to Smith to instruct him about this ancient record and its destined translation into English. Smith was shown the location of the plates (and the other items in the box), but was not immediately allowed to take them. After four years of annually meeting with the angel, Smith was finally entrusted with the plates. Through the power of God and the Urim and Thummim (ancient seeing stones buried with the plates), he was able to translate the Reformed Egyptian inscriptions. Smith stated he was commanded to show the plates to only certain people. Accounts by these individuals are recorded in the introduction of the Book of Mormon as "The Testimony of the Three Witnesses" and "The Testimony of the Eight Witnesses."

== Purported sources ==
A number of works have been cited that could have served as sources for the Book of Mormon.

=== King James Version of the Bible ===
The King James Bible (1611) may have been a source for the Book of Mormon. In total, some 478 verses in the Book of Mormon are quoted in some form from the KJV Book of Isaiah. Segments of the Book of Mormon—1 Nephi chapters 20–21 and 2 Nephi chapters 7–8 and 12–24—match nearly word-for-word Isaiah 48:1–52:2 and 2–14 (respectively). Other parallels include Mosiah 14 with KJV Isaiah 53, 3 Nephi 22 with KJV Isaiah 54, 3 Nephi 24–25 with KJV Malachi 3–4, and 3 Nephi 12–14 with KJV Matthew 5–7.

King James Bible	Book of Mormon (1830)
"For, behold, the day cometh, that shall burn as an oven; and all the proud, yea, and all that do wickedly, shall be stubble: and the day that cometh shall burn them up" (Malachi 4:1)	"For behold, saith the prophet... the day soon cometh that all the proud and they who do wickedly shall be as stubble; and the day cometh that they must be burned." (1 Nephi 22:15)
"[T]he axe is laid unto the root of the trees; therefore every tree which bringeth not forth good fruit is hewn down, and cast into the fire" (Matthew 3:10)	"[T]he ax is laid at the root of the tree; therefore every tree that bringeth not forth good fruit shall be hewn down and cast into the fire" (Alma 5:52)
"[B]e steadfast and unmoveable, always abounding in the work of the Lord" (1 Corinthians 15:58)	"[B]e steadfast and immovable, always abounding in good works" (Mosiah 5:15)

Joseph Smith taught that The Book of Mormon was written at least 1100 years prior to the King James Version, but it contains many of the same peculiarities, such as Mark 16:15–18, which is quoted nearly word-for-word in Mormon 9:22–24. This passage addresses believers holding snakes and drinking poison; however, it does not appear in many early biblical manuscripts and is widely believed to have been composed in the 2nd century. Additionally, the Book of Mormon reflects KJV literary and linguistic style. The KJV was the most commonly used translation of the Bible when the Book of Mormon was produced.

=== Deuterocanon/Apocrypha ===
Another theorized source for the Book of Mormon are the books of the Deuterocanon, called "Apocrypha" by Protestants. In particular, 2 Maccabees includes the name "Nephi".

Apocrypha	Book of Mormon (1830)
"We will assay to abridge in one volume. ... labouring to follow the rules of an abridgment. ... But to use brevity ... is to be granted to him that will make an abridgement." (2 Maccabees 2:25-31)	"I make an abridgement of the record ... after I have abridged the record. ... I had made an abridgement from the plates of Nephi. ... I write a small abridgement." (1 Nephi 1:17, Words of Mormon 3, 5:9)
"They commanded that this writing should be put in tables of brass, and that they should be set ... in a conspicuous place; Also that the copies thereof should be laid up in the treasury" (1 Maccabees 14:48-49)	"And I commanded him ... that he should go with me into the treasury ... I also spake unto him that I should carry the engravings, which were upon the plates of brass" (1 Nephi 4:20,24)
"Then the king, in closing the place, made it holy ... many men call it Nephi". (2 Maccabees 1:34,36)	"And my people would that we should call the name of the place Nephi; wherefore we did call it Nephi". (2 Nephi 5:8)
"And it came to pass ... I dreamed a dream by night" (2 Esdras 13:1)	"And it came to pass ... Behold, I have dreamed a dream" (1 Nephi 8:2)

=== Spalding's "Manuscript Found" ===
In 1834, E. D. Howe in his book Mormonism Unvailed introduced a theory that Smith plagiarized from the manuscript for an unpublished novel by Solomon Spalding. Howe possessed the manuscript at the time of the Book of Mormon publication. Spalding's story, called "Manuscript Story", revolves around a group of seafaring Romans who sail to the New World some two millennia ago. Critics long speculated that Smith had access to the original script and that Smith heavily plagiarized it for the Book of Mormon. The only known manuscript was discovered in 1884 and now resides at Oberlin College in Ohio. Once the manuscript was available for study, most critics discarded this theory because the "extensive parallels" were only of a few minor details: intercontinental seafaring, the existence (and use) of a seer stone, and the discovery of records under a stone (Latin parchments vs. golden plates with "reformed Egyptian" inscriptions). Most other purported similarities, attested by various witness affidavits gathered by Doctor Philastus Hurlbut, were nonexistent. Historian Fawn Brodie expressed suspicion regarding these affidavits, stating that the style of the statements was too similar and displayed too much uniformity.

=== View of the Hebrews ===
Another purported source of the Book of Mormon is View of the Hebrews, first published in 1823 by Ethan Smith (no relation), a pastor in Poultney, Vermont. Critics argue that the works share several passages and many thematic elements. Book of Mormon witness and scribe Oliver Cowdery, and his family, had attended Ethan Smith's church since November 1821. Prior to his book's publication, Ethan Smith advocated his views regarding the origins of Native Americans in sermons to his congregations. In 1825, Ethan Smith published an expanded second edition of View of the Hebrews, the same year that Cowdery left Poultney for New York state.

View of the Hebrews by Ethan Smith (1825 edition)	Book of Mormon (1830)
"[T]hose far distant savages have (as have all other tribes) their Great Spirit, who made everything" (p. 103)	"Believest thou that this Great Spirit who is God, created all things ... And he said: Yea, I believe that he created all things" (Alma 18:28–29)
"[T]he places ... are noted; among which are 'the isles of the sea'". (p. 232-233)	"[W]e have been led to a better land, ... [W]e are upon an isle of the sea" (2 Nephi 10:20)
" 'I will hiss for them' God is represented as hissing for a people. ... [To] behold the banner of salvation now erected for his ancient people. ... This standard of salvation." (p. 235,241–242)	"[M]y words shall hiss forth unto the ends of the earth, for a standard unto my people, which are of the house of Israel." (2 Nephi 29:2)

Mormon apologist B. H. Roberts authored a manuscript titled Studies of the Book of Mormon, comparing the content of the Book of Mormon with View of the Hebrews. Roberts concluded, assuming a hemispheric geography theory for the Book of Mormon, sufficient parallels existed that future critics could state that View of the Hebrews had provided a structural foundation for the Book of Mormon story. Roberts's manuscript was private and shared only with LDS Church leadership. Roberts continued to publicly support the miraculous origin theory of the Book of Mormon.

Roberts's list of parallels included:

- Extensive quotation from Isaiah
- The future gathering of Israel, and restoration of the Ten Lost Tribes
- Development of the New World from the Old via a long journey over "seas" of "many waters"
- A religious motive for the migration
- Division of the migrants into civilized and uncivilized groups with long wars between them, and the eventual destruction of the civilized by the uncivilized
- The assumption that all American natives were descended from Israelites and their languages from Hebrew
- Burial of a "lost book" with "yellow leaves"
- Description of extensive military fortifications with military observatories or "watch towers" overlooking them
- A change from monarchy to republican forms of government
- The preaching of the gospel in ancient America

David Persuitte has also presented a large number of parallels between the View of the Hebrews and the Book of Mormon, but notes there are no instances of direct copying. The parallels that Persuitte presents cover a broad range of topics, including religious ideas about the responsibility of the American people in convincing the Indians of their "Israelite" origins and converting them to Christianity. Persuitte quotes from View of the Hebrews Ethan Smith's theory about what happened to the ancient Israelites after they arrived in America. He argues that it essentially summarizes the basic narrative of the Book of Mormon, including the split into two factions (civilized and savage). Persuitte also quotes several similar descriptions of structures built by the civilized faction, the wars between the two factions, and other similarities. According to Persuitte, these are sufficient to have "inspired" Joseph Smith to have written the Book of Mormon. Joseph Smith himself mentioned Ethan Smith and cited passages from View of the Hebrews in an article from the June 1842 publication of Times and Seasons.

=== The Wonders of Nature ===
Critics have said several passages and thematic material in the Book of Mormon are found in Josiah Priest's The Wonders of Nature, published in 1825.

The Wonders of Nature by Josiah Priest (1825)	Book of Mormon (1830)
"a narrow neck of land is interposed betwixt two vast oceans" (p. 598)	"the narrow neck of land, by the place where the sea divides the land" (Ether 10:20)
"From whence no traveller returns" (p. 469)	"from whence no traveler can return" (2 Nephi 1:14)

=== The Golden Pot ===
A possible inspiration for the story of the golden plates may be The Golden Pot: A Modern Fairytale, a novella by German author E. T. A. Hoffmann, first published in 1814 and first available in English in the 1827 Thomas Carlyle translation. Much of the narrative occurs in the imagination of the protagonist Anselmus. Alleged similarities include:

- Anselmus encounters Archivarius Lindhorst, the last archivist of Atlantis
- Archivarius Lindhorst is a guardian of ancient treasures (like Moroni)
- Significant events occur on the fall equinox
- Anselmus receives a gold record with writing and is asked to decipher it

=== The Late War ===
The Late War is an account of the War of 1812 which is written by Gilbert J. Hunt in the style of the King James Bible, and was published in New York in 1816. The 2008 work Mormon Parallels and a 2010 work have discussed possible similarities. In 2013, The Late War was the subject of discussion among both ex-Mormons and Mormon apologists.

=== Works of John Bunyan ===
William Davis has discussed similarities between the Book of Mormon and the works of English writer and preacher John Bunyan, such as his widely read fictional work The Pilgrim's Progress (1678). Newspaper editor Eber D. Howe also stated some similarities in his Mormonism Unvailed.

=== 17th–19th century beliefs about Native American origins ===
Belief that Native Americans were of Jewish origin was common before the publication of The Book of Mormon. Pseudo-scholarly proofs involving the Mound Builder Myth and Lost Tribes Myth remained popular until scientific advances in archaeology and DNA disproved these theories.

- Thomas Thorowgood (1650): In "Jews in America or Probabilities that the Americans are of that Race" published for the New England missionary society, Thorowgood proposes that American Indians are of Israelite origin.
- William Penn (1683): In his "Letter to the Free Society of Traders", Penn expressed his belief that Native Americans might be descendants of the ten lost tribes of Israel.
- James Adair (1775): In his book "The history of the American Indians", Adair provides 23 arguments over 180 pages for Jewish origin of American Indians in the section "Observations, and arguments, in proof of the American Indians being descended from the Jews".
- Jonathan Edwards (1789): Publishes a study to show supposed linguistic ties between the Mohican language (called Muhhekaneew in the study) and Hebrew.
- Charles Crawford (1801): Published his essay attempting to prove that American Indians descended from the Israelites.
- Elias Boudinot (1816): Publishes "A Star in the West; or, humble attempt to discover the long lost ten tribes of Israel, preparatory to their return to their beloved city, Jerusalem" attempting to prove that the American Indians are the descendants of Israel.
- Sarah J. Hale (1823): Imagined in her poems that the mounds built by the mound builders could have been built by the inhabitants of the ancient Semitic people of Tyre, Lebanon. "Various are the opinions respecting the origin of those ancient inhabitants who have left such indubitable traces of their Industry and civilization in America. That these mounds and fortifications were not the works of the ancestors of our present race of Indians, is universally conceded; but by what people, or at what time, they were erected, are secrets, the philosopher and antiquary have vainly attempted to discover. [...] They could not be savages according to our idea of the term. May we not rather imagine them to be exiles from some powerful eastern nation, or city, that flourished at an early period of the world. In the selection of Tyrians [Lebanon] for my adventurers, I was guided, merely by the circumstance of their superiority in maritime knowledge, connected with their power, wealth, and enterprising industry."
- Ethan Smith (1823): Publishes "View of the Hebrews" proposing that American Indians descended from ancient Jews and that the Mound Builders were these ancient ancestors who arrived in the Americas by a sea journey via the Bering Strait. The main themes in the View of the Hebrews such as a sea journey, the ancient Jews dividing into civilized and barbaric peoples with the barbaric people exterminating the civilized people, wars, and description of government, parallel those in the Book of Mormon which was published in 1830.
- Josiah Priest (1826): In his book The Wonders of Nature, Priest dedicates a chapter to "Proofs that the Indians of North America are descended from the ancient Hebrews". He states, "These are queries of great moment, at this period, when the time of their [the American Indians who are of Jewish origin] restoration is drawing near. [...] When the restoration of the Hebrews is predicted, in Isaiah xi. That God will in the last days set up an ensign for the nations; it is to 'assemble the outcasts of Israel; and gather together the dispersed of Judah from the four corners of the earth.'"
- Israel Worsley (1828): Publishes "A view of the American Indians, their general character, customs, language, public festivals, religious rites, and traditions: Shewing them to be the Descendants of The Ten Tribes of Israel."

=== Legends of Captain Kidd ===
By 1989, some authors speculated that Smith's story of the angel Moroni—who buried a treasure on the hill Cumorah—might be linked to legends of Captain Kidd burying a treasure near the port Moroni —on one of the Comoros islands in the Indian Ocean. However it is uncertain if any map or text in Smith's time and place linked the island to buried treasure or made any mention of the port's existence.

== See also ==
- Criticism of Mormonism
- Mosiah priority
- Life of Joseph Smith from 1827 to 1830
- Pre-Columbian transoceanic contact theories
