= Jewish Indian theory =

Theory that Native Americans are one of the lost tribes of Israel

The Jewish Indian theory (also called the Hebraic Indian theory or the Jewish Amerindian theory) is the erroneous idea that some or all of the lost tribes of Israel had travelled to the Americas and that all or some of the Indigenous peoples of the Americas are of Israelite descent or were influenced by still-lost Jewish populations. The theory was popular in the late seventeenth century following works by Menasseh Ben Israel, John Dury, and Thomas Thorowgood.

Via the works of James Adair, Ethan Smith, and two Methodist Elders by the names of George Lane and Johnson Dunham, it had a lasting legacy through its influence on Mormon belief.

== History ==
The belief that the Indigenous peoples of the Americas are of Israelite descent dates back to the fifteenth century. The discovery of the populated New World seemed to challenge Europeans' theories of human origins, with the question of how the origins of Indigenous peoples in the Americas fitted into scriptural history. Various ideas arose, including possible relationships to Egyptians, Phoenicians, Carthaginians, Vikings, Tatars, the Chinese people or Atlantis. However, the most popular idea to emerge was that the Indigenous peoples of the Americas were the descendants of the lost tribes of Israel. This theory thus neatly answered both the question of the Indigenous peoples' origins and what had happened to the lost tribes. The theory existed in a wider debate about whether peoples of the world had a monogenic origin in Adam or whether they had a polygenic origin, deriving from different creations.

=== Spanish writings ===
The theory was discussed by Spanish writers in the sixteenth century, including Diego de Landa in his Relación de las cosas de Yucatán (The Relation of the Things of the Yucatan), written around 1566, and Diego Durán's History of the Indies of New Spain (1581). The first work to address the theory systematically came in 1607: The Origin of the Indians of the New World by Dominican Gregorio García. García argued based on supposed similarities in appearance, custom (including idolatry) and language (including the frequency of glottals) that the lost tribes of Israel travelled to the Americas alongside other migrations, including of Carthaginians and Phoenicians and people from China, Tartary and Atlantis. The book also makes etymological arguments: for example, García asserted that "Mex-" in "Mexico" was based on the Hebrew term "Messiah".

García argued that circumcision was common among Indigenous peoples of the Americas, particularly in the Yucatán. García suggested that the lost tribes must have reached the Americas from eastern Asia via what is now called the Bering Strait. In contrast, the French archbishop Gilbert Génébrard argued in 1587 that they travelled via Greenland.

Diego Andres Rocha also argued for the idea in Tratado Unico y Singular del Origen de los Indios (1687), with claims including that a broken Hebrew is spoken in Cuba and Jamaica. He argued that the Spanish first populated the Americas shortly after the Flood, with the lost tribes coming much later, via the Bering Strait.

=== In England and the Netherlands in the mid-seventeenth century ===
More generally, the theory came to prominence in England and northwestern Europe in the 1650s, during a period of messianic millenarianism. Notably, it came to prominence in England during the rule of Oliver Cromwell. This occurred at a time when no Jews were officially living in England. The English may have been predisposed to accept the theory because of early British Israelism, the theory that sought to prove the existence of a connection between the lost tribes and the English. The theory was not just of historical concern: it carried concomitant eschatological implications as the return of the lost tribes and conversion of the entire Jewish nation would herald the Second Coming of Jesus.

A key early publication in England was Edward Winslow's The Glorious Progress of the Gospel Amongst the Indians in New England (1649), which claimed some elements of Native American life followed Mosaic laws. The publication urged further action to convert Native Americans to Christianity.

Another important work was written by Thomas Thorowgood (or Thoroughgood): Iewes in America, published 1650, re-issued in 1652 as Digitus Dei: New Discoveryes. This presented a detailed defence of the theory, including a focus on supposed linguistic similarities with Hebrew and on the use of circumcision. He suggested the lost tribes had reached the Americas via the Bering Strait or thereabouts. The suffering of the Native Americans was explained as part of a divine plan for the Jews. Thorowgood believed that, as members of the Jewish community, the Native Americans would be converted to Christianity to produce the Second Coming, thus providing a theological justification for the English colonial project in North America. Thorowgood and Winslow shared millenalist beliefs.

Hamon L'Estrange published a rebuttal of the theory in 1651, titled Americans no Iewes, which Thorowgood also argued against in his 1660 work titled Jews in America (a new work despite the similarity in name to the 1650's work Iewes in America).

Antonio de Montezinos, a Portuguese convert from Judaism to Christianity, claimed to have met an Indigenous tribe which spoke Hebrew and recited the shema during his travels in New Grenada.

The Portuguese-Dutch rabbi Menasseh ben Israel wrote a pamphlet, Spes Israelis (Hope of Israel) in 1650, which was translated into English by Moses Wall and published as Spes Israelis, The Hope of Israel in the same year. His work was cited by both Winslow and Thorowgood. Ben Israel, believing Montezinos' account, asserted that there were Jews hidden in South America, as well as in other places across Asia and Africa. He argued that the supposed cultural similarities resulted from the Indigenous peoples' ancestors borrowing them from Jews who were living among them, rather than the Indigenous populations encountered being of Jewish descent. Ben Israel also argued that the lost tribes had travelled to the Americas via the Bering Strait, which must have once been dry land, and that they were responsible for the monumental buildings found in central and south America. Unlike the Christian Thorowgood, Ben Israel couched the theory in terms of Jewish messianism.

While the theory gathered support in England in the middle of the seventeenth century, it was less popular in New England, reflecting the New Englanders' greater familiarity with Native Americans, whereas the likes of Thorowgood and Ben Israel had never been to the continent. Some accepted the idea that the Native Americans were of Semitic descent, i.e. descended from Shem, but not that they are Jewish.

=== Later views ===
James Adair's 1775 History of the American Indians was a seminal later text. It again drew linguistic comparisons and on cultural comparisons, including the seclusion of women during menstruation. Notably, Adair had spent 40 years living in North America, unlike earlier authors who had not visited the continent.

In 1803, Benjamin Rush, a doctor and medical advisor to the Lewis and Clark Expedition, asked Lewis to record any similarities between Native American religious practices and those of the Jews.

Elias Boudinot's A Star in the West, or, a Humble Attempt to Discover the Long Lost Ten Tribes of Israel (1816) and Ethan Smith's View of the Hebrews (1825) drew on Adair's work. Both of them argue for a central role for the US within a Christian millennial belief system. Boudinot argued that Native American languages could be seen to have been descended from Hebrew.

The Book of Mormon (1830) revised the theory, rejecting the lost tribes as an origin, but claiming a Biblical origin for Native Americans. The Book states that Jewish people emigrated to the Americas after the destruction of the first Temple and it also states that Jesus Christ appeared in the Americas and preached to Native Americans after his resurrection.

The American diplomat and journalist Mordecai Manuel Noah argued in support of the idea in The American Indians Being the Descendants of the Lost Tribes of Israel (1837).

Following the 1830s, the theory's popularity waned in both religious and scientific discourse, and almost entirely disappeared by the 20th century, with adherents only among some millenarian Christian sects, including some sects of the Black Hebrew Israelites. Interest in the theory resurfaced at the end of the 20th century as increasingly-available DNA testing provided a new line of inquiry. DNA studies, however, ultimately have not suggested any possibility of Israelite origin for Native American peoples.

In the 1990s and early 2000s, Thomas Murphy and Simon Southerton interrogated the historicity of the Israelite origins narrative in order to push the LDS to change doctrine concerning race. Murphy argued that the absence of Middle Eastern genetic markers in indigenous American groups not only proved that the Book of Mormon is historically inaccurate, but that it is further a man-made racist document produced in the context of early 19th century white social norms. Southerton expanded on this perspective in 2004, arguing that the Book of Mormon was pure fantasy born of pre-Civil War white racial anxiety. John L. Sorenson and Matthew Roper responded to these arguments by demonstrating that indigenous American genetics were more complicated than portrayed by Southerton and Murphy, and that believing in the existence of indigenous Americans not descended from Israelites was compatible with Mormon faith. In 2007, the LDS scriptures committee adjusted its Book of Mormon explanatory text for indigenous American ancestry from "they are the principal ancestors of the Native Americans" to "they are among the ancestors of the Native Americans".

== See also ==
- Native American–Jewish relations
- Native American people and Mormonism
- Inca Jews
