= Spalding–Rigdon theory of Book of Mormon authorship =

Overview of claim the Book of Mormon was plagiarized from Solomon Spalding's writings

The Spalding–Rigdon theory of Book of Mormon authorship is the theory that the Book of Mormon was partly plagiarized from an unpublished manuscript by Solomon Spalding. The theory first appeared in print in E. D. Howe's 1834 book Mormonism Unvailed [sic]. The theory is that Spalding's manuscript was stolen by Sidney Rigdon, who used it in collusion with Joseph Smith and Oliver Cowdery to produce the Book of Mormon. Rigdon claimed that he was converted to the Latter Day Saint movement by reading The Book of Mormon, but Howe argued that this story was a later invention to hide the book's true origin.

The theory was once extremely popular among critics of The Book of Mormon, but by the 1970s there were scholarly critiques of it.

== Spalding's works ==
Around 1812, Spalding completed a historical romance, Manuscript, Found, which "purported to have been a record found buried in the earth". He moved to Pittsburgh and reportedly took Manuscript, Found to the publisher Patterson & Lambdin. Spalding died in 1816, with Manuscript, Found unpublished.

=== Oberlin manuscript ===
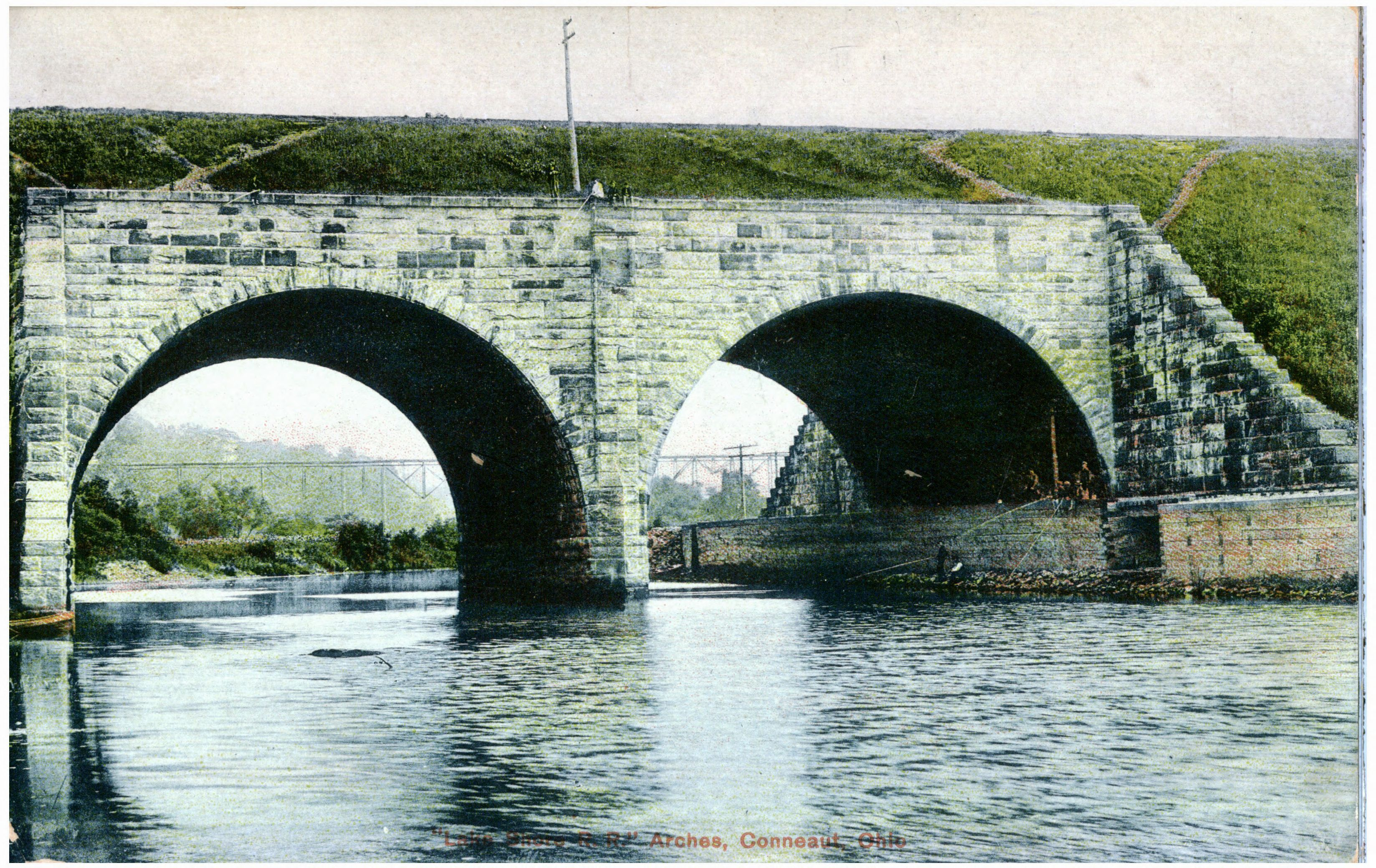
Bridge over Conneaut Creek, where, according to Spalding's fictional story, Roman scrolls were found recounting the voyage of a group of Romans to the Americas.

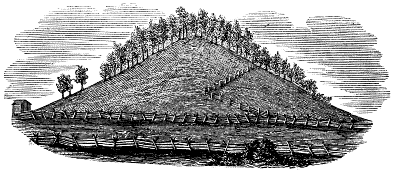
According to Joseph Smith, the angel Moroni took him to Mount Cumorah (image). There he found the golden plates relating the journey of a group of Israelites to the Americas.

An unfinished manuscript copy exists of a historical fiction by Spalding, written from 1809 to 1812, about a Roman discovery of the Americas. It is called the Oberlin Manuscript or Honolulu Manuscript. It is a historical romance "purporting to have been translated from the Latin, found on 24 rolls of parchment in a cave, on the banks of the Conneaut Creek".

In 1884, this manuscript, known as Manuscript Story – Conneaut Creek, was discovered and published, and it now resides at Oberlin College. Some authors claim it parallels The Book of Mormon in theme and narrative.

==== Plot ====
Manuscript Story – Conneaut Creek is a fictional story about a group of Romans who, while sailing to England early in the fourth century AD, were blown off course and landed in eastern North America. One of them kept a record of their experiences among eastern and midwestern American Indian tribes.

==== Full manuscript ====
An 1885 book printed by the Reorganized Church of Jesus Christ of Latter Day Saints (now The Community of Christ) said it contained the wording of the original, previously unpublished work, and was a "verbatim copy of the original now in the Library of Oberlin College, Ohio; including correspondence touching the Manuscript, its preservation and transmission until it came into the hands of the publishers."

=== Hypothetical lost manuscript ===
Though Manuscript Story – Conneaut Creek is not the same story as Manuscript Found, In 1977, nationally known graphology experts Henry Silver, William Kaye, and Howard Doulder wrote in The Los Angeles Times that they noticed similarities between Spalding's handwriting and the writing on some of the original manuscripts of The Book of Mormon. After considerable media attention, Silver and Kaye clarified that they would need to see more original manuscripts of Spalding's work to "definitely come to a conclusion".

=== Similarity to Book of Mormon ===
In 1832, Latter Day Saint missionaries Samuel H. Smith and Orson Hyde visited Conneaut, Ohio, and preached from the Book of Mormon. Nehemiah King, a Conneaut resident who knew Spalding when he lived there, felt that the Mormon text resembled the story Spalding wrote years earlier.

In 1833, Spalding's brother John and seven other Conneaut residents signed affidavits stating that Spalding had written a manuscript, parts of which were identical to The Book of Mormon. Spalding's widow told a similar story, and said, "the names of Nephi and Lehi are yet fresh in my memory, as being the principal heroes of his tale." These statements were published in E. D. Howe's 1834 book Mormonism Unvailed.

Historian Fawn Brodie expressed suspicion about these statements, claiming that their style was too similar and displayed too much uniformity. She suggested that the witnesses had a "little judicious prompting". (Despite her suspicions about these claims, Brodie viewed Joseph Smith as a fraud who "improvised" The Book of Mormon in her study No Man Knows My History: The Life of Joseph Smith.)

In an article published in June 1834, the Hudson, Ohio Observer printed interviews with some of the Conneaut witnesses.

== Sidney Rigdon ==
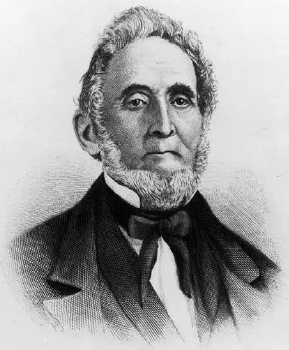
Sidney Rigdon

The theory that Sidney Rigdon was The Book of Mormon's true author first appeared in print in a February 15, 1831 article. James Gordon Bennett, who had visited the Palmyra–Manchester area and interviewed several residents, also proposed Rigdon's authorship in an August 1831 article.

=== Rigdon's denial ===
In 1839, Rigdon published a letter to the editor in which he denied having anything to do with the creation of The Book of Mormon. He acknowledged a "slight acquaintance" with publisher Robert Patterson, but denied any firsthand knowledge of a printing office. He emphatically denied any prior knowledge of Spalding or his manuscripts.

== Later statements supporting the theory ==
In January 1841, Adamson Bentley said, "I know that Sydney Rigdon told me there was a book coming out (the manuscript of which had been found engraved on gold plates) as much as two years before the Mormon book made its appearance in this country or had been heard of by me."

In 1873, Darwin Atwater said: "That [Rigdon] knew before of the coming of The Book of Mormon is to me certain, from what he said the first of his visits to my father's some years before [at about the close of January 1827] [...] He gave a wonderful description of the mounds and other antiquities found in some parts of America, and said they must have been made by the aborigines. He said there was a book to be published containing an account of those things.

In 1879, Rebecca Eichbaum gave a statement connecting Rigdon to the Patterson & Lambdin printing office. An 1816 notice in the Pittsburgh Commonwealth shows mail at the Pittsburgh post office for both Rigdon and Spalding.

In 1884, Lorenzo Saunders gave an interview in which he reportedly claimed that Peter Ingersoll introduced him to Sidney Rigdon in 1827.

Who Wrote the Book of Mormon? by Robert Patterson, the son of the Patterson of Patterson & Lambdin, contains these statements and others by about 30 witnesses who knew the people involved in these events and said they knew the Spalding story was true.

Rigdon's grandson, Walter Sidney Rigdon, said in an interview that the family knew that the "Golden Bible" was a hoax contrived by Rigdon and Joseph Smith Junior to make money and that it was based on the Spalding manuscript.

== J. H. Beadle's version of the theory ==
In J. H. Beadle's 1870 book Life in Utah, a version of the theory is presented with some additional details. Beadle writes that in 1812, Spalding presented Manuscript, Found to a bookseller named Patterson in Pittsburgh, wishing to have it published as a "historical romance, to account for the settlement of America", and proposing to write a fictional preface describing "its having been taken from plates dug up in Ohio". Patterson declined, as he "did not think the enterprise would pay." Beadle writes that Rigdon was then at work in the office of Patterson, who died in 1826. Spalding had died of tuberculosis in 1816, and apparently the manuscript had not been returned, because Beadle said the subsequent fate of that copy of the manuscript was unknown. According to Beadle, Spalding's widow "had another complete copy, but in the year 1825, while residing in Ontario Co., N. Y., next door to a man named Stroude, for whom Joe Smith was digging a well, that copy was also lost. Mrs. Spalding thinks it was stolen from her trunk." Beadle’s story seems to be an abridgement of that in the 1855 book The Mormons: Their Book, Prophets and Mysteries. There, Rigdon was a journeyman printer for the publisher Patterson in Philadelphia. Spalding brought the manuscript to Patterson, they could not come to terms as to its publication, and Spalding left a copy with Patterson, who was intrigued by the story and often read bits aloud to various people. Rigdon sometimes borrowed the manuscript and read it to his co-workers for their amusement; he was fascinated by its oddity, but thought it sounded vastly like truth, with all its absurdities. Rigdon obtained the manuscript when Paterson died in 1826.

== Reaction within the Latter-Day Saint movement ==
Most Mormons give the Spalding–Rigdon theory little credence, believing that it has, as the Maxwell Institute asserts, "fallen on hard times".

In his paper "The Mythical 'Manuscript Found'", Matthew Roper concludes:

Whether one accepts the Spalding explanation or some other theory, one still has to explain not only if, but how Joseph Smith or any other candidate could write such a book, a point upon which critics have never agreed and probably never will agree. The Book of Mormon will always be an enigma for the unbeliever. The Latter-day Saint, of course, already has an explanation that nicely circumvents that puzzle. For those who are unwilling to believe Joseph Smith's explanation of the origin of the Book of Mormon but who still cannot see the ignorant Palmyra plowboy as responsible for its contents, some variation of the Spalding theory with its mythical "Manuscript Found" may be the best fiction they can contrive.

In 1840, Benjamin Winchester, a Mormon defender who had been "deputed ... to hunt up the Hurlbut case", published a book rejecting the Spalding theory as "a sheer fabrication". Winchester attributed the creation of the entire story to Doctor Philastus Hurlbut, one of Howe's researchers.

Of Rigdon's alleged involvement, Rigdon's son John recounted an interview with his father in 1865:

My father, after I had finished saying what I have repeated above, looked at me a moment, raised his hand above his head and slowly said, with tears glistening in his eyes: "My son, I can swear before high heaven that what I have told you about the origin of [the Book of Mormon] is true. Your mother and sister, Mrs. Athalia Robinson, were present when that book was handed to me in Mentor, Ohio, and all I ever knew about the origin of [the Book of Mormon] was what Parley P. Pratt, Oliver Cowdery, Joseph Smith and the witnesses who claimed they saw the plates have told me, and in all of my intimacy with Joseph Smith he never told me but one story."

Daniel C. Peterson contends that there is little or no evidence supporting the Spalding–Rigdon theory and that extensive evidence, including "very sophisticated statistical analysis", renders it "deeply improbable and only desperate necessity would ever have given rise to it in the first place. But the Spalding theory nonetheless limps on in certain circles."

Peterson also argues that the Spalding–Rigdon theory must be placed in the larger historical context of the advent of Mormonism, asserting that "[e]ven so, it doesn't even begin to explain the Witnesses, the Doctrine and Covenants, the Pearl of Great Price, and a host of other matters."

== Computer analysis ==
Computer analyses of The Book of Mormon's authorship have resulted in conflicting results and dueling assertions about which methodologies yield the most reliable analyses.

Early stylometric studies of The Book of Mormon led by the Mormon Foundation for Apologetic Information & Research claimed the Spalding–Rigdon theory had little support from such analysis. A 1990 study by Mormon John Hilton with non-Mormon colleagues at Berkeley concluded that the probability that Spalding was the sole author of the First Book of Nephi was less than 7.29 × 10^{−28} and less than 3 × 10^{−11} for the Book of Alma.

=== Jockers study ===
A 2008 Stanford study (Jockers et al.) of the text of The Book of Mormon compared it to writings of possible authors and found a high probability that its authors were Spalding, Rigdon, and Oliver Cowdery. It concluded, "our analysis supports the theory that the Book of Mormon was written by multiple, nineteenth-century authors, and more specifically, we find strong support for the Spalding–Rigdon theory of authorship. In all the data, we find Rigdon as a unifying force. His signal dominates the book, and where other candidates are more probable, Rigdon is often hiding in the shadows".

The study did not include Smith as one of the possible authors, arguing that because of Smith's use of scribes and co-authors, no texts can be identified with a surety as having been written solely by Smith. Mormon critics of the study have argued that this is a significant problem, claiming that a "naive application of NSC methodology" led to "misleading results" by Jockers et al. because they had used a closed set of seven authors for their study. In their own study (Schaalje et al., 2009), these critics from Brigham Young University found that an open set of candidate authors "produced dramatically different results from a closed-set NSC analysis."

The Jockers study found a strong Spalding signal in the books of Mosiah, Alma, and Ether, and the first half of the Book of Helaman. The Spalding signal was weak in those parts of The Book of Mormon likely produced after the lost pages incident (1 Nephi, 2 Nephi, some of the middle part of 3 Nephi, Moroni). The study found the Rigdon signal distributed throughout the book (except for the known Isaiah chapters), and a weak Pratt signal in 1 Nephi. It also found a strong Cowdery signal in mid-Alma and weaker Cowdery signals in passages that contain content similar to Ethan Smith's View of the Hebrews.

The Schaalje study, also published in the Journal of Literary and Linguistic Computing, critiqued the methodology used by Jockers et al., claiming that the closed-set analysis forced the choosing of a winner while excluding the possibility of an author outside the set. By using Jockers's methodology to analyze the (known) authorship of the Federalist Papers by including and excluding Alexander Hamilton as a candidate author, Jockers's methodology picked Rigdon when Hamilton was excluded. Using Schaalje’s open-set method, Schaalje's method picked "none of the above" when Hamilton was excluded. When Hamilton was included, both Jockers's and Schaalje's method correctly picked Hamilton.

Using Smith's personal writings in his own handwriting, Schaalje's rebuttal concluded that stylometric evidence supports neither Smith's nor Spalding–Rigdon's authorship.
