= Joseph Smith and the Origins of the Book of Mormon =

1985 book by David Persuitte

- Cover of the second edition
- Author: David Persuitte
- Language: English
- Published: 1985
- Publication place: United States
- Media type: Print
- ISBN: 978-0-7864-8403-4 (2nd edition)

Joseph Smith and the Origins of the Book of Mormon is a 1985 book by David Persuitte. A second expanded edition was published in 2000. It provides detailed biographical information about Joseph Smith and background information about the origin of the Book of Mormon. In the book, Persuitte provides a large number of parallels in support of the idea that Joseph Smith used an earlier work, View of the Hebrews, as a source of ideas in creating the Book of Mormon.

One FARMS reviewer, L. Ara Norwood, dubbed Persuitte's book anti-Mormon.

== See also ==
- Criticism of Mormonism
