= Ezra Booth =

Early member and critic of the LDS Church (1792–1873)

- Born: February 14, 1792; Newtown, Connecticut, U.S.
- Died: January 12, 1873 (aged 80); Cuyahoga Falls, Ohio, U.S.
- Resting place: Oakwood Cemetery, Cuyahoga Falls, Ohio
- Occupations: Minister, farmer
- Years active: 1831–1832
- Known for: Criticism of the Church of Christ
- Spouse: Dorcas Taylor
- Children: Almeda Booth

Ezra Booth (February 14, 1792 – January 12, 1873) was an early member in the Latter Day Saint movement who became an outspoken critic of Joseph Smith and the Church of Christ. He was "the first apostate to write publicly against the new Church". Before joining the early Church of Christ in 1831, Booth worked as a Methodist Episcopal minister and a farmer in Ohio. After his baptism, he moved with his family to Kirtland and served as a missionary, preaching in Missouri and Ohio. Booth left the church later in 1831, five months after his baptism. He proceeded to write a series of nine letters denouncing Mormonism that were published by the Ohio Star.

== Early life ==
Booth was born in Newtown, Connecticut, on February 14, 1792. He later moved to Ohio and attended the Methodist Episcopal Church. He became a deacon in the church on August 8, 1818 and then became an elder in 1821. Booth studied Methodist theology in New Haven, Connecticut. He married Dorcas Taylor from Great Barrington, Massachusetts, on November 10, 1819 in Portage County, Ohio. Their only child, a daughter named Almeda, was born on August 15, 1823. Almeda Booth later attended school at the Western Reserve Eclectic Institute with future U.S. president James A. Garfield.

Booth worked as a minister for the Methodist Episcopal Church before becoming a farmer in Nelson, Ohio around the time Almeda was born. Booth's peers reported that he was an intelligent man; he was an avid reader of books and once "purchased a Greek lexicon" and taught himself the Greek language so that he could understand the Greek Bible. After witnessing Joseph Smith heal Elsa Johnson's paralyzed arm, he became a convert to the Church of Christ. Booth had originally brought the Johnsons into the Methodist faith in 1826. According to an account by Nancy Marinda Johnson, Booth obtained a copy of the Book of Mormon one night, and he and John Johnson "sat up all night reading it, and were very much exercised over it." Booth was baptized and ordained an elder in May 1831. He then traveled to Kirtland, Ohio, with Elsa and John Johnson in 1831.

== Involvement in the Latter Day Saint movement ==
Oh June 4, 1831, Booth was ordained a high priest by Lyman Wight in a "log school house" in Kirtland. Booth was reportedly possessed by a "foul spirit" during the meeting, and Joseph Smith "commanded it to depart". On June 6, 1831, he was called to go to Missouri with Isaac Morley and preach the word "by the way". He was described as an "urbane" and "articulate" preacher. Many people, such as Symonds Ryder, were baptized as a result of Booth's preaching. On August 4, 1831, Booth was one of fourteen elders attending the conference called "by special commandment of the Lord" in Kaw township, Jackson County, Missouri. He was present for the laying of the cornerstone of the temple to be built at New Jerusalem. While serving as a missionary, Booth did not experience the success he'd expected to have. He had assumed that he would convert people through the performance of miracles, as had been his experience with Joseph Smith. Because this was not the case, Booth began to distance himself from the church. Of Booth's time in the church, Richard Bushman wrote: "every attempt at healing became a test, and, as his faith waned, he noted only failures, overlooking or not witnessing the successful healings recounted by the believers such as John Whitmer."

== Separation from the church ==
On September 6, 1831, Booth was "silenced from preaching as an Elder" by Joseph Smith, Sidney Rigdon, Oliver Cowdery, and others. Smith stated that the reasons behind this were Booth's dissension with the leaders of the church and his apparent lack of humility. A revelation came to Smith a few days later, and stated that

I, the Lord, was angry with him who was my servant Ezra Booth, and also my servant Isaac Morley, for they kept not the law, neither the commandment; they sought evil in their hearts.... They condemned for evil that thing in which there was no evil; nevertheless I have forgiven my servant Isaac Morley.

== The Ezra Booth letters ==
Less than three days after being "silenced from preaching as an Elder" and after being a member for only five months, Booth renounced Mormonism in the first of nine letters to be published in the Ohio Star, beginning in November 1831. The letters were addressed to the Reverend Ira Eddy of the Methodist Church, whom Booth knew from his days as a Methodist minister and "circuit rider". The Vermont Telegraph reported that Booth's published documents composed "an expose of their [the Mormons'] diabolical pretensions and impositions." Booth's letters focused on three main types of criticism: "inconsistencies he saw in the revelations of Joseph Smith, what he called the 'despotic' tendencies of the Church, and the 'manifest weakness' in the personality of Joseph Smith and other leaders." He also criticized Sidney Rigdon in particular and pointed out the failure of Mormonism to establish itself among the Native Americans in the United States, despite Smith's revelations that those efforts would succeed. The reasons Booth provided for writing the letters included preventing others from falling victim to the church and responding to requests to expose Mormonism that he'd received. In Norton Township (the area to which Booth was sent on his mission), the effect of Booth's letters was such that "the public feeling was, that 'Mormonism' was overthrown". The letters proved to be popular, and the Ohio Star printed the nine of them almost weekly. They helped feed the fear of community members in Kirtland and Hiram, Ohio "regarding the growing power of the Mormon Church." Booth's letters thus prompted Joseph Smith and Sidney Rigdon to travel to northeast Ohio to assess the damage done and dissuade the people from believing Booth's words. In 1832, Booth petitioned the Ohio Star to publish "a vindication of his character from the attacks made upon it by Mr. Ridgon, during his late visit to this place." The newspaper, however, refused Booth's request. His letters were later reprinted by E. D. Howe in his 1834 book Mormonism Unvailed.

== Later years, death, and legacy ==
After leaving the Church of Christ, Booth rejoined the Methodist faith, then became involved in the Millerite Movement. After William Miller's predictions about the Second Coming fell flat, Booth associated with the Shakers from 1845 to 1850. He then reportedly "abandoned Christianity and became an agnostic."

In 1865, Booth moved to Cuyahoga Falls, Ohio. He died on January 12, 1873, at the age of 80. He is buried in Oakwood Cemetery in Cuyahoga Falls next to his wife, Dorcas, and daughter, Almeda. He has been called "the most influential apostate of his time."
