= Michael Linning =

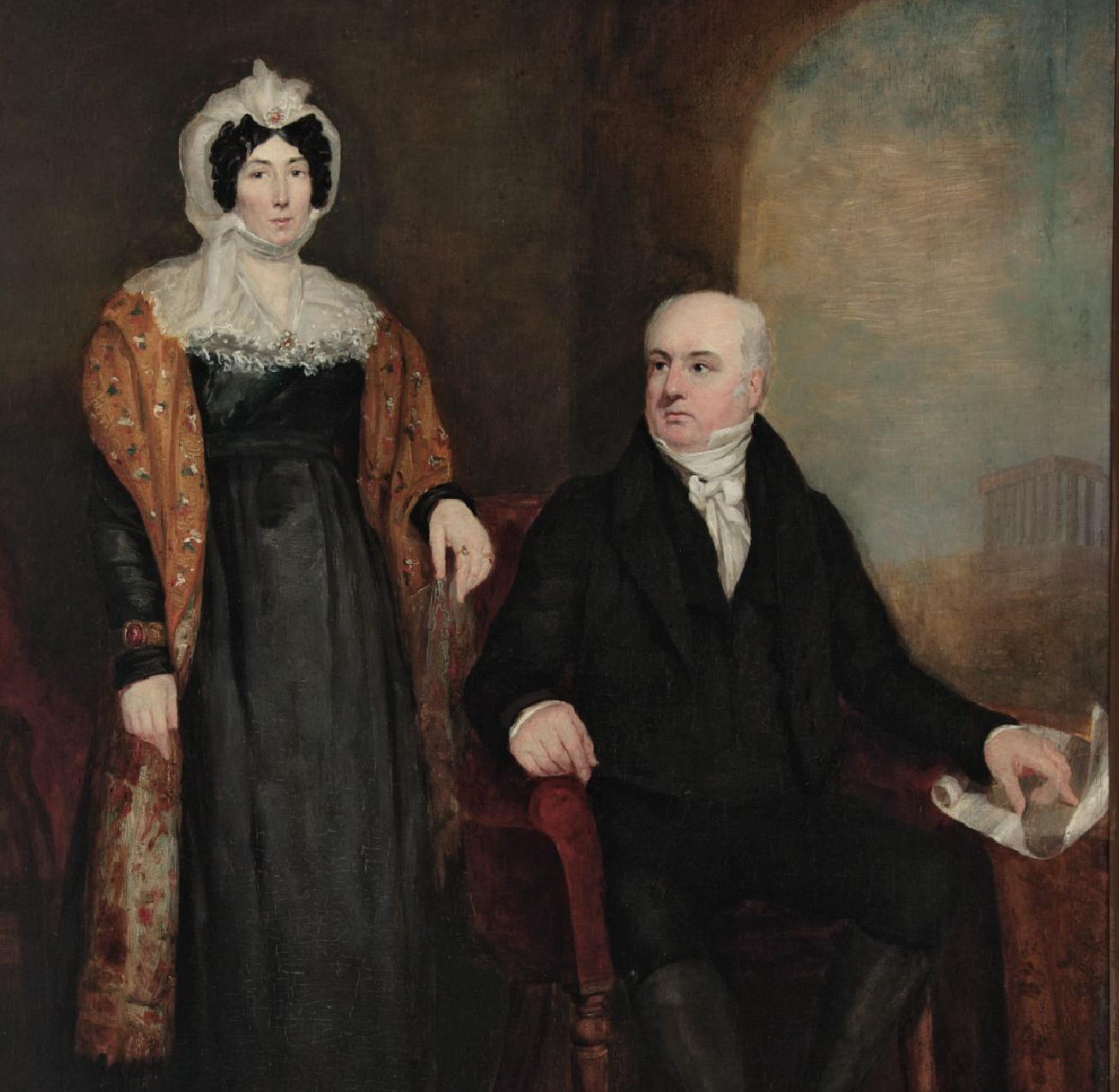
Mr. and Mrs. Michael Linning, 1828 - 1834

Michael Linning WS (24 September 1774 - 17 February 1838) was a Scottish solicitor and the probable author of The First Book of Napoleon. He was the son of Thomas Linning and grandson of the Rev. Thomas Linning, Minister of Lesmahogow. He attended the University of Glasgow from 1788 to 1793.

== Author of the First Book of Napoleon ==
The First Book of Napoleon is a pseudo-biblical work written under the pen name "Eliakim the Scribe". A pre-publication manuscript copy at the State Library of New South Wales identifies Michael Linning as the author. As a Writer to Her Majesty's Signet, Linning's role was very similar to the ancient biblical role of scribe. In addition, the pen name "Eliakim" may be an anadrome of Michael (i.e. "Mikaile").

In February 1810, the British Critic said they readily admitted that the language adopted by this book would be peculiarly effective on the minds of those pious Christians, in humble life, who were accustomed to read and revere their Bibles; but they thought that such persons stood, perhaps, in less need of the admonitions contained in this book than any others; while the price at which a book so elegantly printed could be sold would prevent it from falling into the hands of such persons. The British Critic said that they really regretted this circumstance because the book gave, in language with which such persons were best acquainted, a just view of the principles which led to the French Revolution, to the elevation of Buonaparte to the throne of the Bourbons, and to all the miseries under which Continental Europe had so long groaned; contrasting those miseries with the happiness Britons enjoyed under the mild government of George III. In 1908, The Nation described this pamphlet as being "very curious as well as rare".

== National Monument of Scotland ==
Linning also was Secretary of the Royal Association of Contributors to the National Monument of Scotland, which he in 1816 proposed as a memorial to Scottish soldiers and sailors who died fighting the Napoleonic Wars.

== Inventor of Peat to Fuel Conversion ==
In a history of the parish of Mid-Calder, historian Hardy M'Call describes Linning and his work on peat moss conversion to fuel:

Mr. Linning was a man of inventive mind. Among his many projects, which were to have united the welfare of mankind at large with the development of his own estate, was a scheme for the conversion of peat into portable fuel... The scene of these experiments is marked by a stone chimney, which still remains on the lands of Colzium, though partially shattered by the memorable thunderstorm of 12th August 1884.

The patent application is recorded in February 1837.
