= Solomon Spalding =

American author (1761–1816)

- Born: February 20, 1761; Ashford, Connecticut
- Died: October 20, 1816 (aged 55); Amity, Washington County, Pennsylvania
- Other name: Also spelled "Spaulding" in some sources
- Known for: Spalding–Rigdon theory of Book of Mormon authorship
- Notable work: Manuscript Found
- Spouse: Matilda Sabin
- Children: Matilda McKinstry

Solomon Spalding (also spelled Spaulding; February 20, 1761 – October 20, 1816) was an American author who wrote two related texts: an unfinished manuscript entitled Manuscript Story – Conneaut Creek, and an unpublished historical romance about the lost civilization of the mound builders of North America called Manuscript Found. Whether these texts are distinct is disputed. As none of his work was ever published, the titles are only working titles and thus not fixed. After Spalding's death, a number of individuals suggested that Spalding's work was used as a source by Joseph Smith Jr for the Book of Mormon, a scripture in the Latter Day Saint movement. Those claims are disputed by the Church of Jesus Christ of Latter-Day Saints.

== Biography ==
Spalding was born in Ashford, Connecticut to Josiah Spaulding Sr (1729–1809) and Priscilla Paine Spaulding (1734–1817). He was a member of the Continental Army during the American Revolutionary War. In 1782, he entered Dartmouth College in Hanover, New Hampshire, graduating with the class of 1785. In October 1787, he became an ordained Congregationalist preacher in Windham, Connecticut.

In 1795, Spalding married Matilda D Sabin (1805–1891) and opened a store with his younger brother Josiah Spaulding Jr (1765–1859) in Cherry Valley, New York. In 1799, they moved the store to Richfield, New York. Around this time, Spalding bought a tract of land in and relocated to Conneaut, Ohio. While in Conneaut, Spalding began writing Manuscript, Found. In 1812, due to the disruptions of the War of 1812, Spalding moved to Pittsburgh, Pennsylvania. In 1814, he moved to Amity, Pennsylvania, where he died two years later.

== The Oberlin Manuscript ==
From 1809 to 1812, Spalding worked on a historical fiction about a Roman discovery of the Americas. An unfinished manuscript copy of this work exists, called "The Oberlin Manuscript" or "Honolulu Manuscript". It is a historical romance "purporting to have been translated from the Latin, found on 24 rolls of parchment in a cave, on the banks of the Conneaut Creek". It tells of a Roman ship which discovers America.

The text of the Oberlin Manuscript was published by the Reorganized Church of Jesus Christ of Latter Day Saints (RLDS Church) in 1885, and by The Church of Jesus Christ of Latter-day Saints (LDS Church) in 1886 and 1910 under the name Manuscript, Found. In Eber D. Howe's anti-Mormon book Mormonism Unvailed, family members and other witnesses claimed that the true title of the Oberlin Manuscript is actually Manuscript Story – Conneaut Creek, and that Spalding penned another manuscript titled Manuscript, Found which bore no resemblance to the Oberlin Manuscript.

== Other manuscript ==
Around 1812, Spalding allegedly completed a historical romance distinct from the Oberlin Manuscript which "purported to have been a record found buried in the earth". Spalding moved to Pittsburgh and reportedly took this manuscript to the publisher Patterson & Lambdin, but Spalding died in 1816 before the manuscript could be published.

Unlike the Oberlin Manuscript, there is, to date, no physical evidence of this first manuscript, so the details of this other manuscript are based on testimonies originally published some twenty years later in Mormonism Unvailed.

=== Alleged contents of second manuscript ===
Plot

According to John Spalding, Solomon's brother, the plot of Manuscript, Found told "of the first settlers of America, endeavoring to show that the American Indians are the descendants of the Jews, or the lost tribes. "Spaulding’s fiction is about a group of Romans blown off course on a journey to Britain who arrive instead in America. One of the Romans narrates the adventures of the group and the history and culture of the people they find in America." Cruel and bloody wars ensued, in which great multitudes were slain. They buried their dead in large heaps, which caused the mounds so common in this country." Spalding gave this as an affidavit to be published in Eber D. Howe's anti-Mormon book Mormonism Unvailed.

Phraseology

Those who claim to have seen the second manuscript testified that it was written "in scripture style of writing" and recalled its repetitive usage of phrases like "and it came to pass" or "now it came to pass", as well as the repeated phrase "I Nephi".

=== Reliability of witness accounts of a second manuscript ===
Some modern scholars question the validity of the eyewitness accounts of this second manuscript. Fawn Brodie, in No Man Knows My History, was skeptical of the witness statements.

== Theorized usage of Spalding's work in Book of Mormon ==
In 1832, Latter Day Saint missionaries Samuel H. Smith and Orson Hyde visited Conneaut, Ohio, and preached from the Book of Mormon. Nehemiah King, a resident of Conneaut who knew Spalding when he lived there, said that the Mormon text resembled the story written by Spalding years before. In 1833, Spalding's brother John and seven other residents of Conneaut signed affidavits stating that Spalding had written a manuscript, portions of which were identical to the Book of Mormon. These statements were published in E. D. Howe's 1834 book Mormonism Unvailed, in which the theory was presented that the Book of Mormon was plagiarized from this manuscript. Several years later, Spalding's widow and daughter, other residents of Conneaut, and residents of Amity, Pennsylvania, also signed statements indicating that Spalding had authored a manuscript that was similar to the Book of Mormon.

"I well remember that he wrote in the old style, and commenced about every sentence with 'and it came to pass,' or 'now it came to pass,' the same as in the Book of Mormon, and according to the best of my recollection and belief, it is the same as my brother Solomon wrote, with the exception of the religious matter."

In 1927, Professor Azariah S. Root, who had headed the library at Oberlin College, wrote a letter regarding the origins of the Spalding Manuscript and how it relates to the Book of Mormon. In it he states that the Spalding document to which he had access, The Oberlin Manuscript, "seems pretty clearly not to have been the manuscript from which the Book of Mormon was written". Since neither Root nor anybody else had possession of Spalding's alleged second manuscript, he stated that The Oberlin Manuscript "does not seem to throw very much light" on the question of whether the second manuscript was used as a basis for the Book of Mormon.

== See also ==
- View of the Hebrews
