= Studies of the Book of Mormon =

Collection of essays by B. H. Roberts

- Cover of recent edition
- Author: Brigham Henry Roberts
- Subject: Book of Mormon
- Publisher: University of Illinois Press
- Publication date: 1985
- Publication place: United States
- Media type: Print
- ISBN: 978-1-56085-027-4
- OCLC: 26216024
- Dewey Decimal: 289.3/22 20
- LC Class: BX8627 .R59 1992

Studies of the Book of Mormon is a collection of essays written at the beginning of the 20th century (though not published until 1985) by B. H. Roberts (1857–1933), a general authority of the Church of Jesus Christ of Latter-day Saints (LDS Church), which examine the validity of the Book of Mormon as a translation of an ancient American source.

Roberts "served in the innermost circles of Mormonism" and for decades "used his great oratorical and writing skills, as well as his scholarly and research abilities, to defend the Book of Mormon and give it intellectual respectability." According to Brigham Young University professor Marvin S. Hill, controversy over the book "has focused not upon the historical issues which Roberts raised but rather on whether or not he lost his testimony of the book and the church."

Critics of Mormonism claim that Roberts lost his belief in the Book of Mormon after completing the study, even though he continued to publicly affirm the divine origin of the book. According to religion writer Richard N. Ostling, Mormon apologists were faced with one "of the most delicate situations" after publication of the book and "went into high gear" to make responses to it because "Roberts could not be dismissed as an outsider or an anti-Mormon."

== Roberts's purpose and conclusion ==
In the early 1920s, Roberts was asked by the First Presidency of the LDS Church to develop an apologetic to explain difficulties in the Book of Mormon, such as the lack of Hebrew or Egyptian vestiges in the languages of the Native American peoples and such historical anachronisms in the Book of Mormon as mentions of horses, oxen, wheat, and steel swords in ancient America.

Roberts also compared the Book of Mormon with Ethan Smith's View of the Hebrews (1823), published five years before the Book of Mormon. Smith, a Vermont clergyman, drew on, what were at the time, commonplace ideas about the relationship of the Hebrews and the American Indians. Not only did Smith's work go through many early editions, but Oliver Cowdery, Joseph Smith's scribe and one of the Three Witnesses to the golden plates, grew up in the Vermont town where Ethan Smith pastored the church and where Cowdery's mother and half-sisters were members. According to religion writer Richard Ostling, "it is probably safe to assume that Joseph Smith was familiar" with Ethan Smith's book.

Roberts summarized his comparison of the parallels between View of the Hebrews and the Book of Mormon as follows:

Did Ethan Smith's View of the Hebrews furnish structural material for Joseph Smith's Book of Mormon? It has been pointed out in these pages that there are many things in the former book that might well have suggested many major things in the other. Not a few things merely, one or two, or half dozen, but many; and it is this fact of many things of similarity and the cumulative force of them that makes them so serious a menace to Joseph Smith's story of the Book of Mormon's origin.

— B.H. Roberts, Studies of the Book of Mormon, pg. 240

Roberts was "torn by an internal struggle between his faith and a desire to be honest with himself." Roberts believed that Mormonism must "stand or fall" on the truth of Joseph Smith's claim that the Book of Mormon was the history of an ancient people inscribed on golden plates and revealed to him by an angel. Yet in his studies, Roberts cited examples of what he considered discrepancies, implausibilities and contradictions in the Book of Mormon. According to Marvin S. Hill, Roberts "maintained that the Book of Mormon's claims that the Indians were derived solely from three migrations of Hebrews to the new world over a span of three thousand years was entirely untenable." And Roberts concluded that the "evidence I sorrowfully submit" pointed to Joseph Smith as the Book of Mormon's creator.

Although Roberts's manuscripts were intended for perusal by the general authorities of the LDS Church, the authorities proved uninterested in examining them. Roberts argued that his study was "of very great importance since it represents what may be used by some opponent in criticism of the Book of Mormon." He also warned that the problems described would haunt the church "both now and also in the future" and, unless answered, they would undermine "the faith of the Youth of the Church."

== Overview ==
Roberts gave three conditions that would suggest that one book had been derived from another: that the derivative book had appeared after its model, that the author of the derivative book had access to the model, and that the derivative work be similar to the model. Roberts concluded that View of the Hebrews had been published first, that the possibility that Joseph Smith had access to it was "a very close certainty," and that there were many similarities between the works. The bulk of Roberts's manuscript considers the similarities between View of the Hebrews and the Book of Mormon.

=== Origin of New World peoples ===
Roberts states that both View of the Hebrews and the Book of Mormon claim that the Hebrews "occupied the whole extent of the American continents" and that this idea was "very generally obtained throughout New England." Modern Mormon apologists argue a limited geography theory of the Book of Mormon civilizations, which Roberts himself did not believe "the Book of Mormon would admit our assuming."

=== Migration ===
Both View of the Hebrews and the Book of Mormon refer to a migration of peoples to America. Roberts notes several parallels between the migration of the Jaredites and that of the Ten Lost Tribes in the Jewish apocalypse 2 Esdras (as interpreted by Ethan Smith). Both journeys are "religiously motivated, both groups enter valleys at the commencement of their journeys, both apparently travel north between the Tigris and Euphrates Rivers, both cross water barriers, both trips take years, and both groups travel to uninhabited lands."

=== Destruction of Jerusalem ===
Roberts notes that the entire first chapter of View of the Hebrews describes the siege of Jerusalem by the Romans in AD 70. He compares this chapter to the first chapters of the Book of Mormon, in which Lehi prophesies of the destruction of Jerusalem prior to his departure circa 600 BC. Mormon apologists argue that View of the Hebrews does not refer to the earlier destruction of Jerusalem by the Babylonians circa 586 BC.

=== Lost books ===
In View of the Hebrews, "an old Indian" said that his ancestors "had a book which they had for a long time preserved," but that "having lost the knowledge of reading it ... they buried it with an Indian chief." View of the Hebrews mentions a Jewish phylactery dug from the ground which "contained four folded leaves" of "dark yellow" parchment. Roberts compares this story with Joseph Smith's retrieval of the golden plates in a New York hillock, and adds the question, "Could all this have supplied structural work for the Book of Mormon?"

=== Breastplate and the Urim and Thummin ===
View of the Hebrews describes a breastplate "in resemblance of the Urim and Thummin" made of a white conch shell with two holes to which are fastened white buckhorn buttons "as if in imitation of the precious stones of the Urim." Roberts compares this to the Urim and Thummim which Joseph Smith said that he was given for the purpose of translating the golden plates.

=== "Egyptian" hieroglyphics ===
View of the Hebrews describes hieroglyphic paintings found in the American southwest. Roberts wrote, "Was this sufficient to suggest the strange manner of writing the Book of Mormon ... in an altered Egyptian?" (Joseph Smith said that the golden plates were written in "reformed Egyptian".)

=== Barbarous versus civilized New World people ===
View of the Hebrews argues that the Hebrews who arrived on the American continents divided into two classes, that "most of them fell into a wandering idle hunting life" but that "more sensible parts of this people associated together to improve their knowledge of the arts." The more civilized portion of this society separated from the more primitive group, who "lost the knowledge of their having descended from the same family." As a result of "tremendous wars," the civilized group "became extinct." In the Book of Mormon, the Nephites and Lamanites also split into two groups and have frequent wars, which ultimately result in the extinction of the more civilized Nephites.

=== Government ===
In both View of the Hebrews and the Book of Mormon, part of the ancient inhabitants of America changed from monarchical governments to republican governments, and the civil and ecclesiastical power was united in the same person.

=== Prophecy about the scattering and gathering of Israel ===
Roberts notes that in both View of the Hebrews and the Book of Mormon there are extensive quotations from the Book of Isaiah regarding the scattering and future gathering of Israel. Roberts asks, "Did the Author of the Book of Mormon follow too closely the course of Ethan Smith in this use of Isaiah would be a legitimate query." Mormon apologists reply that View of the Hebrews includes many other scriptural prophecies about the restoration of Israel, whereas the Book of Mormon quotes only from Isaiah chapter 11.

=== White god in the New World ===
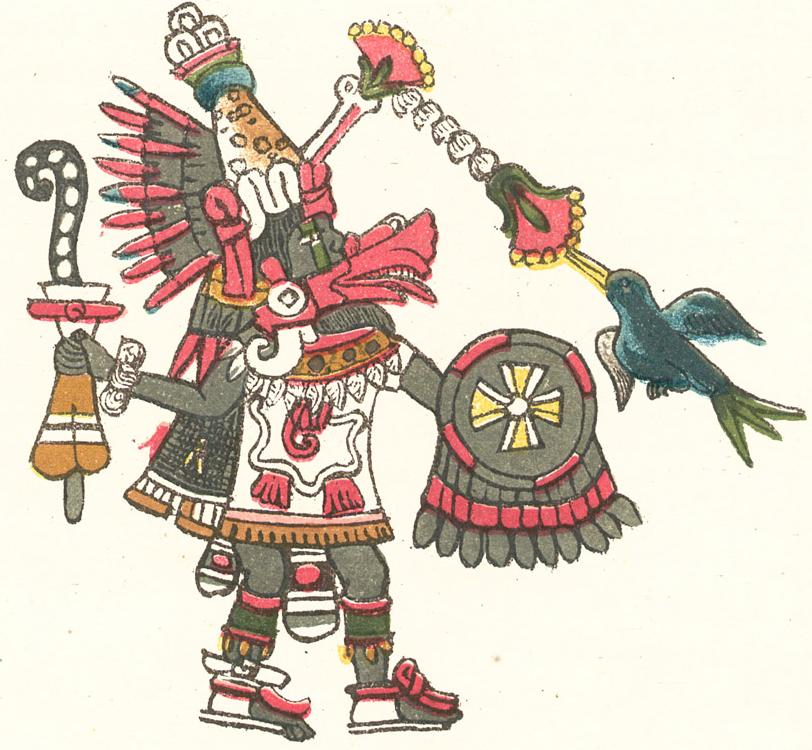
Quetzalcoatl as depicted in the Codex Magliabechiano

View of the Hebrews discusses legends of what he called the "bearded white god" Quetzalcoatl and proposes that this "lawgiver" or "Mexican messiah" might have been Moses. Ethan Smith also suggests that this belief held by the people of Mexico at the time of Montezuma allowed the Spanish to easily conquer the country because "the Mexicans mistook the white bearded invaders from the east for the descendants of their long cherished culture-hero Quetzalcoatl." Roberts asks rhetorically if "this character spoken of in the View of the Hebrews" furnished the suggestion of Jesus Christ in the New World in the Book of Mormon.

== Controversy about Roberts's parallels ==
While many Mormons are unsurprisingly wont to dismiss the parallels as not indicative that View of the Hebrews is source material for the Book of Mormon and sometimes do so complaining that the comparisons are inexact or the details do not match precisely, the argument that the book was source material, of course, does not imply that all details should match.

== Controversy about Roberts's ultimate beliefs ==
Roberts's belief in the Book of Mormon may have been shaken by his research. For instance, a reviewer of the book for The Christian Century wrote that not only did Roberts "have serious doubts" about the Book of Mormon, but that his investigations raised "questions about his own beliefs." Mormon apologists have replied that Roberts must have been playing devil's advocate, because he continued to testify to the truth of the Book of Mormon until his death. Marvin S. Hill has argued, however, "this contention seems strained considering his pleadings at the end of each section that church leaders must offer inspired help." Mormon apologists have also argued that Sterling McMurrin and Brigham D. Madsen, who edited the volume, "misrepresented Roberts's final views about the historicity of Mormon scriptures."

== Controversy within the LDS Church after the 1985 publication ==
The publication of Roberts's study "caused much protest in some circles in Utah." Sterling McMurrin, a University of Utah philosophy professor, even "charged that there was an unsuccessful effort to have the University of Illinois suppress publication of the study." According to writer Robert Lindsay, "Church leaders struggled to hold back the tide of research and regain control over the past."

In 1996, many years after Roberts's study had been available through Jerald and Sandra Tanner, prominent critics of the church, and more than a decade after the University of Illinois had published Roberts's Study, BYU republished View of the Hebrews.
