= Brigham D. Madsen =

American historian (1914–2010)

- Born: Brigham Dwaine Madsen; October 21, 1914; Magna, Utah, U.S.
- Died: December 24, 2010 (aged 96)
- Education: Idaho State College (Assoc. Arts, 1934); University of Utah (1938); University of California, Berkeley (PhD, 1948)
- Occupation: Professor
- Employer: University of Utah (1965–1984)
- Spouse: Mary Harriman Madsen (m. 2003)
- Awards: Utah State Historical Society (military history: Glory Hunter); Westerners International (books: North to Montana!; Shoshoni Frontier); John Whitmer Historical Association (book: as editor, B. H. Roberts' Studies of the Book of Mormon)

Brigham Dwaine Madsen (October 21, 1914 – December 24, 2010) was an American historian with an emphasis on indigenous peoples of the American West, the people of Utah and surrounding states, and Mormonism. He was a longtime professor at the University of Utah.

Madsen published six books on the Shoshone-Bannock. In Madsen's later life, he became a proponent Book of Mormon studies anchored in the 19th Century context of the book's publication rather than a focus on the ancient setting of the book's narrative. Madsen edited the previously unpublished, early-20th-century Studies of the Book of Mormon by B. H. Roberts (1857–1933).

== Publications ==
=== Books ===
- Betty M. Madsen; —— (1998) [1980]. North to Montana!: Jehus, Bullwhackers, and Mule Skinners on the Montana Trail. Utah State University Press. ISBN 9780874212594.
- —— (1979). The Lemhi: Sacajawea's People. Caxton Printers. ISBN 9780870042676.
- —— (1958). The Bannock of Idaho. University of Idaho Press.
- —— (1980). The Northern Shoshoni. Caxton Press. ISBN 9780870042669.
- ——. The Shoshoni frontier and the Bear River massacre. University of Utah Press., ISBN 9780874804942
- —— (1986). Chief Pocatello, the "White Plume". University of Utah Press. ISBN 9780874802566. University of Idaho Press
- —— (ed.). Studies of the Book of Mormon by B. H Roberts.
- ——. Gold Rush sojourners in Great Salt Lake City, 1849 and 1850.
- ——. Glory hunter: a biography of Patrick Edward Connor.
- ——. Exploring the Great Salt Lake: the Stansbury Expedition of 1849-50.
- ——. The Now generation: student essays on social change in the sixties. University of Utah
- —— (ed.). A forty-niner in Utah: with the Stansbury exploration of Great Salt Lake: letters and journal of John Hudson, 1848-50.
- —— (1980). Corinne: the gentile capital of Utah. University State Historical Society.
- —— (ed.). The essential B.H. Roberts.
- R. N Baskin. —— (ed.). Reminiscences of early Utah: with, Reply to certain statements by O.F. Whitney.
- ——. History of the upper Snake River valley, 1807-1825.
- Daniel Sylvester Tuttle (1987). —— (ed.). Missionary to the Mountain West: reminiscences of Episcopal Bishop Daniel S. Tuttle, 1866-1886. University of Utah Press. ISBN 9780874803051.
- ——. Against the grain: memoirs of a western historian.

=== Essays and pamphlets ===
- ——. Encounter with the Northwestern Shoshoni at Bear River in 1863: battle or massacre?. Weber State College Press, 1984.
