= The Late War between the United States and Great Britain =

1816 book in Early Modern English by Gilbert J. Hunt about the War of 1812

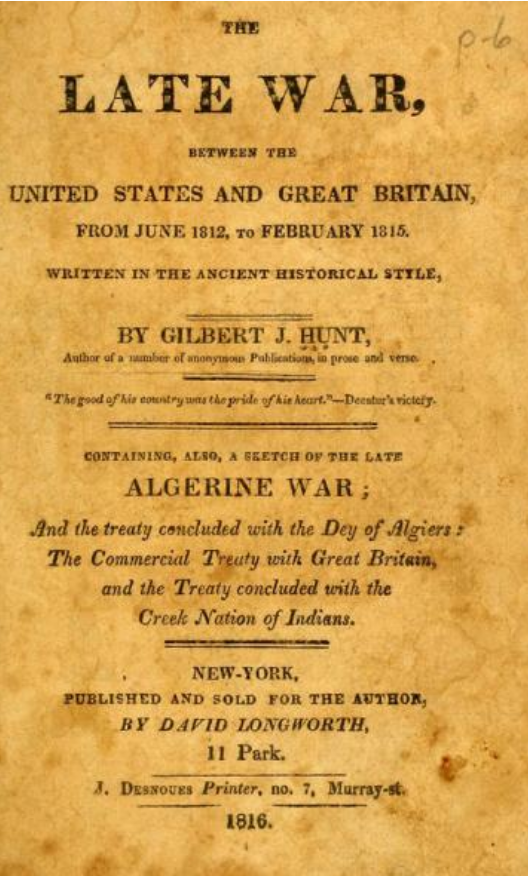
Cover of the 1816 edition of The Late War between the United States and Great Britain

The Late War between the United States and Great Britain is an educational text written by Gilbert J. Hunt and published in New York in 1816. The Late War is an account of the War of 1812 written in the style of the King James Bible.

== Contents ==
The Late War is a history of the War of 1812. It begins with President James Madison and the congressional declaration of war, writing "James, whose sir-name was Madison, delivered a written paper to the Great Sanhedrin of the people, who were assembled together." It continues, later describing the Burning of Washington, the Battle of New Orleans, and the Treaty of Ghent.

The Late War was written in "biblical style", that is, emulating the style of the King James Bible, and is published with chapter and verse notation. For example, the author introduces the Battle of Queenstown with the text:

AND it came to pass, on the morning of the thirteenth day of the tenth month,2 That Stephen, a chief captain of Columbia, sir-named Van Rensselaer, essayed to cross the river which is called Niagara, with his whole army.

Near the conclusion of the work, the Battle of New Orleans is described:

And it came to pass, in the one thousand eight hundred and fifteenth year of the Christian era, in the first month of the year, and on the eighth day of the month, Being on the Sabbath day, (which, as it is written in the scriptures, Thou shalt remember and keep HOLY,) That the mighty army of the king, which had moved out of the strong ships of Britain, came, in their strength, to make conquest of the territory of Columbia, which lieth to the south;

== 3rd Edition Preface ==
In the third edition (1819), G J Hunt added a preface encouraging the use of the work in schools:

"The reception of it into schools, will render familiar to children the chief actions in the contest [the War], and teach them, at the same time, to respect their country and its institutions."
"It seems to me one of the best attempts to imitate the biblical style; and if the perusal of it can induce young persons to relish and love the sacred books whose language you have imitated, it will be the strongest of all recommendations."

== Association with the Book of Mormon ==
In the 21st century, speculation arose that The Late War influenced the 1830 work The Book of Mormon. In 2013 two brothers, Chris and Duane Johnson, speculated that early in his life, Joseph Smith had read the book and have concluded that the book heavily influenced his writing of The Book of Mormon.

Latter-day Saint historians dismiss the claim that Joseph Smith ever read the book, as no historical sources exists to support it, and they reject the idea that he was influenced by it in his writing of the Book of Mormon, suggesting instead that the large number of minor overlaps between the two texts can be best explained by the shared linguistic environments both were written in and the statistical probabilities of language use. Significant borrowing would have likely involved more substantial and unique phrases or ideas being replicated in a way that transcends mere coincidence or common linguistic influence.
