= Mormonism Unvailed =

1834 book by Eber D. Howe

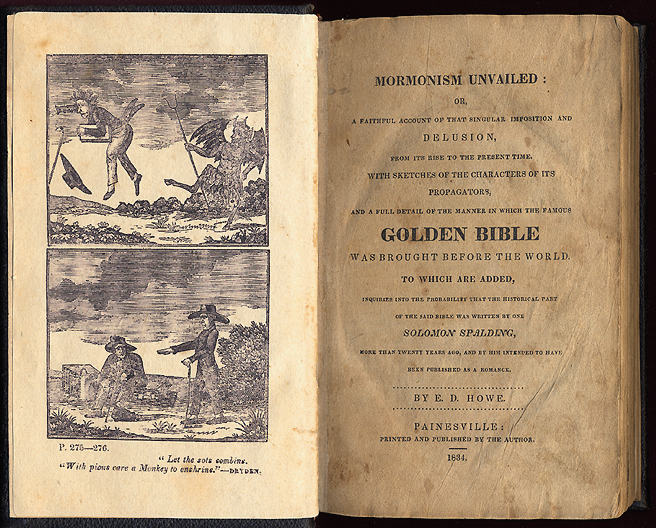
- Frontispiece and title page from Mormonism Unvailed
- Author: Eber D. Howe
- Language: English
- Subject: Mormonism
- Publisher: Eber D. Howe
- Publication date: 1834
- Publication place: United States
- Media type: Print
- Pages: 290
- OCLC: 10395314
- Text: Mormonism Unvailed at Wikisource

Mormonism Unvailed [sic] is a book published in 1834 by Eber D. Howe. The title page proclaims the book to be a contemporary exposé of Mormonism, and makes the claim that the historical portion of the Book of Mormon text was based upon a manuscript written by Solomon Spalding.

"A faithful account of that singular imposition and delusion, from its rise to the present time. With sketches of the characters of its propagators, and a full detail of the manner in which the famous Golden Bible was brought before the world. To which are added, inquiries into the probability that the historical part of the said Bible was written by one Solomon Spalding, more than twenty years ago, and by him intended to have been published as a romance."

The publication of Mormonism Unvailed is significant in Mormon history as it is considered to be the first anti-Mormon book. The book represented the first significant opposition to Mormonism by an author who had actually addressed the contents of the Book of Mormon.

Of the many subjects discussed in the book, two had a significantly lasting impact. The first of these was the publication of a number of affidavits and other statements related to the character of Joseph Smith and Martin Harris. The second significant item was the introduction of a popular early authorship theory for the Book of Mormon known as the "Spalding–Rigdon theory of Book of Mormon authorship".

== Overview ==
The full title of the book is Mormonism Unvailed: Or, A Faithful Account of That Singular Imposition and Delusion from Its Rise to the Present Time. With Sketches of the Characters of Its Propagators, and a Full Detail of the Manner in Which the Famous Golden Bible Was Brought Before the World. To Which Are Added, Inquiries into the Probability That the Historical Part of the Said Bible Was Written by One Solomon Spalding, More Than Twenty Years Ago, and by Him Intended to Have Been Published As a Romance.

- Chapter 1 discusses the character of Joseph Smith and his family as well as "some of the principal actors in the imposition." Howe presents "old Joseph and wife, the parents of the pretended Prophet, as lazy, indolent, ignorant and superstitious" and "not much disposed to obtain an honorable livelihood by labor".
- Chapters 2 discusses the production of the Book of Mormon, or "Golden Bible".
- Chapters 3 to 7 discuss the contents of the Book of Mormon itself. Howe begins with a comment regarding the style in which the book was written: "The whole work is written in a miserable attempt to imitate the style of King James the first."
- Chapter 8 discusses the conversion and involvement of Sidney Rigdon. Howe remarks on reports that "Rigdon has been the Iago, the prime mover, of the whole conspiracy. Of this, however, we have no positive proof."
- Chapter 9 deals more with Rigdon during his time in Kirkland. Included in the chapter is a lengthy letter to Rigdon from Thomas Campbell, who refers to Rigdon as "a professed disciple and public teacher of the infernal book of Mormon." Regarding the letter, Howe states, "after Rigdon had read a few lines of the above, he hastily committed it to the flames." Unexplained is the ability of Howe to reproduce Campbell's letter in its entirety, covering a full seven-and-a-half pages in his book, after Rigdon burned it.
- Chapter 10 deals with alleged Mormon practices of healing and the execution of missionary work "by sending abroad every thing that could walk, no matter how ignorant".
- Chapter 11 discusses the "gift of tongues". Howe comments: "This gibberish for several months was practiced almost daily".
- Chapter 12 discusses the conflicts of the Mormons with the inhabitants of Jackson County, Missouri.
- Chapters 13 and 14 deal with the expedition of "Zion's Camp".
- Chapter 15 includes a number of letters written by Methodist clergyman Ezra Booth.
- Chapter 16 addresses the subject of Mormon revelations.
- Chapter 17 includes a set of affidavits collected by Doctor Philastus Hurlbut, which discuss the character of Joseph Smith and Martin Harris.
- Chapter 18 discusses the visit of Martin Harris to Charles Anthon.
- Chapter 19 introduces the claim that the Book of Mormon plagiarized from a manuscript written by Solomon Spalding.

== Hurlbut affidavits ==
Howe introduces the section containing the affidavits by stating:

"We next present to the reader a few, among the many despositions which have been obtained from the neighborhood of the Smith family, and the scene where the far famed Gold Bible had its pretended origin."

The affidavits attesting to the character of Joseph Smith were collected by Doctor (Note: The term "Doctor" was not a title but Hurlbut's first given name.) Philastus Hurlbut. The affidavits themselves are not known to exist outside of their printing in Mormonism Unvailed. One purpose of the affidavits was to discredit the Smith family by emphasizing their treasure-seeking activities as a negative reflection upon their character. In doing so, some of those providing the statements revealed their own involvement with treasure-seeking as well. Martin Harris was also the subject of a number of these statements.

Hurlbut had previously been excommunicated on charges of immorality. A contemporary author discusses Hurlbut's background and noted that prior to joining the LDS church, he was a member of a Methodist congregation but was "expelled for unvirtuous conduct with a young lady". As a member, Hurlbut "immediately commenced his old practices, in attempting to seduce a young female ... for this crime he was immediately expelled from the church." In response to his expulsion from the church, Hurlbut "now determined to demolish, as far as practicable, what he had once endeavoured to build up".

Hurlbut traveled to Palmyra and the surrounding regions at the request of an Ohio anti-Mormon committee for the purpose of "collecting statements disparaging to the Smith name". (Note: Jessee states that Hurlbut's task was to "obtain information that would show 'the bad character of the Mormon Smith Family', divest Joseph of 'all claims to the character of an honest man', and place him at an 'immeasurable distance from the high station he pretends to occupy. To accomplish his task, Hurlbut traveled in Ohio, New York, and Pennsylvania collecting statements disparaging to the Smith name.")

LDS scholars have challenged the Hurlbut affidavits, claiming that they appear to contain "selected rather than random comments" and that they "appear to be hearsay and gossip rather than a reflection of firsthand knowledge".

=== Manchester residents ===
Eleven residents of the Manchester area signed the following statement: "We, the undersigned, being personally acquainted with the family of Joseph Smith, sen. with whom the celebrated Gold Bible, so called, originated, state: that they were not only a lazy, indolent set of men, but also intemperate; and their word was not to be depended upon; and that we are truly glad to dispense with their society". (Note: It is not known whether or not Hurlbut authored this statement before it was attested to by these individuals.)

One LDS scholar points out the contradiction: "the large household of ten Smiths survived a dozen years without seriously working but spent days and nights in seeking treasures and finding none." Smith himself wrote in his journal:

"At the age of about ten years my Father Joseph Smith, Siegnior [Senior], moved to Palmyra, Ontario County in the State of New York. And being in indigent circumstances [we] were obliged to labour hard for the support of a large Family having nine Chilldren. As it required the exertions of all that were able to render any assistance for the support of the Family, therefore we were deprived of the bennifit of an education. Suffice it to say I was merely instructed in reading, writing, and the ground rule of Arithmatic which const[it]uted my whole literary acquirements."

=== Affidavit of Willard Chase ===
Willard Chase was a friend of Joseph Smith. According to one author, ordinary people at the time had "no difficulty blending Christianity with magic" and described Chase as "the most vigorous of the Manchester treasure-seekers" as well as a Methodist class leader.

==== Discovery of a "seer" stone ====
The Willard Chase affidavit discusses the joint discovery that he and Joseph Smith made of a "seer" stone while digging a well together. Chase states that Smith claimed to be able to see things in the stone and allowed it to remain in Smith's possession for several years. Chase describes how he wanted the stone back and sent a friend to the Smiths' house to view it. The response related by Chase is that his friend said that Smith said, "I don't care who in the Devil it belongs to, you shall not have it."

LDS scholars note that Chase's statements all represent second or third-hand accounts. They also note that Chase was just as involved in treasure-seeking as Joseph Smith and so perhaps envied the seer stone once he became aware of its purported abilities.

==== Toad as a treasure guardian ====
The Chase affidavit relates a conversation that he had with Joseph Smith's father in June 1827. The story relates to Smith's claim to have seen an angel named Moroni at the time that he was attempting to retrieve from a stone box the Golden Plates from which the Book of Mormon is said to have been translated. According to Chase, there were certain requirements related to treasure-seeking that Smith had to fulfill so that he would be able to obtain the plates. (Note: Chase claimed, "On the 22d of September, [Smith] must repair to the place where was deposited this manuscript, dressed in black clothes, and riding a black horse with a switch tail, and demand the book in a certain name, and after obtaining it, he must go directly away, and neither lay it down nor look behind him.") One statement attributed by Chase to Joseph Smith, Sr., is that Smith, Jr., "saw in the box something like a toad, which soon assumed the appearance of a man, and struck him on the side of his head". Years later, Chase's brother-in-law, Benjamin Saunders, claimed that he heard the story directly from Joseph Smith. By 1893, Saunders's nephew was "quoting" Joseph Smith as having said that the animal was an "enormous toad" which turned into a "flaming monster with glittering eyes". According to the author D. Michael Quinn, early American folk traditions associate the toad with "Satanism, black magic, sorcery, and witchcraft. ... If anything changed from the appearance of a toad to the appearance of a person, that thing was an evil spirit, or a witch, or a bewitched person".

LDS scholars suggest that Chase and others "intentionally portrayed Moroni as a particular type of treasure guardian incompatible with an angel".

=== Affidavit of Isaac Hale ===
Isaac Hale was the father-in-law of Joseph Smith Jr. Hale's affidavit concerns his belief that the story of the translation of the gold plates was a delusion on the part of Smith and his associates. Hale states:

"I told them, that I considered the whole of it a delusion, and advised them to abandon it. The manner in which he pretended to read and interpret, was the same as when he looked for the money-diggers, with the stone in his hat, and his hat over his face, while the Book of Plates were at the same time hid in the woods!"

One author suggests that Hurlbut did not obtain the Isaac Hale affidavit but was instead published first in a local newspaper, the Susquehanna Register, on 1 May 1834 and that Howe simply reprinted the letter in Mormonism Unvailed. Howe does not single out the source of Hale's statement other than to state that it was "[a]ffirmed to and subscribed before me, March 20, 1834. Charles Dimon, J. Peace" of Susquehanna County, approximately one-and-a-half months before its publication in the Susquehanna Register. Howe's introduction to the affidavit section of his book implies that all statements (including Hale's) contained therein were obtained as "depositions".

=== Affidavit of Lucy Harris ===
Lucy Harris was the former wife of Martin Harris. While married to Martin Harris, Lucy Harris once claimed to have a dream in which she said that she saw the gold plates. She thus offered Joseph Smith a gift of $28 to help finance the Book of Mormon translation. She was also involved in the lost 116 pages incident.

Harris's affidavit claims that her husband "was once industrious, attentive to his domestic concerns" and that he was once worth ten thousand dollars. She stated, "If he had labored as hard on his farm as he has to make Mormons, he might now be one of the wealthiest farmers in the country." She stated Harris's motivation for being associated with Mormonism was to make money.

She also accused her husband of beating her with a whip and implied that he was having an affair with a neighbor, Mrs. Haggard.

=== Letter from Charles Anthon ===
Howe includes a letter received from Charles Anthon on a visit made to him by Martin Harris. Harris showed him a copy of the characters, reported to have been copied from the gold plates. Anthon states that he initially viewed this as a hoax and later decided it was a scheme to cheat Harris out of his money. Anthon described the characters as "evidently copied after the Mexican Calender given by Humboldt, but copied in such a way as not to betray the source whence it was derived." Anthon requested that his letter be published immediately in case his name was mentioned again "by these wretched fanatics".

== Use of affidavits in modern works ==
The Howe/Hurlbut affidavits have continued over the years to provide a source of information for authors skeptical of the origins of the Book of Mormon and of the Latter Day Saint movement.

=== Anderson's 1990 Joseph Smith's New York Reputation Reexamined ===
Author Rodger I. Anderson, in his 1990 book Joseph Smith's New York Reputation Reexamined, supports the affidavits and contrasts the statements in them with statements made by Joseph Smith in his own published history. Anderson states that the affidavits "must be granted permanent status as primary documents relating to Joseph Smith's early life and the origins of Mormonism". LDS scholars respond that Anderson has "attempted to rescue the Hurlbut-Howe and other similar statements from the ravages of Mormon sophistry".

=== Vogel's 1998 Early Mormon Documents (Vol. 2) ===
Vogel presents the Hurlbut affidavits in Volume 2 of his compilation of early Mormon documents as the "Philastus Hurlbut Collection". Vogel cites Anderson's 1990 work as support for the validity of the documents.

=== Palmer's 2002 An Insider's View of Mormon Origins ===
According to LDS scholars, author Grant Palmer relied extensively upon the Hurlbut affidavits in his 2002 book An Insider's View of Mormon Origins for the purpose of "overlaying run-of-the-mill treasure lore" onto Joseph Smith's original account of the recovery of the golden plates.

=== Vogel's 2004 Joseph Smith: The Making of a Prophet ===
Author Dan Vogel repeatedly used the statements in the Hurlbut affidavits and Mormonism Unvailed in his 2004 biography Joseph Smith: The Making of a Prophet. (Note: The book Joseph Smith: The Making of a Prophet cites Mormonism Unvailed 56 times.) In that book, Vogel proposes that Joseph Smith created the Book of Mormon and founded a church to save his family from poverty. The statements contained in the affidavits are used as sources to support Vogel's assertion of the influence of treasure hunting on Smith's actions. LDS scholars respond that Vogel "fails to see how weak and vague these charges are" and point out that for the majority of the treasure hunting expeditions described, Smith is not even recorded as having been present. Furthermore, in an earlier collection of Mormon documents which he edited, Vogel opined, "the collection of affidavits gathered in 1833 by Doctor Philastus Hurlbut ... shed no light on Mormon origins."

== Spalding theory of Book of Mormon authorship ==
Hurlbut heard of an unpublished romance novel by author Solomon Spalding while he was touring Pennsylvania and lecturing against Mormonism. Hurlbut concluded that the description of the story in the manuscript bore some resemblance to that of the Book of Mormon.

Author Dan Vogel suggests that Hurlbut was not the originator of the theory, noting that Hurlbut pursued that in response to what he had heard about the manuscript and suggests that had Hurlbut been the inventor of the theory, "he would not have made strenuous efforts to recover Spalding's manuscript".

=== Statements from Spalding's neighbors and relatives ===
Eight of the affidavits acquired by Hurlbut from Spalding's neighbors stated that there were similarities between the story and the Book of Mormon.

An example is the statement of Solomon Spalding's brother John, which declared that Spalding's manuscript, referred to as Manuscript Found, "gave a detailed account of their journey from Jerusalem, by land and sea, till they arrived in America, under the command of NEPHI and LEHI. They afterwards had quarrels and contentions, and separated into two distinct nations, one of which he denominated Nephites and the other Lamanites." Martha Spalding, John's wife, tells a similar story, and states that "the names of Nephi and Lehi are yet fresh in my memory, as being the principal heroes of his tale".

Author Fawn Brodie expressed suspicion about the statements and claims that the style of the statements was too similar and displayed too much uniformity. Brodie claimed that Hurlbut did a "little judicious prompting".

=== Howe's response to Spalding manuscript ===
Howe concluded that Joseph Smith and Sidney Rigdon plagiarized a Spalding manuscript and produced the Book of Mormon to make money. Hurlbut obtained a manuscript from Spalding's widow and provided it to Howe in 1833 before the publication of Mormonism Unvailed. Howe could not find the alleged similarities with the Book of Mormon described in the statements and instead argued that there must be a second Spalding manuscript that was now lost. After the publication of Howe's book in 1834, the Spalding manuscript in his possession was either lost or suppressed.

=== Rejection of theory ===
In 1840, Benjamin Winchester, who personally knew Hurlbut, published a book rejecting the Spalding theory as "a sheer fabrication". Winchester attributed the creation of the entire story to Hurlbut.

In 1884, a Spalding manuscript, Manuscript Story — Conneaut Creek, was discovered and published. The manuscript is believed by some to bear no resemblance to the Book of Mormon story but is thought by others to contain parallels in theme and narrative.
