= Josiah Priest =

American writer (1788–1861)

Josiah Priest (1788–1861) was an American polemicist of the early 19th century. His books and pamphlets, which presented both standard and speculative history and archaeology sold in the thousands. Although Priest appears to have been poorly educated, he attempted to portray himself as an authority in his books. Priest is often identified as one of the creators of pseudoscientific and pseudohistoric literature. Although his work was widely read and several of his works were published in multiple editions, his books were characterized by theories that were used to justify the violent domination over both the Native American and African-American peoples. Priest's works were among the most overtly racist of his time. Priest's works help set the stage for the Trail of Tears and the defense of slavery that contributed to the conflicts of the American Civil War.

== Early life ==
Priest was born in Unadilla, New York. He grew up during a time when the United States was first establishing itself as a nation. Little specific is known about his schooling, but it is assumed that he received a basic primary and secondary education. At the age of 24 he married Eliza Perry from Lansingburgh, New York. After a brief period in Lansingburgh, they migrated to Albany, New York, around the year 1819. While there, Priest was first employed as a coach "trimmer" or upholsterer, He later worked in leather, mainly fashioning saddles and harnesses. He and Eliza conceived and raised a total of ten children. He was reportedly well-liked by the churchgoers for his dramatic performance during the sermons, several of which were published. Priest's fundamentalist view of Christianity and his faith in Biblical literalism are evident throughout his work. Josiah Priest knew Oliver Cowdery, who later assisted Joseph Smith, Jr., in the production of the Book of Mormon.

== Writing career ==
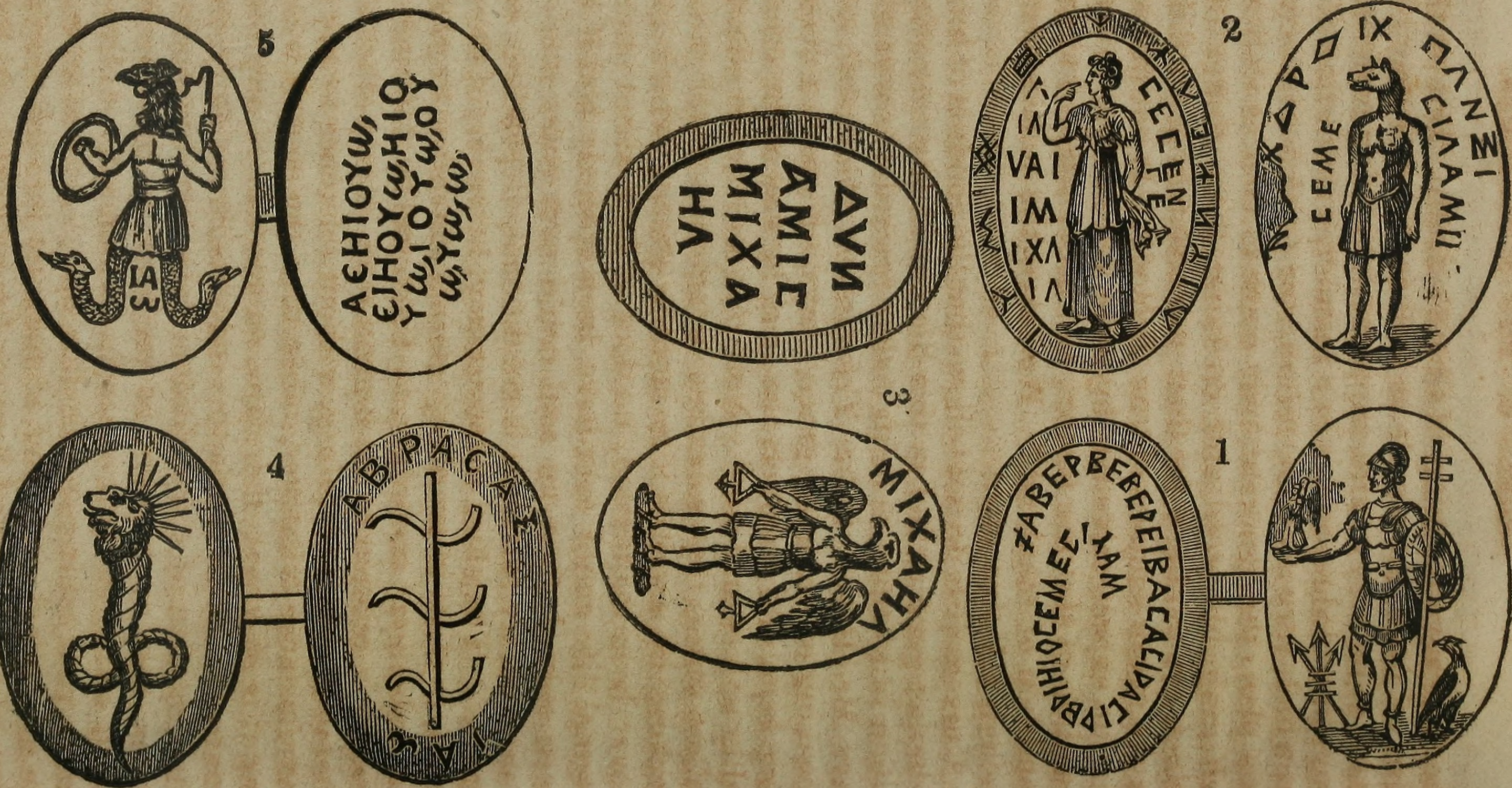
Illustration from Priests 1839 book The anti-universalist, or History of the fallen angels of the scriptures: Proofs of the being of satan and of evil spirits and many other curious matters connected therewith

Priest decided to give up his profession as a leather worker and become a writer. His first book, in a genre now identified as cryptozoology was The Wonders of Nature and Providence, Displayed, compiled from Authentic Sources, Both Ancient and Modern, Giving an Account of Various and Strange Phenomena Existing in Nature, of Travels, Adventures, Singular Providences, &c. (1826). His other major publications were American Antiquities and Discoveries of the West (1833) and Slavery, As It Relates to the Negro (1843), each of which was published in multiple editions.

His writing about American prehistory—and this comment is not made entirely to be humorous—might be classified as science fiction or fantasy as well as a subgenre of American Romanticism, the elements of which are pronounced in the early products of popular culture. Winthrop Hillyer Duncan writes, “This author is thought by some to have been the creator or forerunner of the popular dime and nickel novels of the sixties, seventies and eighties."

=== American Antiquities (1833) ===
This 400-page publication centered around Priest's own study of the Bible and antiquarian journals, supplemented by information from his travels. After visiting earthworks in Ohio and New York, Priest concluded that these mounds could be traced back to a lost race that had inhabited America even before the Native Americans. This idea is now referred to as the "mound builder myth" and still has supporters in society today. The book grew in popularity because of Priest's views on Native Americans. "It tapped into the widely accepted view of those times that Native Americans were merely bloodthirsty savages, bent on the destruction of all but their own race. It was inconceivable to Priest and like-minded men that a race so lazy and inept could conceive and build such huge, elaborate structures." Priest speculated that the original dwellers could be the Ten Lost Tribes of Israel. The reasoning Priest gives for his conclusion that there was an even earlier settler than the Native Americans relies upon his own Biblical interpretation of the flood story. According to Josiah, after the great flood disappeared, Noah and his ark landed on America. While surveying the land, Noah also discovered mounds that had been constructed before the waters rose up. Upon seeing this, Noah questioned where these agricultural phenomena came from. "Surveying the various themes of mound builder origins, he could not decide whether the mounds were the work of Polynesians, Egyptians, Greeks, Romans, Israelites, Scandinavians, Welsh, Scotts, or Chinese, although he felt certain the Indians had not built them."

Priest's clear bias against Native Americans probably derived from stories he heard during the American Indian Wars. Immediately following the American Revolution, Native Americans who were engaged in bloody and violent battles were frequently represented by the dominant culture as savages and threats to peace.

=== Slavery, As It Relates to the Negro (1843) ===
Another work in which Priest uses Biblical interpretation as a central theme is Slavery, As It Relates to the Negro, Or African Race (1843). In this overtly racist book, Priest seeks to use references from the Bible to prove that God created black people to be slaves. Priest claims that Noah's three sons were each a different color. The black offspring was named Ham, which Priest says was a word Egyptians used to identify objects that were black. He goes on to assert that Ham was cursed from birth to be a servant. As a consequence of his sins, all his people would also suffer the fate of slavery. Priest writes, "The appointment of this race of men to servitude and slavery, was a judicial act of God, or in other words was a divine judgment." Multiple revised editions of this book were republished in the 1850s under the title, Bible defence of slavery or, The origin, history, and fortunes of the Negro race.

Priest provides three pieces of evidence for why the Bible justifies the enslavement of black people. He says that the blacks were created with lower intelligence and more irrational behavior than other colors of man, suiting them as servants. He cites a verse in the Book of Genesis that states that Ham and all of his descendants were destined to be slaves. He argues that, due to the black's inferior attributes, they possessed a need to be enslaved. His book discusses how a black man's physical stature and skin, as opposed to those of a white man, are designed to be more durable and therefore intended for hard manual labor.

=== Pamphlets and historical profiles ===
In addition to his books, Priest wrote several pamphlets focusing on heroes of the American Revolution. His narratives suggest a preoccupation with racial conflicts, since they focus mainly on soldiers who had been held in captivity by Native Americans. This approach continued to find favor with some 20th-century American historians. For example, Frank H. Severance (1856–1931) gave a generally favorable opinion of Priest's work. While Priest was “not altogether trustworthy as a historian,” Severance argued that his work is based on “more or less authentic” sources including interviews of early pioneers whom Priest saw as heroic adventurers pitted against savages. According to Severance, Priest's best works were his “unpretentious pamphlets” that preserved a few accounts of specific experiences of individual white American pioneers that might otherwise have been forgotten.

== Criticisms and legacy ==
Critics dismiss Priest's books as compilations of poorly supported theories motivated by racism. Robert Silverberg notes, "The argument he constructs is built on literal interpretations of Biblical passages mixed with popular pseudo-scholarly views and gross misreadings of related texts." Priest argued that the descendants of Ham were cursed, but in the actual Biblical text, only Ham's son Canaan is cursed. This undercuts his argument that "Ham" meant "black" in Egyptian.

Priest was known for integrating many types of sources into his writings, seeking to create a semblance of authority and credibility for a popular audience. Priest's fantastic assertions persist today in the works of pseudoscience, pseudohistory, and New Age pop culture. In this respect, he can be considered a pioneer in popular but highly erroneous publishing. The popularity of his works allowed Americans of his time to indulge in romantic fantasies about the past that encouraged their own racism.

== Bibliography ==
- The wonders of nature and Providence, displayed, (1826) Google eBook.
- American antiquities and discoveries in the West, 3rd rev. ed. (1833) Open Library.
- American antiquities and discoveries in the West, (1835) Internet Archive.
- American antiquities and discoveries in the West, (1835) Google eBook.
- Bible defence of slavery and the origins, fortune, and history of the Negro race, as deduced from history, both sacred and profane, their natural relations--moral, mental, and physical--to the other races of mankind, compared and illustrated--their future destiny predicted, etc. (1851) Internet Archive.
- Bible defence of slavery and origins, fortune, and history of the Negro race, (1852) Google eBook.
