= Thomas Thorowgood =

Thomas Thorowgood (died c.1669), B.D., was a Puritan minister and preacher in King's Lynn, Norfolk, England. He was the first English author to argue in 1650 that American Indians were descended from the Lost Ten Tribes of the biblical ancient Israelites. This theory was an early 16th century Christian theory that was revived in popularity during the beginning of the English colonisation of North America in the 17th century.

== Treatise ==
In the English culture/language context, Thorowgood's treatise Ievves in America, or, Probabilities that the Americans are of that race. With the removal of some contrary reasonings, and earnest desires for effectuall endeavours to make them Christian, first published in 1650 under the encouragement of John Dury, appears to be the first suggestion of the "Jewish Indian" theory, which would later prove to have, in different forms, an enduring influence in the religious and cultural history of both England and the United States.

== Contact with the Puritan missionaries ==
Thorowgood was in contact with the Puritan missionary John Eliot who had emigrated from England to the Massachusetts Bay Colony in 1631. In accordance with the Puritan goal of converting the American Indians to the Christian faith, one of the strategies devised by the Puritan settlers was to view the Indians as being descended from the ancient Israelites through the Christian messianic/millenarian myth of the Lost Ten Tribes. Viewing the Indians in this religious light would make them more acceptable as human beings in general to the population of Puritan settlers, and with this purpose the book was then written and first published in London in 1650. The book was printed again in London in 1660 with a slightly modified title: Jews in America, or Probabilities that those Indians are Judaical, made more probable by some Additionals to the former Conjectures.

The book was published both times with an introduction by John Dury, and it contained also Dury's translation of Menasseh ben Israel's report of the story he had heard in Amsterdam in 1644 from the South American traveler Antonio de Montezinos, about the latter's encounters with people who seemed to follow some Israelite religious rites and customs in the northern part of the Andes mountain range (in modern-day Colombia; in the Montezinos document attached to the book the area is called "the Province of Quito"). It was the publication of the account and the book by Dury and Thorowgood in London in 1650 that pushed Menasseh ben Israel to publish his famous Spes Israelis in Latin and in Spanish in Amsterdam later on that same year. The English version of Menasseh's work called "The Hope of Israel", probably also translated from Latin into English by John Dury, was first published in London by Moses Wall in 1652.

Thorowgood's book/thesis was refuted still in 1651 by Sir Hamon L'Estrange, in his book entitled Americans no Jews, or improbabilities that the Americans are of that Race. For the staying power of Thorowgood's thesis and its influence on subsequent American historiography, a good example is the late 18th century work of the Indian historian James Adair.
