= Doctor Philastus Hurlbut =

Latter Day Saint dissenter

Doctor (Note: '"Doctor" was his given first name, not a title or honorific.) Philastus Hurlbut (February 3, 1809 – June 16, 1883) was a 19th-century Latter Day Saint dissenter. Hurlbut is best known for his collection of affidavits which in 1834 were published in Eber D. Howe’s anti-Mormon book Mormonism Unvailed [sic]. The purpose of these affidavits was to produce damaging evidence related to the character of Joseph Smith, the founder of the Latter Day Saint movement, Smith's family, and his associates.

== Life and work ==
Hurlbut was born in Chittenden County, Vermont. He was a Methodist preacher in Jamestown, New York, and joined Joseph Smith's Church of Christ sometime in 1832 or 1833. He was ordained as an elder of the church on March 18, 1833, by Sidney Rigdon.

In June 1833, Hurlbut was excommunicated from the church on charges of sexual immorality. A contemporary author discusses Hurlbut’s background by noting that prior to joining the Mormons, Hurlbut had been expelled from his Methodist congregation for "unvirtuous conduct with a young lady." As a member of the Latter Day Saint church, Hurlbut "immediately commenced his old practices, in attempting to seduce a young female.... [F]or this crime he was immediately expelled from the church." In response to his expulsion from the church, Hurlbut "now determined to demolish, as far as practicable, what he had once endeavoured to build up."

Hurlbut began travelling throughout the country, giving lectures against Mormonism.

At the request of an anti-Mormon Ohio committee, Hurlbut traveled to Palmyra, New York, where Smith had lived when Mormonism was developed and obtained affidavits from people who were familiar with the Smith family. His journey was done for the purpose of "collecting statements disparaging to the Smith name" and to "completely divest Joseph Smith of all claims to the character of an honest man, and place him at an immeasurable distance from the high station which he pretends to occupy."

One Presbyterian historian has speculated that the gathering of the affidavits was "revenge" by the three local Presbyterian leaders for a claim made by Joseph's mother, Lucy Mack Smith, that they had "conspired to destroy the Book of Mormon."

To accomplish his task, Hurlbut traveled in Ohio, New York, and Pennsylvania collecting statements disparaging to the Smith name.

When Hurlbut read the Spalding manuscript, he said, "I obtained a manuscript... which was reported to be the foundation of the Book of Mormon... when upon examination I found it to contain nothing of the kind, but being a manuscript upon an entirely different subject."

In 1834, Hurlbut was arrested for allegedly threatening Smith's life. A judge released him on his own recognizance and ordered him to keep the peace.

Hurlbut later moved to Gibsonburg, Ohio, where he joined a branch of the United Brethren Church and became an elder in 1846. In 1847, he became a member of the board of trustees of Otterbein College. He was excommunicated therefrom in 1851 on the charge of "having engaged in improprieties with the opposite sex." Hurlbut died in Gibsonburg.

== Sources ==
- Adams, Dale W. (2000). "Doctor Philastus Hurlbut: Originator of Derogatory Statements About Joseph Smith, Jr". The John Whitmer Historical Association Journal. 20: 76–93.
- Jessee, Dean C. (ed) (1989), The Papers of Joseph Smith: Autobiographical and Historical Writings (Vol. 1), vol. 1, Salt Lake City: Deseret Book
- Matzko, John (2007), "The Encounter of the Young Joseph Smith with Presbyterianism", Dialogue: A Journal of Mormon Thought, vol. 40, no. 3, pp. 68–84
- Winchester, Benjamin (1840), The origin of the Spaulding story, concerning the Manuscript Found; with a short biography of Dr. P. Hulbert, the originator of the same; and some testimony adduced, showing it to be a sheer fabrication, so far as in connection with the Book of Mormon is concerned. By B. Winchester, minister of the gospel, Philadelphia: Brown, Bicking & Guilbert, Printers
- Reynolds, George (1888), The myth of the "Manuscript found," or the absurdities of the "Spaulding Story", Salt Lake City: Juvenile Instructor Office
