= List of books in the style of the King James Version =

This is a list of books written in the style of the King James Bible (excluding translations of the Bible derived from the King James Version itself). Historian Eran Shalev has called this style of writing "pseudo-biblicism", but it is also known as "Scriptural Style", or the "Style of Ancient Antiquity". The style became popular in the 1740s (the first known example being a 1742 letter by Horace Walpole) and spread to British North America, ending in popularity in the first half of the 19th century.

== List ==
- The Chronicles of the Kings of England (1744) is a book on English history written by Robert Dodsley under the pen name "Nathan Ben Saddi".
- A Parable Against Persecution (1755) is a hoax text composed by Benjamin Franklin.
- The American Revolution: written in scriptural, or, ancient historical style (1796) is an account of the American Revolution written by Richard Snowden (1753–1825).
- The First Book of Napoleon (1809) is a history of Napoleon Bonaparte and the Napoleonic Wars written under the pen name "Eliakim the Scribe".
- The Late War between the United States and Great Britain (1816) is an educational text covering the War of 1812 written by Gilbert J. Hunt.
- The Chronicles of Eri (1822) is a collection of purported ancient Irish manuscripts which detail the history of Ireland, purportedly translated by Roger O'Connor.
- The Book of Nullification (1830) was an anonymous work written by "a spectator of the past", discussing American political figures.
- The Book of Mormon (1830) is a work that purports to be a pre-Columbian history of the Americas miraculously translated by Joseph Smith from golden plates. In Mormonism, a religious movement with 16 million members, the book is considered a sacred text.
- The Book of Abraham (1842), a work that purports to be written by Abraham and miraculously translated by Joseph Smith from Egyptian papyri. In Mormonism, the book is considered a sacred text.
- The Doctrine and Covenants (1835–43), a collection of revelations and other documents of Joseph Smith and other Latter Day Saint leaders. In Mormonism, the book is considered a sacred text.
- The Healing of the Nations (1854) is a work of American Spiritualism by Charles Linton, with endorsement from Nathaniel P. Tallmadge, former US Senator and Governor of Wisconsin.
