= James Adair (historian) =

Irish-American trader and historian (c. 1709–1783)

Memorial stone to James Adair

James Robert Adair (c. 1709 – 1783) was a native of County Antrim, Ireland, who went to North America and became a trader with the Native Americans of the Southeastern Woodlands.

== Life ==
Adair was born in Ireland c. 1709, later emigrating to South Carolina in 1735, where he traded deerskin with the Catawba and Cherokee. From 1735, Adair resided in North America for 40 years and was almost entirely cut off from the outside world. From 1744, he resided chiefly among the Chickasaw. In 1751, Adair moved to Laurens County, South Carolina.

In the 1740s, he led a British trade mission to the Eastern Choctaw tribe at the height of King George's War in an effort to win this nation over from French influence. He dealt extensively with Chief Red Shoes, the leader of the pro-British faction of the Choctaw. This eventually erupted into a fierce civil war amongst the Choctaw that led to Red Shoes' assassination in 1749. Adair went forward under the direction of South Carolina Governor James Glen but then vehemently blamed him for the mission's failure and the loss of his personal fortune.

In the 1760s, he led a contingent of Chickasaw warriors against the French in the French and Indian Wars which resulted in 1763 with most French territory east of the Mississippi being ceded over to the British colonies at the Treaty of Paris (1763).

== History of the American Indians ==
In 1775, stimulated by the encouragement of a few intimate friends, such as Sir William Johnson, 1st Baronet, Colonel George Croghan, George Galphin, and Lachlan McGillivray, Adair compiled his notes into the form of a book. He mentions a string of disadvantages under which he laboured, notably the jealousy, secrecy, and closeness of the natives, but he hoped to be able to correct the very superficial notions that prevailed as to their civilisation. His book was called The History of the American Indians . . . containing an Account of their Origin, Language, Manners, . . . and other Particulars, sufficient to render it A Complete Indian System . . . with A New Map of the Country.

The value of Adair's work as showing the relations between the natives and the English traders was recognised, and a German translation appeared at Breslau in 1782. It must be admitted that a very disproportionate space is given to the hypothesis that the American natives are descended from the lost ten tribes of Israel. Thomas Thorowgood, adopting an old idea of the Spanish Las Casas, had first maintained this theory in English in 1650 in his Jewes in America. Both Roger Williams and Jonathan Edwards seemed rather inclined to favour the view, which, as elaborately set forth by Adair, has since found champions in Elias Boudinot (Star in the West, 1816) and in Edward King, Viscount Kingsborough. Among the points of similarity between the Jews and natives, Adair emphasised the division into tribes, worship of a great spirit, Jehovah, notions of a theocracy, of ablutions and uncleanness, cities of refuge, and practices as regards divorce and raising seed to a deceased brother. The bias imparted by this theory to many of Adair's remarks led Volney to condemn the whole book in his Tableau du Climat et du Sol des Etats-Unis.

The second half of the book is more strictly An Account of the Katahba, Cheerake, Muskohge, Choktah, and Chikkasah Nations. Lord Kingsborough reprinted the whole of the first part of Adair's work in the eighth volume of his sumptuous Mexican Antiquities, with an appendix of notes and illustrations from inedited works by French and Spanish authors, 'affording the most satisfactory proofs of Adair's veracity in the minutest particulars.' Adair's map of Native American nations is partially reproduced in Winsor's History of America.

== Sources ==
- Who Was Who in America, Historical Volume, 1607-1896. Chicago: Marquis Who's Who, 1967.
