= View of the Hebrews =

1823 American book by Ethan Smith

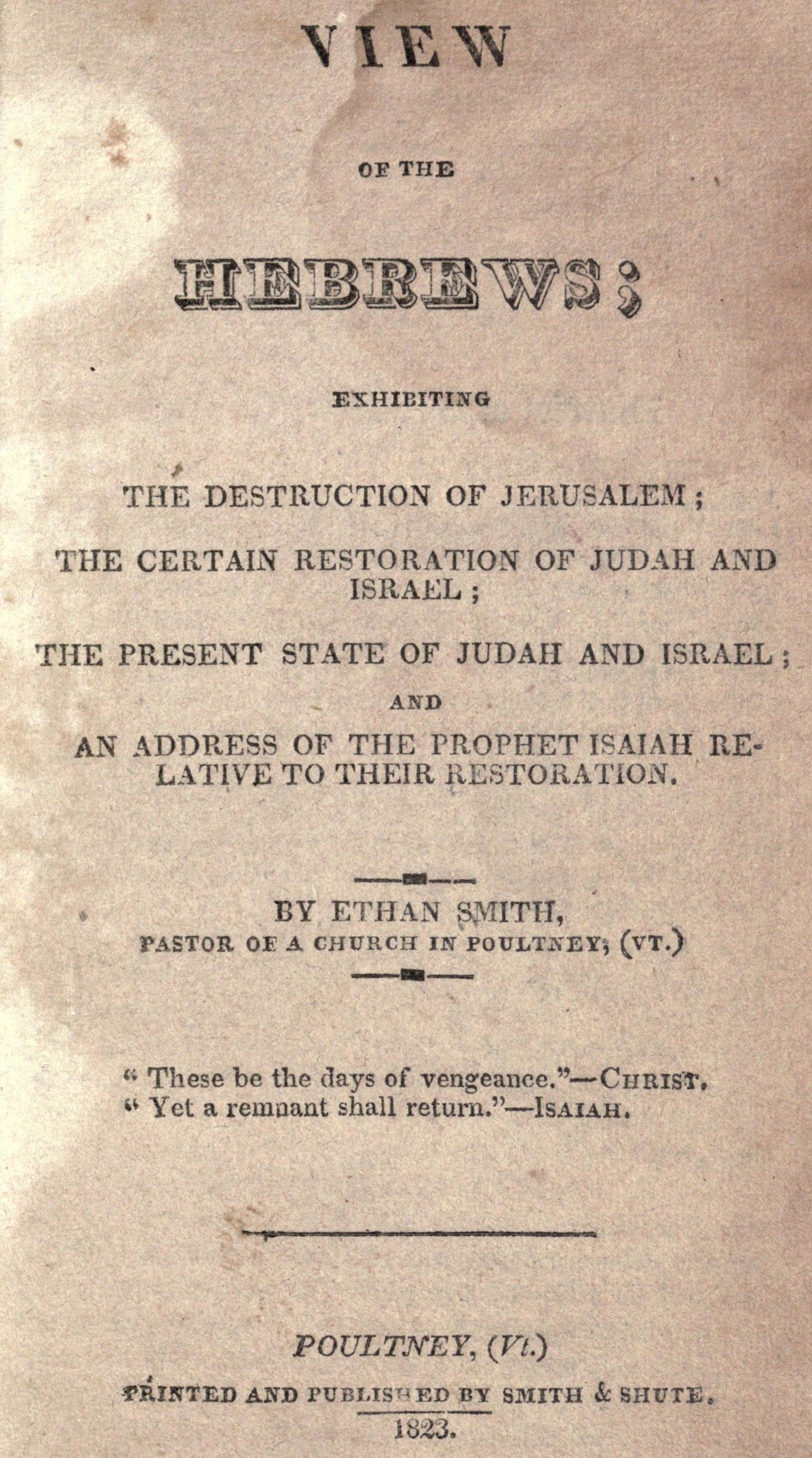
- Title page from the 1823 printing
- Author: Ethan Smith
- Original title: View of the Hebrews: Or the Tribes of Israel in America
- Language: English
- Publication date: 1823
- Publication place: United States
- Text: View of the Hebrews at Wikisource

View of the Hebrews is an 1823 book written by Ethan Smith, a Congregationalist minister in Vermont, who argued that Native Americans were descended from the Ten Lost Tribes of Israel, a relatively common view during the early nineteenth century. Numerous commentators on Mormon history, from LDS Church general authority B. H. Roberts to Fawn M. Brodie, biographer of Joseph Smith, have noted similarities in the content of View of the Hebrews and the Book of Mormon, which was first published in 1830, seven years after Ethan Smith's book.

== Content ==
Ethan Smith suggested that Native Americans were descendants of the Ten Lost Tribes of Israel; according to Mormon historian Richard Lyman Bushman, this theory was held by many theologians and laymen of his day who tried to fit new populations into what they understood of biblical history, which they felt to encompass the world. These tribes were believed to have disappeared after being taken captive by the Assyrians in the 8th century BCE. Mormon historian Terryl Givens calls the work "an inelegant blend of history, excerpts, exhortation, and theorizing."

During Smith's day, speculation about the Ten Lost Tribes was heightened both by a renewed interest in biblical prophecy and by the belief that the aboriginal peoples who had been swept aside by European settlers could not have been the same as the ancient people who created the sophisticated earthwork mounds found throughout the Mississippi Valley and southeastern North America. Smith attempted to rescue Indians from the contemporary myth of mound builders being a separate race by making the indigenous people "potential converts worthy of salvation." "If our natives be indeed from the tribes of Israel," Smith wrote, "American Christians may well feel, that one great object of their inheritance here, is, that they may have a primary agency in restoring those 'lost sheep of the house of Israel.'"

== Comparison with the Book of Mormon ==
The Book of Mormon shares some thematic elements with View of the Hebrews. Both books quote extensively from the Old Testament prophecies of the Book of Isaiah; describe the future gathering of Israel and restoration of the Ten Lost Tribes; propose the peopling of the New World from the Old (View of the Hebrews via land bridge, The Book of Mormon via ocean voyage); declare a religious motive for the migration; divide the migrants into civilized and uncivilized groups with long wars between them and the eventual destruction of the civilized by the uncivilized; assume that Native Americans were descended from Israelites and their languages from Hebrew; include a change of government from monarchy to republican; and suggest that the gospel was preached in ancient America.

Early Mormons occasionally cited the View of the Hebrews to support the authenticity of the Book of Mormon. In the early 20th century, Mormon historian B. H. Roberts noted the parallels between View of the Hebrews and the Book of Mormon and explored the possibility Joseph Smith had used View of the Hebrews as a source in composing the Book of Mormon, or that he was at least influenced by the popular 19th-century ideas expounded in the earlier work. It is unknown whether Joseph Smith had access to View of the Hebrews when he dictated the Book of Mormon in 1829 and 1830; he did quote from View of the Hebrews in 1842.

Oliver Cowdery, who later served as Joseph Smith's scribe for the Book of Mormon, lived in the same small Vermont town as Ethan Smith and may have attended the Congregational church where the latter was pastor for five years. Cowdery may have passed on knowledge of the book to Joseph Smith. Mormon apologists have argued that the parallels between the works are weak or over-emphasized. Larry Morris, a Mormon apologist, has argued that "the theory of an Ethan Smith–Cowdery association is not supported by the documents."

When in 1922 Mormon apologist B. H. Roberts was asked by church leaders to compare View of the Hebrews and the Book of Mormon, he produced a confidential report, later published as Studies of the Book of Mormon, that noted eighteen points of similarity.

Fawn M. Brodie, the first important historian to write a non-hagiographic biography of Joseph Smith, proposed that Joseph Smith's theory of the Hebraic origin of the American Indians came "chiefly" from View of the Hebrews. "It may never be proved that Joseph saw View of the Hebrews before writing the Book of Mormon," wrote Brodie in 1945, "but the striking parallelisms between the two books hardly leave a case for mere coincidence."

== Modern publication ==
A photographic reprint of the 1823 edition of View of the Hebrews was published by Arno Press in 1977. The text was published in 1980 by Jerald and Sandra Tanner, with an introduction by the latter. In 1985, a scholarly edition of the work was published by University of Illinois Press, and a second edition was published by Signature Books in 1992. Brigham Young University published an edition in 1996.

== See also ==
- Origin of the Book of Mormon
- Solomon Spalding

== Further references ==
- Dougherty, Matthew W. (2021). Lost Tribes Found: Israelite Indians and Religious Nationalism in Early America. University of Oklahoma Press. ISBN 9780806168883.
- Fenton, Elizabeth (2020). Old Canaan in a New World: Native Americans and the Lost Tribes of Israel. North American Religions. New York University Press. ISBN 9781479866366.
