= Eber D. Howe =

American journalist

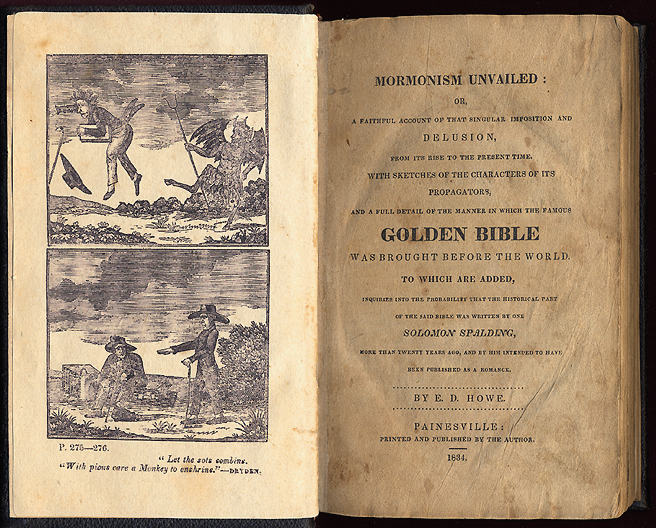
Frontispiece and title page from Mormonism Unvailed

Eber Dudley Howe (June 9, 1798 – November 10, 1885) was the founder and editor of the Painesville Telegraph, a newspaper that published in Painesville, Ohio, starting in 1822. Howe was the author of one of the first books that was critical of the spiritual claims of Joseph Smith Jr, founder of the Latter Day Saint movement. His 1834 book Mormonism Unvailed [sic] was based largely on affidavits collected by Latter Day Saint dissenter Doctor Philastus Hurlbut and on the letters of dissenter Ezra Booth, which in 1831 had been published in the Ohio Star.

== Life ==
Howe was born to Samuel William Howe and Mabel Dudley in Clifton Park, Saratoga County, New York. In 1804, the family moved to Ovid, New York and in 1811 relocated to Upper Canada, living a few miles west of Niagara Falls. During the War of 1812, Howe joined the U.S. Army in Batavia, New York. After the war, Howe became involved in the newspaper business, working at the Buffalo Gazette in Buffalo, New York, the Erie Gazette in Erie, Pennsylvania, and the Cleveland Herald in Cleveland, Ohio. In 1822, he moved to Painesville, Ohio and began publishing the Painesville Telegraph. Under Howe's editorship, the Telegraph had a strongly abolitionist editorial perspective. Howe's home was used as a station on the Underground Railroad, assisting fugitive slaves. The Eber Howe house and property, known as The House at Liberty Hollow, are maintained as a park. In June 1823, he married Sophia Hull of Clarence, Ohio.

While living in Painesville, Howe's wife, sister, and niece converted to Mormonism. On January 11, 1831, Howe wrote a letter to W. W. Phelps, a newspaper publisher in Canandaigua, New York, asking about the origins of the new religion. Phelps, who had read the Book of Mormon and met Joseph Smith, responded to Howe by writing that "we have nothing by which we can positively detect it as an imposition", but that "if it is false, it will fall, and if of God, God will sustain it." Phelps was baptized into the Latter Day Saint church a few months later. Howe continued to be interested in the Mormons, and in November 1834 he published Mormonism Unvailed, which he described as "a history of the Mormon imposition, from its rise to the present time, with many other peculiarities of the sect."

In January 1835, Howe sold the Painesville Telegraph to his younger brother for $600 (~$18,726 in 2025). After leaving the newspaper, Howe remained a publisher and a manufacturer of woollen goods.

Howe considered himself a skeptic on religious matters. However, after his wife died of stomach cancer in 1866, he became an avid believer in spiritualism.

== See also ==
- Abner Cole
