= Ethan Smith (clergyman) =

American Congregationalist clergyman (1762–1849)

Ethan Smith (December 19, 1762 – August 29, 1849) was a New England Congregationalist clergyman in the United States who wrote View of the Hebrews (1823), a book that argued that Native Americans were descended from the Ten Lost Tribes of Israel. His position was not uncommon among religious scholars, who based their history on the Bible.

Historians including Fawn McKay Brodie, a 20th-century biographer of Joseph Smith, founder of the Church of Jesus Christ of Latter-day Saints, suggest that View influenced the Book of Mormon (1830), because of the strong "parallelisms" found between the two.

== Early life and education ==
Born in 1762 into a pious home in Belchertown, Massachusetts, Smith abandoned religion following the early deaths of his parents. After a prolonged inner struggle, he joined the Congregational Church in 1781, and shortly thereafter began training for the ministry. He graduated from Dartmouth College in 1790, though finding "but little of the spirit of religion there."

Smith served congregations for several years at a time in New Hampshire, Vermont, and Massachusetts. He accepted an appointment as "City Missionary" in Boston. He also served as a supply pastor for vacant pulpits. "He was a warm friend of what he accounted pure revivals of religion; though he was careful to distinguish the precious from the vile" in matters of religious experience. Smith enjoyed a "robust constitution and vigorous health" and continued to preach until within two weeks of his death.

At eighty Smith's sight "became very dim, and he was no longer able to read, though he never became totally blind. So familiar was he with the Bible and Watts, that it was his uniform custom to open the book in the pulpit, and give out the chapter and hymn, and seem to read them; and he very rarely made a mistake, to awaken a suspicion that he was repeating from memory." Ethan Smith died in Boylston, Massachusetts, in 1849. The house in which he was born, dated to 1728 in Town records and said to have been erected by his grandfather John Smith, remains standing immediately southwest of Dwight, in Belchertown, at 84 Old Bay Road.

Smith wrote several books about the Bible and theology:

- A Dissertation on the Prophecies (1809),
- A Key to the Figurative Language of the Prophecies (1814),
- A View of the Trinity, designed as an answer to Noah Webster's Bible News (1821), *Memoirs of Mrs. Abigail Bailey,
- View of the Hebrews (1823),
- Four Lectures on the Subjects and Mode of Baptism,
- A Key to the Revelation (1833), and
- Prophetic Catechism to Lead to the Study of the Prophetic Scriptures (1839).

== View of the Hebrews and Mormonism ==
In View of the Hebrews (1823), Smith argued that Native Americans were descended from the Ten Lost Tribes of Israel. Some striking parallels have been noted between his work and the Book of Mormon (1830), which Joseph Smith (no relation) claimed to have received by revelation.

When writing View of the Hebrews, Smith lived in Poultney, Vermont, a town with a population less than 2,000. Living there at the same time was Oliver Cowdery, who later served as Joseph Smith's scribe for the Book of Mormon. From 1821 to 1826, Ethan Smith was also pastor of the Congregational church that Cowdery may have attended with his family. Larry Morris, an LDS scholar, has argued that "the theory of an Ethan Smith-Cowdery association is not supported by the documents and that it is unknown whether Oliver knew of or read View of the Hebrews." In her biography of Joseph Smith, Fawn Brodie wrote, "It may never be proved that Joseph saw View of the Hebrews before writing the Book of Mormon, but the striking parallelisms between the two books hardly leave a case for mere coincidence."

== Resources ==
A VIEW OF THE HEBREWS EXHIBITING THE DESTRUCTION OF JERUSALEM; THE CERTAIN RESTORATION OF JUDAH AND ISRAEL; THE PRESENT FATE OF JUDAH AND ISRAEL; AND AN ADDRESS OF THE PROPHET ISAIAH RELATIVE TO THEIR RESTORATION. Poultney, NY, 1823. First edition.
