= Mormonism in the 19th century =

In the late 1820s, Joseph Smith, founder of the Latter Day Saint movement, announced that an angel had given him a set of golden plates engraved with a chronicle of ancient American peoples, which he had a unique gift to translate. In 1830, he published the resulting narratives as the Book of Mormon and founded the Church of Christ in western New York, claiming it to be a restoration of early Christianity.

Moving the church to Kirtland, Ohio in 1831, Smith attracted hundreds of converts, who were called Latter Day Saints. He sent some to Jackson County, Missouri to establish a city of Zion. In 1833, Missouri settlers expelled the Saints from Zion, and Smith's paramilitary expedition to recover the land was unsuccessful. Fleeing an arrest warrant in the aftermath of a Kirtland financial crisis, Smith joined his remaining followers in Far West, Missouri, but tensions escalated into violent conflicts with the old Missouri settlers. Believing the Saints to be in insurrection, the Missouri governor ordered their expulsion from Missouri, and Smith was imprisoned on capital charges.

After escaping state custody in 1839, Smith directed the conversion of a swampland into Nauvoo, Illinois, where he became both mayor and commander of a nearly autonomous militia. In 1843, he announced his candidacy for President of the United States. The following year, after the Nauvoo Expositor criticized his power and such new doctrines as plural marriage, Smith and the Nauvoo city council ordered the newspaper's destruction as a nuisance. In a futile attempt to check public outrage, Smith first declared martial law, then surrendered to the governor of Illinois. He was killed by a mob while awaiting trial in Carthage, Illinois.

After the death of the Smiths, a succession crisis occurred in the Latter Day Saint movement. Hyrum Smith, the Assistant President of the Church, was intended to succeed Joseph as President of the Church, but because he was killed with his brother, the proper succession procedure became unclear. Initially, the primary contenders to succeed Joseph Smith were Brigham Young, Sidney Rigdon, and James Strang. Young, president of the Quorum of the Twelve, claimed authority was handed by Smith to the Quorum of the Twelve. Rigdon was the senior surviving member of the First Presidency, a body that led the church since 1832. At the time of the Smiths' deaths, Rigdon was estranged from Smith due to differences in doctrinal beliefs. Strang claimed that Smith designated him as the successor in a letter that was received by Strang a week before Smith's death. Later, others came to believe that Smith's son, Joseph Smith III, was the rightful successor under the doctrine of Lineal succession.

Several schisms resulted, with each claimant attracting followers. The majority of Latter Day Saints followed Young; these adherents later emigrated to Utah Territory and continued as the Church of Jesus Christ of Latter-day Saints (LDS Church). Rigdon's followers were known as Rigdonites, some of which later established The Church of Jesus Christ. Strang's followers established the Church of Jesus Christ of Latter Day Saints (Strangite). In the 1860s, those who felt that Smith should have been succeeded by Joseph Smith III established the Reorganized Church of Jesus Christ of Latter Day Saints, which later changed its name to Community of Christ.

Under Brigham Young, the LDS Church orchestrated a massive overland migration of Latter-day Saint pioneers to Utah, by wagon train and, briefly, by handcart. The Apostles directed missionary preaching in Europe and the United States, gaining more converts who then gathered to frontier Utah. In its remote settlement, the church governed civil affairs and made public its practice of plural marriage (polygamy). As the federal government asserted greater control over Utah, relations with the Mormons enflamed, leading to the Utah War and the Mountain Meadows Massacre. Mormon polygamy became a major political issue, with federal legislation and judicial rulings curtailing Mormon legal protections and delegitimizing the church. Eventually, the church issued a manifesto discontinuing polygamy, which paved the way to Utah statehood and realignment with mainstream American society.

== 17th Century ==
- Joseph Smith's earliest confirmed paternal ancestor Robert Smith is born. He was possibly born in 1626. He is first recorded in 1638 in Boston, Massachusetts, as an indentured servant. DNA shows Joseph Smith was Irish. The ancestry of the Smith family before then is uncertain, but DNA testing suggests Irish or Scottish roots.

== 18th Century ==
- Jason Mack, Joseph Smith's great uncle, and brother of Solomon Mack sets up a religious community in Canada.

=== 1730s ===
- Solomon Mack, grandfather of Joseph Smith, is born.

=== 1750s ===
- Solomon Mack takes part in the French and Indian War.

=== 1770s ===
- Solomon Mack takes part in the American Revolutionary War, the separatist rebellion against British rule.

=== 1790s ===
==== 1791 ====
- Smith's aunt Lovisa Mack Tuttle, after a two-year illness, is miraculously healed. Returning from a near death experience, she tells of a vision in which Jesus spoke through a veil and told her to "warn the people to prepare for death" and to "declare faithfully unto them their accountability before God".

==== 1796 ====
- January 24: Smith's parents Joseph Smith Sr. and Lucy Mack Smith are married in Tunbridge, Vermont, by Seth Austin.
- Smith's grandfather Asael Smith states in a letter that "I believe that the stone is now cut out of the mountain without hands, spoken by Daniel, and has smitten the image upon his feet."

==== 1797 ====
- Joseph Sr. and Lucy Smith have an unnamed baby child, who dies. There is disagreement on whether this was a boy or a girl.
- December 6: Joseph Sr., his father Asael, his brother Jesse, and fourteen others form a Universalist Society.

==== 1798 ====
- February 11: Smith's brother Alvin Smith is born in Tunbridge, Vermont.

==== 1799 ====
- April 10: Smith's grandfather Asael Smith writes a letter to his family, intended to be read after his death, articulating his belief in universal salvation, warning them not to look to outward formalities of religion. Asael Smith, however, was a pew holder of the local Congregational church, a church known at the time for having preachers who taught Christian Universalism and Unitarian theology.

== 1800s ==
=== 1800 ===
- February 9: Smith's brother Hyrum Smith is born in Tunbridge, Vermont.
- August 4 – May 4, 1801: The Smith family may not have been counted during the 1800 U.S. census. Although there are "Joseph Smith" families in both Tunbridge and Poultney, Vermont, neither of them match in ages and children with the family of Joseph and Lucy Smith.
- 1800–02: Smith Sr. may have moved temporarily to or visited Poultney, Vermont, 50 miles from Tunbridge, according to residents who said he lived there "at the time of the Wood movement here".
- spring or early summer: A counterfeiter named (Justus?) Winchell organizes a dowsing company to dig for money in Middletown and Rutland, Vermont. Winchell associates with Nathaniel Wood, who had founded the New Israelites some years earlier, whose religious elements included temple building, divination, polygamy, and the idea that they were literal descendants of the Israelites. Among the company is Warren Cowdery Jr., the father of Oliver Cowdery, the dowser who became Smith's scribe in 1829. According to interviews conducted by a local historian, Joseph Smith Sr. was also part of the New Israelites, and was one of its "leading rods-men." There is no historical consensus linking Smith Sr. to the New Israelites; however, James C. Brewster reported that Smith claimed that his money digging career began during this decade or earlier.

=== 1802 ===
- January 14: The New Israelites, having prophesied this day as the end of the world, are confronted by local militia. This is known as the "Wood Scrape". The militia fires their weapons to disperse the "Fraternity of Rodsmen".
- about spring: Joseph Sr. and Lucy Smith rent out their farm in Tunbridge, Vermont, and move to the more urban Randolph, Vermont, to set up a merchant shop. They operate with $1,800 in goods on credit from merchants in Boston.
- Soon after moving to Randolph, Smith Sr. speculates on a shipment of ginseng, which he sends from the port in New York City to China.
- about fall or winter: Six months after moving to Randolph, Lucy contracts tuberculosis.
- 1802–03: While deathly ill, Lucy has a religious conversion after she believes she hears the voice of God. She said that she perceived her "mind at one time raising gradually, borne away to Heaven above all hight [sic] then reverting back again to my babes and my Companion at my side", after which she promised God that if she would live, she would try to find religion, and then heard a voice saying "Seek and ye shall find knock and it shall be opened unto you let your heart be comforted ye believe in God believe [sic] also in me". Lucy tries to find a religious home, but is unhappy with several ministers; therefore, she concludes that "there is not on Earth the religion which I seek I must again turn to my bible taking Jesus and his deciples [sic] for an ensample".

=== 1803 ===
- A large Christian revival sweeps across Vermont and Connecticut.
- about 1803: After the ship returns from China with the proceeds from the sale of Smith Sr.'s ginseng (a round trip that might have taken about a year), the earnings are stolen by a Royalton merchant who flees to Canada.
- Joseph Sr. and Lucy Smith move from Royalton back to Tunbridge, Vermont.
- The Smiths must sell their farm in Tunbridge to cover their debts to Boston merchants, and they thereafter become poor tenants.
- May 17: Smith's sister Sophronia is born in Tunbridge.
- 1803–04: Lucy attends meetings at a Methodist church, and Smith Sr. "went a few times to gratify [Lucy] for he had so little faith in the doctrines taught by them that my feelings were the only inducement for him to go".
- 1803–04: Hearing that Joseph Sr. is attending Methodist meetings, Smith's Universalist grandfather Asael Smith appears at his door, throws Thomas Paine's Age of Reason, into the house, and angrily demands that Smith Sr. read it until he believes it. He also suggests that Smith Sr. ought not let Lucy attend the meetings. As a result, the Smiths stop attending Methodist church meetings.
- 1803–04: Lucy Mack Smith visits a grove near Tunbridge to pray about her husband's rejection of organized religion. When she returns home and goes to sleep that night, she has a vision that Smith Sr. would eventually accept the "pure and undefiled Gospel of the Son of God."

=== 1804 ===
- about 1804: The Smiths move from Tunbridge to Royalton, Vermont, where they "resided a few months".
- August 27: Smith's maternal grandfather Solomon Mack purchases property in Sharon, Vermont.
- 1804–05: Joseph Sr. and Lucy move to Sharon, Vermont, where they rent the farm of Lucy's father while Joseph Sr. cultivates crops in the summer and teaches school in the winter. Solomon Mack likely lives with them.

=== 1805 ===
- December 23: Smith is born in Sharon, Vermont, to Joseph Smith Sr. and Lucy Mack Smith. Vermont residents recall that Smith Sr. told them the young Joseph was born with a caul (a sign of good luck), and that Smith Sr. "intended to procure a stone for [him] to see all over the world with".

=== 1806 ===
- May 3: Smith Sr. witnesses a land transaction between his in-laws Solomon Mack and Daniel G. Mack in Sharon, Vermont.

=== 1807 ===
- April 1: In the court of Windsor County, Vermont, a person is convicted of passing counterfeit money to "Joseph Smith".
- April 16: A second person is convicted of passing counterfeit money to "Joseph Smith".
- Sharon resident George Downer is convicted of passing two counterfeit bills the previous spring. There is some tenuous evidence, based in part on a descendant of the counterfeiter against whom Smith Sr. testified on April 1, that Smith Sr. was an accomplice in that case who avoided conviction by turning state's evidence.
- Smith family moves from Sharon back to Tunbridge, Vermont.
- October 15: Smith Sr., his brother Jesse, and other Tunbridge residents petition the Vermont legislature for an exemption from providing their own military equipment as members of the Vermont militia.

=== 1808 ===
- March 13: Smith's brother Samuel is born in Tunbridge, Vermont.
- 1808–10: Smith family moves from Tunbridge to Royalton, Vermont.
- 1808–10: Smith possibly attends school on Dewey Hill, taught by Deacon John Rinney, although he may have been too young.

== 1810s ==
=== 1810 ===
- March 13: Smith's brother Ephraim is born in Royalton, Vermont.
- March 24: Ephraim Smith dies.
- winter of 1810–11: A Christian revival occurs in the towns around Royalton, Vermont. Smith Sr. becomes "much excited upon the subject of religion" and "contended" for a restoration of primitive Christianity.

=== 1811 ===
- spring 1811: Smith's maternal grandfather Solomon Mack, after being ill all winter in Sharon, Vermont, and after searching the scriptures and praying, sees a vision and later hears a voice. He is converted to evangelical Calvinism and denounces Universalism.
- March 13: Smith's brother William is born in Royalton, Vermont.
- April: Joseph Smith Sr. tells his family about his first vision. He sees a field representing the barrenness of true religion upon the earth, and he sees a log containing a box. His spirit guide tells him that if he eats the contents of the box, he will be filled with "wisdom and understanding". He raises the lid of the box, but is unable to eat its contents because "all manner of beasts, horned cattle, and roaring animals, rose up on every side in the most threatening manner possible". Based on the vision, Smith Sr. concludes, more than ever, that there is no true religion on the earth. He would have six other visions between 1811 and 1819.
- after May 11: After selling his property in Sharon, Vermont, and moving to live with Smith's uncle Daniel in Royalton, Smith's maternal grandfather Solomon Mack self-publishes a booklet describing his heavenly visions and voices of the previous winter: Mack, Solomon (1811), A Narraitve [sic] of the Life of Solomon Mack, Windsor: Solomon Mack.

=== 1812 ===
- after May: Smith family moves from Royalton, Vermont, to Lebanon, New Hampshire.
- after May: Joseph Smith Sr. has his second vision, in which he saw a barren field representing the desolate world, a "narrow path", a stream with a rope running along its bank leading to a beautiful tree bearing a fruit whiter than snow that was "delicious beyond description. While eating, he thought "I cannot eat this alone, I must bring my wife and children, that they may partake with me." Thus, he brought his family to eat the fruit. However, there was a "spacious building" across the valley where the tree was, filed with finely-dressed people looking down and mocking Smith's family. Smith's spirit guide said that the fruit represented "the pure love of Christ". The guide said that the spacious building represented "Babylon, and it must fall".
- winter of 1812–13: Smith and his siblings contract typhoid fever, and Smith acquires osteomyelitis in his leg. He has surgery to remove infected bone, causing him to hobble on crutches at least until 1816.

=== 1813 ===
- about 1813: Smith stays with his uncle Jesse Smith in Salem, Massachusetts while recovering from his leg operation.
- July 8: Smith's sister Katherine is born in Lebanon, New Hampshire.

=== 1815 ===
- by May: Smith family moves to Norwich, Vermont, and their first year of crops fails. They survive by selling fruit.

=== 1816 ===
- March 15: The Smith family is "warned out of town" in Norwich, Vermont.
- Joseph Smith Sr. relates to his family his third vision, in which he was lame, but his spirit guide sent him through a garden amidst 12 wooden images of giants. After each of the wooden giants sequentially bowed toward him in obeisance, he was healed.
- March 25: Smith's brother Don Carlos is born.
- Summer: New England and other areas experience a climate abnormality known as the Year Without a Summer.
- 1816–17: Palmyra experiences a large Christian revival.
- Fall: Smith Sr. moves to the village of Palmyra, New York.

=== 1817 ===
- January: Lucy Mack Smith and the remainder of the family move to Palmyra, where they live in a small house on Main Street.
- abt. 1817: Smith Sr. opens a "cake and beer shop" in Palmyra, selling "gingerbread, pies, boiled eggs, root-beer, and other like notions of traffic", and peddles these on the street from a handcart during Independence Day celebrations and military training days". (Tucker 1867, p. 12). A journalist who visited the area in 1831 wrote in his notes that Smith Sr. "was a vender—made gingerbread and buttermints &c&c". He said, "In this article [gingerbread? ginger?] he was a considerable speculator, having on hand during a fall of price no less than two baskets full.... What their dividends were I could not learn, but they used considerable molasses, and were against the duty on that article".
- abt. 1817: Influenced by the Christian revivals of 1816–17 (Bushman 2005, p. 37), Smith later recalls, "At about the age of twelve years my mind become [sic] seriously imprest with regard to the all importent [sic] concerns for the wellfare [sic] of my immortal Soul which led me to searching the scriptures believeing [sic] as I was taught, that they contained the word of God thus applying myself to them and my intimate acquaintance with those of different denominations led me to marvel excedingly [sic] for I discovered that they did not ~~adorn~~ instead of adorning their profession by a holy walk and Godly conversation agreeable to what I found contained in that sacred depository."
- 1817–19: In Palmyra, Smith Sr. and his oldest sons take occasional day jobs, such as gardening, harvesting, and well-digging, to supplement their income. Lucy Mack Smith sets up a business selling painted oil-cloth coverings.
- April: Joseph Smith Sr. is listed on the local road list as living in Palmyra village, on Road District 26.
- 1817–21: During some period between these years, Smith visits the office of the Palmyra Register weekly and buys a news paper for his father.
- December: A "Joseph Smith" (Sr.?) joins the Masonic lodge in nearby Canandaigua, New York.

=== 1818 ===
- April: Joseph Smith Sr. family is living in Palmyra village.
- May: Joseph Smith Sr. relates to his family his sixth vision. Smith Sr. rushes toward a meetinghouse where multitudes of other people are entering, but just as he arrives there, the door shuts before him. The porter tells him that he must be barred entry to satisfy justice. After praying for forgiveness of sins, the mercy of Jesus satisfied the needs of justice and he was allowed entrance.

=== 1819 ===
- April: Joseph Smith Sr. family is listed on tax records as still living in Palmyra village.
- The Smith family builds a log home in the town of Palmyra, away from the village and adjacent to the border of Manchester. Smith (1853, p. 71) said they moved into the log home two years after arriving in Palmyra. Turner (1852, p. 214) remembers the Smiths occupying this log home in the winter of 1819-20. Tucker (1876, pp. 12–13) dates the move to the log home to 1818, said that the Smiths occupied the land as squatters, and described the log home as "divided into two rooms, on the ground-floor, and had a low garret, in two apartments. A bedroom wing, built of sawed slabs, was afterward added". They may have begun clearing trees and farming nearby land they did not yet own, or they may have been renting the land.
- 1819–1820s: While on their new property, the Smiths engage in "chopping and retailing of cord-wood, the raising and bartering of small crops of agricultural products and garden vegetables, the manufacture and sale of black-ash baskets and birch brooms, the making of maple sugar and molasses in the season for that work, and in the continued business of peddling cake and beer in the village on days of public doings". They also engage in hunting and fishing, trapping muskrats, and digging out groundhogs from their holes, and spending time at Palmyra shops.
- 1819–1820s: Smith Jr. works as a clerk for the peddling of cake and beer on public occasions, and sometimes is duped into accepting counterfeit coins from other youth.
- Alvin Smith leaves home to raise money for the family.
- An unknown shooter hides under a wagon, and when Smith approaches his home, the shooter fires across the path, missing Smith but lodging a bullet in a cow.
- Joseph Smith Sr. tells his family about his seventh and last vision, telling him that he lacked one thing in order to secure his salvation. His spirit guide wrote what that one thing was on a piece of paper, but Smith Sr. awoke before he could read it.
- September: According to Tucker (1876, p. 19), Smith discovers a seer stone, which is white and opaque, and resembles a child's foot. Tucker's account apparently conflates the story of finding this stone with the better-documented story of Smith finding his brown seer stone in 1822. Vogel (1994, p. 202 n.11) argues that this 1819 date cannot be relied upon, and that it is not established that Smith began using a seer stone for treasure digging until 1822.

== 1820s ==
- between 1820 and 1827: According to Tucker (1867, pp. 24–25), Smith sees the location of a buried chest of money, but says that a black sheep must be sacrificed in order to break the spell on it. He obtains the sheep from Manchester resident William Stafford and makes the sacrifice within a circle at the site of the dig. After three hours of digging, one of the party accidentally breaks the enchantment by breaking silence and causes the excavation to fail.

=== 1820 ===
- about 1820: According to one account, Smith finds his first stone by borrowing the stone of another treasure seer.
- about 1820: According to Tucker (1867, p. 20), Smith is paid 75 cents to locate a stolen roll of cloth with his seer stone. He sends the owner on a three mile trip to look for the cloth, but it is never found.
- about 1820: During this period are the earliest reports of the Smiths conducting treasure quests in the Palmyra/Manchester area. Howe (1833, pp. 237, 240, 251, 268) date this earliest digging to 1820. See also Vogel 1994, p. 201 (dating the first digs to 1820 and suggesting the first digs occurred on their Manchester land). In Arrington (1970, 4-5 (online ed.)), James Gordon Bennett says, without giving a definite year, that "the Smith's [sic] and their associates commenced digging, in the numerous hills which diversify the face of the country in the town of Manchester. The sensible country people paid slight attention to them at first.... They Would occasionally conceal their purposes, and at other times reveal them by such snatches as might excite curiosity. They dug these holes by day, and at night talked and dreamed over the counties' riches they should enjoy, if they could only hit upon an iron chest full of dollars. In excavating the grounds, they began taking up the green sod in the form of a circle of six feed diameter—then would continue to dig to the depth of ten, twenty, and sometimes thirty feet."
- April: Smith family is listed on local records as living at the end of Stafford Road in Palmyra Township (i.e., their log home at the border adjacent to Manchester). Alvin Smith is listed as living in Palmyra village.
- Spring: According to Tucker (1876, pp. 21–22), Smith uses his seer stone to locate buried treasure near the Smiths' property, and gathers contributions from Palmyra residents for an excavation, which is conducted "at the dead hour of night". After "preparatory mystic ceremonies", digging begins in absolute silence in order not to break the "enchantment". When the chest of money is nearly within reach, one of the party accidentally speaks, thus causing the treasure to vanish. Vogel (1994, pp. 201–202) dates this treasure quest to after 1822, arguing that Smith did not obtain his first stone until that year.
- spring: According to Smith's later accounts, he has his First Vision. He sees God the Father and his Son Jesus Christ. In the vision, God testifies of Jesus, and then Jesus proceeds to tell Joseph that his sins are forgiven, and that he should join none of the churches, because none of them have the fullness of His Gospel.
- August Solomon Mack dies.

=== 1821 ===
- July: The Smith family obtains a mortgage on a 100-acre (0.4 km^{2}) farm adjacent to their log home, just outside Palmyra in what was then Farmington. (In 1821, this would become the town of Manchester.) They had already been working this land, either squatting or renting from the owner. Tucker (1867, p. 13) said that Smith made a small payment "to bind the bargain".
- July 18: Smith's youngest sister Lucy is born.

=== 1822 ===
- about January 25: Smith begins participating in a Palmyra "juvenile debating club" at "the old red school house on Durfee street".
- Alvin begins construction on a frame house for the Smiths.
- February–August: Smith takes an interest in Methodism. Turner (1852, p. 214) says that Smith "catch[es] a spark of Methodism in the camp meeting, away down in the woods, on the Vienna road", and is known there as "a very passable exhorter" at evening Methodist meetings. Tucker (1867, p. 18) says that Smith "joined the probationary class of the Methodist church in Palmyra, and made some active demonstrations of engagedness". According to Turner, this date must be after Smith's participation in the debating club (i.e., after Jan. 25, 1822). Date must also be after 7 July 1821, when the Methodists acquired their property in the woods off Vienna Road (Marquardt & Walters 1994, p. 54 n.41) The Methodists did not begin building their meetinghouse on Vienna Road until 19 June 1822 (Marquardt & Walters 1994, p. 54 n.41), but may have held camp meetings there while waiting for the building. It also must be on or before the summer of 1822, when Turner left the Palmyra area (Marquardt & Walters 1994, p. 55). Morgan (1986, p. 224) dates this to the revivals of 1824-25, but does not acknowledge that Turner said he left the Palmyra area in the summer of 1822.
- February–August: Smith withdraws from his Methodist probationary class. Mather (1880, p. 199) says that Smith "arose and announced that his mission was to restore the true priesthood. He appointed a number of meetings, but no one seemed inclined to follow him as the leader of a new religion." Tucker (1867, p. 18) says that Smith's "assumed convictions were insufficiently grounded or abiding to carry him along to the saving point of conversion, and he soon withdrew from the class. The final conclusion announced by him was, that all sectarianism was fallicious, all the churches on a false foundation, and the Bible a fable."
- Smith finds the black seer stone from a neighbor and locates his own seer stone in a well, at a depth of 22 feet. The digging occurred on the property of Clark Chase, whose son Willard disputed Smith's ownership of the stone. This would be the stone he used for later money digging and translation of the Book of Mormon.
- 1822-23?: The Smiths seek the expertise of a reputed treasure seer living many miles away. Several sources identify this seer as Luman Walter. In Arrington (1970, 5 (online ed.)), reprinting an 1831 article by James Gordon Bennett, Bennett describes this great seer as having "a particular felicity in finding out the spots of ground where money is hid and riches obtained. [Some anonymous member of the treasure quest party] related long stories how this person had been along shore in the east—how he had much experience in money digging—how he dreamt of the very spots where it could be found". He said that the Smiths worked for a time "to scrape together a little 'change' sufficient to fetch on the money dreamer." Bennett believed this distant magician was Sidney Rigdon, based on discussion with Palmyra residents who thought Rigdon was the author of the Book of Mormon. However, the story parallels a story told by Abner Cole in the Palmyra Reflector on 12 June 1830 (see below), which says the distant magician was Luman Walter, an occultist from Sodus, New York who had been educated in Europe.
- 1822-23: Smith Sr. participates in treasure digging under the direction of scryer Luman Walter, with at least one dig on the property of Palmyra journalist Abner Cole, according to Quinn (1998, p. 117). Vogel (1994, pp. 206–07) states that Cole's property was "Manchester lot 2". Cole lost this property some time after 19 August 1824, after which Benjamin Tabor owned it. Enoch Saunders rented from at least Tabor, and was renting at the time this excavation occurred.
- about 1822-24?: Luman Walter assists or conducts digs on the hill Cumorah. According to one Palmyra resident, Walter conducts three digs on the hill Cumorah, after having no success, he suggests that Smith Jr. might be the only one that could find treasure there. (Quinn 1998, p. 117). Arrington (1970, 5-6 (online ed.)) relates a story reported by James Gordon Bennett that "About the time that this person [the scryer from far away, which Bennett identifies as Sidney Rigdon but could be Walter] appeared among them, a splendid excavation was begun in a long narrow hill, between Manchester and Palmyra. This hill has been called by some, the Golden Bible Hill.... In the face of this hill, the money diggers renewed their work with fresh ardour, [the scryer/Rigdon] partly uniting with them in their operations." Bennett dates this story to about the time of the Palmyra's large religious revival of 1824-25. (Arrington 1970, 6 (online ed.)). Tucker (1867, p. 34) says that on the summit of Cumorah is a "yet partially visible pit where the money speculators had previously dug for another kind of treasure".

=== 1823 ===
- July–December: Ethan Smith, an anti-Masonic congregationalist minister in Poultney, Vermont, (and pastor of Oliver Cowdery's family) publishes View of the Hebrews from the press of the Poultney Gazette. The book concludes, based on reports of a parchment book, metal artifacts, and plates found in Indian burial mounds, that the American Indian peoples were the Ten Lost Tribes.
- September 21–22: According to his later accounts, Smith says he had three visions, and one again in the morning, of an angel, who showed him the location of a buried golden book engraved with a history of the Indians.
- September 22: Smith tells his father about his visions of the angel, and visits the hill Cumorah where the angel said the plates were buried. He returns empty-handed, claiming that he had failed to strictly follow the angel's commandments. He says the angel required him to return in exactly one year with his brother Alvin.
- September 23: Smith tells the rest of his family about the visions and his visit to Cumorah.
- September–November: Every night, the Smith family gathers to hear Smith tell stories of the "ancient inhabitants of this continent, [including] their dress, mode of traveling, and the animals upon which they rode; their cities, their buildings, with every particular; their mode of warfare; and also their religious worship" (Smith 1853, p. 84).
- October 23: The Wayne Sentinel, to which the Smith family subscribed, recounts a vision of Asa Wild, who said that "every denomination of professing christians had become exceedingly corrupt", including the Presbyterians and Methodists, of which he had been a member. Therefore, prior to the Millennium, which would arrive in seven years (i.e., 1830), there would be a restoration of primitive Christianity. God was in the process of "raising up" a class of people "signified by the Angel mentioned by the Revelator, XIV. 6, 7, which flew in the midst of heaven" who would preach the true gospel. These people "are of an inferior class, and small learning", and "they will be rejected by every denomination as a body; but soon, God will open their way, by miracles, judgments, &c."
- November 15: Alvin contracts "bilious cholic", and a physician administers a toxic amount of calomel. Five physicians are unable to get him to expel the poison.
- November 19: Alvin dies. On his death bed, he encourages Smith to "do everything that lies in your power" to obtain the golden plates.
- November 20: Smith pays a $3.00 fee at the Palmyra drug store.

=== 1824 ===
- May 12: Local interest in fortune telling is sufficiently high that a Palmyra newspaper advertises two occult handbooks: The Complete Fortune Teller, and The Book of Fate.
- May 17: A new land agent, John Greenwood, receives power of attorney over the Smith property.
- September 22: According to his later accounts, Smith visits Cumorah and returns empty handed because he was unable to bring Alvin (or possibly one of Alvin's body parts). The angel requires him to return in exactly one year with the "right person"; Smith was to know that person by looking in his seer stone. Vogel dispues the idea of annual visits as a later tale
- September 25: The Smith family hears rumors that Alvin's grave had been exhumed and dissected (possibly by the young Joseph Smith). To prove this was untrue, Joseph Smith Sr. has Alvin's body exhumed in the presence of witnesses.
- September 29: Joseph Smith Sr. runs an advertisement in the Wayne Sentinel for six weeks, announcing that he had exhumed Alvin's body, and that it was undisturbed. It also runs 6, 13, 20, 27 October and 3 November.
- Fall 1824 - Spring 1825: The Palmyra area experiences a large Christian revival of Baptists and Presbyterians, and Lucy, Sophronia, Hyrum, and Samuel become Presbyterians. Smith discourages them from attending, preferring solitary study of the Bible.
- Fall 1824 - Spring 1825: According to James Gordon Bennett, during the Palmyra revivals, Smith first began "turning their digging concern into a religious plot." Subscribing to the Spalding–Rigdon theory of Book of Mormon authorship, Bennett states that the idea for this shift was Sidney Rigdon's.

=== 1825 ===
- The Smiths are unable to raise money for their final mortgage payment, and their creditor forecloses on the property. However, the family is able to persuade a local Quaker, Lemuel Durfee, to buy the farm and rent the Smiths the property.
- September 22: Smith visits Cumorah and returns empty handed. Prior to this date, Smith had selected Samuel T. Lawrence as the "right person", and either Smith changed his mind and visited Cumorah alone, or brought Lawrence to the hill but the angel failed to appear.
- October 11: A speech by M. M. Noah, a Jewish rabbi and editor of the New York Enquirer is reprinted in The Wayne Sentinel of Palmyra, summarizing the many parallels found in other literature between the American Indians and the Jews.
- October–November: The frame house begun by Alvin in 1822 is finally completed and the family moves in. Tucker (1867, p. 13) says this house is partly enclosed, and never completed, and that the Smiths used the original log home as a barn.
- October: Smith is approached by Josiah Stowell, from South Bainbridge, New York, who had been searching for a lost Spanish mine near Harmony Township, Susquehanna County, Pennsylvania (now Oakland), and needed a treasure seer.
- October: Smith and his father travel to Harmony hoping to raise money to pay off their Manchester farm.
- November 1: Smith, Sr, Smith Jr., and seven others sign a contract for a money digging company in Harmony Township, Susquehanna County, Pennsylvania.
- November: The money digging company stays at the home of Isaac Hale, father of Smith's future wife Emma Hale.
- November 17: The money digging company disbands.
- November 1825 - March 1826: Although the money digging company has disbanded, Smith continues to work for Josiah Stowell, and attends school. Smith uses two stones to search for treasure and prays for help in the endeavor.
- December: Because the Smiths are delinquent on their mortgage, land agent John Greenwood sells the Smith farm to a group of three men. The new owners give the Smiths until 15 December for Hyrum to raise $1,000.
- December 20: A local Quaker named Lemuel Durfee Sr. buys the farm and allows the Smiths to rent the property until spring 1828, in exchange for labor by Samuel.

=== 1826 ===
- March 20: Smith is the subject of judicial proceedings in South Bainbridge, New York before Justice Albert Neely. He is charged with being a "disorderly person", because he was a "glass looker". According to witnesses, he was either convicted but allowed to escape, or discharged for lack of evidence. Smith states that by looking at the stone he can discover hidden treasures, gold mines, coined money, and lost property.
- August 11: Joseph Smith Sr. is listed among delinquent subscribers of The Wayne Sentinel published by E. B. Grandin.
- September 22: Smith visits Cumorah without the "right person". The angel tells him that the next annual visit on 22 September 1827 is his last chance to obtain the golden plates. The angel tells Smith that he must be married in order to obtain the plates.
- Fall: Smith looks into his seer stone and determines that Emma Hale, whom he had met previously, is the "right person" with whom he must go to Cumorah in 1827 to successfully obtain the golden plates.
- November 2: Smith's brother Hyrum marries Jerusha Barden.
- November: Josiah Stowell can no longer afford to continue searching for buried treasure, and Smith travels to Colesville, New York for a few months to work for Joseph Knight Sr. Smith directs further excavations on Knight's property and at other locations around Colesville.
- December: William Morgan's exposé of Masonic rituals is published in Batavia, New York: Morgan, William (1826), Illustrations of Masonry by One of the Fraternity Who has devoted Thirty Years to the Subject, Batavia, N.Y.: David C. Miller. (See 11 September 1826.)

=== 1827 ===
18 January
Smith elopes with Emma Hale in South Bainbridge, New York and they are married by judge "Squire Tarbill" (Zachariah Tarbell). (Anderson 2001, chronology).
January
Josiah Stowell moves Smith and his bride to Manchester. (Marquardt & Walters 1994, p. xxix).
10 March
Smith receives a receipt for credit of $4.00 on the account of Abraham Fish, who is known to have financed some of Smith's treasure expeditions. (Marquardt & Walters 1994, pp. xxix, 64, 67).
23 March
The Wayne Sentinel, the Palmyra newspaper published by E. B. Grandin, quotes the Rochester Daily Advertizer in arguing: "The excitement respecting Morgan, instead of decreasing, spreads its influence and acquires [sic] new vigour daily....The Freemason...[is] proscribed, as unworthy of 'any office in town, county, state, or United States!' and the institution of masonry,...is held up as DANGEROUS and detrimental to the interests of the country!".
16 April
Smith's brother Samuel begins a seven-month term of work for Lemuel Durfee, owner of the Smith Family Farm, in exchange for tenancy.(Anderson 2001, chronology). (Marquardt & Walters 1994, p. xxix).
1 June
The Wayne Sentinel runs a story of a German scholar working in the Vatican Library who said he had found evidence that the Mexicans and Egyptians were in communication in ancient times, and that there were examples in Mexico of biblical texts written in two different Egyptian dialects.
June
Smith Sr. tells fellow treasure seeker Willard Chase that several years ago, a spirit had appeared to Smith and told him about a golden book. (Marquardt & Walters 1994, p. xxix).
June - June 1828
Hyrum Smith is listed during this term as a member of the Palmyra Mount Moriah Masonic Lodge No. 112. (Marquardt 2005, p. 116).
Summer
According to Tucker (1867, p. 28), a "mysterious stranger" appears at the Smith residence and meets privately with Smith Jr., possibly multiple times.
August
Smith and his wife Emma visit Harmony to retrieve Emma's possessions. (Anderson 2001, chronology). Peter Ingersoll moves Emma's furniture from Harmony to Manchester. Smith tells his father-in-law Isaac Hale that he will give up glass-looking. (Marquardt & Walters 1994, p. xxix).
August
Smith works two days mowing for landlord Lemuel Durfee Sr. (Marquardt & Walters 1994, p. xxx).
fall
Tucker (1867, p. 30) states that stories that Smith was about to recover the golden plates were given "wide circulation". Tucker dates the stories of the First Vision and Smith's subsequent angel Moroni visions to this time period, arguing they are retrospective inventions (pp. 28, 33).
about fall
According to Tucker (1867, p. 31), Smith approaches Willard Chase, a carpenter, and asks him to make him a strong chest to hold the golden plates. In lieu of payment, Smith offers to give Chase a share in the profits generated by the plates.
20 September
Josiah Stowell and Joseph Knight Sr. arrive in Manchester in anticipation of Smith obtaining the golden plates. (Anderson 2001, chronology; Marquardt & Walters 1994, p. xxx).
22 September
After the stroke of midnight, Smith takes a wagon to visit Cumorah with his wife Emma, and retrieves the golden plates while she prays. (Anderson 2001, chronology). Smith says he hid the plates in a fallen tree top at Cumorah. With the plates, he says he found a sword, a breastplate, and a set of spectacles, telling Joseph Knight that with them, "I can see anything". (Marquardt & Walters 1994, p. xxx).
late September
Smith travels to nearby Macedon, New York to work for Mrs. Wells. (Marquardt & Walters 1994, p. xxx).
September–October
Alone, Smith visits Cumorah and returns with something heavy wrapped in a frock, which he places in a chest. Willard Chase claims that Smith admits that if it had not been for the brown stone found on the Chase property years earlier, he would not have found the plates. (Marquardt & Walters 1994, p. xxx). Chase believes that because the stone is his, Chase has at least part ownership of the plates.
September–October
After the original chest said to hold the plates is smashed by members of Smith's former money digging company, Smith obtains a "glass box" (a wooden box used to hold pieces of glass) and says that the plates are kept inside.
October
The family of Martin Harris, a wealthy Palmyra resident, hears about the golden plates from Lucy Mack Smith. Martin's wife and daughter visit the Smith home to investigate, and Harris conducts his own investigation, asking Smith how the book was found. Smith says that he had located the plates via his brown seer stone, and that an angel appeared to him and told him that it was God's work, and that Smith must quit the money-digging company, translate the plates, and publish the translation. Harris offers, "If the Lord will show me that it is his work, you can have all the money you want." (Marquardt & Walters 1994, pp. xxx–xxxi).
fall
According to Tucker (1867, pp. 30–31), Smith tells Palmyra residents that when he first saw the golden plates, he saw a "display of celestial pyrotechnics", as the angel appeared as his "guide and protector", while "ten thousand devils gathered there, with their menacing sulphureous [sic] flame and smoke, to deter him from his purpose!"
fall
Harris is said to have mused around the village of Palmyra about "what wonderful discoveries Jo Smith had made, and of his finding plates in a hill in the town of Manchester (three miles south of Palmyra), —also found with the plates a large pair of "spectacles," by putting which on his nose and looking at the plates, the spectacles turned the hieroglyphics into good English." (Gilbert 1892).
fall
According to Tucker (1867, pp. 32–33), Palmyra residents were not generally aware at this time of the spectacles Smith said were found with the plates.
fall
According to Tucker (1867, p. 31), "notorious wags" William T. Hussey and Azel Vandruver visit the Smith home and say they are willing to view the golden plates, taking upon themselves the risk that they would be being struck dead if they saw them. They observe something "concealed under a piece of thick canvas". After Hussey removes the canvas and sees a tile brick, Smith claims to have pulled a joke on the men, and "with the customary whiskey hospitalities, the affair ended in good-nature".
November–December
Harris gives Smith $50, which allows him to get out of debt and move to Harmony, Pennsylvania. Emma's brother Alva comes from Harmony to pick up the couple.
December
Smith and his wife leave Manchester and move to Harmony, Pennsylvania (now Oakland), where they live with Emma's parents. (Anderson 2001, chronology). During transit, the glass box said to contain the plates is hidden in a barrel of beans. (Marquardt & Walters 1994, p. xxxi).
30 December
Smith's sister Sophronia marries Calvin Stoddard in Palmyra. Smith is apparently absent. (Anderson 2001, chronology).

=== 1828 ===
December 1827-February 1828
Working behind a curtain, Smith transcribes some of the characters he says are engraved on the golden plates, and hands them across the curtain to Emma and her brother Reuben Hale. Smith also attempts to translate some of the characters.
February
Hyrum Smith and Martin Harris travel to Harmony to see Smith.
February - March
Martin Harris takes a transcript of characters and some of their translations to several scholars in New York City. According to Tucker (1867, p. 43), these scholars include "Hon. Luther Bradish, Dr. Mitchell, Professor Anthon, and others". James Gordon Bennett later reported that Harris told a potential financer in 1830 that he first approached "one of the Professors of Columbia College" (Anthon), who told Harris that he "could not decipher them", but referred him to Samuel L. Mitchill, who "looked at his engravings—made a learned dissertation on them—compared them with the hieroglyphics discovered by Champollion in Egypt—and set them down as the language of a people formerly in existence in the East, but now no more". (Arrington 1970, p. 8 (online ver.)). Harris said that after speaking with Mitchill, he returned to Anthon, "who put some questions to him and got angry with Harris". According to Gilbert (1892), Harris returns to Palmyra after his meetings in New York City and tells residents that Smith is a "little smarter than Professor Anthon." According to Tucker (1867, p. 45), Harris declared "in a boastful spirit that God had enabled him, an unlearned man as he was, to 'confound worldly wisdom'".
12 April
Harris begins acting as Smith's scribe while Smith begins dictating a translation of the golden plates, which Smith calls the Book of Lehi.
14 June
Harris persuades Smith to allow him to take the original, uncopied 116 manuscript pages to Palmyra to show his skeptical wife and family.
15 June
Smith and his wife have their first child, named Alvin, who dies soon after birth. Emma nearly dies, and hovers near death for days.
June–July
According to Tucker (1867, p. 46), Lucy Harris took the 116 manuscript pages from Martin Harris while he was sleeping, and burned them. Tucker said that she kept this "a profound secret to herself, even until after the book was published".
abt. 7 July
Smith visits Manchester to find out what happened to Harris, and learns that Harris has lost the 116 manuscript pages. Smith says the plates and the Urim and Thummim (Latter Day Saints) are taken away.
July
Smith returns to Harmony.
July
In Harmony, Smith dictates his first known written revelation, chastising him for losing the manuscript translation, and noting that "this is the reason that thou has lost thy privileges for a season, for thou hast suffered the counsel of thy director to be trampled upon from the beginning." Bushman (2005, p. 68) and Marquardt & Walters (1994, p. xxxi) describe this as Smith's first known written revelation. The identity of the speaker is unknown, because this revelation, unlike most later ones, refers to God and Jesus in the third person, although a hint to his identity may perhaps be found in his reference to "my people, the Nephites". Bushman (2005, p. 69) refers to the speaker as a "messenger". The revelation indicates that the "very purpose" of the golden plates is to ensure the Lamanites know about the Nephites, and "come to the knowledge of their fathers, and...that they may believe the gospel and rely upon the merits of Jesus Christ".
September
Lucy, Hyrum, and Samuel Smith stop attending the Presbyterian church in Palmyra.
22 September
On this, the anniversary of Smith's Cumorah visits, Smith begins translating again, using his seer stone. Smith begins translating where he left off, now known as the Book of Mosiah.
September 1828 to March 1829
Samuel, Emma, and her brother Reuben Hale serve as Smith's scribes. Translation is sporadic because Smith has to work to support his family, and very little gets translated until April 1829.
October
Cowdery takes a job teaching school in Manchester. He boards with the Smiths in Manchester.
aft. 22 September 1828
Smith Sr. and Lucy visit Smith Jr. and Emma at Harmony and meet the Hales.

=== 1829 ===
February
Joseph Smith Sr. and Lucy Mack Smith travel to Harmony. Smith dictates a revelation calling the elder Smith to take part in a "marvelous work". The revelation refers to God in the third person.
March
Martin Harris becomes skeptical about the golden plates, and asks Smith to let him see them. Smith dictates a revelation for Harris. Unlike prior revelations, this one refers to God in the first person. It also says that Smith had "entered into a covenant" with God not to show the plates to anyone unless God commands otherwise. It says that Smith "has a gift to translate the book, and I have commanded him that he shall pretend to no other gift, for I will grant him no other gift". While future generations would have access to the plates, in the present generation, the words of the book would go out with the testimony of the Three Witnesses who would have "power, that they may behold and view [the plates] as they are, and to none else will I grant this power, to receive this same testimony among this generation." For the first time, a Smith revelation specifically refers to the restoration of a church: "[I]f the people of this generation harden not their hearts, I will work a reformation among them, and I will put down all lyings, and deceivings, and priestcrafts, and envyings, and strifes, and idolatries, and sorceries, and all manner of iniquities, and I will establish my church, like unto the church which was taught by my disciples in the days of old." The revelation says that Harris could be one of the three witnesses if he humbles himself. However, if he sees the plates, Harris is commanded to say nothing more than "I have seen them, and they have been shown unto me by the power of God". Because of a conspiracy to destroy Smith, he is commanded to translate a few more pages, and then "stop for a season, even until I command thee again".
March
Harris returns to Palmyra.
5 April
Oliver Cowdery, a school teacher and dowser, arrives in Harmony with Samuel.
7 April
Cowdery begins acting as Smith's scribe while translating the golden plates.
April
Smith dictates a revelation calling Cowdery to assist with a "marvelous work", and referring to the "cause of Zion". The revelation refers to Cowdery's "gift" (dowsing) and instructs Cowdery to "exercise thy gift, that thou mayest find out mysteries." He is only to reveal his gift to "those which are of thy faith". The revelation refers to "records which contain much of my gospel, which have been kept back because of the wickedness of the people." Cowdery is to use his "gift" to assist in bringing these records to light. Both Cowdery and Smith are given the "keys" to this gift, so that "in the mouth of two or three witnesses shall every word be established".
April
Smith dictates what is characterized as a translation of a parchment written by John the Apostle and "hid up by himself". The revelation says that John will "tarry" on the earth until the Second Coming.
April
Smith dictates a revelation referring to Cowdery's two "gifts". The first gift is Cowdery's ability to "receive a knowledge concerning the engravings of old records, which are ancient". The second gift is "working with the rod" (dowsing). The revelation says "there is no other power save God, that can cause this rod of nature, to work in your hands, for it is the work of God". Cowdery is commanded to "[a]sk that you may know the mysteries of God, and that you may translate all those ancient records, which have been hid up...."
April
Cowdery begins to translate (perhaps by dowsing), then returns to acting as Smith's scribe. Smith dictates a revelation indicating that God took away his gift to translate for the time being because he was not persistent, and misunderstood the nature of translation, which requires the translator to "study it out in your mind". After the golden plates were translated, the revelation says, Cowdery could assist with translating "other records".
abt. April
Smith dictates a portion of the golden plates telling a story of Alma the Elder, who baptized his followers by immersion, "having authority from the Almighty God", and called his community of believers the "church of God, or the church of Christ". (Mosiah 18:13–17). The book described the clergy in Alma's church as consisting of priests, who were unpaid and were to "preach nothing save it were repentance and faith in the Lord". (Mosiah 18:20). Alma later established many churches, which were considered "one church" because "there was nothing preached in all the churches except it were repentance and faith in God." (Mosiah 25:22). In addition to priests, the clergy of these churches included teachers (Mosiah 25:21) and elders. (Alma 4:7).
about May
Smith dictates part of his translation (Third Nephi chapter 11) describing the exact mode of baptism by immersion, including the exact words to use. According to Oliver Cowdery's later reminiscence, "after writing the account given of the Savior's ministry to the remnant of the seed of Jacob, upon this continent, it was easily to be seen . . . that . . . none had authority from God to administer the ordinances of the Gospel."
15 May
Smith and Cowdery baptize each other. Years later, details gradually emerged concerning a vision prior to this baptism: In 1832, Smith's unpublished history indicated that the priesthood had been received by the "ministering of angels". In an 1834 publication, Cowdery first told the story of receiving the Aaronic priesthood on this date via a vision of John the Baptist, and then of Smith and Cowdery baptizing each other. Smith essentially agreed with Cowdery's account of the vision.
May
As the translation proceeds, Smith dictates a revelation claiming that the lost 116 manuscript pages still exist, and that the people who possess them have altered them and are waiting for Smith to re-translate the same material. Then, these people plan to argue that Smith cannot translate the same material twice, and thus Smith has only "pretended to translate". Thus, the revelation directs Smith not to re-translate the Book of Lehi. The revelation indicates that the originally-translated Book of Lehi had indicated that it was just an "abridgment" of the "plates of Nephi". Thus, Smith is directed to translate the "plates of Nephi", containing a "more particular account" of the material Smith had already translated. Smith is only to translate the "first part" of these "plates of Nephi", however, continuing down to the reign of King Benjamin, which Smith had already translated from the abridgment. The revelation also speaks of "establishing my gospel that there may not be so much contention". It defined the church of Christ as follows: "whoso repenteth, and cometh unto me, the same is my church: whosoever declareth more or less than this, the same is not of me, but is against me: therefore, he is not of my church".
May
Smith dictates a revelation calling his brother Hyrum to assist in a "marvelous work", but he is not yet called to preach, but he is to be patient, meanwhile praying that he can assist in "the translation of my work". The revelation says that Hyrum "hast a gift, or thou shalt have a gift", and refers to "that which you [Hyrum] are translating".
May
Smith dictates a revelation calling Joseph Knight to assist in a "marvelous work".
1 June
Smith moves to Fayette, New York and continues translation at the home of Peter Whitmer Sr.
early June
Smith dictates a revelation calling David Whitmer to assist with the "marvelous work". Whitmer is told that if he asks with faith he "may stand as a witness of the things of which [he] shall both hear and see".
early June
Smith dictates a revelation calling John Whitmer to assist with the "marvelous work". Whitmer becomes one of Smith's scribes.
early June
Smith dictates a revelation calling Peter Whitmer Sr. to assist with the "marvelous work".
early June
Smith and Cowdery begin baptizing new converts in Seneca Lake, including Hyrum Smith, David Whitmer, and Peter Whitmer Jr.
early June
Years later, after 1839, Smith recalls that he and others gathered in the "chamber of Mr. Whitmer's house", where they heard a voice commanding them to ordain elders, but they refrained from doing so until the organization of the church.
between June 1 and 14
Smith dictates a revelation directed to Oliver Cowdery and David Whitmer, referring to Smith's previous baptism of Cowdery (presumably on May 15) and instructing Cowdery to "build up my church". Both Cowdery and Whitmer are called to "cry repentance unto this people" and to "search out" the identities of the twelve disciples whom God had called and given power to baptize and to ordain priests and teachers. Cowdery and Whitmer will know the identities of these twelve "by their desires and their works".
11 June
Using a title page that Smith says was written by Moroni, Smith obtains a copyright for the Book of Mormon (the name of his translation of the golden plates).
first half of June
Smith sends Martin Harris with a copy of the Book of Mormon title page and a few pages of translation to Palmyra to see if E. B. Grandin, owner of The Wayne Sentinel, will agree to publish it. Harris meets with Grandin twice, and the second time threatens that if Grandin does not publish it, they will publish it in Rochester, New York. Grandin provides an approximate estimate of costs, but declines to publish the book.
about June?
Smith directly or indirectly approaches Thurlow Weed, a well-known anti-Masonic publisher and activist in Rochester, New York about printing the Book of Mormon. Weed refuses.
about June?
Smith attempts unsuccessfully to secure the financial assistance for publishing the Book of Mormon from several family acquaintances including George Crane (a Quaker).
June
Smith begins dictating a replacement section for the Book of Lehi, beginning with the First Book of Nephi.
14 June
Oliver Cowdery sends a letter to Hyrum Smith referencing language from the "twelve disciples" revelation.
abt. June or later
Oliver Cowdery receives a revelation called the Articles of the Church of Christ, about "how he should build up his church & the manner thereof". it discusses the ordination of priest and teachers, and calls members to meet regularly to partake of bread and wine. Cowdery is described as "an Apostle of Christ". The revelation contains language found in the "twelve disciples" and "three witnesses" revelations.
June
Smith dictated the following text from the Second Book of Nephi (found at Smith (1830, p. 110)): "Wherefore, at that day when the book shall be delivered unto the man of whom I have spoken, the book shall be hid from the eyes of the world, that the eyes of none shall behold it, save it be that three witnesses shall behold it, by the power of God, besides him to whom the book shall be delivered; and they shall testify to the truth of the book, and the things therein. And there is none other which shall view it, save it be a few, according to the will of God..." According to information added in 1852 to the History of the Church (but absent in the 1842 Times and Seasons publication of the same material), this passage initiated the idea of showing the plates to three witnesses. There is a similar passage in the Book of Ether, and that passage might have been the spark (as proposed by several later editions of History of the Church). It is not known whether the Book of Ether was translated before or after the Second Book of Nephi.
second half of June
Smith dictates a revelation to Oliver Cowdery, David Whitmer, and Martin Harris that if they have faith, they may be the Three Witnesses to the Book of Mormon, as well as the sword of Laban, the Urim and Thummim, and the Liahona.
second half of June
Oliver Cowdery, David Whitmer, and Martin Harris become the first Three Witnesses, other than Smith, of the golden plates by seeing them in a vision in Fayette.
19 June?
Eight Witnesses, Christian Whitmer, Jacob Whitmer, Peter Whitmer Jr., John Whitmer, Hiram Page, Joseph Smith Sr., Hyrum Smith, and Samuel H. Smith, visit a grove near the Smith family home in Manchester (Anderson 2001, pp. 455–56) and have an experience described in a later "Testimony of Eight Witnesses" published as part of the 1830 Book of Mormon. The statement says, with regard to the golden plates, that they "did handle with our hands and we also saw the engravings thereon, all of which has the appearance of ancient work and of curious workmanship." There are differing opinions on whether the witnesses believe they had seen the plates in vision, or with their natural eyes. Lucy Mack Smith says that the plates had been carried by this grove by "one of the ancient Nephites." The June 19 date is suggested because Lucy Mack Smith said the event occurred on a Thursday, and that the following Monday, the company went to visit E.B. Grandin to see if he will publish the Book of Mormon.
22 June?
According to Lucy Mack Smith, the company from Fayette who had been among the Eight Witnesses "went to Palmyra to make arrangements for getting the book printed; and they succeeded in making a contract with one E. B. Grandin, but did not draw the writings at that time." The June 19 date is suggested because Lucy Mack Smith said the event occurred on a Monday of the week prior to the Thursday on which the demonstration to the Eight Witnesses occurred.
23 June?
According to Lucy Mack Smith, the company from Fayette "returned home, excepting Joseph, and Peter Whitmer, Joseph remaining to draw writings in regard to the printing of the manuscript, which was to be done on the day following." Lucy Smith said this happened "the next day" after the visit to Grandin's office.
24 June?
According to Lucy Mack Smith, as Joseph Smith was setting off to Palmyra to sign the contract with Grandin for the printing of the Book of Mormon, he was informed by a Dr. M'Intyre that a group of 40 men was forming to interfere with his journey. As the men sat along a fence along the way, Smith greeted them cheerfully, one-by-one and by name, and was allowed to pass by. He signed the documents and returned to Manchester.
26 June
The title page of the Book of Mormon is published in The Wayne Sentinel, the weekly Palmyra newspaper published by E. B. Grandin. Grandin announces that he intends to publish the book "as soon as the translation is complete". Grandin had received a copy of the title page from Smith earlier in June.
end of June
Smith completes translation of the Book of Mormon.
11 August
The anti-Masonic Palmyra Freeman calls the Book of Mormon "the greatest piece of superstition that has come to our knowledge." The article gives an account of how the plates were found by Joseph Smith, referring to three visits by "the spirit of the Almighty", "a huge pair of spectacles", golden plates of dimensions eight by eight by six inches, Harris' visit to Samuel Mitchill. The article reproduces the title page of the Book of Mormon. No known copies survive, but the article was reprinted in other newspapers such as the Niagara Courier (27 August 1829).
25 August
A contract is drawn up with E.B. Grandin to print 5,000 copies of the Book of Mormon for $3,000. Martin Harris agrees to mortgage his farm to pay for the printing.
August–March 1830
In Manchester, Oliver Cowdery copies manuscript pages from the originals, gives them to Hyrum, who takes them to E. B. Grandin's printing press. The manuscript is typset by John Gilbert.
2 September
Abner Cole begins publishing the weekly Palmyra Reflector, using E. B. Grandin's printing press. Cole announces, "The Golden Bible, by Joseph Smith, author and proprietor, is now in press and will shortly appear. Priestcraft is short lived!"
16 September
In Abner Cole's Palmyra Reflector, he writes, "The Book of Mormon is expected to be ready for delivery in the course of one year — Great and marvellous things will "come to pass" about those days."
23 September
In Abner Cole's Palmyra Reflector, he writes, "We understand that the Anti-Masons have declared war against the Gold Bible—O! how impious! / The number of Gold Bible Apostles is said to be complete. Jo Smith Jr. is about to assign to each, a mission to the heathen. We understand that Abraham Chaddock intends to build the first house in Harris' New-Jerusalem.... / Some few evenings since, a man in the town of Mendon, had a loud call to go and preach the doctrines contained in the Gold Bible, under heavy denunciations."
30 September
In Abner Cole's Palmyra Reflector, he accuses the editor of the anti-Masonic Palmyra Freeman of plagiarizing the Book of Mormon by using the phrase "Beware of SECRET ASSOCIATIONS". Cole notes that "The 'Gold Bible' is fast gaining credit; the rapid spread of Islamism was no touch to it!"
4–22 October
Smith arrives in Harmony and writes a letter to Oliver Cowdery (still in Manchester) that he has bought a horse from Josiah Stowell, and wants someone to come pick it up.
7 October
In Abner Cole's Palmyra Reflector, he refers mockingly to an article in the Palmyra Freeman (now lost) about Mormonism, and how "the building of the TEMPLE OF NEPHI is to be commenced about the beginning of the first year of the Millennium", and how Mormons were claiming that the Book of Mormon would "astonish the natives".
8 October
Smith and Oliver Cowdery purchase a copy of the Authorized Version of the Bible, Old Testament Apocrypha included, at the E. B. Grandin bookstore, for $3.75. They would later use the book for the Joseph Smith Translation of the Bible.
6 November
In Manchester, Oliver Cowdery replies to Smith's letter, and says that Martin Harris will travel to Harmony and pick up the horse in two or three weeks.
9 December
In Abner Cole's weekly Palmyra Reflector, which used E. B. Grandin's printing press and therefore had access to the Book of Mormon manuscripts, Cole announces that "at the solicitation of many of our readers we have concluded to commence publishing extracts from it on or before the commencement of the second series".
28 December
Cowdery writes to Smith in Harmony, stating that "it may look rather strange to you to find that I have so soon become a printer".

== 1830s ==
=== 1830 ===
==== January ====
- January 2: In Abner Cole's weekly Palmyra Reflector, he prints the first part of Chapter 1 of the First Book of Nephi from the Book of Mormon.
- January 13: In Abner Cole's weekly Palmyra Reflector, he continues to print Chapter 1 of the First Book of Nephi from the Book of Mormon.
- January: Palmyra residents organize a boycott of the Book of Mormon.
- January: E. B. Grandin suspends printing the Book of Mormon.
- January 16: Smith Sr. and Martin Harris sign an agreement on selling copies of the Book of Mormon. It is witnessed by Oliver Cowdery.
- January: Based on assurances from Harris, E. B. Grandin resumes printing the Book of Mormon.
- January 22: In Abner Cole's weekly Palmyra Reflector, he prints an extract from the Book of Alma, chapter 20, from the Book of Mormon.
- January: Threatened with legal action by Hyrum Smith, Abner Cole stops printing extracts of the Book of Mormon.

==== February ====
- early 1830: Martin Harris visits lawyer-philanthropist Charles Butler and asks for a $1300 loan to finance publication of the Book of Mormon, but Butler declines. Harris promises that once the book is printed, Butler will receive a copy, and that once he reads it, he will be converted. Butler later receives a copy. During the Harris describes to Butler his story of taking a transcript of characters to Charles Anthon and Samuel L. Mitchill in New York City.

==== March ====
- March: Smith travels from Harmony to Manchester with Joseph Knight Sr., and learns that Martin Harris has been waffling on his commitment to paying his share of the debt for publication of the Book of Mormon.
- March: Smith dictates a revelation for Martin Harris, explaining a "mystery": Smith reveals that "eternal damnation" or "endless punishment" does not mean punishment forever; rather, it just means "God's punishment". Nevertheless, Harris would suffer that exquisite punishment unless he repented, sold part of his farm, and used the cash to pay off the debt to E.B. Grandin for publication of the Book of Mormon.
- about March: Martin Harris is present at the E. B. Grandin printing press when "The Testimony of Three Witnesses" at the end of the Book of Mormon is being typeset. The typesetter later said that he asked, "'Martin, did you see those plates with your naked eyes?' Martin looked down for an instant, raised his eyes up, and said, 'No, I saw them with a spiritual eye.'"
- March 19: The Wayne Sentinel announces that the Book of Mormon "will be ready for sale in the course of next week".
- March 26: The Wayne Sentinel announces that the Book of Mormon "is now for sale, wholesale and retail, at the Palmyra Bookstore".

==== April ====
- about April 1: Smith gives Oliver Cowdery the brown seer stone he had used to translate the Book of Mormon and for earlier treasure hunting.
- April 6: The Church of Christ is organized in either Fayette or Manchester, New York. A later document from June claims that the church is "regularly organized and established agreeable to the laws of our country", but no articles of incorporation are found in the relevant New York agencies.
- April 6: Smith dictates five revelations, respectively, to Oliver Cowdery, Hyrum Smith, Samuel Harrison Smith, Joseph Smith Sr., and Joseph Knight Sr. (who had not yet decided to join the Church of Christ), describing their duties in the church.
- April 6: Smith dictates a revelation directing that the church keep a record, in which Smith would "be called a seer, a translator, a prophet, and apostle of Jesus Christ, an elder of the church...." It says that Smith has been "inspired to move the cause of Zion in imighty power for good." It says that Smith is to be ordained by Oliver Cowdery, so that Cowdery would be "an elder under [Smith's] hand, he being first unto [Cowdery]". Cowdery is also to be the "first preacher of this church".
- April: Smith dictates a revelation stating that people who had already been baptized within some other faith would need to be re-baptized prior to becoming a member of the Church of Christ. The revelation refers to the faith as "a new and an everlasting covenant".
- April 11: Oliver Cowdery preaches publicly for the first time as an official representative of the newly formed church. In Seneca Lake he baptizes Hiram Page, Catherine Whitmer Page, Christian Whitmer, Anne Schott Whitmer (Christian's wife), Jacob Whitmer, Elizabeth Ann Schott Whitmer (Jacob's wife), and Mary Page.
- April 19: A letter to the editor of the Palmyra Reflector chastises "Hyrum Smith, and some of his ill-bred associates", for losing their cool during proselytizing. The letter refers to these men as "Apostles".

==== May ====
- May: Smith conceives of first proselytizing mission, involving Oliver Cowdery, directed to the Native Americans.

==== June ====
- June 1: An article in the Palmyra Reflector notes that the "apostle to the NEPHITES" Oliver Cowdery has boarded a boat with copies of the Book of Mormon and headed east on the Erie Canal.
- June: Smith begins translating sections the New Testament, claiming to receive information through revelation.
- June 1–9: In Fayette, New York, Smith drafts the "Articles and Covenants of the church of Christ". Both Smith and Oliver Cowdery are described as "an apostle of Jesus Christ, an elder of this church". In the earliest possible reference to Smith's First Vision, it says that "after that it truly was manifested unto this first elder, that he had received a remission of his sins, he was entangled again in the vanities of the world; [b]ut after truly repenting, God ministered unto him by an holy angel...." The document refers to the new office of deacon.
- June 9: Smith presides over the church's first general conference with 27 members in attendance, held in Fayette, New York. The current church elders are Joseph Smith, Oliver Cowdery, Peter Whitmer, David Whitmer, John Whitmer and Ziba Peterson. Joseph Smith Sr., Hyrum Smith, and Martin Harris are ordained priests, and Hiram Page and Christian Whitmer are ordained teachers. The Articles and Covenants are adopted by the church at this conference.
- June 9: Smith performs the first Latter Day Saint miracle, the exorcism of Newel Knight.
- June: Smith has a vision in which Michael the archangel exposes the true identity of Satan, who appears to Smith as "an angel of light". Smith begins dictation of the "vision of Moses" which describes Satan appearing as an angel of light.
- June 12: The Palmyra Reflector prints a satire of the Book of Mormon entitled The Book of Pukei. It refers to "Walters the Magician" (Luman Walter). The "idle and slothful" send for "Walters", who "has strange books, and deals with familiar spirits", in the hope that he would lead them to Nephite treasure. "Walters" led them to a dark grove in Manchester, where he drew a magic circle with a rusty sword, sacrificed a chicken, and allowed his party to commence digging over several nights. However, their excavation was unsuccessful. When the party tires and suspects deception, "Walters" flees with his book, rusty sword, and stuffed Toad back to Great Sodus Bay (near Luman Walter's home), "where he holds communion with the Devil, even to this day." However, "his mantle fell upon the prophet Jo. Smith Jun.", who "made a league with the spirit, who afterwards turned out to be an angel."
- June 30: The Palmyra Reflector sarcastically proclaims that "[t]he age of miracle has again arived", noting that Martin Harris is telling the Palmyra neighborhood about how Smith has cast out a devil "of uncommon size from a miserable man in the neighborhood of the 'great bend' of the Susquehannah."
- June 30 - July 1: Smith stands trial in Colesville, New York for scrying and for performing an exorcism, but is acquitted.

==== July ====
- abt. 6 July: Smith and Oliver Cowdery flee a mob in Colesville toward Harmony Township, Pennsylvania. In the mid-1830s, Smith said that in circumstances that match this flight, Smith and Cowdery saw a vision of Peter, James, and John, who gave them "keys" of apostleship.
- July 7: The Palmyra Reflector continues with Chapter 2 of its satirical "Book of Pukei". The account describes the angel Moroni as "a little old man...clad, as I supposed, in Egyptian raiment, except his Indian blanket, and moccasins—his beard of silver white, hung far below his knees. On his head was an old fashioned military half cocked hat, such as was worn in the days of the patriarch Moses—his speech was sweeter than molasses, and his words were the reformed Egyptian."
- July: In Harmony, Smith dictates a revelation chastising Smith for his "transgressions". It recalls to Smith that he has "been delivered from all thine enemies, and thou hast been delivered from the powers of Satan, and from darkness!" Smith is to sow his fields, and then go to the church in "Colesville, Fayette, and Manchester, and they shall support thee" while Cowdery works full time for "in Zion", but "in temporal labors thou shalt not have strength, for this is not thy calling". Smith is authorized to perform "casting out devils; healing the sick; and against poisonous serpents; and against deadly poisons", but only when commanded by God. If someone does not receive him he is to shake the dust from his feet. He is to travel "without purse or scrip".

==== August ====
- August: Joseph Smith becomes aware of Hiram Page and his use of a seer stone. Page had predicted the location of the New Jerusalem, and most members of the church believed him.
- 1830: Martin Harris claims to be a prophet, and tells Palmyra residents that "'Jackson would be the last president that we would have; and that all persons who did not embrace Mormonism in two years' time would be stricken off the face of the earth.' He said that Palmyra was to be the New Jerusalem, and that her streets were to be paved with gold."

==== September ====
- September: Smith receives a revelation that only he can receive revelations for the church.
- September: Smith receives a revelation that gives him authority to issue commandments to the church on any subject, because "all things unto [God] are spiritual".
- September 26: A church conference is held. Notable events include: (1) The discussion of the Hiram Page seerstone and its refutation by unanimous vote. (2) 35 new members are added, bringing the total number to 62. (3) Peter Whitmer Jr. is called to preach with Oliver Cowdery to the Native Americans. John Whitmer is also called to preach.
- September: Immediately following the conference, Thomas B. Marsh is called to preach.

==== October ====
- October: Parley P. Pratt and Ziba Peterson are called to preach to the Indians. Ezra Thayre and Northrop Sweet are also called.
- October: Sidney Rigdon's Kirtland congregation is converted to Mormonism.

==== November ====
- November: Orson Pratt is called to preach.
- November 4: Smith dictates a revelation to Orson Pratt using his white seer stone.

==== December ====
- December: Smith dictates a revelation instructing the church to assemble in Ohio.
- December: Smith meets Sidney Rigdon, who becomes his scribe in further revision of the Bible. Joseph Smith is commanded to cease revising until the church is gathered in Ohio.

=== 1831 ===
- January: Joseph Smith moves to Kirtland, Ohio.
- January–May: Many of Smith's followers still living in New York move to Kirtland.
- February 4: A revelation names Edward Partridge as the first bishop of the church.
- February 9: D&C 42 is received, laying out the law of the church, including naming specific sins and the punishments thereof.
- June 4: Nineteen men are ordained High Priests, including Joseph Smith, Lyman Wight, and Edward Partridge. Isaac Morley and John Corrill are ordained assistants to Bishop Partridge.
- June 7: The new bishop and several others are called to settle Jackson County, Missouri to build the city of Zion. A small group travels to Independence, Missouri.
- Summer: Revelations identify Zion in Independence, Missouri.
- August 2: Sidney Ridgon dedicates Zion in Independence.
- August 3: Joseph Smith dedicates the Temple Lot in independence.
- August 15: A non-Mormon journalist who visited the Manchester/Palmyra area writes, "On the sides & in the slopes of several of these hills, these excavations [by Smith and his associates in search of chests of money] are still to be seen".
- August 28: Sidney Rigdon ordains Oliver Cowdery a High Priest.
- November 1: A revelation calls for publishing Joseph Smith's revelations, in what would become the Book of Commandments.
- November 11: Revelation is received directing the church to organize presidencies over each quorum in the priesthood.
- December 4: Newel K. Whitney is called as a bishop over Kirtland, Ohio.

=== 1832 ===
- January 25: At a church conference, Joseph Smith is ordained President of the High Priesthood over the entire church.
- January 26: Joseph Smith is confirmed president of the High Priesthood by a church-wide sustaining vote.
- February 16: A revelation to Joseph Smith and Sidney Rigdon depicts the three degrees of glory (D&C 76).
- March: In an unpublished revelation, Joseph Smith is confirmed as having the authority to direct all the affairs of the church and also to appoint counselors in his presidency.
- March 8: Joseph Smith organizes his presidency by appointing Jesse Gause and Sidney Rigdon as counselors.
- March 24: Joseph Smith and Sidney Rigdon are tarred and feathered by a mob outside the John Johnson Farm.
- March 29: Joseph Murdock Smith, the infant adopted by Joseph and Emma Smith, dies from a cold, thought to have been caught during the night of the mobbing.
- June 1: The Evening and the Morning Star begins publication by W. W. Phelps in Independence, the first Latter Day Saint newspaper.
- December 25: Joseph prophesies about a Civil War (D&C 87). This follows the threat of South Carolina to secede from the United States on November 24 of that same year.

=== 1833 ===
- January 22–23: Joseph Smith performs the first known version of the controversial Second Anointing ritual, teaching the participants they were "sealed up unto heaven." 12 men has their feet washed by a towel-clad Joseph Smith included Sidney Rigdon, Frederick G. Williams, Newel K. Whitney, Hyrum Smith, and Joseph Smith Sr. During the ceremony, Joseph Smith Sr. gave Smith a priesthood blessing "pronouncing upon his head that he should continue in his Priests office until Christ come."
- January 23: The School of the Prophets opens for the instruction of select priesthood holders in the Newel K. Whitney Store in Kirtland, Ohio.
- February 27: The Word of Wisdom revelation is received by Joseph Smith during the School of the Prophets, a health code which included cautions against liquor and tobacco.
- March 18: The "keys of the kingdom" held by Joseph Smith are also given to his counselors, now Sidney Rigdon and Frederick G. Williams.
- Spring: The comments of the Mormons in Missouri about freed slaves are misunderstood by other Missourians, raising hostility in the area and a manifesto against the Mormons.
- April 6: General Conference is held on the Big Blue River ferryboat in Jackson County, Missouri. This was the first conference held on the anniversary date of the church's founding.
- Summer: A School of the Elders led by Parley P. Pratt opens in Independence, Missouri, modeled after the School of the Prophets in Kirtland.
- July 2: Work is completed on the first draft of the Joseph Smith Translation of the Bible.
- July 20: An anti-Mormon mob tars and feathers Edward Partridge and destroys the church's printing press in Independence, disrupting printing of the Book of Commandments. Pages of the first 65 revelations were preserved and bound individually.
- July 23: Cornerstones are laid for the Kirtland Temple. Under mob pressure, the Mormons in Jackson County, Missouri make agreements that they will leave the area.
- October: As a result of the hostility in Jackson County, Missouri, Mormons who had settled there move to Clay County.
- December 16: Revelation is received appointing the formation of Stakes of Zion to gather the saints. (D&C 101:21)
- December 18: Joseph Smith ordains his father, Joseph Smith Sr. as Presiding Patriarch and assistant counselor in the First Presidency.

=== 1834 ===
- February 17: A High Council in the Kirtland, Ohio area is organized. The Kirtland Stake of Zion is simultaneously organized.
- May 3: The name of the church is changed from The Church of Jesus Christ to The Church of the Latter Day Saints upon a proposal by Sidney Rigdon, seconded by Newel K. Whitney and passed by the church.
- May 8: Zion's Camp, an armed party led by Joseph Smith, departs from Ohio to defend the Mormons expelled from Jackson County, Missouri. Shortly after arriving in Missouri, the force is disbanded.
- June 30: Zion's camp is disbanded.
- July 7: Twelve High Priests in Clay County, Missouri is organized into a High Council. David Whitmer is ordained president of the council, and John Whitmer and William Wines Phelps are ordained as counselors. Joseph Smith, while ordaining David Whitmer, also appoints him as "Prophet, Seer, Revelator, and Translator" and mentions that he (Whitmer) should succeed him if Joseph "did not live to see God himself."
- October: The Messenger and Advocate, an early Latter Day Saint newspaper, begins publication in Kirtland, replacing The Evening and the Morning Star.
- November: The School of the Elders opens in Kirtland, for missionary training, continuing the work of the School of the Prophets (Kirtland) and the School of the Elders (Independence, Missouri). The Lectures on Faith are first delivered at this school.
- December 5: Joseph Smith ordains Oliver Cowdery as an Assistant President of the Church, with the understanding that Cowdery should act in Smith's absence.
- December 6: Joseph ordains Hyrum Smith as Assistant President of the Church.

=== 1835 ===
- February 14: After a special conference, Oliver Cowdery, David Whitmer, and Martin Harris choose the individuals who are to be in the Quorum of the Twelve Apostles: Thomas B. Marsh, David W. Patten, Brigham Young, Heber C. Kimball, Orson Hyde, William E. M'Lellin, Parley P. Pratt, Luke S. Johnson, William Smith, Orson Pratt, John F. Boynton, and Lyman E. Johnson. Brigham Young, Heber C. Kimball, and Lyman E. Johnson are ordained apostles and members of the Quorum of the Twelve Apostles.
- February 15: David W. Patten, Orson Hyde, William E. M'Lellin, Luke S. Johnson, William Smith, and John F. Boynton are ordained apostles and members of the Quorum of the Twelve Apostles.
- February 17: The committee in charge of compiling Latter Day Saint revelations, comprising Joseph Smith, Oliver Cowdery, Sidney Rigdon, and Frederick G. Williams, issue a letter that later becomes the preface to the 1835 edition of the Doctrine and Covenants. The preface describes the Lectures on Faith as "embracing the important doctrine of salvation", and describes the remaining section as containing "items of principles for the regulation of the church, as taken from the revelations which have been given since its organization, as well as from former ones." In the process of compilation, many of these earlier revelations were extensively revised by the committee.
- February 21: Parley P. Pratt is ordained an apostle and member of the Quorum of the Twelve Apostles.
- February 28: The Quorum of the Seventy is organized. Joseph Young, Hazen Aldrich, Levi W. Hancock, Leonard Rich, Zebedee Coltrin, Lyman Sherman, and Sylvester Smith are called as the seven presidents.
- March 28: The Quorum of the Twelve Apostles meet together and confessed their shortcomings and weaknesses to one another before separating on their missions. At this meeting, Joseph Smith receives Doctrine and Covenants section 107, regarding the priesthood. It clarifies the order and administration of the various offices of the priesthood, appointing the First Presidency, Quorum of the Twelve Apostles, and First Quorum of the Seventy as equals in the church. The decisions of these quorums must be made unanimously. The standing high councils of the several stakes also form a body equal in authority.
- April 26: Thomas B. Marsh and Orson Pratt are ordained apostles and members of the Quorum of the Twelve Apostles. Elder Marsh, erroneously thought to be the eldest, is ordained the president of the quorum.
- July 6: Egyptian mummies and papyrus are purchased for the church, which Joseph Smith would use to produce the Book of Abraham.
- August 17: The church holds its general conference, though Joseph Smith and Frederick G. Williams are absent. The church body unanimously adopts and canonizes the Doctrine and Covenants as compiled by the committee of Smith, Williams, Oliver Cowdery, and Sidney Rigdon. Among the new revelations is D&C 134, concerning the relationship between church, government, and individuals, asserting that governments are instituted by God for the benefit of man; that government should protect the freedom of men to worship as they please; that all men should uphold their government and laws; that churches should not exercise civil powers; and that individuals are justified in defending themselves and their property. Another section 101 was included that condemns the practice of polygamy.
- September: The Doctrine and Covenants is published.
- September 14: Emma Smith is appointed to create a church hymnal, which was printed in 1836.

=== 1836 ===
- January 15: Further organizing the priesthood, presidents of each priesthood quorum are called for the Kirtland Stake of Zion, as is a president of the Kirtland Temple, now nearing completion.
- January 21: Joseph Smith states that he had received a vision in which he saw that salvation is possible for those who die without a knowledge of the gospel (D&C 137).
- January 26-March 26: "Furthermore, he and others had studied Hebrew in Kirtland, Ohio, with Professor Joshua Seixas for two hours a day from January 26 through March 26, 1836."
- March 3: All the presidencies of the church meet in the Kirtland Temple according to their order.
- March 3: Elijah Abel is ordained an elder, perhaps the first black man ordained. Abel continued in priesthood service, even after a ban was placed on blacks in the priesthood.
- March 27: The first dedication of the Kirtland Temple is held (D&C 109).
- March 30: At a solemn assembly in the Kirtland Temple, Joseph Smith comments that he has completed the organization of the priesthood.
- April 3: Joseph Smith and Oliver Cowdery later state that, on this date, Jesus Christ appeared to them and declared the temple acceptable. Moses, Elijah, and Elias are also reported to have appeared in order to confer the keys of the priesthood upon Joseph Smith (D&C 110).
- May 9: John Taylor and his wife are baptized by Parley P. Pratt in Toronto, Ontario, Canada, having converted from Methodism. They would soon move to Kirtland and John would become an apostle two years later and then president of the church in 1880.
- June 29: Clay County residents resolve to ask that the Mormons leave their county. Up to this time, Mormons in the county had not voted on local affairs nor been accused of any crimes. Residents assert that the differences between themselves and Mormon would not allow them to peaceably reside together. The resolution encourages the Mormons to settle in Wisconsin.
- Summer: Under the direction of Alexander W. Doniphan, it is agreed that a new county should be formed for the Mormons called Caldwell County, in what is now Clay County, Missouri. Mormons begin leaving Ray and Clay County to settle the proposed area. Plans for and work on the community of Far West, Missouri begin. Far West, Missouri is the proposed county seat for the new county.
- August 8: The township of Far West, Missouri in Clay County is entered by the Mormons. It would serve as the county seat of the soon-to-be-formed Caldwell County.
- November 2: The Kirtland Safety Society, also known as The Kirtland Bank, is formed for use by church members in financial affairs.
- December 23–27: To ease tensions among Clay and Jackson County residents and provide a county for Mormon settlers, Caldwell County is created by legislation, passing the House on the 23rd and the Senate on the 27th. Daviess County is also created, although disputations about its purpose arise later. Missouri natives feel that the Mormons agreed not to settle it, although no such agreement existed or was acknowledged by the Mormons.

=== 1837 ===
- January 2: Having failed to receive a charter, due to political attitudes against Mormons and banking in general, the church's bank is reestablished as the Kirtland Safety Society Anti-Banking Company, a joint-stock association.
- June 13: The first Mormon mission outside North America, as two apostles depart for England, with the first converts baptized July 30 in Preston.
- September 3: Apostle Luke S. Johnson is disfellowshipped from the church in Kirtland, Ohio. Apostle John F. Boynton is excommunicated.
- October: The Elders' Journal begins publication, the church's periodical in Kirtland, Ohio.
- November: The Kirtland Safety Society closes, overextended and unable to resolve its debts amidst the Panic of 1837. Many who suffered loses blamed church leaders, and disillusionment was widespread in Kirtland.
- December 10: Joseph returns to Kirtland from Missouri.
- December 27: Brigham Young flees Kirtland, Ohio. His life was threatened for vigorously defending Joseph Smith.
- Late December: Many people are excommunicated from the church for various reasons, including Martin Harris, one of the Three Witnesses, because he supported a movement to reform and reorganize the church over the Kirtland bank failure.

=== 1838 ===
==== January ====
- January 12: Joseph Smith and others flee Kirtland, fearing their safety in wake of assertions dealing with the legality and financial viability of the Kirtland Safety Society.
- January 26: The Far West High Council, meeting with apostles Thomas B. Marsh and David W. Patten, reject the presidency of David Whitmer, John Whitmer, and William Wines Phelps, the stake presidency of Far West.

==== March ====
- March 10: John Whitmer and William Wines Phelps are excommunicated by the High Council in Far West.
- March 14: The headquarters of the church is established at Far West, Missouri.

==== April ====
- April 9: Smith and Sidney Rigdon write to John Whitmer and ask him to return the manuscript history of the church that Whitmer had started in 1832. They say that if Whitmer does not return the manuscript, they will start their own history from other materials.
- April 12: The High Council and bishopric in Far West vote to excommunicate Lyman E. Johnson, David Whitmer, and Oliver Cowdery.
- April 13: Apostle Luke S. Johnson is excommunicated from the church after being disfellowhipped and returning for a short period.
- April 26: While in Far West, Missouri, Joseph Smith presents section 115 of the Doctrine of Covenants, naming the church "The Church of Jesus Christ of Latter Day Saints". Also in this revelation, the Lord commands the church to build a temple in Far West. Work begins almost immediately.
- April 27: Smith and Sidney Rigdon begin preparing a church history, with George W. Robinson as scribe. This history describes the most well-known accounts of his First Vision and the visits of the angel Moroni. Though the original manuscript history is not known to exist, it was later copied into the 1839 Manuscript History of the Church, Book A-1. Contrary to earlier and later writing, the history indicates that the angel who appeared to Smith was named "Nephi" (rather than "Moroni", as Smith and Oliver Cowdery had separately said in 1835 publications). Some scholars consider this to be a clerical error, though it was never corrected by Smith in later publications. Other scholars believe that Smith saw both Nephi and the angel Moroni.
- April 30: Sidney Rigdon gives Smith a set of "grammer [sic] lessons" and then they continue preparing the early church history.

==== May ====
- May 1: Smith and Rigdon continue preparing the early church history.
- May 2: After another grammar lesson by Sidney Rigdon, Smith and Rigdon continue preparing the early church history. By this day, they have completed the history up to at least 1827.
- May 8: Smith spends the afternoon "answering the questions proposed in the Elders Journal", one of which was "How, and where did you obtain the book of Mormon?" The answer, published in July 1838, states, "Moroni, the person who deposited the plates from whence the book or Mormon was translated, in a hill in Manchester, Ontario County, New York, being dead, and raised again therefrom, appeared to me, and told me where they were..."
- May 11: Apostle William E. McLellin is excommunicated. He joins forces with some of the anti-Mormon groups to persecute the Mormons.

==== June ====
- June 17: Sidney Rigdon delivers the "Salt Sermon" which generated much excitement in the church and among detractors.
- June 25: A Mormon settlement is established in a church conference above Wight's ferry on Spring Hill in Daviess County. The site is named as Adam-ondi-Ahman.
- June 28: Adam-ondi-Ahman is formed into a stake and thus a gathering place for members of the church. It is the third stake established in the church. John Smith is named president of the stake, with Reynolds Cahoon and Lyman Wight counselors. Vinson Knight is acting bishop. President John Smith then organizes the High Council: John Lemon, Daniel Stanton, Mayhew Hillman, Daniel Carter, Isaac Perry, Harrison Sagers, Alanson Brown, Thomas Gordon, Lorenzo Barnes, George A. Smith, Harvey Olmstead, Ezra Thayer.

==== July ====
- July 4: The cornerstone is laid for the new temple to be constructed at Far West. Sidney Rigdon declares a "war of extermination" on those who intend to remove the saints from their land and deprive them of their liberties.
- July 6: The "Kirtland Camp", 515 members under the direction of the Seventy, leave Kirtland, Ohio for Far West, Missouri.
- July 8: John Taylor, John E. Page, Wilford Woodruff, and Willard Richards are called to the Quorum of the Twelve Apostles to fill vacancies caused by the excommunications of John F. Boynton, Luke S. Johnson, and Lyman E. Johnson, and William E. McLellin (see D&C 118). The twelve are also called to missionary work in England and were to leave on April 26, 1839.
- July 8: Joseph Smith's revelation on tithing (see D&C 119).
- Summer: Settlement in Adam-ondi-Ahman surpasses that of the county seat Gallatin, causing the balance of power to shift towards the Mormons settling in Daviess County.

==== August ====
- August 6: The first battle of the Mormon War occurs as Mormons in Daviess County are prevented from voting in the Gallatin Election. The brawl leaves no one dead, but reports are exaggerated, spawning the 1838 Mormon War.
- August 7: Upon hearing the exaggerated reports of the previous day's battle, Joseph Smith rallies 150 men and marches to Adam-ondi-Ahman to protect the settlement there.
- August 8: Judge Adam Black of Daviess County pledges support of the constitutional rights of everyone in Daviess County, regardless of religion.

==== September ====
- September 4: John N. Sapp, who declared himself a member of a secret Mormon group known as the Danites, swears in an affidavit before the Carroll County clerk concerning the size of the Danite army. He states that they were about 800–1000 well-equipped and ready men.

==== October ====
- October 1–11: Carroll County residents besieges the town of De Witt, which was inhabited by Mormons. Negotiations led to the abandonment of the settlement without violence.
- October 2: The "Kirtland Camp" arrives in Far West, after traveling 3 months through difficult conditions.
- October 14: Under the direction of the state militia, Mormons organize as an official state militia and march to disband the forming mobs in Daviess County. Allegations of property destruction and theft are made against the Mormons. No lives are lost.
- October 19: Thomas B. Marsh, angry with Joseph Smith, leaves the church.
- October 23: Under the pretense that the Mormon militia looted and burned property in Daviess County to disperse the mobs, General Atchison authorizes local groups to patrol the border of Ray County and Caldwell County.
- October 24: Apostles Thomas B. Marsh and Orson Hyde, also disaffected from the church, sign an affidavit claiming that Joseph Smith was trying to take over the world and was using the Danites to murder people. They submit the affidavit to authorities in Richmond, Missouri.
- October 25: The Battle of Crooked River occurs as a unit of Mormon Militia fight against Missouri State Militia. Sixteen are wounded, and 4 die from their wounds, including Apostle David W. Patten.
- October 27: Governor Boggs issues Missouri Executive Order 44, also known as the "Extermination Order" for declaring "the Mormons must be treated as enemies, and must be exterminated or driven from the State if necessary for the public peace—their outrages are beyond all description." It was revoked in 1976 by then Missouri Governor Christopher S. Bond.
- October 30: A renegade militia group from Livingston County attacks a Mormon settlement in the bloodiest conflict of the Mormon War, and 17 are killed. The event is known as Haun's Mill Massacre.

==== November ====
- November 1: Mormon leaders, including Joseph Smith, are taken into custody by the Missouri State Militia and declared responsible for the violence and destruction of the conflict.
- November 2: After a short trial, General Lucas orders the leaders of the church to be executed. General Doniphan refuses, recognizing the charges were inaccurate and that little solid information about the events of the conflict was known. Far West is plundered, and several other leaders are captured. After being allowed a brief good-bye, the leaders are led away to Independence for imprisonment and trial.
- November 3: Joseph prophesies that none of the prisoners are going to die.
- November 4: Fifty-six more prisoners are taken from Far West. The imprisoned leaders arrive in Independence.
- November 6: General Lucas addresses the citizens of Far West. Far West prisoners leave for Richmond.
- November 8: General Wilson surroundes Adam-ondi-Ahman. Joseph and some of the other prisoners in Independence leave for Richmond. Their guards become drunk, but no escape is attempted.
- November 10: All citizens of Adam-ondi-Ahman are acquitted, but they are ordered to move to Caldwell County to prepare to leave Missouri.
- November 13: November 25: Preliminary hearings on the fate of the leaders of the church begin under Judge King. Witnesses testify at the point of a bayonet. Numerous violations of judicial process are recorded. Twenty-three of the imprisoned men are released, leaving thirty in custody. During the hearings, excommunicated members rob the homes of several members in Far West.
- November 13: Joseph F. Smith, future president of the LDS Church, is born in Far West, while his father, Hyrum Smith, is held by Missouri authorities.
- November 28: Joseph and Hyrum Smith, Sidney Rigdon, Lyman Wight, Caleb Baldwin, and Alexander McRae are ordered to the jail in Liberty, Clay County; Parley P. Pratt, Morris Phelps, Luman Gibbs, Darwin Chase, and Norman Shearer are retained in the Richmond jail. The remaining 19 are released or allowed release on bail.

==== December ====
- December 5: Governor Boggs defends his Extermination Order in the Missouri state legislature.
- December 10: A committee of Edward Partridge, Heber C. Kimball, John Taylor, Theodore Turley, Brigham Young, Isaac Morley, George W. Harris, John Murdock, and John M. Burk draft a petition to the state legislature detailing the Mormon side of the conflict.
- December 17: The petition is delivered to the state legislature by David H. Redfield, who also meet with General Atchison, Governor Boggs, and others.
- December 19: John Taylor and John E. Page are ordained apostles and members of the Quorum of the Twelve Apostles.

=== 1839 ===
- January: Mormons begin to flee Missouri, due to fallout from the 1838 Mormon War.
- February: Quincy, Illinois welcomes Mormons refugees from Missouri.
- March 17: Thomas B. Marsh is excommunicated from the church in absentia in Quincy, Illinois.
- March 20–25: While being held in Liberty Jail, Joseph Smith writes a letter to the church that was to become Doctrine and Covenants 121-123.
- April 25: Land is acquired at what would become Nauvoo, Illinois, a new Mormon gathering settlement and church headquarters.
- April 26: Despite threat of violence, the apostles secretly gather in Far West, Missouri, to fulfill prophecy by laying the temple cornerstones and commencing a mission to Great Britain. Also at that meeting, Wilford Woodruff and George A. Smith are ordained apostles and members of the Quorum of the Twelve Apostles.
- May 4: The church votes to remove both William Smith and Orson Hyde from the Quorum of the Twelve Apostles.
- May 9: Joseph Smith moves to Nauvoo, Illinois.
- June 27: Orson Hyde returns to the church to explain his actions and rejoin the church.
- October 6–8: The fall conference is held. Among the notable events that occurred, Orson Hyde and William Smith are restored to the Quorum of the Twelve Apostles. Also, the first wards of the church are created, as geographical subdivisions under a bishop, based on Nauvoo's municipal wards.
- October 29: Joseph Smith departs for Washington, D.C., to meet with the U.S. Congress and President Martin Van Buren and deliver redress petitions for the treatment of the Mormons in Missouri.
- November: The Times and Seasons begins publication, a Latter Day Saint newspaper in Nauvoo.

== 1840s ==
=== 1840 ===
- January 11: The Apostles begin to arrive in England, where their quorum would serve a successful mission into 1841, baptizing thousands and building an important church publishing operation.
- April 14: Willard Richards is ordained a member of the Quorum of the Twelve Apostles and Brigham Young is made president of the quorum, while it is gathered during its British mission.
- April 15: A General Conference for the British Isles was held in Preston, England.
- May 27: The first issue of the Millennial Star is published in Manchester, England, the first church periodical outside North America.
- August 15: The doctrine of baptism for the dead is first taught by Joseph Smith, during a funeral sermon at Nauvoo.
- Autumn: Work on the Nauvoo Temple begins.
- September 14: Joseph Smith Sr., the Presiding Patriarch and father of the church's founder, dies in Nauvoo.
- December 16: The Nauvoo Charter is signed into law, securing the Mormon community greater legal protections.

=== 1841 ===
- January 19: A revelation to Joseph Smith calls for building the Nauvoo Temple and the Nauvoo House. Hyrum Smith is made Assistant President of the Church and Presiding Patriarch. Also, the order of baptism for the dead is laid out. The church is also excused from building the temple in Jackson County due to the persecution at that time. (D&C 124)
- April 6: Cornerstones of the Nauvoo Temple are laid.
- April 8: Lyman Wight is ordained an apostle and member of the Quorum of the Twelve Apostles.
- October 24: Orson Hyde dedicates the Holy Land for the return of the Jews.

=== 1842 ===
- March 1: The Wentworth letter (including the Articles of Faith) and first installment of the Book of Abraham (and its facsimiles) are first published in the Times and Seasons newspaper, shortly after Joseph Smith became its editor.
- March 17: The Female Relief Society of Nauvoo is organized.
- March: The Illinois legislature rejects an act to repeal Nauvoo's charter, which some interpret as putting the city beyond state law.
- May 4: Joseph Smith performs the first full endowment ceremony, in the upper floor of the Red Brick Store.
- May 6: A gunman shoots Governor Boggs in his home, hitting him four times. The gunman is not found, but his revolver was left at the scene. Rumor and speculation points to Porter Rockwell, Joseph Smith's personal bodyguard, as the would-be assassin. Rockwell denies this, remarking that if it was him, Boggs would not have recovered.
- May 28: An anonymous contributor to The Wasp, a pro-Mormon newspaper in Nauvoo, writes that, "Boggs is undoubtedly killed according to report; but who did the noble deed remains to be found out."
- August 6: Joseph Smith supposedly delivers the "Rocky Mountain Prophecy", telling of the Mormons seeking refuge in the mountains of the American west.
- August 20: Elder Orson Pratt is excommunicated for refusing to accept the doctrine of plural marriage.
- September 1 & 6: Joseph Smith writes two letters to the church regarding baptism for the dead, clarifying the doctrine and practice. (D&C 127, 128)
- October 10: Ornamental copies of the Book of Mormon are presented to Queen Victoria by Lorenzo Snow, while serving as a missionary in England.

=== 1843 ===
- 1843: The Kinderhook Plates are created as a joke on the Latter Day Saint movement of which Smith purported to translate.
- May 23: The first Mormon missionaries depart for the Pacific Islands from Nauvoo.
- July 12: Joseph Smith dictates the revelation concerning eternal marriage, or "the new and everlasting covenant", including the plurality of wives (D&C 132). Although written down in 1843, some scholars believe that Smith transcribed a revelation recommending polygamy as early as July 17, 1831 thirty years after the supposed revelation.
- September 28: Joseph Smith and his wife, Emma, becomes the first couple to receive their Second Anointing in a meeting of the Anointed Quorum.
- November 3: Knowleton F. Hanks becomes the first Mormon missionary to be buried at sea.
- December 21: The Nauvoo city leadership petition the U.S. Congress to make Nauvoo a territory, with federal protections.

=== 1844 ===
- January 29: Joseph Smith announces his candidacy for President of the United States, unsatisfied that other candidates would defend the interests of the Latter Day Saints.
- March 11: The Council of Fifty is organized, a quasi-governmental body.
- March 16: The last meeting of the Relief Society in Nauvoo, which was discontinued because of opposition to plural marriage from Emma Smith, its president.
- March 26: Joseph Smith reportedly delivers his "last charge" before the Council of Fifty, of which some of the Apostles were present, which is understood by Brighamites to mean that the apostles now held the authority to succeed him in directing the church.
- April 6–9: The focus of General Conference is shifted from carrying out motions and business to delivering religious instruction. The body of the conference nominates Joseph Smith as a presidential candidate.
- April 7: The King Follett discourse is delivered by Joseph Smith as a public funeral sermon, introducing unique and controversial Mormon doctrines about the nature of God and man.
- May 1: One of the first Mormon missionaries to the islands of the South Pacific Ocean arrives in Tubuai.
- June 7: The only issue of the Nauvoo Expositor is published by men angry with Joseph Smith and the church. It is highly critical of Smith and his doctrines and practices.
- June 10: After being declared a public nuisance by the Nauvoo City Council, the printing press of the Nauvoo Expositor is destroyed.
- June 12: Charles A. Foster, a co-publisher of the Nauvoo Expositor, reports that the destruction of the Expositor printing press two days earlier was carried out by several hundred people and the building the machine was housed in was damaged. The city marshal contradicts him, claiming that the destruction was carried out in an orderly fashion. The building stands for at least ten more years.
- June 18: Amid threats of violence concerning the destruction of the Nauvoo Expositor, Joseph Smith, as mayor, declares martial law in Nauvoo and activates the Nauvoo Legion, a private militia of about 5,000 men.
- June 24: Joseph Smith submits to arrest and agrees to trial in Carthage, Illinois, the county seat. Before he arrives, he prophesies, "I am going like a lamb to the slaughter, but I am calm as a summer's morning. I have a conscience void of offense toward God and toward all men. If they take my life I shall die an innocent man, and my blood shall cry from the ground for vengeance, and it shall be said of me 'He was murdered in cold blood!'" He is held in Carthage Jail.
- June 27: Joseph Smith is killed in Carthage Jail by a mob of about 200 armed men. His brother Hyrum is also killed. John Taylor is wounded, but recovers; the fourth cellmate, Willard Richards, is not harmed. The succession crisis begins when news of Smith's death spreads.
- July 30: Joseph's younger brother, Samuel H. Smith, and next in line to lead the church died from a fever. His family later accused Hosea Stout, who treated him using a white powder, of foul play on the orders of Brigham Young.
- August 8: A conference is held in Nauvoo, Illinois to determine Smith's successor. A majority decides to follow Brigham Young.
- August: James Strang, a convert in Wisconsin, produces a letter of appointment, allegedly by Joseph Smith, naming Strang as his successor. He is denounced by church leaders, but Strang gains an important following, including all of the Smith family, all surviving Book of Mormon witnesses and two members of the Quorum of the Twelve.
- October: The first General Conference of the church under Brigham Young's direction is held.

=== 1845 ===
- January 29: The Nauvoo Charter is revoked, by act of the Illinois Legislature.
- March 3: The Nauvoo Neighbor begins publication by John Taylor, a secular pro-Mormon newspaper.
- April: Lucy Mack Smith is the first woman to deliver a talk at General Conference.
- April 6: The Quorum of the Twelve Apostles issues a proclamation to rulers of the world, announcing that the Kingdom of God has come and inviting all to join.
- May 30: Those on trial for the murder of Joseph Smith are acquitted by jury.
- September 24: Following mob violence in the area, the Twelve Apostles announce that the church will leave Nauvoo. Preparations had already begun in the spring, and departure would begin early 1846, after temple ordinances were performed.
- October 12: William B. Smith, Patriarch to the Church and brother of Joseph Smith, is excommunicated following public disputes with the Twelve Apostles. Thereafter he followed James J. Strang, then declared his own presidency, and then joined with the reorganized church (RLDS Church).
- November: A census of Nauvoo finds the population at just over 11,000. Historians estimate the population at around 12,000 (with around 17,000 Mormons in the county). This makes Nauvoo the second-largest city in Illinois, behind Chicago at 15,000.
- December 10 - February 7, 1846: In the partially completed Nauvoo Temple, ordinances are performed for thousands who will travel west as pioneers.

=== 1846 ===
- February 4: Mormon pioneers begin to leave Nauvoo, Illinois, under the direction of Brigham Young; they eventually arrive at the Salt Lake Valley.
- February 4: The ship Brooklyn departs New York Harbor for California, carrying 238 Mormon emigrants. It would sail around South America and stop at Hawaii before docking in Yerba Buena, California (the future San Francisco), the longest trip for a Mormon pioneer company.
- March 8: Apostle Orson Hyde rebaptizes Luke S. Johnson, a former member of the Quorum of the Twelve Apostles.
- April 24: The Mormon pioneers create a camp at Garden Grove, Iowa.
- May 1: The Nauvoo Temple is completed and dedicated, despite the majority having already left Nauvoo.
- June 14: The Mormon pioneers create a camp at Council Bluffs, Iowa, at the Missouri River.
- June 27: Apostle John E. Page is excommunicated from the LDS church for encouraging members to follow James Strang.
- July 6: The U.S. Army recruits volunteers from the Mormon pioneers into the Mormon Battalion for the Mexican–American War. Enlistment is encouraged by Brigham Young and other church leaders, as well as Thomas L. Kane, a politically-connected Pennsylvanian and friend to the Mormons.
- July 16: The Mormon Battalion is formed, the only religiously based unit in U.S. military history. Brigham Young prophesies that the recruits won't see battle and will perform a great service for their country. Many people join up despite the difficulties of the time. They send as much money to their families and the church as possible.
- July 16: Ezra T. Benson is ordained an apostle and member of the Quorum of the Twelve Apostles.
- July 31: The ship Brooklyn and its company of Mormon pioneers arrives at Yerba Buena.
- August 13: The Mormon Battalion departs from Fort Leavenworth, marching toward San Diego, California.
- September 10–17: The Battle of Nauvoo sees the city shelled as the Mormons evacuate westward.
- September 23: Mormon pioneers establish camp at Winter Quarters, Nebraska.

=== 1847 ===
- January 14: Brigham Young receives D&C 136 by way of revelation, which concerns the organization of the westward movement, standards of behavior for the saints, and an explanation on why God allowed Joseph Smith to be killed.
- January 29: The Mormon Battalion completes their 2,000 mile march, arriving in San Diego, California.
- April 9: The first company of Mormon pioneers departs west from Winter Quarters, led by Brigham Young.
- July 16: The Mormon Battalion is disbanded in Los Angeles, California.
- July 24: The first settlers arrive in the Salt Lake Basin. This is later memorialized at This Is The Place Heritage Park in Emigration Canyon, and is celebrated annually as Pioneer Day.
- July 28: Traveling with a group of leaders, Brigham Young puts his cane in the ground and marks the location of the future Salt Lake Temple.
- August: Arriving settlers form a choir, which would later become the Mormon Tabernacle Choir.
- December 24: Latter-day Saints complete the Kanesville Tabernacle in Council Bluffs, Iowa, which was constructed in just two weeks and housed over 1,000 people.
- December 27: At a General Conference held in the Kanesville Tabernacle, the First Presidency is reorganized with Brigham Young as president, Heber C. Kimball as first counselor, and Willard Richards as second counselor.

=== 1848 ===
- January 24: Mormon Battalion members, who stay behind in California to raise money, discover gold in Sutter's Mill. News of the find spreads, starting the 1849 California gold rush.
- February 2: The Treaty of Guadalupe Hidalgo is signed, which will grant the territory that the Mormons are settling to the United States.
- March 10: The U.S. Senate ratifies the Treaty of Guadalupe Hidalgo, making the treaty official and thus officially making the area part of the United States.
- June 9: The Miracle of the Gulls occurs. It is attributed to saving the crops of the first Mormon settlers in Utah.
- June: Jesse Strang moves his community from Voree, Wisconsin to Beaver Island, Michigan.
- October: General Conference was held in Utah for the first time, utilizing the open-air bowery.
- October 8: The Nauvoo Temple is burnt down by an unknown arsonist, two years after its dedication. The remnants are later destroyed by a tornado.
- November: Oliver Cowdery, one of the original Three Witnesses to the golden plates, is rebaptized into the LDS Church in Iowa.
- December 3: Apostle Lyman Wight is excommunicated for not following Brigham Young west and instead keeping his colony in the Republic of Texas.

=== 1849 ===
- February 12: Charles C. Rich, Lorenzo Snow, Erastus Snow, and Franklin D. Richards are ordained apostles and members of the Quorum of the Twelve Apostles. This is done to replace those serving in the First Presidency and to replace the vacancy caused by the excommunication of Lyman Wight.
- March: The Icarians, a French-based utopian socialist movement, establish their first permanent commune in Nauvoo, Illinois where they bought property from the Mormons migrating west.
- March 5: The State of Deseret is created by LDS Church leaders, as a provisional government aspiring for statehood before congress eventually created the Territory of Utah.
- October 6: The Perpetual Emigrating Fund is created to help Mormon pioneers who cannot afford the cost of migrating to Utah.
- December 9: The Sunday School is first organized in the LDS Church.

== 1850s ==
=== 1850 ===
- February 2: Brigham Young announces the campaign to exterminate the Timpanogos, known as the Battle at Fort Utah
- February 28: The University of Deseret is founded.
- April 6: Full transcriptions of General Conference are taken for the first time, and published in the Deseret News.
- June 15: The Deseret News is first published.
- September: At General Conference, Brigham Young is sustained as prophet, seer, and revelator for the first time, although he was already President of the Church.
- September 20: The Compromise of 1850 creates the Utah Territory, designating Fillmore, Utah, as its capitol and Brigham Young as governor. The territory is allowed to decide its own policy towards slavery.
- December 12: The first LDS missionaries arrive in the Hawaiian Islands.

=== 1851 ===
- May: Danish translation of the Book of Mormon, the first non-English edition.
- June: Mormon settlers establish San Bernardino, California.
- July 11: The Pearl of Great Price is first published in England as a booklet, compiled by Franklin D. Richards, president of the British Mission.
- November 1: The Journal of Discourses releases its first issue, disseminating sermons of Brigham Young and other leaders of the church.
- November 8: Parley P. Pratt arrives in Chile, the first Mormon missionary to South America.

=== 1852 ===
- January 16: Brigham Young declares to the Utah Territorial Legislature that black men may not be ordained to the priesthood, affirming a practice of recent years.
- February 4: Act in Relation to Service passed, legalizing slavery in Utah Territory
- March 7: Act for the relief of Indian Slaves and Prisoners passed, legalizing Indian slavery in Utah Territory.
- April 8: Work begins on creating the Deseret Alphabet.
- August 28: Orson Pratt publicly announces Plural Marriage within the LDS Church, which was beforehand practiced only secretly in Nauvoo and as an open secret in Utah Territory.
- French, German, Italian and Welsh language translations of the Book of Mormon.

=== 1853 ===
- February 4: The temple site for the Salt Lake Temple is dedicated.
- April 6: The groundbreaking ceremony is held for the Salt Lake Temple.
- July: The Walker War begins between Mormon settlers and the Shoshone, consisting mostly of pioneer raids and Indian retaliation.

=== 1854 ===
- March 11: President Willard Richards, second counselor in the First Presidency, passes away in Salt Lake City, Utah.
- April: Jedediah M. Grant is called an apostle and into the First Presidency as second counselor.

=== 1855 ===
- May 5: The Endowment House is dedicated on Temple Square in Salt Lake City, for performing LDS temple ordinances in the absence of an operating temple.
- Hawaiian language translation of the Book of Mormon, the first in a non-European language.

=== 1856 ===
- July 9: James Strang is assassinated in a conspiracy involving enemies from nearby Mackinac, disgruntled former followers and federal officers aboard the US Naval ship USS Michigan, docked at Beaver Island, Michigan. A few days later, the Mormons on Beaver Island are forced from their homes at gunpoint onto ships and scattered penniless in small groups at different ports along the river to keep them from grouping together for support. This ends the Beaver Island Kingdom.
- September 7: Jedediah M. Grant, Second Counselor to President Brigham Young, is sent to preach in the Mormon Reformation, where fiery sermons called for rededication and rebaptism.
- September 26: The first of the Mormon handcart pioneer companies arrives in the Salt Lake Valley.
- October 21: The Willie Handcart Company, stranded in a Wyoming blizzard, is reached by a rescue party from Salt lake City. This was "perhaps the worst disaster in the history of western migration" which "could also be regarded as the most heroic rescue of the Mormon frontier." Along with the also-stranded Martin Handcart Company, more than 200 died.
- December 1: Jedediah M. Grant dies.
- December 18: Salt Lake City replaces Fillmore as the capitol of the Utah Territory.

=== 1857 ===
- May 13: Apostle Parley P. Pratt is murdered by Hector McLean and two others near Van Buren, Arkansas. Pratt had married McLean's former wife in plural marriage. Pratt was acquitted on charges of interfering in McLean's marriage a few days earlier.
- July 18: The federal government troops known as Johnston's Army depart from Fort Leavenworth, Kansas on the "Utah Expedition" to replace Brigham Young as governor. This results in the Utah War.
- July 24: Brigham Young hears word of the federal army en route to confront the Mormons in Utah Territory.
- August 5 - September 15: Brigham Young, acting as governor, declares martial law in Utah Territory.
- September 11: The Mountain Meadows massacre occurs as travellers passing through Utah from Missouri are murdered near Mountain Meadows, Utah.
- October: Mormon militia raiding parties in Wyoming slow the pace of Johnston's Army into Utah.

=== 1858 ===
- March–May: About 30,000 Mormons in northern Utah settlements (including the Salt Lake Valley) are evacuated south to Utah Valley, near Provo, in anticipation of the coming federal army in the Utah War. Some few are left behind to care for crops, with instructions to burn the homes if the army intended to occupy them.
- June 11: Peace is negotiated to end the Utah War.
- June 26: Johnston's Army passes through the mostly-deserted Salt Lake City, en route to set up Camp Floyd, west of Utah Lake.
- June 30: With resolution to the Utah War, Mormon settlers return from Utah Valley northward to their Salt Lake Valley homes evacuated in the spring.

=== 1859 ===
- July 13: Horace Greeley, famous editor of the New-York Tribune, visits Salt Lake City and interviews Brigham Young.

== 1860s ==
=== 1860 ===
- April 3: The Pony Express first arrives in Salt Lake City.
- April 6: Latter Day Saints who stayed in the Midwest, and didn't accept or follow Brigham Young, reorganize a separate church under Joseph Smith III. This became the Reorganized Church of Jesus Christ of Latter Day Saints (RLDS Church). This included the largest portion of the Strangites.
- August 24-September 6: Richard F. Burton, the famous British adventurer, visits Utah and meets notable figures like Brigham Young and Porter Rockwell. He publishes a book about it the next year.
- August 26: George Q. Cannon is ordained an apostle and member of the Quorum of the Twelve Apostles.
- September 24: The last of the Mormon handcart pioneer companies arrives in Salt Lake City.

=== 1861 ===
- April 23: The first "down and back" company leaves Salt Lake Valley, with 200 wagons with supplies and oxen headed toward Florence, Nebraska, to assist with bringing Mormon immigrants back into Salt Lake.
- October 18: The Transcontinental Telegraph is linked to Salt Lake City, Utah. Brigham Young and Abraham Lincoln are among the first to send messages with the new link.

=== 1862 ===
- March 6: The Salt Lake Theatre is dedicated, the largest building in frontier Utah at the time.
- June 13–15: The Morrisite War, in which a posse of the territorial militia surrounds a fort holding the followers of Joseph Morris, who await the Second Coming, and two prisoners. After ultimatums, firefight, and melee, eight Morrisites are killed and one of the posse.
- July 8: President Abraham Lincoln signs the Morrill Anti-Bigamy Act, which not only bans plural marriage but limits church and non-profit ownership in the territories to $50,000. The measure has no funds allocated for enforcement, and President Lincoln's opinion is to leave the Mormons alone if they leave him alone.
- August 6: Patrick E. Connor becomes commander of the U.S. Army in Utah. He represents the federal government in Utah as it had pulled out due to the American Civil War. He establishes Fort Douglas and encourages his men to find valuable ores so that miners are enticed to settle in Utah to offset the Mormon population.

=== 1864 ===
- February 4: Brigham Young Jr. is ordained an apostle by President Brigham Young. It is not until four years later that he becomes a member of the Quorum of the Twelve Apostles.
- July 26: The cornerstone is laid for the construction of the Salt Lake Tabernacle.
- Valuable ores are discovered in Tooele County, Utah, sparking a rush of new, non-Mormon immigrants to Utah.

=== 1865 ===
- April 9: Utah's Black Hawk War breaks out, the deadliest conflict in the territory's history, where Mormons and Indians fought over resources and land, until federal troops intervened in 1872.
- October: With the Salt Lake Tabernacle under construction, the choir at General Conference is first referred to as the Tabernacle Choir.

=== 1866 ===
- January 1: The Juvenile Instructor starts publication, a privately run magazine for LDS youth and children.
- July 1: Joseph F. Smith, son of Hyrum Smith, is ordained an apostle and member of the Quorum of the Twelve Apostles.

=== 1867 ===
- January 18: The Deseret Telegraph Company is opened by the LDS Church, allowing communication with the rest of the United States.
- October 6: The Salt Lake Tabernacle opens for its first General Conference.
- October: Joseph F. Smith joins the Quorum of the Twelve Apostles of the LDS Church, marking seniority that would later place him as President of the Church.
- December 8: The Relief Society is reinstituted by Eliza R. Snow at the request of Brigham Young, after being disbanded in 1844.

=== 1868 ===
- September 25: The last Mormon pioneer wagon train arrives in the Salt Lake Valley.
- October 9: Brigham Young Jr., already an ordained apostle, is adopted into the Quorum of the Twelve Apostles.

=== 1869 ===
- March 1: Zion's Cooperative Mercantile Institution (ZCMI) is started.
- May 10: The First transcontinental railroad is completed at Promontory Summit, north of the Great Salt Lake. The railroad brings increasing numbers of non-Mormons into the state, and several influential non-Mormon businessmen would make fortunes in the territory.
- June 25: The first Mormon immigrants who have traveled entirely by rail from the eastern United States arrive in Salt Lake City.
- November 28: Young Ladies' Retrenchment Association is organized, the beginning of the LDS Church's Young Women's organization.
- December: The Godbeites organize as a reform movement in Mormonism.
- Deseret Alphabet edition of the Book of Mormon published.

== 1870s ==
=== 1870 ===
- February 1: The founding of the Salt Lake Tribune, which was originally called the Mormon Tribune.
- February 9: The Liberal Party is established to oppose the Church of Jesus Christ of Latter-day Saints in Utah Territory politics.
- February 12: Women's Suffrage is passed by the Utah Territorial Legislature, among the earliest such laws, second only to Wyoming Territory in 1869. It remains in effect until 1887, when it is banned by federal legislation. This was pushed by the church to enhance the voting power of its members, as most women in the territory were Mormon.
- June 12–14: John Philip Newman, U.S. Senate chaplain, debates Orson Pratt, an LDS Apostle, about whether the Bible sanctions polygamy. The proceedings are published by the Deseret News in book form.
- July 16: The People's Party organizes to support the church, on the same day that the anti-Mormon Liberal Party holds its first convention. This division highlighted religious polarization and emerging non-Mormon influence in territorial politics. Until this point, politics was run by the church almost exclusively, with Mormons being the vast majority of citizens.
- August 30: Martin Harris, one of the Three Witnesses of the golden plates, arrives in Salt Lake City where he joins with the LDS Church under Brigham Young.

=== 1871 ===
- September: President Brigham Young is indicted for adultery due to his plural marriages.
- November 9: The St. George Utah Temple is announced. Simultaneously, the dedication and groundbreaking ceremonies are held by Brigham Young.

=== 1872 ===
- January 2 - April 25: Brigham Young is held in house arrest for the charge of polygamy, but not held on trial.
- June: The Women's Exponent newspaper begins publication.

=== 1874 ===
- Winter: The United Order is reintroduced to Utah.
- June: Non-Mormon Liberal Party members in Tooele County, Utah gain control of the county government, beginning the first government run by non-Mormons in Utah. They whimsically rename the county "The Republic of Tooele". The federally appointed governor and courts uphold the election, refusing to examine charges by the Mormon People's Party that many voters had voted illegally without satisfying voter requirements.
- June 23: The Poland Act gives greater control of Utah Territory to federal courts, intended to assist in polygamy prosecutions.

=== 1875 ===
- June 10: The Young Men’s Mutual Improvement Association (YMMIA) is founded.
- October 9: The Salt Lake Tabernacle is dedicated.
- October 16: Brigham Young Academy is founded in Provo, Utah.

=== 1876 ===
- January 7: The first LDS missionaries enter Mexico.
- The Mormon-controlled legislature of the Utah Territory passes laws requiring voter registration and women's suffrage in all local elections. This will lead to the Liberal Party losing its majority in Tooele County.
- October: A greatly revised edition of the Doctrine and Covenants, prepared by Orson Pratt, is the first to be published in Utah. This edition reorders sections into chronological order, introduces verses and new introductions, lists real names alongside code names, removes the "Statement on Marriage" which denied the practice of polygamy (originating as section 101 in the 1835 first edition, later as section 109), and adds twenty-six new sections, including section 132 on eternal and plural marriage.

=== 1877 ===
- January 1: Erastus Snow holds the private dedication of the St. George Utah Temple, the first operating temple in Utah. Although it was the third completed temple, after Kirtland and Nauvoo, it was the only one under LDS Church ownership at that time.
- March: With the end of the Reconstruction Era, federal attention shifts to the American West, including the campaign against Mormon polygamy.
- March 23: John D. Lee is executed by firing squad, twenty years after his role in the Mountain Meadows Massacre.
- March 30: Brigham Young initiates a Priesthood Reorganization, restructuring leadership and practices across the church.
- April 6–8: Daniel H. Wells holds the public dedication of the St. George Utah Temple.
- August 29: President Brigham Young passes away, after leading the LDS Church for 33 years. Young is succeeded by John Taylor, President of the Quorum of the Twelve Apostles.
- September 4: The Quorum of the Twelve Apostles, under Taylor, are sustained as the leaders of the LDS Church.

=== 1878 ===
- August 25: The Primary organization is founded for LDS children.
- The Liberal Party majority disappears in Tooele County. They lose the next election, although the new winners are not seated until next year.

=== 1879 ===
- January 6: In the first case before the Supreme Court regarding the first amendment, the court upholds the 1862 Morrill Anti-Bigamy Act banning plural marriage in the landmark Reynolds v. United States.
- July 21: A Mormon missionary in Georgia, Joseph Standing, is killed by an anti-Mormon mob.
- October 4: The Contributor begins publication, a periodical for the Mutual Improvement Associations for Young Men and Young Women.
- After six months of delay tactics and formalities, the Mormon-run People's Party regains control of Tooele County, after 5 years of rule by the non-Mormon Liberal Party. The county is left with $16,000 in debt."

== 1880s ==
=== 1880 ===
- April 6: A Year of Jubilee is declared for the 50-year anniversary of the founding of the church, and a push to reduce poverty with the church forgiving Perpetual Education Fund debts and encouraging food donations.
- June 19: Eliza R. Snow is appointed general president of the Relief Society, which she had revived and been leading since 1868.
- August 19: Mormon missionaries are expelled from Germany.
- October 10: General Conference:

The Pearl of Great Price is canonized.
The First Presidency is reorganized three years after President Brigham Young's death. John Taylor is named president.
Francis M. Lyman and John Henry Smith are called to the Quorum of the Twelve Apostles.

=== 1882 ===
- January 8: The Salt Lake Assembly Hall is dedicated on Temple Square.
- February 25: After a bitter dispute between George Q. Cannon (who won a decisive victory) and Liberal Party candidate Allen G. Campbell over who was allowed to represent Utah territory in the House of Representatives, both are denied the position. George Q. Cannon's practice of polygamy was the deciding issue and re-sparks national controversy on the topic.
- March 23: The Edmunds Act declares polygamy a felony. The act not only reinforces the 1862 Morrill Anti-Bigamy Act but also revokes the right of polygamists to vote, disallows them from holding political office, and also makes them ineligible to serve on the jury, regardless of whether they are practicing or merely believe in it. All elected offices in the Utah Territory were vacated, an election board was formed to issue certificates to those who denied polygamy and did not practice it, and new elections were held territory-wide. Practicing polygamists would have their civil rights taken away without a trial or due process. Adulterers and fornicators had no such penalties applied and did not lose their rights.
- July 17: Deseret Hospital in Salt Lake City is opened, under the direction of the Relief Society.
- August 23: Rudger Clawson is tried for polygamy by a jury composed of 12 non-Mormons. Even though the polygamous marriage was performed before the 1862 Morrill act, he is tried ex-post facto, in clear violation of the Constitution of the United States. He is imprisoned and fined for his marriage.
- October 16: George Teasdale and Heber J. Grant are ordained apostles and members of the Quorum of the Twelve Apostles.

=== 1883 ===
- April 14: Quorums of Seventy are created locally for each stake.

=== 1884 ===
- May 15: John W. Taylor, son of LDS Church president John Taylor, is ordained an apostle and joins the Quorum of the Twelve Apostles.
- May 17: The Logan Temple is dedicated, the second temple in the western United States.

=== 1885 ===
- February 1: President John Taylor goes underground to avoid being arrested and tried for plural marriage.
- February 3: The state of Idaho enacts a "test oath", banning Mormons from voting, jury service, elected office.

=== 1887 ===
- February 19: The Edmunds-Tucker Act is passed by the U.S. Congress, abolishing women's suffrage, and seizing control of the church and its assets.
- March 3: The Edmunds-Tucker Act becomes law.
- April 26: The first Mormon settlement is created in Alberta, Canada.
- July 25: John Taylor dies, while in hiding during the federal antipolygamy campaign, leaving Wilford Woodruff to assume control of the church.
- July 30: The attorney general of the United States files suit and seizes all assets of the church and the Perpetual Emigration Fund.
- November: The LDS Church rents its former properties, including Temple Square, back from the federal government.

=== 1888 ===
- January 25: David Whitmer dies in Richmond, Missouri, the last of the Three Witnesses.
- May 21: The Manti Temple is dedicated, the third temple in the western United States.

=== 1889 ===
- April 6: The Relief Society holds its first conference in Salt Lake City.
- April 7: Two years after the death of John Taylor, the First Presidency is reorganized with Wilford Woodruff as president.
- October: The Young Woman's Journal is first published.
- October 7: Marriner W. Merrill, Anthon H. Lund, and Abraham H. Cannon are ordained apostles and members of the Quorum of the Twelve Apostles.
- November: The Endowment House is demolished, as a show of renouncing new plural marriages.
- The Liberal Party is elected to run Ogden, Utah.

== 1890s ==
=== 1890 ===
- The Liberal Party wins the Salt Lake City, Utah elections, taking control of that city in addition to Ogden, Utah.
- May 19: The Supreme Court upholds the Edmunds-Tucker Act in The Late Corporation of the Church of Jesus Christ of Latter-day Saints v. United States
- September 24: President Woodruff records the 1890 Manifesto.
- September 25: President Wilford Woodruff issues the 1890 Manifesto (Official Declaration 1) ending the official practice of polygamy.
- October 6: At a General Conference, President Lorenzo Snow submits the manifesto for a vote; many members abstain from voting.
- Daniel Webster Jones publishes Forty Years Among the Indians.

=== 1891 ===
- March: The Relief Society is one of the original member organizations in the founding of the National Council of Women of the United States.
- June: The People's Party disbands and members of the church join one of the two national parties as the effort continues to achieve statehood. With three effective parties in the territory, the Deseret News calls the Liberal Party the "bastard party" even though it is able to take a third of the seats in the state legislature.

=== 1893 ===
- January 4: All polygamists are given executive pardon in preparation for statehood. This restores their right to vote.
- April 6: The Salt Lake Temple is dedicated, exactly 40 years after construction began.
- September 8: The Mormon Tabernacle Choir, on its first concert tour, receives second place at the choral competition of the World's Columbian Exposition (World's Fair) in Chicago.
- The Liberal Party (Utah) disbands as members join the national parties in anticipation of statehood.

=== 1894 ===
- March 4: Following the lengthy Temple Lot Case against the Church of Christ (Temple Lot), U.S. District Judge John Finis Philips rules that the RLDS Church is the rightful successor to Joseph Smith's original church. The decision is reversed the following year.
- April 5: A revelation to Wilford Woodruff does away with the law of adoption and calls for proxy sealing of spouses together and children to their parents, regardless of whether they were baptized in life.
- November 13: The Genealogical Society of Utah is founded.

=== 1895 ===
- June 9: The first stake is organized outside the U.S., in Cardston, Alberta, Canada.

=== 1896 ===
- January 4: Utah is recognized by the federal government and achieves statehood as the 45th state. Polygamy is explicitly banned in the state constitution. Women's suffrage is reinstated.
- April 5: The Mormon Political Manifesto is announced, requiring church approval before LDS leaders run for office. Moses Thatcher dissented from the manifesto, leading to his removal from the Quorum of the Twelve Apostles.
- November 5: The first Sunday of the month is designated Fast Sunday, replacing the fast on the first Thursday of the month.

=== 1897 ===
- November: Improvement Era magazine begins publication, for youth auxiliaries and other church committees.

=== 1898 ===
- April: General Conference reports begin to be published semiannually.
- September 2: Wilford Woodruff dies.
- September 13: Lorenzo Snow becomes fifth president of the LDS Church.
- November 8: B. H. Roberts, well known Mormon leader, is elected to congress, but is denied his seat over accusations of polygamy.

=== 1899 ===
- May 17: Lorenzo Snow receives a revelation in St. George, Utah encouraging all members to pay a full tithe.
- Articles of Faith is published by James E. Talmage, which became an LDS classic.

== See also ==
- Death in 19th-century Mormonism
- Mormonism in the 20th century
- Mormonism in the 21st century
