= The Wayne Sentinel =

The Wayne Sentinel was a weekly newspaper published in Palmyra, New York beginning in 1823, and continuing at least until 1863. In the late 1820s, the newspaper was one of the first media sources to report on the spiritual claims that were made by Joseph Smith, founder of the Latter Day Saint movement. On 26 June 1829, the Sentinel reported on local rumors of a "Golden Bible" and reproduced the text of the title page of the Book of Mormon, which was not published until March 1830. The Wayne Sentinel and the Book of Mormon were published in Palmyra by E. B. Grandin.
