= New Israelites =

Defunct Christian denomination (1790s-1802)

The New Israelites were a radical sect founded by Nathaniel Wood in Vermont in the 1790s. Wood declared his followers "modern Israelites," and the group practiced a strict dietary code as they understood to be instructed in the Law of Moses. Like most radical sects, the group displayed spiritual gifts and made prophecies. At one point the group began building a temple, although the project was eventually abandoned.

== History ==
Nathaniel Wood formed the New Israelites in Middletown, Rutland County, Vermont at the end of the 1790s. Originally a Congregationalist, Wood was excommunicated in 1789, after which he began to preach to small meetings whose attendees were mostly family and relatives. The sect may have been influenced by the Newent Separates of Norwich, who believed in perfectionist immortalism and spiritual wifery, and the preaching of Rev. Joel Benedict, who taught that Hebrew was the angelic tongue.

The sect claimed literal descent from the Ten Lost Tribes of Israel, and they practiced divination. After the sect was joined by a counterfeiter and treasure seer named "Winchell" (probably Justus Winchell) in the spring or early summer of 1800, the New Israelites began dowsing to look for buried treasure in Middletown and Rutland, Vermont. They also embarked on the construction of a temple. The group employed the divining rod for both treasure hunting and other forms of revelation. It was suspected that these efforts masked a counterfeiting operation. Wood predicted the arrival of a "Destroying Angel" on 14 January 1802 that would bring down plagues and earthquakes upon the "gentiles."

On 14 January 1802, the day that Wood said would be the commencement of the Apocalypse, as the sect gathered together to await the arrival of the "destroying angel", the locals were so alarmed that on the night in question the militia was called out. The militia then fired their weapons to disperse this "Fraternity of Rodsmen". This event was subsequently known as the "Wood Scrape." After the Wood Scrape, Wood and his family moved to Ellisburg, New York, and the sect became extinct.

== Possible connection to Mormonism ==
Members of the New Israelites may have included Joseph Smith, Sr., the father of Joseph Smith, Jr., and William Cowdery, father of Book of Mormon witness Oliver Cowdery. The best case exists for connecting Cowdery family, as they are known to have lived near the Woods in the early 19th century, and later attended a Congregationalist church in Poultney, Vermont after the Wood Scrape. Oliver Cowdery, who was not born at the time of the Wood Scrape, was later known as a dowser, and was the second highest ranking early leader of the Latter Day Saint movement, next to Joseph Smith, Jr. Witnesses from Vermont connected William Cowdery to the sect, before these witnesses could have known from media reports that his son Oliver was a dowser.

Vermont residents who were interviewed by a local historian said that Joseph Smith, Sr. was also part of the New Israelites, and was one of its "leading rods-men". However, there is no historical consensus linking Smith to the New Israelites because of the difficulty in placing Joseph Smith, Sr. in Rutland County, Vermont during that time period. Although residents said that he lived in Poultney, Vermont "at the time of the Wood movement here", there are no other records placing Smith closer than about 50 miles away. On the other hand, Smith's involvement with the New Israelites would be consistent with his links to Congregationalism and his reported admission in 1837 that he entered the money digging business "more than thirty years" ago.
