= Nathaniel Wood (occultist) =

Leader of the New Israelites

- Born: November 19, 1729; Norwich, Connecticut
- Died: August 27, 1815 (aged 85); Woodville, Jefferson County, New York
- Known for: New Israelites

Nathaniel Wood Sr. (November 19, 1729 – April 27, 1815) was the leader of a sect called the New Israelites, which was formed in Middletown, Rutland County, Vermont at the end of the 1790s. Wood emigrated from New Parish in Norwich, Connecticut, to Bennington, Vermont. From Bennington he moved to Rutland County in 1761. Wood may have been influenced by the Newent Separates of Norwich, who believed in perfectionist immortalism and spiritual wifery, and the preaching of Rev. Joel Benedict, who taught that Hebrew was the angelic tongue. Wood was excommunicated from the local Congregationalist church in 1789. Subsequently, he began to preach to small meetings whose attendees were mostly family and relatives.

Wood claimed literal descent from the Ten Lost Tribes of Israel and to possess the powers of revelation. After coming into contact with a treasure seer by the name of Justus Winchell, the New Israelites commenced looking for buried treasure and embarked on the construction of a temple. The group employed the divining rod for both treasure hunting and other forms of revelation. It was suspected that these efforts masked a counterfeiting operation. Wood predicted the arrival of a "Destroying Angel" that would bring down plagues and earthquakes upon the "gentiles." For this reason one might arguably call the New Israelites a Millennarian group. The locals were so alarmed that on the night in question the militia was called out. When this apocalypse failed to occur, Wood and his family moved to Ellisburg, Jefferson County, New York. This event was subsequently known as the "Wood Scrape."
