= Solomon Mack =

Veteran of the American Revolutionary War

- Born: 15 September, 1732; Lyme, New London County, Connecticut
- Died: 23 August, 1820; Gilsum, New Hampshire
- Occupations: Farmer, manufacturer, merchant, shipmaster, real estate investor, and freighter
- Known for: being the maternal grandfather of Joseph Smith Jr.
- Spouse: Lydia Gates
- Parent(s): Ebenezer Mack and Hannah Hanlly

Solomon Mack (15 September 1732 – 23 August 1820) was a resident of eighteenth-century New England and a veteran of the French and Indian War and the American Revolutionary War.

== Early life ==
Solomon Mack was born on September 15, 1732, to Ebenezer Mack and Hannah Huntley in Lyme, New London County, Connecticut. According to Solomon's memoir, his parents once "had a large property and lived in good style", but by the time Solomon was four, the family had fallen on hard times. Solomon was "bound out" to a nearby farmer, whom he lived with until age 21.

== War and marriage ==
From 1755 to 1759, he served in the French and Indian War, initially enlisting "under the command of Capt. Henry and was annexed to a regiment commanded by Col. Whiting". In 1759, he received "a large separation pay" and purchased the town of Granville, New York, with the money; however, a leg injury prevented him from building up Granville, and soon the land was "completely lost." He married schoolteacher Lydia Gates that same year. The couple had around four children. Solomon Mack was the grandfather of Joseph Smith Jr., founder of the Latter Day Saint movement.

From 1771 to 1776, Mack lived in Marlow, New Hampshire. Then, in 1776, he fought in the American Revolutionary War. During the war, he and his sons Jason and Stephen Mack "embarked on a privateering expedition" to obtain cannons for the American army. Throughout his life, Mack worked as a farmer, freighter, merchant, and more. Around 1799, he moved to Tunbridge, Vermont.

== Later life ==
In 1811, he self-published his memoir, "Narrative of the Life of Solomon Mack", which detailed his history and his conversion to Christianity.

Solomon Mack died on August 23, 1820, in Gilsum, New Hampshire, at the age of 87. He was buried in the Bond Cemetery in Gilsum. Today, there is a historic marker in Vermont at the site of the Solomon Mack home.
