= E. B. Grandin =

American printer (1806–1845)

Egbert Bratt Grandin (March 30, 1806 – April 16, 1845) was a printer in Palmyra, New York, best known for publishing the first edition of the Book of Mormon, a sacred text of the churches of the Latter Day Saint movement.

== Biography ==
Grandin was born in Freehold, Monmouth County, New Jersey, the youngest of ten children, and was reared on a farm near Palmyra, New York. At eighteen, he became an apprentice printer at the office of Palmyra's Wayne Sentinel, which he purchased in 1827. Besides publishing the newspaper, Grandin sold and bound books and operated a lending library. He married Harriet Rogers in 1828; they had six children, five of whom lived to adulthood. Grandin died at Palmyra.

== Grandin Print Shop and the first publication of the Book of Mormon ==
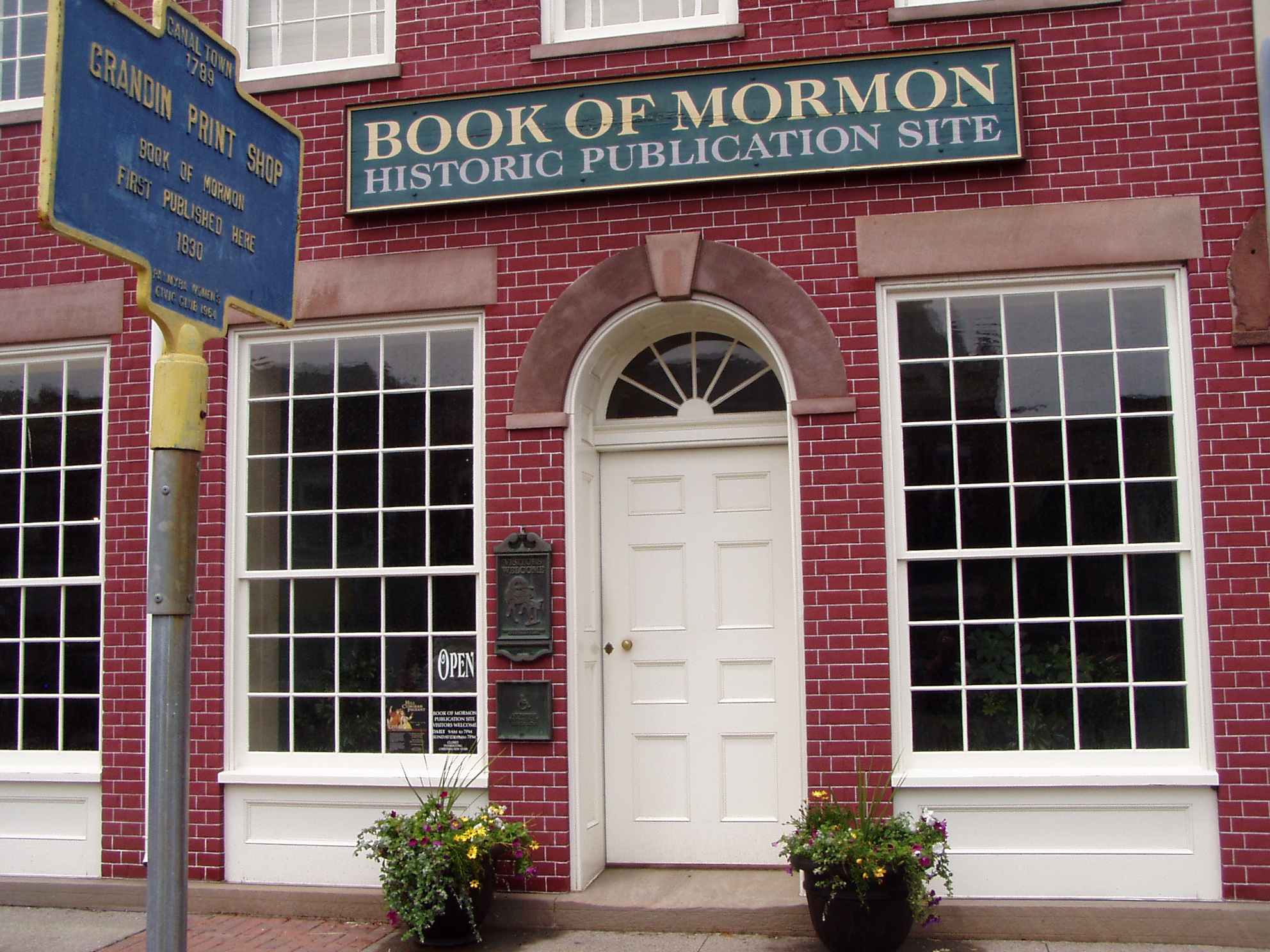
Facade of the Grandin print shop in Palmyra, New York, as restored by the LDS Church

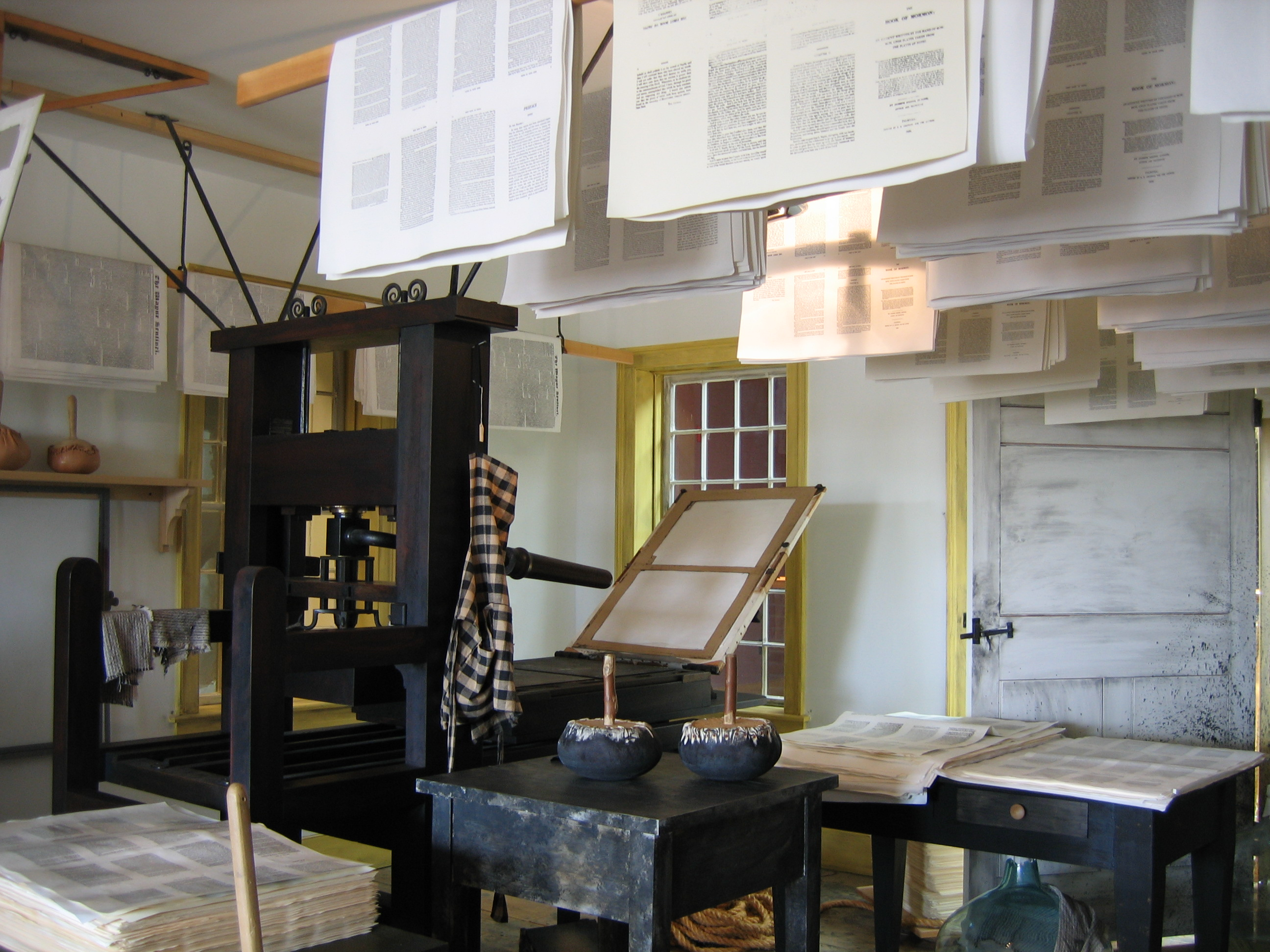
A printing press inside the restored print shop

Grandin first rejected the request of Joseph Smith to publish the Book of Mormon possibly "out of principle because he considered the book to be fraudulent and suspected that it would be a risky financial venture." Smith then sought a Rochester printer to do the job. "Realizing the work would proceed anyway, Grandin apparently overcame his scruples or his reservations and agreed to publish the work in Palmyra," requiring a $3000 security to print five thousand copies. "Fulfilling his wife's worst fears," Martin Harris, a well-to-do farmer and early believer in Smith's revelations, mortgaged his farm as security for the costly endeavor, effectively ending his marriage.

On June 26, 1829, the twenty-three-year-old Grandin announced in the Wayne Sentinel that he intended to publish the Book of Mormon "as soon as the translation is complete." Oliver Cowdery prepared a copy of the manuscript, and Grandin bought "500 pounds of new small pica type" in New York. The chief compositor, John H. Gilbert, found that the manuscript was "closely written and legible, but not a punctuation mark from beginning to end." Gilbert said that he added punctuation and capitalization in the evenings. Cowdery also set some type. To print the book, Grandin used a Smith Improved Printing Press invented by Peter Smith (1795–1823), which first appeared on the market about 1821 and was the most up-to-date press available to the small printer of the day.

In October, Smith wrote that locals were "very much excited" by the prospect of publication, but their excitement was not the sort that Smith had hoped for. The Palmyra Freeman called the prospective book "the greatest piece of superstition that has come to our knowledge." In September, Abner Cole began a weekly, the Palmyra Reflector, and because he used Grandin's press, Cole had access to the unbound sheets and reprinted mocking excerpts until Smith threatened legal action. According to Smith's mother, Lucy Mack Smith, locals then organized a boycott, and Grandin "panicked and suspended publication until Joseph managed to allay his fears." Smith received a revelation for Harris, "a commandment of God and not of man," that he should "not covet" his property "but impart it freely to the printing of the Book of Mormon which contains the truth and the word of God .... Pay the debt thou hast contracted with the printer."

By late March 1830, the Book of Mormon was available for sale, but the entire first edition was not complete until early summer. Harris desperately tried to sell the books himself but lamented that "no Body [sic] wants them." Harris's farm was sold for $3000 and the proceeds paid to Grandin. In 1999, a copy of Grandin's first edition of the Book of Mormon sold for $58,000; in 2000 another copy was sold for $44,000; and in 2007 a copy was sold at auction for $180,000.

On March 26, 1998, the anniversary of the first printing, The Church of Jesus Christ of Latter-day Saints (LDS Church) dedicated a restoration of part of the original Grandin establishment, which the church maintains and where it offers free guided tours.

On September 18, 2017, the LDS Church purchased the Cowdery manuscript used by Grandin. The church bought the manuscript from the Independence, Missouri-based Community of Christ for a reported price of $35 million. The Community of Christ, formerly the Reorganized Church of Jesus Christ of Latter Day Saints, had owned the manuscript since 1903.
