= Folk magic and the Latter Day Saint movement =

Early practices of the Latter Day Saints

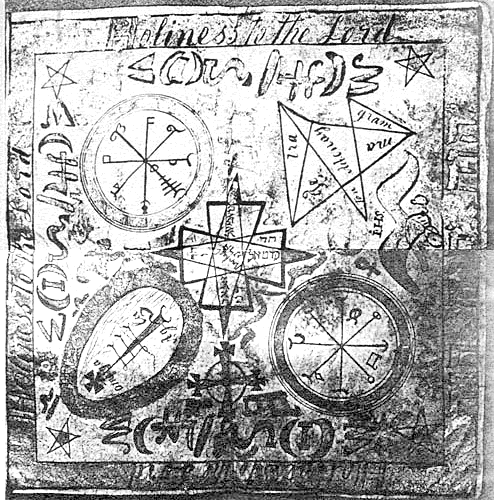
This "Holiness to the Lord" lamen (Latin for 'plate'), a cloth inscribed with astrological signs and symbols, was one of several owned by the Hyrum Smith family

Cunning folk traditions, sometimes referred to as folk magic, were intertwined with the early culture and practice of the Latter Day Saint movement. These traditions were widespread in unorganized religion in the parts of Europe and America where the Latter Day Saint movement began in the 1820s and 1830s. Practices of the culture included folk healing, folk medicine, folk magic, and divination, remnants of which have been incorporated or rejected to varying degrees into the liturgy, culture, and practice of modern Latter Day Saints.

Early church leaders were tolerant of and participated in these traditions, but by the beginning of the 20th century folk practices were not considered part of the orthopraxy of most branches of the movement, including the Church of Jesus Christ of Latter-day Saints (LDS Church). The extent that the founder of the movement Joseph Smith and his early followers participated in the culture has been the subject of controversy since before the church's founding in 1830, and continues modernly.

== Folk magic in the early American frontier ==
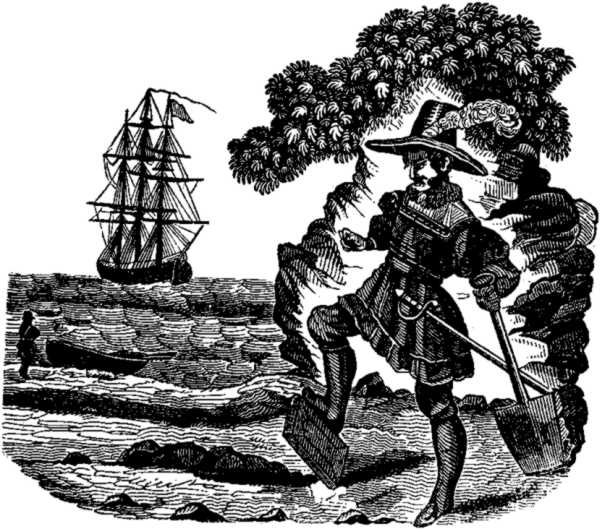
Pirate leader Captain Kidd, famous for hiding treasure, depicted burying a bible

Folk magic was an extremely widespread practice throughout the American frontier of the early 19th century among Christians of all denominations. Divining rods were widely used to find locations for wells. Seasonal markers were important to farming cultures, including the Solstices (the shortest and longest days of the year) and the Equinoxes (when daytime and nighttime are nearly-equal in duration). Astrology was a widespread practice.

Treasure hunting was a common pastime, inspired by stories of Native American relics, Spanish mines, and the pirate Captain Kidd burying gold and a bible. On July 24, 1822, the local newspaper in Palmyra reprinted an article titled "The Money Diggers" about the wave of treasure digging going on throughout New England. It reported that one man in Pennsylvania had discovered a treasure worth $50,000 (equivalent to $1,200,000 in 2025). The article explained "We could name, if we pleased, at least five hundred respectable men, who do, in the simplicity and sincerity of their hearts, verily believe that immense treasures lie concealed upon our Green Mountains; many of whom have been for a number of years, most industriously and perserveringly engaged in digging it up."

Frontier Americans often believed in the ability of some people to have supernatural sight aided by stones, crystals, minerals, or glass. "Glass-looking", scrying, and use of a 'peep-stone' or 'seer-stone' were thought to aid in finding lost items. Lore held that buried treasures might be associated with ghosts or spirits of the dead, particularly people who had, in life, been murdered in connection to the treasure. Visions or dreams, particularly thrice-repeated dreams, were seen as a way for spirits to contact the living.

== Joseph Smith and folk magic ==
Joseph Smith and his family were folk magic practitioners and Smith described himself as a "seer" throughout his life. The family was controversial in the region for their practice of nighttime treasure digs aided by incantations, charms, magic circles, animal sacrifices, and allegedly necromancy. Joseph Smith's recently deceased older brother was reportedly exhumed and Smith reportedly left the Methodists amid accusations of necromancy. As early as 1834, the Smiths' involvement in folk magic was documented in the book Mormonism Unvailed.

The church consistently minimized and denied Smith's usage of magic. As late as 1954, Joseph Fielding Smith claimed, incorrectly, that seer stones had not been used during the dictation of the Book of Mormon.

Smith's involvement in magic received further attention in the 1980s when forger (and later bomber) Mark Hoffman created the Salamander letter, a fake letter which purported to corroborate Willard Chase's account that Smith "saw in the box something like a toad, which soon assumed the appearance of a man, and struck him on the side of his head". By 1984, even church critics were claiming that Hoffman's letter wasn't authentic and it was ultimately revealed to be a forgery. However, as a Church article noted: "such issues as Joseph Smith's involvement in treasure-seeking and folk magic remain. Ample evidence exists for both of these". In 1987, D. Michael Quinn's Early Mormonism and the Magic World View brought wide attention to the topic.

In 2003, South Park episode "All About Mormons" introduced a global audience to Smith's use of a seer stone to dictate the Book of Mormon. A decade later, in a 2013 essay, the LDS church publicly acknowledged that a seer stone had been used in the translation of the Book of Mormon. Scholar John-Charles Duffy praised the essay for candidly admitting that Smith didn't translate the plates while actually looking at them, but instead by placing a seer stone in a hat and pressing his face into the hat. In 2015, the LDS church released images of one of Smith's seer stones.

== Extended chronology ==
The Smith family and their neighbors practiced a form of folk religion, which, although not uncommon in his time and place, was criticized by many contemporary Protestants "as either fraudulent illusion or the workings of the Devil." Both Joseph Smith Sr. and at least two of his sons worked at "money digging," using seer stones in mostly unsuccessful attempts to locate lost items and buried treasure. In a draft of her memoirs, Lucy Mack Smith referred to folk magic:

I shall change my theme for the present, but let not my reader suppose that because I shall pursue another topic for a season that we stopt our labor and went at trying to win the faculty of Abrac, drawing magic circles or soothsaying, to the neglect of all kinds of business. We never during our lives suffered one important interest to swallow up every other obligation. But whilst we worked with our hands, we endeavored to remember the service of and the welfare of our souls.

D. Michael Quinn has written that Lucy Mack Smith viewed these magical practices as "part of her family's religious quest" while denying that they prevented "family members from accomplishing other, equally important work." Jan Shipps notes that while Smith's "religious claims were rejected by many of the persons who had known him in the 1820s because they remembered him as a practitioner of the magic arts," others of his earliest followers were attracted to his claims "for precisely the same reason."

Smith reports using seer stones in the translation of the Book of Mormon, as well as in the reception of several early revelations in the Doctrine and Covenants.

=== Scrying ===
In the early 1820s in the region where Joseph Smith grew up there was a subculture that practiced scrying through the use of "seer stones" or "peep stones". Smith's hometown of Palmyra was no exception. Historian D. Michael Quinn states "Until the Book of Mormon thrust young Smith into prominence, Palmyra's most notable seer was Sally Chase, who used a greenish-colored stone. William Stafford also had a seer stone, and Joshua Stafford had a 'peepstone which looked like white marble and had a hole through the center.'" Historian Richard Bushman adds Chauncy Hart, and an unnamed man in Susquehanna County, both of whom had stones with which they found lost objects.

In September 1819, Smith reportedly borrowed a stone from local seer Sally Chase and used it to scry the location of a stone that was buried under a tree 150 miles away.

From about 1819, Smith regularly practiced scrying, a form of divination in which a "seer" looked into a seer stone to receive supernatural knowledge. Smith usually practiced "peeping" or seeing by putting a stone at the bottom of a white stovepipe hat, putting his face over the hat to block the light, then divining information from the stone. Smith and his father achieved "something of a mysterious local reputation in the profession—mysterious because there is no record that they ever found anything despite the readiness of some local residents to pay for their efforts."

According to Tucker (1867, p. 20), Smith was paid 75 cents to locate a stolen roll of cloth with his seer stone, though the cloth was never found.

=== Treasure digs led by Walters ===
In 1822 and 1823, Luman Walters served as a seer for a treasure dig on the property of Abner Cole in Palmyra. Alvin Smith, Joseph Smith and their father reportedly participated in this dig. Walters possessed a magical book and a seer stone, which he used to locate buried treasure.

Abner Cole recalled that "Walters the Magician" had drawn magic circles and "sacrificed a Cock for the purpose of propitiating the prince of spirits" during the treasure dig. Cole described Walters as having a ceremonial sword, a seer stone, a stuffed toad, and a book in Latin. Cole recalled that Walters was "once committed to the jail of this country for juggling". He also stated that the dig ended in disappointment.

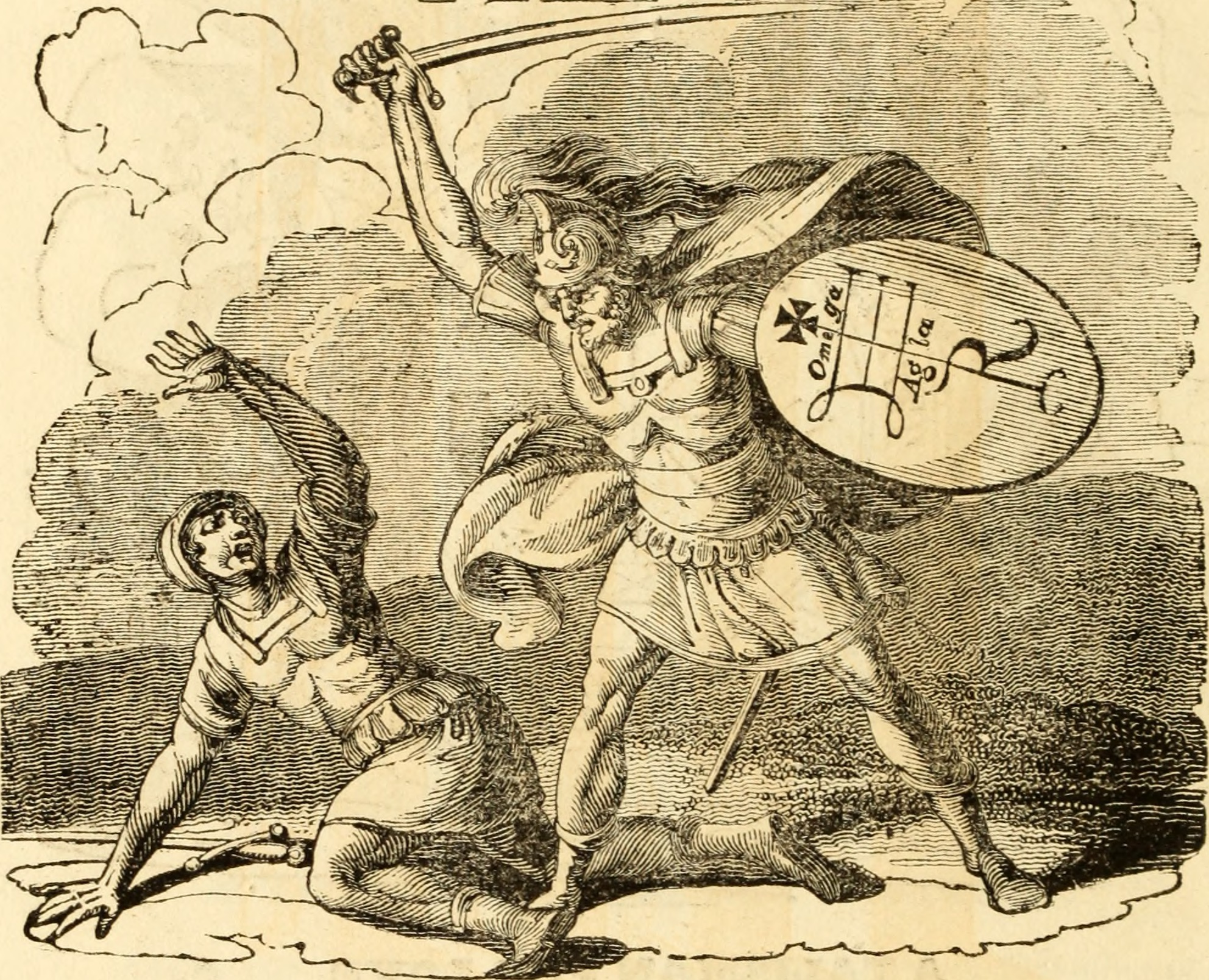
An engraving from the 1825 book The astrologer of the nineteenth century features a symbol on a shield that also appears on the 'Holiness to the Lord' lamen.

Walters claimed the enchantment on the treasure was too great for him to lift. Before departing Palmyra, Walters reportedly singled out Joseph Smith as the one with the power to obtain the treasure. Walters "pointed out Joseph Smith, who was sitting quietly among a group of men in the tavern, and said, 'There was the young man that could find [the treasure]', and cursed and swore about him in a scientific manner: awful!"

D. Michael Quinn speculates that the "Holiness to the Lord" lamen was constructed in August or September 1823 to allow a 'pure youth' to contact a 'good spirit', perhaps by Walters.

=== Dream visitation of Treasure Guardian ===
Joseph Smith consistently listed September 21–22, 1823 as a pivotal night in his life. Early reports describe that after a night time treasure dig, Smith was in bed when he had a remarkable dream. He was reportedly being visited by a spirit in a thrice-repeating dream. Joseph Sr. explained the "spirit" was a "little old man with a long beard", while a later account based on Oliver Cowdery described "an angel of light" appearing to Smith in a dream.

Smith said that on the night of Sunday, September 21, 1823, the spirit of an ancient American, visited him and told him of treasure buried nearby. September 21, 1823 was both a full moon and the autumnal equinox.

=== Later stories of failed retrieval ===
According to stories circulated in 1827, Smith had travelled to the hill in 1823 and attempted to obtain the treasure, but failed. Instead, he was ordered to return the following year with his older brother Alvin.

In an account written by Joseph Knight Sr. (1805-1844):

He [Joseph] exclaimed "why Cant I stur this Book?" And he was answered, "you have not Done rite; you should have took the Book and a gone right away. You cant have it now." Joseph says, "when can I have it?" The answer was the 22nt Day of September next if you Bring the right person with you. Joseph says, "who is the right Person?" The answer was "your oldest Brother."

Willard Chase recalled Joseph Sr. having told him of spirit appearing to Joseph Jr. in a vision followed by a failed retrieval on September 22. According to Chase, Smith was orderd that "after obtaining it, he must go directly away, and neither lay it down nor look behind him", but he did not follow the instructions. Recalled Chase:

"He saw in the box something like a toad, which soon assumed the appearance of a man, and struck him on the side of his head. — Not being discouraged at trifles, he again stooped down and strove to take the book, when the spirit struck him again, and knocked him three or four rods, and hurt him prodigiously. After recovering from his fright, he enquired why he could not obtain the plates; to which the spirit made reply, because you have not obeyed your orders. He then enquired when he could have them, and was answered thus: come one year from this day, and bring with you your oldest brother, and you shall have them."

Benjamin Saunders similarly recalled that during the failed retrieval attempt, "there was something down in the box that looked some like a toad that rose up into a man which forbid him to take the plates."

=== Alvin's death and necromancy rumor ===
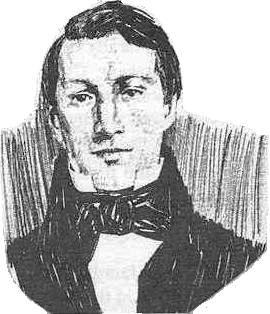
Joseph's older brother Alvin died in 1823 at the age of only 25.

Just weeks after Joseph's report of his dream visitation, his older brother Alvin experienced a case of "bilious colic". Administered a calomel cure, Alvin died from mercury poisoning on November 19, 1823, at the age of 25. According to a history written by his mother, Lucy Mack Smith, as Alvin lay dying, he urged his brother Joseph to fulfill all of the requirements to obtain the treasure. Vogel argues this account of Alvin's deathbed instruction suggests the requirement for Alvin to personally retrieve the treasure was a later addition, dating to after Alvin's death.

Alvin's funeral was held at the Presbyterian church. According to an 1893 account by his brother William, "Rev. Stockton had preached my brother's funeral sermon and intimated very strongly that he had gone to hell, for Alvin was not a church member". William cites this as a reason that Joseph Sr. would not join the Presbyterians.

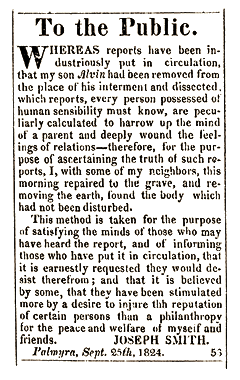
Alvin Smith exhumation notice

During his life, Alvin Smith had participated in a treasure dig under the direction of Luman Walters, a travelling necromancer. After Alvin's death on November 19, 1823, the Smith family reportedly "heard a rumor that Alvin's body had been exhumed and dissected. Fearing it to be true, the elder Smith uncovered the grave on September 25, 1824, and inspected the corpse." Following the exhumation, Joseph Smith Sr. printed a notice in the local newspaper on September 29, 1824 explaining that Alvin's body had been exhumed to verify it has not been removed from the grave. In Joseph Smith: The Making of a Prophet, historian Dan Vogel notes that "Joseph Sr.'s explanation for disinterring Alvin's body is questionable because one should have been able to determine if the grave had been disturbed without exhuming the body. It seems probable, therefore, that Joseph Sr. himself may have been the source of the rumor, that the story was a ruse to exhume Alvin's body for its use in attempting to get the gold plates."

Historian D. Michael Quinn, in his book Early Mormonism and the Magic World View, suggests that the newspaper notice published by Smith Sr. is evidence that the "guardian," "spirit" or "angel" commanded Joseph to bring a piece of Alvin's body to the hiding place of the golden plates as a requirement for seeing them. Quinn argues that when Smith did not do this, he was unable to see the plates for a second time and had to wait another year. Additionally, Quinn suggests that this information was obscured in official church history because it implies Smith's participation in necromancy.

Residents of Pennsylvania recalled that in June 1828, Smith briefly joined the Methodist church but resigned after others in the church complained about his membership. One member recalled: "we thought it was a disgrace to the church to have a practicing necromancer, a dealer in enchantments and bleeding ghosts, in it." In 1834, the book Mormonism Unvailed reported that Joseph Smith had "become very expert in the arts of necromancy, jugling, the use of the divining rod, and looking into what they termed a 'peep-stone'". The book featured an account of Smith neighbor William Stafford who relayed a story of Joseph sacrificing a black sheep to appease an evil spirit guarding a treasure.

=== Expeditions to Harmony, Bainbridge, and Colesville ===
In October 1825, Josiah Stowell, a well-to-do farmer from South Bainbridge, Chenango County, New York, who had been searching for a lost Spanish mine near Harmony Township, Susquehanna County, Pennsylvania with another seer, traveled to Manchester to visit his son. While there, he consulted Smith "on account of having heard that he possessed certain keys, by which he could discern things invisible to the natural eye." According to Stowell, Smith looked into a seer stone in a hat and described Stowell's home and the other buildings on the property. Smith and his father travel to Harmony hoping to raise money to pay off their Manchester farm. On November 1: Smith, Sr, Smith Jr., and seven others sign a contract for a money digging company in Harmony Township, Susquehanna County, Pennsylvania. The money digging company stayed at the home of Isaac Hale, father of Smith's future wife Emma Hale. On November 17 the money digging company disbanded. Smith continued to work for Josiah Stowell and attended school. Smith used two stones to search for treasure.

In November, Smith traveled to Colesville, New York for a few months to work for Joseph Knight Sr. Smith directed further excavations on Knight's property and at other locations around Colesville.

=== Disorderly person arrest and release ===
On March 20, 1826, Smith, age 20, was arrested by Constable Philip De Zeng and taken to court in Bainbridge, New York, on the complaint of Josiah Stowell's nephew, who accused Smith of being "a disorderly person and an imposter" for his role as a treasure seer.

Examined by the Justice, Joseph Smith Jr, Joseph Stowell and Joseph Smith Sr. all acknowledged Joseph Jr. had a stone he looked at in order to find lost treasure. While the testimony actually implicated Smith as a "glass-looker" Vogel argues multiple points would have suggested leniency in the case. Smith was a minor, only 20 years of age, with his father present as a character witness. Smith had not solicited business as a seer but had instead been recruited to the job by the elder Stowell. Smith did not stand accused of fraud, Josiah Stowell spoke in Smith's defense, and Smith expressed a willingness to discontinue looking into the stone. While the outcome of the case is uncertain, Joseph Smith was freed and allowed to return home. While decades later rumor suggested he might have escaped custody, Vogel dismisses them as Joseph would revisit Bainbridge in the coming years—something he could not do were he a fugitive.

=== Anticipation of plate recovery ===
In June 1827, Smith Sr. told fellow treasure seeker Willard Chase that several years ago, a spirit had appeared to Smith and told him about a golden book.

In August, Smith and his wife Emma visited Harmony to retrieve Emma's possessions. According to Peter Ingersoll, who helped move Emma's furniture from Harmony to Manchester, Smith confessed that he could not see anything in the seer stone and promised his father-in-law Isaac Hale that he would give up using it.

Throughout the fall, stories that Smith was about to recover the treasure were given "wide circulation". Smith approached Willard Chase, a carpenter and treasure seeker, asking him to make a strong chest in exchange for a share in the profits generated by the expected treasure. On September 20, Josiah Stowell and Joseph Knight Sr. arrived in Manchester in anticipation of Smith obtaining the treasure.

=== Chase seer attempts theft of plates ===
Joseph Smith's mother records that Sally Chase's abilities as a seer were used by locals to try to find and steal the gold plates from Joseph after he had obtained them. "A young woman by the name Chase (Sister to Willard Chase) found a green glass, through which she could see many very wonderful things, and, among her great discoveries, she said that she saw, the precise place where 'Joe. Smith kept his gold Bible hid.' And, obedient to her directions, they gathered their forces and laid siege to the cooper shop."

=== From treasure guardian to angel ===
In Smith's time and place, it was extremely unusual to refer to the spirit of a deceased person as an "angel"; angels were viewed as non-human beings. Vogel argues that "angel" is anachronistic to 1823. In 1830, the local newspaper relayed that "Jo. made league with the spirit, who afterwards turned out to be an angel".

=== Cowdrey and Kimball ===
Both Joseph Smith Jr. and his father used divining rods.

One of Joseph Smith's early revelations, now canonized in the Doctrine and Covenants, stated that Oliver Cowdery had the power to use a divining rod. Cowdery was told that he had the gift of "working with the sprout, behold it hath told you things. Behold there is no other power save God that can cause this thing of Nature [sic] to work in your hands." Wording was changed in later editions of the Doctrine and Covenants referring to Cowdery's rod as the "gift of Aaron". The term "sprout" was often used to describe divining rods in the 1820s and '30s.

Heber C. Kimball was given a three and a half foot rod by Joseph Smith, with which he practiced rhabdomancy, believing "all he had to do was kneel down with rod in his hands and ... sometimes the Lord would answer his questions" by causing the rod to move. According to Kimball, he would ask yes–no questions, movement meant "yes" and no movement meant "no". His use of the rod for divining continued until at least 1862.

=== 1830 Hiram Page stone ===
Hiram Page, one of the Eight Witnesses of the Book of Mormon, was living with his in-laws the Whitmers in Fayette, New York. Smith arrived in August 1830 to discover Page using a black "seer stone" to produce revelations for the church. The revelations were regarding the organization and location of Zion. Cowdery and the Whitmer family believed the revelations were authentic. In response, Smith announced in a new revelation during the church's September conference that Page's revelations were of the devil (Doctrine and Covenants, Section 28:11). At the conference there was considerable discussion on the topic. Page agreed to discard the stone and the revelations and join in following Smith as the sole revelator for the church. The members present confirmed this unanimously with a vote. The fate of the stone and revelations was not recorded by contemporary sources and has been the subject of interest ever since. Martin Harris's brother Emer stated second-hand in 1856 that the stone was ground to powder and the associated revelations were burned. Apostle Alvin R. Dyer stated that he had discovered Page's seerstone in 1955, that it had been passed down through Jacob Whitmer's family. The validity of this claim has been questioned.

=== "Urim and Thummim" ===
The Urim and Thummim described in the Old Testament were elements of the breastplate worn by High Priest. In July 1832, Mormon leaders first began describing the "spectacles" as the "Urim and Thummin". It has been argued that Joseph Smith and Oliver Cowdery adopted the term as part of a larger effort to distance the church from early folk magic practices.

=== Kirtland and Salem treasure hunts ===
In August 1836, upon hearing that "a large amount of money [that] had been secreted in a cellar of a certain house in Salem, Massachusetts", Joseph, Hyrum, Cowdery and Rigdon travelled there and attempted to rent lodgings in the house to find the treasure.

In 1836, at the age of 10, James C. Brewster began to claim that he had been visited by the Angel Moroni, the same angel that Joseph Smith Jr claimed had led him to the golden plates. In November 1837, due to his persistent claims of being a prophet, Brewster was disfellowshipped from The Church of Jesus Christ of Latter-day Saints. In 1843, Brewster claimed that in 1836 prior to an Ohio treasure quest, that presiding Patriarch Joseph Smith Sr. "anointed the mineral rods and seeing stones with consecrated oil, and prayed over them in the house of the Lord in Kirtland."

=== 1838 ===
A young woman living at the home of David Whitmer in Ohio in 1838 reported receiving a number of revelations about the downfall of Joseph Smith by looking through a black stone that she had found. Some disaffected church members followed after her.

=== 1841 Mountford artifacts ===
In 1841, apostles Wilford Woodruff and George A. Smith confiscated several seer stones and grimoires from convert William Mountford in Staffordshire, England. The grimoires were destroyed and seer stones were sent to Nauvoo. Joseph Smith examined the stones and stated that they were "Urim and Thummim as good as ever was upon the earth" but that they had been "consecrated to devils."

=== Mars Dagger ===
Hyrum Smith inherited and passed down several relics to his descendents. These include a "Mars Dagger", Mars being the ruling planet of Joseph Smith Sr.'s birth year. Inscribed on one side of the dagger is the astrological symbol for mars, the occult seal of Mars, and "Adonay", a Hebrew word for "God". On the blade of the dagger is the zodiacal sign of Scorpio. Specially consecrated daggers or swords were often prescribed when drawing magic circles. Several factors lead scholars to believe that the dagger originally belonged to Joseph Smith Sr.: Palmyra residents where the Smith family resided did not mention Hyrum as a participant in the frequent treasure digs that Joseph Smith Jr. and his father participated in, sources frequently mention Joseph Smith Sr. and his son Joseph Smith Jr. drawing magic circles, the astrological signs on the dagger belonged to Joseph Smith Sr. not Hyrum, and Joseph Sr. ordained Hyrum as a patriarch on his deathbed making him a natural heir of family heirlooms.

In 1843, James C. Brewster, who had formed a splinter group, claimed that in 1836 prior to an Ohio treasure quest, that presiding Patriarch Joseph Smith Sr. "anointed the mineral rods and seeing stones with consecrated oil, and prayed over them in the house of the Lord in Kirtland."

Apostle Willard Richards had a black cane that he used to lay on people's head who had a sickness in order to heal them "through the power of God."

Amulets, Charms and Talismans owned by members of the Latter Day Saint movement
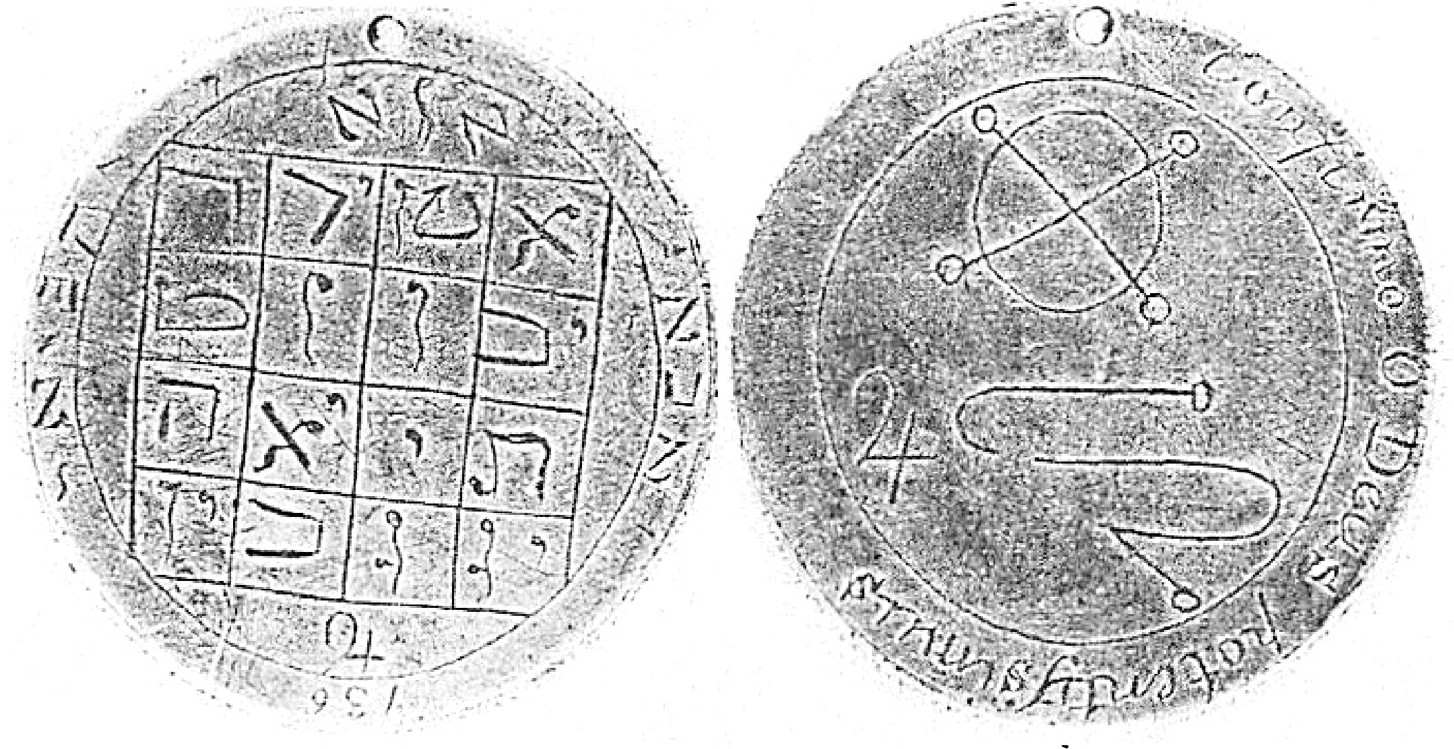
Front and back of Joseph Smith Jupiter Talisman

Masonic Dove Medallion owned by Joseph Smith

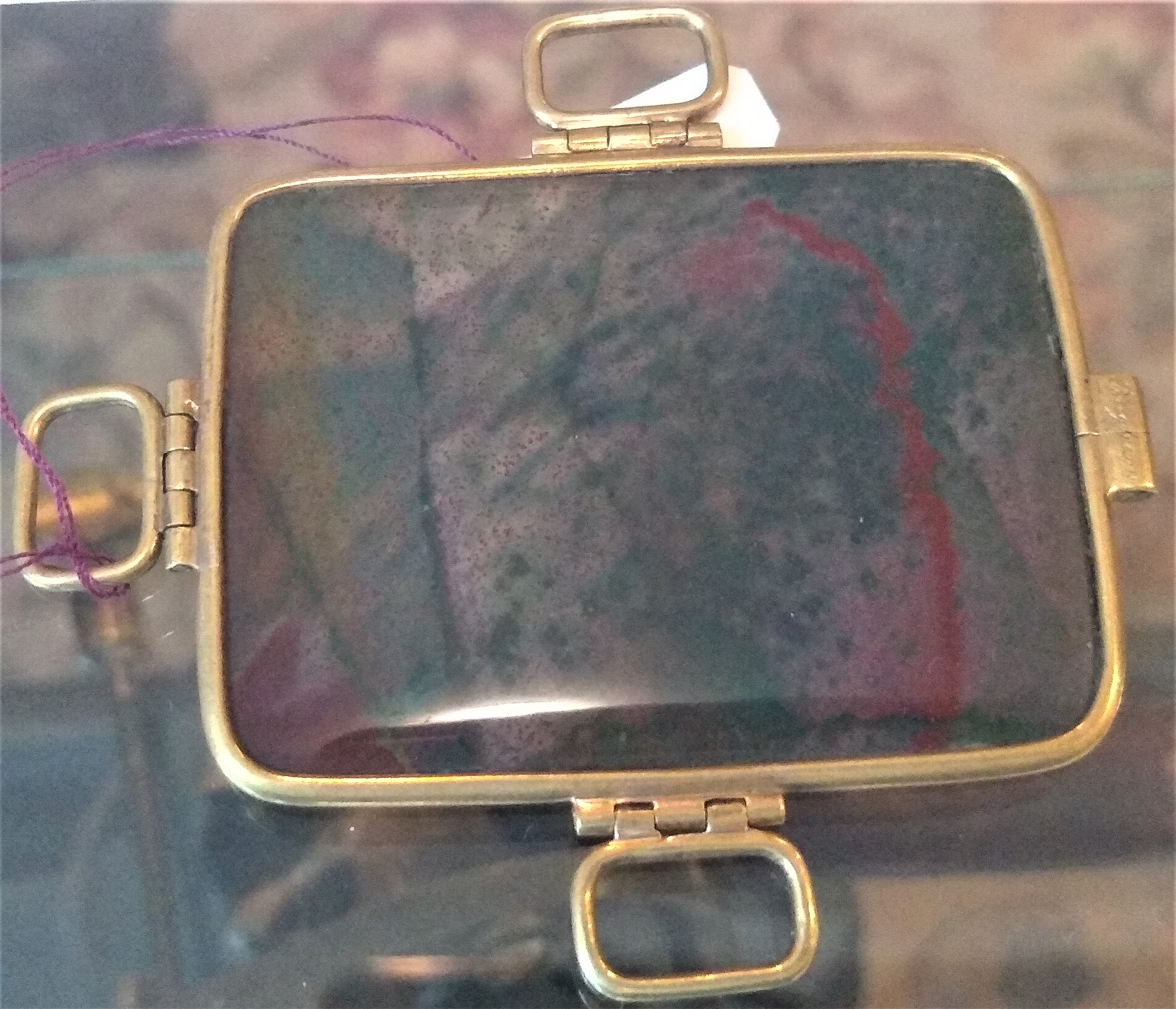
Bloodstone amulet worn by Brigham Young

Amulets, charms and talismans were part of the religious environment of the Smith family and other early Latter Day Saints.

Joseph Smith possessed a "Jupiter Talisman," a silver coin shaped device that would have been worn on Smith's body to grant "decisive victory over enemies, to defend against machinations, and to inspire the wearer thereof with the most remarkable confidence." The design of the talisman matches exactly those found in an 1801 grimoire titled The Magus. Family lore had it that Smith had it on his body the day of his martyrdom.

== Brigham Young ==
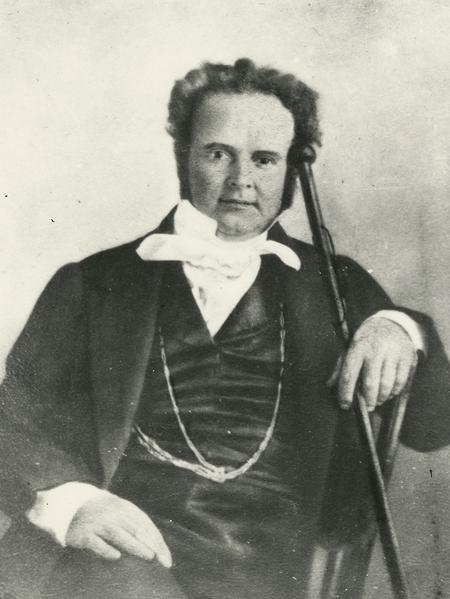
Willard Richards with his black cane

Purportedly, Brigham Young used Cowdery's rod to mark the site of the Salt Lake Temple. Apostle Anthon H. Lund wrote in his diary:

In the revelation to Oliver Cowdery in May 1829, Bro. [B. H.] Roberts said that the gift which the Lord says he has in his hand meant a stick which was like Aaron's Rod. It is said Bro. Phineas Young [brother-in-law of Oliver Cowdery and brother of Brigham Young] got it from him [Cowdery] and gave it to President Young who had it with him when he arrived in this [Salt Lake] valley and that it was with that stick that he pointed out where the Temple should be built.

Smith, and then later Brigham Young, also owned a silver "Masonic Dove Medallion," which is inscribed on the back "Fortitude Lodge No. 42." This masonic lodge was based out of New Brunswick, Canada, and it is unclear how it arrived into Smith's possession, as there are no known connections with that lodge and early Latter Day Saints. Additionally, a dove was not a common Masonic symbol in the early 1800s. The medallion was transferred to Brigham Young. Quinn speculates that the medallion could possibly be a charm associated with Venus, given the medallion is silver as prescribed in magic books and a dove is a symbol for Venus.

Brigham Young accepted the efficacy of seer stones, healing amulets and witches. Young had a bloodstone that according to his niece he wore around his neck on a chain for protection "when going into unknown or dangerous places."

== Astrology ==
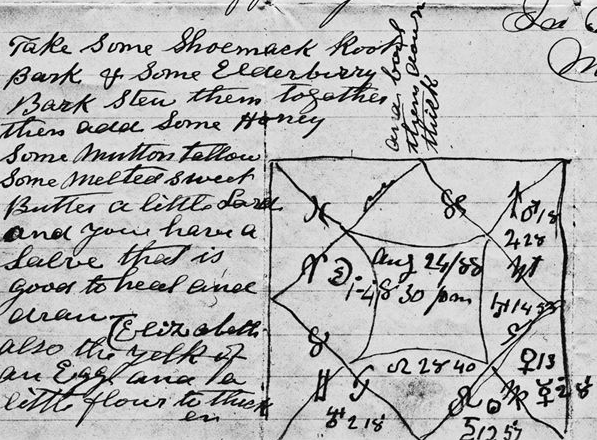
Astrological chart and healing remedy created by Steele for his grandchild's illness included in an August 20, 1888 letter.

Early Latter Day Saint movement members' views towards astrology ranged from acceptance to hostility, but were generally ambivalent, views reflected in the church's early leadership. For example, Orson Pratt condemned it, while William Clayton openly sought advice from astrologers into the 1860s. In 1852, Brigham Young gave his approval to a convert to study and begin practicing astrology, only to change his recommendation a year later, calling it "a dangerous thing to meddle with".

William W. Phelps published an almanac in Utah from 1851 to 1866. The first edition did not include the standard astrological information expected of almanacs, calling them "matters of ancient fancy". Later editions did, even while criticizing their effectiveness, an indication that there was a demand for it. Phelps wrote and spoke often against astrology, but by 1857, after Brigham Young told him that astrology was true, Phelps changed his mind, believing instead that astrology was "one of the sciences belonging to the holy Priesthood perverted by vain man." By 1861, Young himself seems to have changed his mind about the utility of astrology, telling an individual who wanted to start an astrology school that, "it would not do to favor Astrology." Joseph F. Smith and his wife Levira consulted an astrologer in 1860, however later in life Smith grew to view astrology as originating with the devil.

In 1868, the Salt Lake School of the Prophets decided that "Astrology was in opposition to the work of God. Hence saints should not be engaged in it," which was followed up with an article in the Deseret News decrying it. From that time on astrology has been considered an unacceptable practice.

One notable post-1868 exception was John Steele, who practiced astrology into the 20th century while in good standing with the church in Parowan and Toquerville, taking local leadership positions and eventually being called as a patriarch in 1903. Steele was an early pioneer and worked as the town's preeminent doctor. He was known for the way that he integrated medicine, magic, and astrology. He practiced according to the ideas of Samuel Thomson. One of Thomson's theories was that elimination of toxins was key to curing patients; calomel was sometimes used to induce vomiting. Because Steele's son Robert Henry was killed by calomel, Steele preferred Thomson's herbal medicines. He considered himself a veterinarian, using an herbal "horse taming" mixture, and was known for his ability to set broken bones. He was also known for using black magic to fix problems, and people in the town solicited him for horoscopes. He was called "Doc", and he was often seen wearing a blue cape with red lining.

== Coffin canes ==
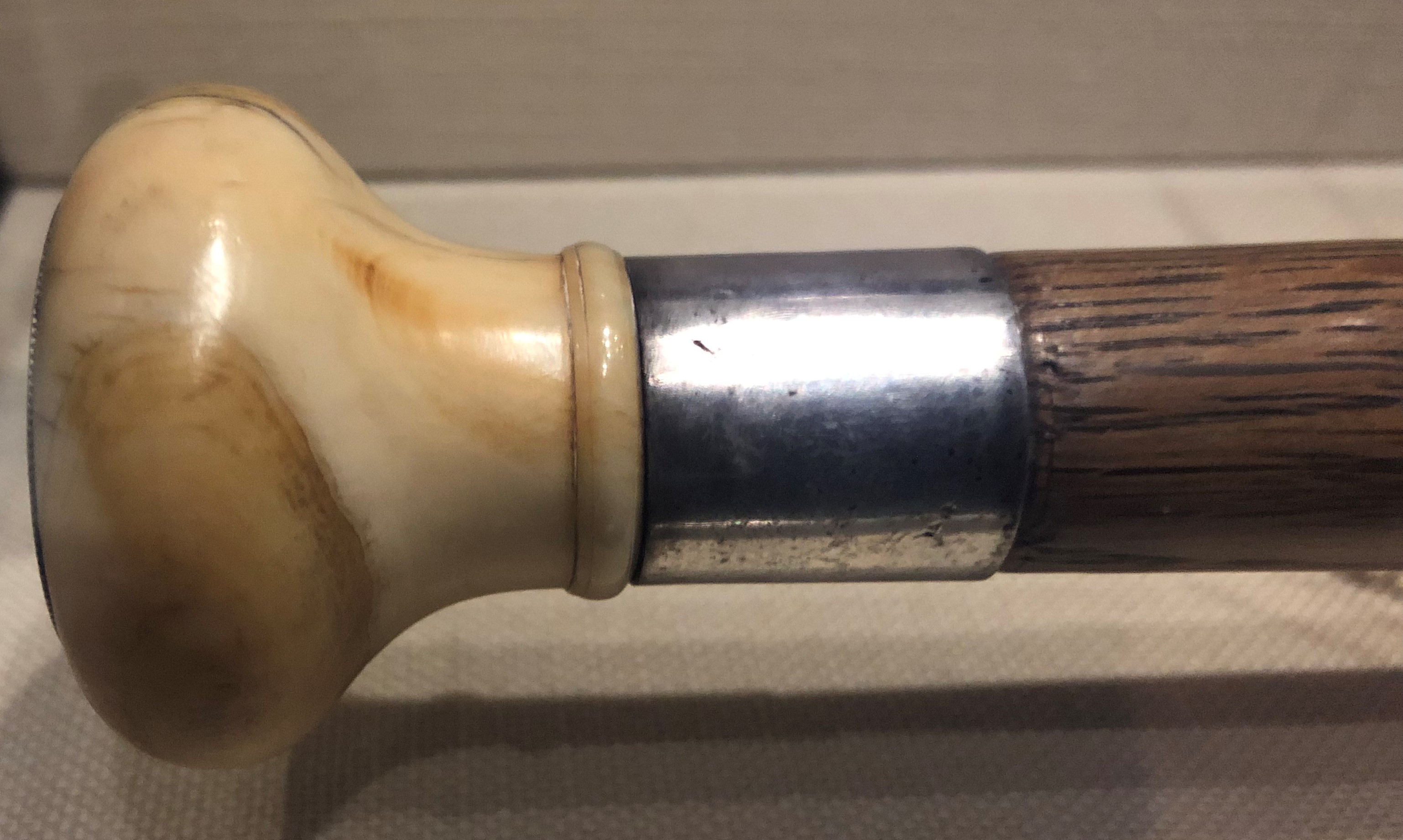
One of several canes made from the coffin used to carry Smith's body from Carthage to Nauvoo after he was killed. The ivory knob holds a lock of Smith's hair.

When Joseph and Hyrum were killed in 1844, the bloodstained wooden boxes used to transport the body of Joseph Smith was cut up into a number of canes. Smith's body was exhumed seven months later to a different burial site, and the coffin used for transport then was also made into canes. Some of the canes were made from leftover wood from the burial coffins. Owners of these canes included Brigham Young, Wilford Woodruff, Willard Snow, Perrigrine Sessions, Philo Dibble, James Bird, William S. Wadsworth, Heber C. Kimball, Lucius Scovil, Sidney Rigdon, and Dimick B. Huntington. Rigdon's was given to him after he had been excommunicated in 1845 in a magnanimous gesture by Brigham Young.

Various Latter Day Saints attested to the healing properties of these canes. In an 1857 sermon, Kimball stated that "the day will come when there will be multitudes who will be healed and blessed through the instrumentality of those canes, and the devil cannot overcome those who have them, in consequence of their faith and confidence in the virtues connected with them."

== See also ==
- Phrenology and the Latter Day Saint movement
- Salamander letter, a 20th century forgery
- The Magus (book)

== Notes ==
=== Works cited ===
- Brodie, Fawn M. (1971), No Man Knows My History, New York: Alfred A. Knopf, ISBN 0-6797-3054-0
- Bushman, Richard Lyman (2005). Joseph Smith: Rough Stone Rolling. New York: Alfred A. Knopf. ISBN 1-4000-4270-4.
- Harris, Martin (1859). "Mormonism—No. II". Tiffany's Monthly. 5 (4): 163–170.
- Howe, Eber Dudley (1834). Mormonism Unvailed: Or, A Faithful Account of that Singular Imposition and Delusion, from its Rise to the Present Time. Painesville, Ohio: Telegraph Press. OCLC 10395314.
- Lapham, La Fayette (1870). "Interview with the Father of Joseph Smith, the Mormon Prophet, Forty Years Ago. His Account of the Finding of the Sacred Plates". Historical Magazine. Second series. 7: 305–309.
- Mather, Frederic G. (1880). "Early Days of Mormonism". Lippincott's Magazine. 26 (152): 198–211.
- Ostling, Richard; Ostling, Joan K. (1999). Mormon America: The Power and the Promise. San Francisco: HarperSanFrancisco. ISBN 0-06-066371-5.
- Quinn, D. Michael (1998). Early Mormonism and the Magic World View (2nd ed.). Salt Lake City: Signature Books. ISBN 1-56085-089-2.
- Roberts, B. H., ed. (1930). A Comprehensive History of the Church of Jesus Christ of Latter-day Saints, Century I. Brigham Young University Press. ISBN 0-8425-0482-6.
- Shipps, Jan (1985). Mormonism: The Story of a New Religious Tradition. Chicago: University of Illinois Press. ISBN 0-252-01417-0.
- Smith, Joseph (July 1838a). "Editor's note". Elders' Journal of the Church of Jesus Christ of Latter Day Saints. 1 (3).
- Smith, Lucy Mack (1954). Preston Nibley (ed.). History of Joseph Smith. Salt Lake City: Bookcraft..
- Tucker, Pomeroy (1867). Origin, Rise and Progress of Mormonism. New York: D. Appleton.
- Vogel, Dan, ed. (1996). Early Mormon Documents. Vol. 1. Salt Lake City: Signature Books. ISBN 1-56085-072-8.
- Vogel, Dan (2004). Joseph Smith: The Making of a Prophet. Salt Lake City, UT: Signature Books. ISBN 1-56085-179-1.
