= Senator McKay =

Senator McKay may refer to:

- David McKay (politician) (1844–1917), Utah State Senate
- Douglas McKay (1893–1959), Oregon State Senate
- Gordon W. McKay (1910–1990), Oregon State Senate
- James Iver McKay (1793–1853), North Carolina State Senate
- John M. McKay (born 1948), Florida State Senate
- Mike McKay (politician) (born 1969), Maryland State Senate
- Thomas E. McKay (1875–1958), Utah State Senate

== See also ==
- Buddy MacKay (born 1933), Florida State Senate
