= Joseph Smith: The Making of a Prophet =

Book by Dan Vogel

- Author: Dan Vogel
- Subject: Joseph Smith
- Publisher: Signature Books
- Publication date: 2004
- Pages: 715 pp.
- ISBN: 978-1-56085-179-0
- OCLC: 54079485

Joseph Smith: The Making of a Prophet is a biography written by Dan Vogel that depicts the formative years of Joseph Smith, the founder of Mormonism. The book covers the period of Smith's life up until 1831. Vogel casts Smith in the role of a magician, who perhaps believes in his own ability to perform magic while using fraud to support his position: a charlatan that came to believe that he was called of God. The author assumes Smith to be the author of the Book of Mormon and takes the position that the book may be used as a "primary source document" that represents a reflection of Smith's own life. Events portrayed in the Book of Mormon are compared to specific events in Smith's life to illustrate similarities and to deduce Smith's thoughts and aspirations during these periods. Making of a Prophet won the Smith–Pettit Best Book Award from the John Whitmer Historical Association and the Best Biography Award from the Mormon History Association.

== Overview of the book ==
Vogel's stated purpose in the book is to integrate various pieces of information to explain Smith's complex personality, particularly the opposing perceptions that Smith was a “man of God” and a “fraud who exploited his followers for his own purposes.” The author proposes that Smith was a “pious deceiver” or “sincere fraud,” although the author states that he applies the term fraud when describing only some of Smith's activities. Vogel states that “Smith believed he was called of God, yet occasionally engaged in fraudulent activities to preach God’s word as effectively as possible.” The portrayal of Smith as actually being religious is contrasted with the irreligious portrayal of him presented by Fawn Brodie in her 1945 biography of Smith No Man Knows My History: The Life of Joseph Smith the Mormon Prophet. Vogel states that previous authors who have attempted to describe Smith's motives do not go far enough to "explore the inner moral conflicts of an individual who deceives in God’s name while holding sincere religious beliefs." The author states that "No biographer is completely free of bias. As is no doubt apparent, my inclination is to interpret any claim of the paranormal-precognition, clairvoyance, telekinesis, telepathy-as delusion or fraud." Regarding Smith's role as a prophet, the author states that Smith was not acting in a malicious or selfish manner, but instead was attempting to elevate others in order to elevate himself.

== Smith as a treasure seeker ==
Vogel states that he believes that the significance of treasure seeking in Smith's early life deserves greater emphasis than had been given in previous biographies, and presents Smith as "a leader among the treasure seers of Manchester, New York." Regarding these activities, Vogels suggests that "Smith was both convinced of his ability and also deceptive" and that "Smith may have believed himself to be inspired and may have at times heard voices or experienced visions but still used some deception to convince others." In order to support the thesis of Smith's primary focus in life being treasure hunting, the author makes extensive use of the Hurlbut affidavits originally published in E. D. Howe’s exposé Mormonism Unvailed and other early anti-Mormon publications.

== The Book of Mormon as a representation of Smith’s life ==
Vogel considers the Book of Mormon and Smith’s revelations as valid primary sources which may be used to deduce his state of mind, thoughts and dreams as a reflection of environmental and cultural influences. As such, The Making of a Prophet consistently draws parallels between Book of Mormon content and Smith's life. Some specific comparisons are as follows:

- The rivalry between Nephi and his older brothers Laman and Lemuel represents a rivalry between Smith and his brothers. The author states that although "neither Joseph nor his mother spoke of this rivalry," the description of sibling rivalry as a theme in the Book of Mormon makes the possibility of such a rivalry "impossible to ignore."
- The incident in which Nephi breaks his steel bow and subsequently successfully locates food (1 Nephi 16:18-23) is stated to be a fantasy that Smith might have had in his own thoughts.
- The abduction of the Lamanites daughters by the wicked priests of King Noah (Mosiah 20:1-5) is said to represent Smith's elopement with his wife Emma.
- Abinadi's absence from King Noah's domain for two years is said to represent Smith's absence from Harmony, Pennsylvania.
- Jacob's criticism of the Nephites for having multiple wives (Jacob 2:31-35) is said to represent Smith criticizing his father, whom the author speculates was unfaithful.
- Amalikiah's poisoning of Lehonti in order to become the king of the Lamanites (Alma 47:18) is suggested to represent the death of Smith's older brother Alvin, whom the author speculates died of poisoning.

In a monograph analyzing the Book of Mormon's literary elements, literature scholar Grant Hardy has criticized this approach to the Book of Mormon as "relentlessly reductive" because it does not take the book's content and figures seriously "even as literary constructions."

== Reception ==
=== Awards ===
In September 2004, the John Whitmer Historical Association granted its Smith-Pettit Best Book award to Making of a Prophet. Vogel also received the Mormon History Association's Best Biography Award for Making of a Prophet in May 2005.

=== Latter-day Saint responses ===
Response to the book from reviewers who are members of the Church of Jesus Christ of Latter-day Saints (LDS Church), the largest of the denominations that trace foundings to Smith, focused on the author's methods of defining which source documents deserved consideration. Reviewers from the LDS Church sponsored Foundation for Ancient Research and Mormon Studies (FARMS) argue that the author preferred late, second and third-hand sources over eyewitness sources, and that Smith's own words were rarely used.

The author, in a detailed answer to the FARMS reviews, acknowledged that he presented his own version of Joseph Smith, just as other authors have presented their versions of Smith. Using the Lorenzo Saunders interview as an example, Vogel responded to the criticism by explaining his use of such sources "was selective and limited to the most reliable parts of his testimony."
