= No, Ma'am, That's Not History =

1946 book on Mormonism by Hugh Nibley

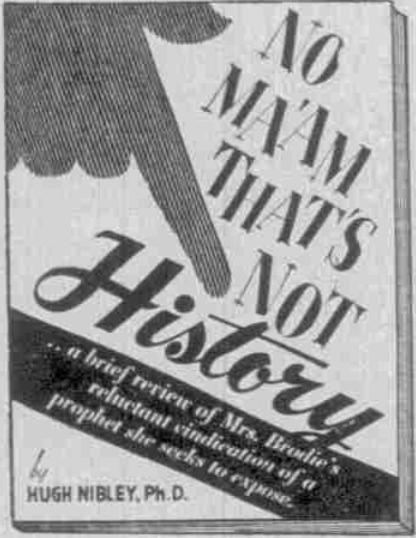
- First edition cover
- Author: Hugh Nibley
- Language: English
- Subject: Mormon studies
- Genre: Apologetics
- Publisher: Bookcraft
- Publication date: 1946
- Publication place: United States
- Media type: Print
- Pages: 62
- OCLC: 4388256
- LC Class: BX8670.2 .B76 N42

No, Ma'am, That's Not History is a short work written by Hugh Nibley to criticize Fawn M. Brodie's biography of Joseph Smith, No Man Knows My History. Nibley accuses Brodie of inconsistency and improper historical methodology. Scholars have criticized No, Ma'am for using the same kind of hyperbole that Nibley critiques in Brodie. Nibley's defenders explain that his acerbic satire does use similar rhetorical tools as Brodie does, which is part of its attention-grabbing intent. In 1999, The Salt Lake Tribune said the book "was wildly popular in Utah".

== Background ==
Fawn Brodie's No Man Knows My History: The Life of Joseph Smith (1945) had a mixed reception when it was first published. Contemporary newspapers praised it as a definitive biography. In 1971, Marvin S. Hill wrote that the biography had long been considered "the standard work on the life of Joseph Smith." Former Latter-day Saint and novelist Vardis Fisher wrote in 1945 that her work was an "excellent analysis" but her proposal that Smith was a self-interested fraud was pursued overzealously. Latter-day Saint scholars, including Nibley, severely criticized the book. No, Ma'am, That's Not History: A Brief Review of Mrs. Brodie's Reluctant Vindication of a Prophet She Seeks to Expose was published as a 62-page monograph published in 1946. Nibley wrote No, Ma'am as a personal project. The work was reissued in 1959 as a pamphlet. Nibley was highly educated in classical history and rhetoric. He did not specialize in American or Mormon history. Nibley later wrote extensively about the "oriental" parallels of the Book of Mormon that he mentioned as an aside in No, Ma'am.

== Summary ==
Nibley accused Brodie of cherry-picking her arguments. In the case of the testimonies of Smith's neighbors, Nibley wrote that Brodie accepts their courtroom testimonies only when it suits her argument. Nibley described Brodie as misusing historical parallels and claimed that there were far better parallels to the Book of Mormon in "Oriental literature".

Nibley criticized Brodie's description of Joseph Smith. He wrote that in her view, "Joseph Smith was a complete imposter... but he meant well." This was worse than a blatantly anti-Mormon view that Joseph Smith was totally depraved, because it was "more plausible". Nibley wrote that "no blundering, dreaming, undisciplined, shallow and opportunistic fakir could have left behind what Joseph Smith did, both in men's hearts and on paper." The proof that Brodie claimed for Joseph Smith's purported later fabrication of the First Vision relied on an "argument of silence" – that newspapers had not mentioned Smith's First Vision. Nibley argued that since Joseph Smith was an obscure farm boy, that it was unconvincing to expect newspapers to mention his experience at the time. He also wrote that things "of a transcendent and 'soul-shattering nature'" are not typically reported to the press. He presented many counter-arguments to Brodie's arguments, using logic to show inconsistency or casting doubt on her sources. He also criticized her psychohistorical method, stating that historians cannot know what hidden emotions Joseph or Emma Smith felt unless they have a source that says so.

== Reception ==
No, Ma'am positioned Nibley as a defender of the historicity of the Book of Mormon, impressing general authorities in the LDS Church. The Salt Lake Tribune reports that it became "wildly popular" in Utah. Outside the church, historians were not impressed with No, Ma'am. Dale Morgan, a historian who helped Brodie while she wrote the biography, found Nibley "intoxicated with his own language". Stanley S. Ivins, a critic of the Church's polygamy practices, criticized No, Ma'am for misrepresenting Brodie and Church history. Juanita Brooks stated that Nibley's zeal caused him to "make some statements almost as far fetched as [Brodie's]." In a letter to her parents, Brodie wrote that Nibley's critique was "a flippant and shallow piece". She further stated "If that [Nibley's critique] is the best a young Mormon historian can offer, then I am all the certain that the death of B. H. Roberts meant the end of all that was truly scholarly and honest in orthodox Mormon historiography."

Later scholars expressed both criticism and admiration for No, Ma'am. Writing in 1989, Mormon historian Newell G. Bringhurst states that Nibley "made some rather extreme statements of his own"; for example: "The gospel as the Mormons know it sprang full-grown from the words of Joseph Smith. It has never been worked over or touched up in any way, and is free of revisions and alterations." In his analysis of Nibley's treatment of Joseph Smith, Richard Bushman notices that No, Ma'am does not defend Joseph Smith's character, but rather, attacks Brodie's "scholarship and reasoning". Bushman said that the tract, oft-criticized for its sarcasm, was "a pleasure for me to discover on rereading it how on the mark it was." In David J. Whittaker's 1991 forward to Nibley's collected apologetic works, he described Nibley's approach in his apologetic work as "biting satire" which "invokes some of the critics' own rhetorical standbys, such as ridicule and caricature" that is sometimes "dismissed as flippant". Whittaker explained that Nibley focused on published criticism, and that many manuscript sources have since become available from the Church History Library and correct Nibley's arguments. These manuscript sources show the various accounts of Joseph Smith's first vision, and his involvement in money digging, including his trial in 1826.

According to Ronald Helfrich, author of Mormon Studies: A Critical History, No, Ma'am was "a turning point in the history of Mormon apologetics and polemics" because it used academic language in its arguments. Nibley's patronizing language, Helfrich posited, could be a reflection of Nibley's own "patriarchalism and paternalism". Nibley's rhetorical style became popular with defenders of the church. In 1979, Foundation for Ancient Research and Mormon Studies (FARMS) was founded and published "Nibley-style apologetics and polemics". The organization published FARMS Review from 1989 until 2011. FARMS Review describes itself as helping readers to "make informed choices and judgements" about books in Mormon studies. Daniel Peterson, a BYU professor of Islamic studies, a former chairman of the board at FARMS, and a writer who followed in Nibley's apologetic tradition, called Nibley "the foremost apologist for Mormonism" during the latter half of the 20th century. Peterson described Nibley's approach to apologetics as an attitude that "the best defense is a good offense." FARMS Review contained a review that Ron Priddis, who was the managing editor of Signature Books, an independent Mormon publishing house, called "tabloid scholarship". Signature Books published An Insider's View of Mormon Origins by Grant Palmer, a former LDS institute director; FARMS Review published five negative reviews of the book. In the book, Palmer discussed naturalistic explanations for Joseph Smith's production of scripture, including the Book of Mormon, as well as issues surrounding genetics and the Book of Mormon. In Davis Bitton's review in FARMS Review, he wondered how often Palmer attended church. Priddis called this "innuendo and character assassination" inappropriate for the venue of a scholarly review.
