= Luman Walters =

American occultist and treasure-seeker

- Born: c. 1789
- Died: June 2, 1860
- Other name: 'Laman Walter'

Luman Walters (c. 1789 – June 2, 1860) is known for his connection with the family of Joseph Smith, the founder of the Latter Day Saint movement.

== Early life ==
Luman Walters was born in Winchester, Litchfield County, Connecticut, to John Walter and Sarah Gleason around 1789. Sometime between 1798 and 1800, the Walter family relocated to Burke, Vermont, a town founded by Luman's uncle.

Walters was reportedly the "son of a rich man living on the Hudson [River] South of Albany [New York]". He had "received a scientific education" and studied in Paris. Alva Beaman's daughter recalled that "After he came home he lived like a misanthrope. He had come back an infidel, believing neither in man nor God."

At a debate in the 1880s, Clark Braden alleged that Walters had mastered the arts of animal magnetism and Mesmerism.

Walters had returned to the United States by 1818 and began acting the part of a physician and occult expert. In that year, James Giddings, the deputy sheriff of Boscawen, New Hampshire, offered a reward for the arrest of a "transient person, calling himself Laman Walter, [who] has for several days past been imposing himself upon the credulity of the people in this vicinity by a pretended knowledge of magic, palmistry and conjuration". Walters was arrested for "juggling" that August in Hopkinton, New Hampshire, but escaped from jail.

In November 1819, Walters married Harriet Howard in Vermont. By 1822, Walters had apparently taken up residence in Gorham, Ontario County, New York.

== In Mormonism ==
In 1822 and 1823, Walters served as a seer for a treasure dig on the property of Abner Cole in Palmyra, Wayne County, New York. Joseph Smith, Sr., Alvin Smith, and Joseph Smith reportedly participated in this dig. Walters possessed a magical book and a seer stone, which he used to locate buried treasure.

Beaman's daughter recalled that Walters was "a sort of fortune teller" who had been "sent for three times ... to dig for treasure". Reportedly, Walters "pointed out Joseph Smith, who was sitting quietly among a group of men in the tavern, and said, 'There was the young man that could find [the treasure]', and cursed and swore about him in a scientific manner: awful!"

Mormon historian D. Michael Quinn has argued that Walters crafted the magical parchments owned by the Smith family, and Quinn theorizes that the young Joseph Smith looked to Walters as an occult mentor.

According to non-Mormon Pomeroy Tucker, Walters was an early believer in Joseph Smith's "money-digging or golden bible finding pretensions", although official church histories do not record Luman Walter's membership in the Church of Christ. It is unclear if Luman Walters followed the group when they relocated to Kirtland, Ohio. Quinn cites a family history which lists Luman Walters as a "clairvoyant who moved to Ohio".

Walter's second cousin, George Walters, did become a Mormon. Dorothy Walters is listed on the rolls of the first Relief Society in Nauvoo, Illinois. Her husband, Benjamin Hoyt, was ordered by his bishop to cease using a divining rod, calling other people wizards and witches, and "burning boards" to heal the bewitched. This decision was upheld by the church's high council, with Hyrum Smith presiding.

=== Abner Cole's account ===
Abner Cole, a newspaper editor by profession, printed a parody of the Book of Mormon, the "Book of Pukei", in his Palmyra paper The Reflector in 1830. This parody described the role of "Walters the Magician" in these treasure digs, who "sacrificed a Cock for the purpose of propitiating the prince of spirits .... And he took his book, and his rusty sword, and his magic stone, and his stuffed Toad, and all his implements of witchcraft and retired to the mountains near Great Sodus Bay". Cole also surmised that Joseph Smith worked under the inspiration of "Walters the Magician."

Abner Cole's non-satirical account, published in the February 28, 1831, Reflector, mentions "a vagabond fortune-teller by the name of Walters, who [...] was once committed to the jail of this country for juggling, was the constant companion and bosom friend of these money digging impostors."

Cole proposes "Walters [...] first suggested to Smith the idea of finding a book." According to Cole, Walters would read, in Latin, from Cicero's Orations, "to his credulous hearers, uttering at the same time an unintelligible jargon, which he would afterwards pretend to interpret and explain, as a record of the former inhabitants of America"

Cole recalls nights where Walters led a band of treasure hunters, "and drawing a circle around laborers, with the point of an old rusty sword" and "sacricides a fowl" to "the guardian of hidden wealth." Cole recalls that the dig ended in disappointment."

=== Artemisia Beaman Snow account ===
Artemisia Beaman was the daughter of Alva Beaman. In the early 1870s, she recalled Walters as the son of a rich man who had been given "a scientific education" which included being sent to Paris. She recalled that Walters was "a misanthrope... an infidel, believing neither in man nor god". According to Beaman, Walters was "a sort of fortune teller". Beaman recalled:

For instance, a man I knew rode up, and before he spoke, the fortune teller said, “You needn’t get off your horse, I know what you want. Your mare ain’t stolen.”
Says the man 'How do you know what I want?'
Says he, “I’ll give you a sign. You’ve got a respectable wife, and so many children. At this minute your wife has just drawn a bucket of water at the well to wash her dishes. Look at your watch and find out if it ain’t so when you get home. As to your mare, she’s not a dozen miles from home. She strayed into such neighborhood, and as they didn’t know whose she was they put her up till she should be claimed. My fee’s a dollar. Be off!”

According to Beaman, Walters "was sent for three times to go to the hill Cumorah". Says Beaman: "Each time he said there was treasure there, but that he couldn’t get it; though there was one that could. The last time he came he pointed out Joseph Smith, who was sitting quietly among a group of men in the tavern, and said There was the young man that could find it, and cursed and swore about him in a scientific manner: awful!”

=== Lucy Mack Smith's 'conjuror' ===
Lucy Mack Smith, Joseph's mother, recalled a conjuror who tried to find the plates:

"My husband soon learned that ten or twelve men were clubbed together, with one Willard Chase, a Methodist class leader, at their head. And what was still more ridiculous, they had sent sixty or seventy miles for a certain conjurer to come and divine the place where the plates were secreted.

The next morning my husband concluded to go among the neighbors to see what he could learn with regard to their plans. The first house he came to he found the conjuror and Willard Chase, together with the rest of the clan. Making an errand, he sat down near the door, leaving it a little ajar. They stood in the yard near the door and were devising plans to find 'Joe Smith's gold Bible.' The conjuror was much animated, though he had traveled sixty miles the previous day and night.

Presently the woman of the house became uneasy at the exposures they were making and, stepping through a back door, called in a suppressed tone loud enough to be heard by Mr. Smith, "Sam, Sam, you are cutting your own throat."

At this the conjuror bawled out at the top of his voice, "I am not afraid of anybody—we will have them plates in spite of Joe Smith or all the devils in hell."

=== Brigham Young's 'fortune-teller' ===
It has been suggested that Walters might be the 'fortune-teller' whom Brigham Young referred to on multiple occasions in the 1850s.

In 1850, Young told the General Conference "I remember once at the commencement of the church a necromancer embraced it but he could not be satisfied; he came and said he had fingered and handled the perverted priesthood so much, the course I have taken is downwards; the devil has too fast hold of me, I cannot go with you."

The Journal of Discourses records an 1855 speech by Young in which he again spoke of a man who "was a fortune-teller, necromancer, an astrologer, a soothsayer and possessed as much talent as any man that walked on the American soil, and was one of the wickedest men I ever saw." Young recalled the fortune-teller sought the golden plates and "rode over sixty miles three times the same season they were obtained by Joseph Smith." Young recalled that "a Baptist deacon and others of Joseph's neighbors were the very men who sent for this necromancer the last time he went for the treasure." Young recalls that "When Joseph obtained the treasure, the priests the deacons and religionists of every grade, went hand in hand with the fortune-teller, and with every wicked person, to get it out of his hand, and to accomplish this, a part of them came out and persecuted him".

Young also recalled that he had "never heard a man who could swear like that astrologer; he swore scientifically, by rule, by note. To those who love swearing, it was musical to hear him,"

Young also spoke of the fortune-teller in 1857:

"I never heard such oaths fall from the lips of any man as I heard uttered by a man who was called a fortune teller, and who knew where those plates were hid. He went three times in one summer to get them, —the same summer in which Joseph did get them. Baptist, Presbyterian, and Methodist priests and deacons sent for him to tell where those plates were, and to get them out of the hill where they were deposited; and he had not returned to his home from the last trip he made for them more than a week or ten days before Joseph got them. Joseph was what we call an ignorant boy, but this fortune teller whose name I do not remember was a man of profound learning. He had put himself in possession of all the learning in the States, —had been to France, Germany, Italy, and through the world, —had been educated for a priest and turned out to be a devil. [...] I never heard a man swear as he did. He could tell that those plates were there, and that they were a treasure whose value to the people could not be told; for that I myself heard him say."

Historian Dale Morgan stated that he "no longer believe[d] that the conjuror Brigham Young tells of was Walters." In contrast, Quinn argues that Walters is Young's "fortune-teller", noting that both Cole and Beman refer to Walters as a "fortune-teller" and that Beman makes special mention of Walters' habit of swearing, not unlike Young's fortune-teller.

== Later life ==
In 1829, Luman W. Walters was listed as a "defaulted debtor" in a Sodus civil case brought by Thomas Judgson.

The 1830 census lists a Luman Walters in Sodus Township, New York, with a wife and five children. In 1834 Walter purchased property in Gorham, New York, and he appears on the census rolls there in 1840.

A document by Diedrich Willers Jr. (1820–1908) of Fayette reads: "Fortune tellers are consulted as to the future, many in this neighborhood where ever they wish to find out something which is lost or pry into hidden mysteries will consult Dr Walters".

Walters died on June 2, 1860, at the age of 72. His obituary described him as "an eccentric but somewhat successful practitioner in the medical profession".
