= Book of Pukei =

1830 satire of the Book of Mormon

The "Book of Pukei" is the earliest satire of the Book of Mormon. It was published in June and July 1830 by Abner Cole (under the pseudonym Obadiah Dogberry Esq.) in the Palmyra, New York newspaper The Reflector.

== Synopsis ==
The first of two chapters deals with a character named "Walters the Magician", historically identified as Luman Walters, a treasure seeker and early convert to Smith's church.

Chapter 1 begins:

And it came to pass in the latter days, that wickedness did much abound, and the "Idle and slothful said one to another, let us send for Walters the Magician, who has strange books, and deals with familiar spirits; peradventure he will inform us where the Nephites, hid their treasure, so be it, that we and our vagabond van, do not perish for lack of sustenance".

Walters is described as "producing an old book in an unknown tongue, (Cicero's Orations in Latin,) from whence he read in the presence of the Idle and Slothful strange stories of hidden treasures and of the spirit who had custody thereof." The text describes Walters as leading treasure seeking adventures:

The Magician led the rabble unto a dark grove, in a place called Manchester, where after drawing a Magic circle, with a rusty sword, and collecting his motley crew of latter-demallions, within the centre, he sacrificed a Cock (a bird sacred to Minerva) for the purpose of propiciating the prince of spirits.

The treasure-seekers grow disillusioned, upon which "Walters the Magician [...] was sorely grieved, and said unto himself, lo! mine occupation is gone, even these ignorant vagabonds, the idle and slothful detect mine impostures. I will away and hide myself, lest the strong arm of the law should bring me to justice." Walters thus "took his book, and his rusty sword, and his magic stone, and his stuffed Toad, and all his implements of witchcraft and retired to the mountains near Great Sodus Bay".

Chapter 2 begins: "And it came to pass, that when the mantle of Walters the Magician had fallen upon Joseph, sirnamed the prophet, who was the son of Joseph;". The story of the guardian spirit is satirically described:

I looked, and behold a little old man stood before me, clad, as I supposed, in Egyptian raiment, except his Indian blanket, and moccasins—his beard of silver white, hung far below his knees. On his head was an old fashioned military half cocked hat, such as was worn in the days of the patriarch Moses—his speech was sweeter than molasses, and his words were the reformed Egyptian.

The "spirit" tells Joseph that "thou art chosen to interpret the book, which Mormon has written, to wit, the gold Bible". The spirit promises to give Joseph a breast plate and "an assistant, even Oliver, the pedagogue", a reference to Book of Mormon scribe Oliver Cowdery.
