= Thomas E. McKay =

American politician (1875–1958)

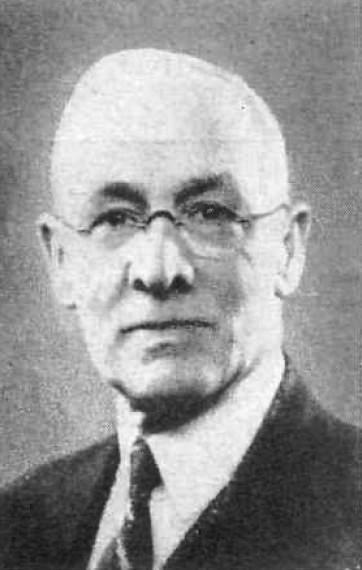
- McKay in 1952

Assistant to the Quorum of the Twelve Apostles
- April 6, 1941 – January 15, 1958

14th Utah Senate

In office
- 1921 – 1923

13th Utah House of Representatives

In office
- 1919 – 1921

Personal details
- Born: Thomas Evans McKay; October 29, 1875; Huntsville, Utah Territory, U.S.
- Died: January 15, 1958 (aged 82); Salt Lake City, Utah, U.S.
- Resting place: Huntsville Cemetery; 41°15′52.92″N 111°48′3.96″W
- Spouse(s): Fawn Brimhall
- Children: Flora J. Crawford; Fawn M. Brodie; Thomas B. McKay; Barbara Smith; Louisa Card; Amelia Lehnerd
- Parents: David McKay; Jennette Evans
- Relatives: David O. McKay (brother)

Thomas Evans McKay (October 29, 1875 – January 15, 1958) was a Utah politician and farmer and was a general authority of the Church of Jesus Christ of Latter-day Saints (LDS Church) from 1941 until his death.

McKay was born in Huntsville, Utah Territory, the son of David McKay and Jennette Evans. McKay's older brother was David O. McKay, who would become the ninth president of the LDS Church.

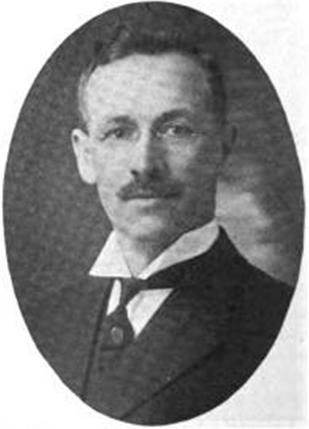
McKay ca 1920

After graduating from the University of Utah in 1899, McKay traveled to Switzerland and Germany as an LDS Church missionary. During his mission, he was president of the Frankfurt Conference of the church for three months.

After returning to Utah, McKay taught at the Weber Academy and the Agricultural College of Utah. Later he became the superintendent of the Weber County schools.

From 1909 to 1912, McKay returned to Europe as the president of the church's Swiss–German Mission. He also was the mission president of the Swiss–Austrian Mission from 1927 until the Anschluss in 1938. During the Second World War, McKay was, in theory, the mission president over all German-speaking areas of Europe, although he resided in Salt Lake City at the time.

In 1918, McKay was elected to the Utah House of Representatives as the representative for Weber County. He served one term, in the 13th Utah State Legislature which met from 1919 to 1921. McKay then served in the Utah Senate in 1921 and 1923

Prior to his call as a general authority, McKay was a president of the Ogden Stake of the church. In 1941, he became one of the first five men appointed to the newly created position of Assistant to the Quorum of the Twelve Apostles. In 1951, he witnessed his brother's promotion to the presidency of the church. Thomas E. McKay served as an Assistant to the Twelve until his death in Salt Lake City at the age of 82.

McKay was married to Fawn Brimhall and was the father of five children. McKay's daughter, Fawn M. Brodie, was a biographer and professor of history at UCLA who was eventually excommunicated for portraying Joseph Smith as a fraudulent genius in her 1945 work No Man Knows My History.

== See also ==
- Marion G. Romney
- Nicholas G. Smith
