= No Man Knows My History =

1945 book by Fawn M. Brodie

No Man Knows My History: The Life of Joseph Smith
- Cover of the first edition
- Author: Fawn McKay Brodie
- Language: English
- Publisher: Alfred A. Knopf
- Publication date: 1945; revised ed. 1971
- Publication place: United States
- Media type: Print
- Pages: 576 (1971 ed.)
- ISBN: 978-0-679-73054-5
- OCLC: 36510049
- Dewey Decimal: 289.3/092 B 20
- LC Class: BX8695.S6 B7 1995

No Man Knows My History: The Life of Joseph Smith is a 1945 book by Fawn M. Brodie that was one of the first significant non-hagiographic biographies of Joseph Smith, the progenitor of the Latter Day Saint movement. No Man Knows My History was influential in the development of Mormon history as a scholarly field.

No Man Knows My History has never been out of print, and 60 years after its first publication, its publisher, Alfred A. Knopf, continues to sell about a thousand copies annually. For a revised edition released in 1971, Brodie added a supplement incorporating psychohistorical commentary. In 1995, Utah State University (USU) marked the 50th anniversary of the book's first publication by hosting a symposium to re-examine the book, its author, and her methods, and in 1996 USU published the symposium papers as a book of essays.

== Background ==
Fawn M. Brodie was born in 1915 into a respected, if impoverished, Latter-day Saint family. Brodie drifted away from religion during her graduate studies in literature at the University of Chicago. Having found temporary employment at the Harper Library, Brodie began researching the origins of Mormonism as a biographical study of Joseph Smith. The writing of the biography was slowed by the birth of her first child and by three rapid moves to follow her husband's career, but in 1943, Brodie entered a 300-page draft of her book in a contest for the Alfred A. Knopf literary fellowship; in May, the publisher judged her application to be the best of the 44 entries.

Other scholars of Mormonism enlarged and critiqued Brodie's research, most notably Dale Morgan, who became a lifelong friend, mentor, and sounding board. Brodie finally completed her biography of Smith in 1944, and Knopf published it in 1945, when Brodie was 30 years old.

== Perspective on Smith ==
In No Man Knows My History, Brodie presented the young Smith as a good-natured, lazy, extroverted, and unsuccessful treasure seeker, who, in an attempt to improve his family's fortunes, first developed the notion of golden plates and then the concept of a religious novel, the Book of Mormon. This book, she asserts, was based in part on an earlier work, View of the Hebrews, by a contemporary clergyman, Ethan Smith (no relation). While previous "naturalistic approaches to Joseph's visions had explained them through psychological analysis", regarding Smith as honest but deluded, Brodie instead interpreted him as having been deliberately deceptive. In No Man Knows My History, Brodie depicts Smith as having been a deliberate impostor, who at some point, in nearly untraceable steps, became convinced that he was indeed a prophet—though without ever escaping "the memory of the conscious artifice" that created the Book of Mormon. Jan Shipps, a preeminent non-LDS scholar of Mormonism who rejects this theory, nevertheless called No Man Knows My History a "beautifully written biography [...] the work of a mature scholar [that] represented the first genuine effort to come to grips with the contradictory evidence about Smith's early life."

Although Brodie's analysis of Smith has sometimes been termed psychobiography or psychohistory, she did not gain a reputation as a psychohistorian until later in life, and she denied the presence of psychohistory in No Man Knows My History "except by inadvertence." In 1971, Brodie added a supplement to the book that engaged more directly—though still somewhat sparingly—in psychoanalysis, revising her earlier portrayal of Smith from a deliberate charlatan to a conflicted person torn by unconscious internal dissonance in a "personality disorder" that nevertheless defied clinical models.

== Reception ==
=== Prominence ===
Upon its publication, Dale Morgan called Brodie's first book the "finest job of scholarship yet done in Mormon history and perhaps the outstanding biography in several years—a book distinguished in the range and originality of its research, the informed and searching objectivity of its viewpoint, the richness and suppleness of its prose, and its narrative power." For decades afterward, No Man Knows My History enjoyed broad acceptance. In 1971, Latter-day Saint historian Marvin S. Hill observed that at the time, "most professional American historians" regarded the book "as the standard work on the life of Joseph Smith." By 1995, although four other book-length studies of Joseph Smith had been produced, none achieved as much prominence as No Man Knows My History.

In 1995, Utah State University sponsored a symposium to commemorate the 50th anniversary of the publication of No Man Knows My History during which scholars reflected on the book's contributions to Mormon studies.

In his 2005 biography of Smith titled Joseph Smith: Rough Stone Rolling, Richard Bushman noted that at that time Brodie's "biography was acknowledged by non-Mormon scholars as the premier study of Joseph Smith," and he called Brodie "the most eminent of Joseph Smith's unbelieving biographers." In 2007, Bushman observed Knopf still sold about a thousand copies of No Man Knows My History annually and noted Brodie had "shaped the view of the Prophet for half a century. Nothing we have written has challenged her domination. I had hoped my book would displace hers, but at best it will only be a contender in the ring, whereas before she reigned unchallenged." However, historian Laurie Maffly-Kipp, who is not Mormon, believed the influence of No Man Knows My History was waning, as while it had been "the 'go to' book on Smith's life" for "most historians", Rough Stone Rolling displaced it as a "definitive account" of Smith.

=== Criticism ===
Upon its 1945 release, one of the book's earliest critics was Vardis Fisher, a prolific novelist and former Latter-day Saint. In his review for the New York Times, Fisher approved of Brodie's "painstaking" work and praised her "excellent analysis of the early appeal of Mormonism," but he was unconvinced of Brodie's theory that Smith was a self-interested fraud and accused her of pursuing the idea overzealously, writing, "she has a thesis, and she rides it hard." Fisher also criticized Brodie's willingness to "give the content of a mind or to explain motives which at best can only be surmised," making No Man Knows My History "almost more a novel than a biography."

Historian Marvin S. Hill criticized the book on several fronts, including its portrayal of Smith as lacking religious motivations. Hill stated that Brodie's characterization of people's interest in and conversion to Mormonism as being the result of Smith's charisma and a conjectured "unconscious but positive talent at hypnosis" neglected the broader religious context of nineteenth-century America, and that it fails to account for Mormons who converted or stayed committed in Smith's absence. Hill hypothesized that "general cynicism toward religion among many intellectuals" in the 1940s may have prompted Brodie's characterization of Smith. He also criticized Brodie's handling of primary sources, stating that she references Smith's official history as if it is a primary source written or dictated by him, but that most of Smith's official history was actually adapted from other sources, such as the diaries of George A. Smith and Willard Richards, and only rendered by scribes as if it were in Smith's first-person voice.

Scholars also echoed Fisher's critique of No Man Knows My History's reliance on unsourced and speculative depictions of historical figures' inner thoughts. Although Brodie's literary style invited readers to identify with people portrayed in the book, critics said it relied on guesswork and sometimes outright invention of what someone may have been thinking or feeling. According to psychologist Charles Cohen, this approach "undercut the history." Cohen stated that Brodie's use of psychoanalysis in her 1971 supplement was incomplete and inconsistent with the lack of evidence supporting Smith having a tumultuous childhood.

D. Michael Quinn assessed No Man Knows My History as "deeply flawed in its research, in its unrelenting distaste for Joseph Smith, and in its interpretative framework," but went on to write that Brodie "demonstrated [Smith's] complex personality, identified crucial issues, asked significant questions, gave previously unavailable information, and wrote with stellar prose."

In No Man Knows My History, Brodie hypothesized that Smith had fathered five children through polygamous relationships: Oliver Buell, Orson Washington Hyde, Frank Henry Hyde, John Reed Hancock, and Moroni Pratt. In the 2000s, the Sorenson Molecular Genealogy Foundation, using Y-DNA testing, excluded Smith as the father of Buell, Hancock, and Pratt. Frank Henry Hyde's recorded date of birth precludes Smith's paternity, and whether or not Smith fathered Orson Washington Hyde has neither been proved nor disproved.

=== Influence ===
The significance and ground-breaking nature of Brodie's work is generally acknowledged within Mormon studies, and No Man Knows My History influenced the field in several lasting ways. The book "completely demolished", in the words of Jan Shipps, the hypothesis that the Book of Mormon was based on a novel manuscript written by Solomon Spaulding. Brodie also rejected earlier academic hypotheses that Smith was epileptic or paranoid and instead depicted Smith as rational and thoughtful. The interpretation of Smith as possessing all his faculties spread and persisted in scholarly studies of Mormonism. Also significantly, No Man Knows My History raised awareness of Smith's and Mormons' participation in politics and the resultant political dimension of both Mormon and anti-Mormon activities. In 2019, Theological Librarianship described the book's historiographical influence by stating that its "impact on the field cannot be overstated".

No Man Knows My History also contributed to the development of a more open-minded approach to church history among Mormon scholars. Historian Marvin S. Hill urged future scholars to avoid extremes in studies of Joseph Smith and instead find a middle ground between hagiography and cynicism. Roger D. Launius considered the book a turning point from "old" to "new" Mormon history, shifting the field away from polemical supports for or attacks on faith and toward objectively understanding events in a search for truth.

In 1971, Hill wrote:

[No Man Knows My History] has had tremendous influence upon informed Mormon thinking, as shown by the fact that whole issues of B.Y.U. Studies and Dialogue have been devoted to considering questions on the life of the Mormon prophet raised by Brodie. There is evidence that her book has had strong negative impact on popular Mormon thought as well, since to this day in certain circles in Utah to acknowledge that one has "read Fawn Brodie" is to create doubts as to one's loyalty to the Church.

Other scholars in the history of Mormonism have expressed concern over Brodie's long-lasting influence as unhealthy for the field of Mormon studies. In 1995, Roger D. Launius wrote, "The degree to which Mormon historiography has been shaped by the long shadow of Fawn Brodie since 1945 is both disturbing and unnecessary," and he worried that scholars' preoccupation with either disproving or supporting No Man Knows My History "stunt[ed]" the field by narrowing its focus to topics explored in the book. In 2005, Cohen echoed this concern.

In the years since No Man Knows My History, various historians of Mormonism have posited a range of interpretations of Smith, generally affirming Smith's religiousness. In 1998, non-Mormon Dan Vogel agreed with Brodie that Smith deceived others but posited him as a "pious deceiver" who lied in order to impel people toward repentance and faith in God. In his 2005 book Rough Stone Rolling, historian Richard Bushman, a Mormon, sought to challenge the popularity of No Man Knows My History by studying Smith's cultural context and sympathetically understanding him as an accomplished but contradictory person. In 2014, religious studies scholar Ann Taves, who is not Mormon, proposed a naturalistic model of Smith that nevertheless rejected the idea of fraudulence, instead interpreting Smith as a "skilled perceiver" who, with the assistance of other believers, manifested a new religious reality they mutually and sincerely believed in. In 2020, William L. Davis similarly posed a naturalistic model while still interpreting Smith as sincerely religious without deception.

In 2019, an opinion essay published in Theological Librarianship assessed that "contemporary scholars have found multiple flaws in Brodie's methodology and conclusions, so her work has fallen out of fashion considerably, but its impact on the field cannot be overstated".

== Mormon responses ==
=== The Church of Jesus Christ of Latter-day Saints ===
Although No Man Knows My History questioned many common Mormon beliefs and portrayals of Joseph Smith, the work was not immediately condemned by the Church of Jesus Christ of Latter-day Saints (LDS Church), even as the book went into a second printing. In 1946, the Improvement Era, an official periodical of the church, claimed that many of the book's citations arose from doubtful sources and that the biography was "of no interest to Latter-day Saints who have correct knowledge of the history of Joseph Smith." The Church News section of the Deseret News provided a lengthy critique that acknowledged the biography's "fine literary style" but denounced it as "a composite of all anti-Mormon books that have gone before." BYU professor Hugh Nibley wrote a scathing 62-page pamphlet entitled No, Ma'am, That's Not History, asserting that Brodie had cited sources supportive only of her conclusions while conveniently ignoring others. Brodie considered Nibley's pamphlet to be "a well-written, clever piece of Mormon propaganda" but dismissed it as "a flippant and shallow piece." The church formally excommunicated Brodie in June 1946 for apostasy, citing her publication of views "contrary to the beliefs, doctrines, and teachings of the Church."

=== Reorganized Church of Jesus Christ of Latter Day Saints ===
Shortly after the release of No Man Knows My History, leaders of the Reorganized Church of Jesus Christ of Latter Day Saints (RLDS; now called Community of Christ) warned Brodie they would sue her, though the Standard-Examiner describes these as having been "empty threats." Israel A. Smith, president of the RLDS Church at the time, claimed that Brodie's authorship of No Man Knows as a "renegade Mormon, born into a Mormon family" was evidence the LDS Church was "an evil bird that fouls its own nest." In 1966, RLDS scholar and member Robert B. Flanders disapproved of the book's uncritical use of 19th-century anti-Mormon literature and criticized Brodie's "zeal to create the grand and ultimate expose of Mormonism." Nevertheless, Flanders also recognized Brodie's "painstaking" research and considered the book "transitional" in the field shift from "old" to "new" Mormon history because it possessed elements of both.

== See also ==
- History of Joseph Smith by His Mother
- Joseph Smith–History
- Joseph Smith: The Making of a Prophet
- Newell G. Bringhurst
