= David McKay (politician) =

American politician (1844–1917)

David Mckay
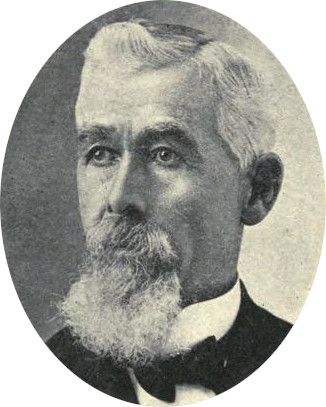
- Born: May 3, 1844; Thurso, Scotland
- Died: November 10, 1917 (aged 73); Ogden, Utah
- Known for: Republican state senator and longtime LDS bishop of Huntsville, Utah

David McKay (May 3, 1844 – November 10, 1917) was a member of the Utah State Senate. He was the father of David O. McKay and Thomas E. McKay.

McKay was born in Thurso, Scotland. His family joined the Church of Jesus Christ of Latter-day Saints (LDS Church) in 1850. The family sailed for the United States in 1856, intending to go to Utah Territory. However, due to financial difficulties, they stayed in New York working to earn money for rail passage for two years and then worked an additional year in Iowa to earn enough money to head to Utah.

At first they settled in Ogden, Utah, but McKay later took up farming in Huntsville, Utah. He married Jennette Evans, an immigrant from Wales. They were married in the Endowment House on April 9, 1867, with the marriage performed by Wilford Woodruff. From 1881 to 1883, McKay served a mission for the LDS Church in the British Isles. McKay later served as bishop of the Huntsville Ward.

McKay served three terms in the Utah State Senate as a Republican. He was also a member of the Utah Militia. He was a member of the Weber Stake Academy (the predecessor of Weber State University) Board of Education from its founding in 1888 until 1908. He was a moving force behind several canal companies as well as the Huntsville Cooperative Mercantile Exchange and the Ogden Valley Creamery Company.

== Sources ==
- Mary Jane Woodger. David O. McKay: Beloved Prophet. American Fork, Utah: Covenant Communications, 2004. p. 8-9.
- 1903 Utah State Senate journal
- Improvement Era, Vol. 8, Issue 4, p. 317.
