= Abner Cole =

American newspaper editor

Abner Cole (August 17, 1783 – July 13, 1835), also known by his pen name Obadiah Dogberry, Esq., was a 19th-century American newspaper editor. He was one of the earliest critics of the spiritual claims of Joseph Smith, the founder of the Latter Day Saint movement, having commented on the "Golden Bible" before it was even published as the Book of Mormon. Cole's publishing philosophy was one of freethought, which flourished in periodicals in the northeastern United States between 1825 and 1850.

== Life ==
Cole was born in Chesterfield, Massachusetts, the son of Southworth and Rucksbe (Bryant) Cole. In 1797, his family settled on the east side of Canandaigua Lake in Gorham, New York. After a short career as a judge and perhaps a lawyer before that, Cole began editing a weekly newspaper in Palmyra, New York called The Reflector. Under Cole, the newspaper included anything which might spark the interest of a reader from mineralogy to foreign affairs. Cole wrote most of the contents of the paper under the pseudonym "Obadiah Dogberry, Esq." In the paper's first edition on September 2, 1829, Cole wrote the first public criticisms of Mormonism: "The Golden Bible, by Joseph Smith Junior, author and proprietor, is now in press and will shortly appear. Priestcraft is short lived!" The phrase, "author and proprietor", appears next to Smith's name on the title page of the first edition of the Book of Mormon. Cole knew this before the book was published because it was being printed in the same one-room print shop as his newspaper.

Starting in January 1830, two months before the Book of Mormon was published, the Reflector printed the first few chapters of what he called "Jo Smith's Gold Bible" accompanied by his own criticisms. Cole obtained the segments of the book by stealing the typeset at E. B. Grandin's press, where the Book of Mormon, as well as the "Reflector", were being printed. Accounts vary as to what happened afterward. Apparently, Smith confronted Cole and complained that he was violating his copyright. Smith may have threatened to sue and Cole may have challenged Smith to a fight. Shortly thereafter, Cole ceased publishing excerpts from the book.

Later, in June 1830, Cole printed two satires of the Book of Mormon under the name, "Book of Pukei". This satire involved an old man appearing to Smith dressed as a Native American Indian and claiming to be a messenger sent by Mormon. It also provided some insight into the treasure-digging activities of the Smiths and Luman Walter. Cole's commentary on Mormonism quickly gained a readership outside Palmyra and he went on to print a six-part series with a more analytical tone. "Although he did not change his scornful tone," historian Richard L. Bushman wrote, Cole "did replace satire with argument and attempted to make a case against Joseph Smith that would appeal to his enlarged readership." Cole ended his tenure as editor of the Reflector in 1831.

Cole presented Smith as a charlatan too uneducated to have written the Book of Mormon himself and supposed that Smith got help from "Walters the Magician" (Luman Walter), who was said to have shown his followers a Latin translation of Cicero and claimed that it was a record of the Native Americans. Cole mentions this idea in the "Book of Pukei". He ridiculed Smith's healing of Newel Knight, objecting that "no prophet, since the destruction of Jerusalem by Titus, has performed half so many wonders as have been attributed to that spindle shanked ignoramus Jo Smith".

In 1832, Cole moved to nearby Rochester, New York, where he published the Liberal Advocate until 1834. In this paper, he famously criticized the revivals of evangelist Charles Grandison Finney, a leader of the Second Great Awakening. Cole died in 1835.

== See also ==
- Eber D. Howe
- Samuel Tyler Lawrence (brother of his wife Fanny)
