= Dan Vogel =

Scholar of the Latter Day Saint movement

Daniel Arlon Vogel (born 1955) is an independent researcher, writer, and author on a number of works that include Joseph Smith: The Making of a Prophet and is most known for his work on early Mormon documents.

== Joseph Smith biography ==
Vogel was awarded the Best Book award in September 2004 by the John Whitmer Historical Association and the Turner-Bergera Best Biography award by the Mormon History Association in May 2005 for his biography Joseph Smith: The Making of a Prophet.

Vogel argues in the biography that Joseph Smith was a pious fraud—that Smith essentially invented his religious claims for what he believed were noble, faith-promoting purposes. Vogel identifies the roots of the pious fraud in the conflict between members of the Smith family, who were divided between the skepticism and universalism of Joseph Smith, Sr., and the more mainstream Protestant faith of Lucy Mack Smith. Vogel interweaves the history of Joseph Smith with interpretation of the Book of Mormon, which is read as springing from the young man's psychology and experiences.

== Reception ==
In the LDS historical community, Vogel's work has received significant recognition. In 1997, Vogel received the "Best Documentary Editing/Bibliography Award" from the Mormon History Association for Volume 1 of Early Mormon Documents. Vogel's 2004 biography of Joseph Smith received the highest award for such works from both the John Whitmer Historical Association and the Mormon History Association. LDS history journals have reviewed most of Vogel's publications. A typical summary: "Despite its idiosyncrasies, Early Mormon Documents remains the most useful collection of documents on the early movement available to researchers. Its unconventionality may actually magnify its importance, not diminish it."

Vogel's scholarship on the topic has been debated by Mormon apologists and scholars who have stated that he is critical of Mormon faith claims. He has also been criticized by ex-Mormons and anti-Mormons for not being sufficiently critical of Joseph Smith. Larry Morris praised his efforts to produce the multi-volume Early Mormon Documents.

Many of Vogel's books have been critically reviewed by members of FARMS, a Mormon apologetics institute. For example, in 1991, Mormon religion professor and FARMS scholar Stephen E. Robinson suggested that Vogel's naturalistic arguments closely resemble those of Korihor, an atheist polemicist in the Book of Mormon.

== Publications ==
- —— (1986). Indian Origins and the Book of Mormon. Salt Lake City, Utah: Signature Books. ISBN 0-941214-42-7.
- —— (1988). Religious Seekers and the Advent of Mormonism. Salt Lake City, Utah: Signature Books. ISBN 0-941214-64-8.
- —— (1990). The Word of God: Essays on Mormon Scripture. Salt Lake City, Utah: Signature Books. ISBN 0-941214-93-1.
- —— (1993). "Anti-Universalist Rhetoric in the Book of Mormon". In Metcalfe, Brent Lee (ed.). New Approaches to the Book of Mormon: Explorations in Critical Methodology. Salt Lake City, Utah: Signature Books. ISBN 1-56085-017-5.
- —— (2004). Joseph Smith: The Making of a Prophet. Signature Books. ISBN 1-56085-179-1.
- —— (2021). Book of Abraham Apologetics: A Review and Critique. Signature Books. ISBN 978-1-56085-290-2.
- —— (2023). Charisma Under Pressure: Joseph Smith, American Prophet, 1831-1839. Signature Books. ISBN 978-1-56085-460-9.

As editor

- Vogel, Dan, ed. (1996–2003). Early Mormon Documents. (Vols. 1-5). Salt Lake City, Utah: Signature Books. ISBN 1-56085-072-8.
- Vogel, Dan; Metcalfe, Brent Lee, eds. (2002). American Apocrypha: Essays on the Book of Mormon. Salt Lake City, Utah: Signature Books. ISBN 1-56085-151-1.
- Vogel, Dan, ed. (2015). History of Joseph Smith and the Church of Jesus Christ of Latter-day Saints: a Source and Text-critical Edition. Salt Lake City, Utah: Smith-Pettit Foundation. ISBN 9781560852452.
