= Fawn M. Brodie =

American historian and biographer (1915–1981)

- Brodie in 1966
- Born: Fawn McKay; September 15, 1915; Ogden, Utah, U.S.
- Died: January 10, 1981 (aged 65); Santa Monica, California, U.S.
- Education: Weber College; University of Utah (BA); University of Chicago (MA)
- Occupations: Biographer and history professor
- Spouse: Bernard Brodie (m. 1936; died 1978)
- Children: 3
- Parent: Thomas E. McKay
- Relatives: George H. Brimhall (grandfather); David O. McKay (uncle)
- Writing career
- Subject: Psychobiography
- Notable works: No Man Knows My History (1945); Thomas Jefferson: An Intimate History (1974)

Fawn McKay Brodie (September 15, 1915 – January 10, 1981) was an American biographer and one of the first female professors of history at the University of California, Los Angeles (UCLA). She is best known for Thomas Jefferson: An Intimate History (1974), a work of psychobiography, and No Man Knows My History (1945), an early biography of Joseph Smith, the founder of the Latter Day Saint movement.

Raised in Utah in a respected, if impoverished, family who were members of the Church of Jesus Christ of Latter-day Saints (LDS Church), Fawn McKay drifted away from Mormonism during her years of graduate work at the University of Chicago and married Bernard Brodie, an academic who became a national defense expert; they had three children. Although Fawn Brodie eventually became one of the first tenured female professors of history at UCLA, she is best known for her five biographies, four of which incorporate insights from Freudian psychology.

Brodie's depiction of Joseph Smith in 1945 as a fraudulent "genius of improvisation" has been described as both a "beautifully written biography ... the work of a mature scholar [that] represented the first genuine effort to come to grips with the contradictory evidence about Smith's early life" and as a work that presented conjecture as fact. Her best-selling psychobiography of Thomas Jefferson, published in 1974, was the first modern examination of evidence that Jefferson had taken his slave Sally Hemings as a concubine and fathered children by her. Brodie concluded he had done so, a conclusion supported by a 1998 DNA analysis and current scholarly consensus.

== Early life ==
Fawn McKay was the second of five children of Thomas E. McKay and Fawn Brimhall. Born in Ogden, Utah, she grew up in Huntsville, about ten miles (16 km) east. Both her parents descended from families influential in early Mormonism. Her maternal grandfather, George H. Brimhall, was president of Brigham Young University. Her father, Thomas Evans McKay, was a bishop, president of the LDS Church's Swiss-Austrian Mission, and an Assistant to the Quorum of the Twelve Apostles. Brodie's paternal uncle, David O. McKay, was an LDS Church apostle when Brodie was born and later became the church's ninth president.

Despite the prominence of her family in the church, they lived in genteel poverty, their property burdened by unpayable debt. The young Fawn was perpetually embarrassed that their house did not have indoor plumbing.

Brodie early demonstrated precociousness. At three she memorized and recited lengthy poems. When a whooping cough epidemic convinced Brodie's mother to homeschool Fawn's sister, Flora, who was two years older, Fawn more than kept pace. Introduced to school in 1921, the six-year-old Fawn was advanced to the fourth grade; when she lost the school spelling bee to a twelve-year-old, "she cried and cried that this bright boy, twice her age, had spelled her down." At ten she had a poem printed in the LDS youth periodical, The Juvenile Instructor; at fourteen she was salutatorian of Weber High School.

Although Brodie grew to maturity in a rigorously religious environment that included strict Sabbatarianism and evening prayers on her knees, her mother was a closet skeptic who thought the LDS Church was a "wonderful social order" but who doubted its dogma. According to Brodie, in the late 1930s, while her father headed Mormon mission activities in German-speaking Europe, her mother became a "thoroughgoing heretic" while accompanying him there.

== Education and marriage ==
From 1930 to 1932, Brodie attended Weber College, a two-year institution in Ogden, then owned by the LDS Church, where she became an accomplished public speaker and participated in intercollegiate debate. She completed a bachelor's degree in English literature at the University of Utah in 1934. There she began to question core Mormon beliefs, such as that the Native Americans had originated in ancient Israel. After graduation at age nineteen, she returned to teach English at Weber College.

In high school, Brodie had begun dating a classmate, Dilworth Jensen. They wrote to each other faithfully during Jensen's long absence on an LDS mission in Europe. In June 1935, they were both accepted for graduate studies at the University of California, Berkeley, and friends assumed they would marry. Her sister, Flora, had recently eloped with Jensen's brother, whom the McKays disliked. They encouraged Fawn to attend the University of Chicago rather than marry. She seemed to have had "growing doubts about marrying" Jensen.

At the University of Chicago, where she earned a master's degree in English in 1936, she lost her faith in religion entirely. In 1975, she recalled, "It was like taking a hot coat off in the summertime. The sense of liberation I had at the University of Chicago was exhilarating. I felt very quickly that I could not go back to the old life, and I never did." She continued to write to Jensen until shortly before she married Bernard Brodie on her graduation day, August 28, 1936.

Brodie was a native of Chicago, the son of Latvian Jewish immigrants, who was alienated from both his family and his family's religion. A bright graduate student in international relations, he eventually became a noted expert in military strategy during the Cold War era. The McKays were horrified at their daughter's impending marriage; Dilworth Jensen felt betrayed. David O. McKay went to Chicago to warn his niece of the family's strong objections. Out of consideration for her mother, Fawn scheduled the wedding in an LDS chapel, but of the McKays, only Fawn's mother attended. None of Brodie's family did.

== No Man Knows My History ==
=== Composition ===
Having found temporary employment at the Harper Library of the University of Chicago, Brodie began researching the origins of the Book of Mormon. By mid-1939, she confided to her uncle, Dean R. Brimhall (another ex-Mormon), that she intended to write a scholarly biography of Joseph Smith. Progress toward that goal was slowed by the birth of the Brodies' first child and by three rapid moves, a consequence of her husband's search for a permanent position. In 1943, Fawn Brodie was encouraged enough by her progress to enter her 300-page draft in a contest for the Alfred A. Knopf literary fellowship. In May, her application was judged the best of the 44 entries.

Brodie continued her research at the Library of Congress in Washington, D.C., where the Brodies had moved for her husband's work, as well as at the headquarters of the Reorganized Church of Jesus Christ of Latter Day Saints in Independence, Missouri. Eventually she returned to Utah, where she did research in the LDS Church Archives. She gained access to some highly restricted materials by claiming to be "Brother McKay's daughter", a subterfuge that made her feel "guilty as hell". Her pursuit of little-known documents eventually attracted the attention of her uncle, David O. McKay. After a "painful, acrimonious encounter" with her uncle, Brodie promised never again to consult materials in the church's archives.

Brodie's research was enlarged by other students of Mormonism, most notably Dale L. Morgan, who became a lifelong friend, mentor, and sounding board. Brodie completed her biography of Joseph Smith in 1944, and it was published in 1945 by Alfred A. Knopf, when she was thirty years old.

=== Thesis ===
Its title, No Man Knows My History, alludes to a comment Joseph Smith made in a speech shortly before his death in 1844. Brodie presents the young Joseph as a lazy, good-natured, extroverted, and unsuccessful treasure seeker. In an attempt to improve his family's fortunes, he developed the notion of golden plates and then the concept of a religious novel, the Book of Mormon, based in part on View of the Hebrews, an earlier work by a contemporary clergyman Ethan Smith. Brodie asserts that at first Smith was a deliberate impostor; but at some point, in nearly untraceable steps, he became convinced that he really was a prophet, though never escaping "the memory of the conscious artifice" that created the Book of Mormon.

=== Reviews ===
Non-Mormon reviewers praised either the author's research, the excellence of her literary style, or both. Newsweek called Brodie's book "a definitive biography in the finest sense of the word", and Time praised the author for her "skill and scholarship and admirable detachment". Other reviews were less positive. Brodie was especially annoyed by the review of novelist Vardis Fisher, who accused her of stating "as indisputable facts what can only be regarded as conjectures supported by doubtful evidence". Bernard DeVoto wrote a mixed review, but he praised the biography as "the best book about the Mormons so far published". DeVoto, who believed Joseph Smith was "paranoid", said that Brodie had not provided adequate psychological explanations for Smith's behavior. Brodie also came to believe that a thorough psychological analysis of Smith was essential and that she "hadn't gone far enough in this direction".

=== Reaction of the LDS Church ===
Although No Man Knows My History criticized many foundational Mormon beliefs about Joseph Smith, the LDS Church was slow to condemn the work, even as the book went into a second printing. In 1946, The Improvement Era, an official periodical of the church, said that many of the book's citations were from "doubtful sources" and that the biography was "of no interest to Latter-day Saints who have correct knowledge of the history of Joseph Smith". The "Church News" section of the Deseret News had a lengthy critique: it praised the biography's "fine literary style" and denounced it as "a composite of all anti-Mormon books that have gone before". In the booklet No, Ma'am, That's Not History, Hugh Nibley, a BYU professor and LDS historian, challenged Brodie. He asserted that she had cited sources supportive only of her conclusions while conveniently ignoring others. Brodie described the Deseret News pamphlet as "a well-written, clever piece of Mormon propaganda", but she dismissed the more popular "No, Ma'am, That's Not History" as "a flippant and shallow piece".

In May 1946, the LDS Church excommunicated Brodie. She never tried to regain her membership. Brodie once wrote to a friend that what she suffered from her disillusionment with Mormonism "had to do with the pain I caused my family. The disillusionment itself was...a liberating experience." Before No Man Knows My History was published, Brodie sought to comfort her parents, "You brought us all up to revere the truth, which is the noblest ideal a parent can instill in his children, and the fact that we come out on somewhat different roads certainly is no reflection on you." Brodie's mother and three sisters were enthusiastic about the book, but Thomas McKay refused to read it.

== Critical success with psychobiography ==
=== Thaddeus Stevens: Scourge of the South ===
Brodie genuinely enjoyed her roles as wife and mother, believing that rearing children, especially when they were small, was "enormously fulfilling". Eventually the Brodies had two boys and a girl. Still, Brodie was not content to be without a writing project for long. After some desultory investigation of other possibilities, she settled on a biography of Thaddeus Stevens, a Republican member of the House of Representatives from Pennsylvania during the Civil War and the Reconstruction era.

Brodie believed that previous historians had unduly vilified Stevens, and she relished the prospect of rebuilding a reputation rather than, as in her Joseph Smith biography, tearing one down. Stevens as a champion of black people was a timely interest as the Civil Rights Movement increased in intensity. Research materials were available at Yale University, where Bernard Brodie was employed. Fawn Brodie also wondered how Stevens had been affected psychologically by having a club foot.

In the view of students of historiography such as Ernst Breisach, all biographers are to some degree psychohistorians, and any biography that refused to examine motives, character traits, and the depth of personality would be flat and uninteresting. Brodie became interested in applying the theories of professional psychoanalysts to the study of historical personalities, a subject especially popular during the mid-twentieth century. At first Brodie was amused at how much psychoanalysis had "become a religion" to its practitioners, but she later became a committed devotee of psychoanalytic theory. Brodie made a number of acquaintances among psychoanalysts who helped her evaluate Thaddeus Stevens, notably Ralph R. Greenson, with whom she developed a close personal and professional relationship. Both the Brodies also undertook psychoanalysis, he for insomnia and she for chronic mild depression and sexual problems. (Bernard's employer, the RAND Corporation, paid most of the bills.) Brodie's interest in psychology during this period was heightened by family problems: her mother attempted suicide three times, the second by cutting herself with a Catholic crucifix, and the third (which succeeded) by setting herself on fire.

The Stevens biography took the better part of a decade to complete.

==== Reviews ====
When Brodie published the Stevens book in 1959, it enjoyed virtually unanimous praise from critics. Major historians of the Civil War and Reconstruction era, including David Herbert Donald and C. Vann Woodward, praised the biography. Donald called Brodie's psychoanalysis of Stevens "a tour de force". Most gracious was Richard N. Current, who had written a less favorable account of Stevens, which Brodie had earlier criticized. Current not only urged W. W. Norton to publish a paperback edition of Brodie's book, but wrote a blurb praising the author for writing "more imaginatively" and "more resourcefully...than any other Stevens biographer". Nevertheless, Thaddeus Stevens was a commercial failure, selling fewer than fifteen hundred copies before going out of print in less than a year.

== Other work ==
In 1960 the Brodies spent a year in France, during which Fawn spent considerable energy researching and writing From Crossbow to H-Bomb, a co-authored paperback intended as a college text. It discussed the influence of science on military technology. Bernard Brodie had signed the contract with Random House, but his wife did most of the research and writing.

=== The Devil Drives: A Life of Sir Richard Burton ===
When the family returned to California, Alfred Knopf asked Brodie to edit and write a new introduction for Sir Richard Francis Burton's memoir, The City of the Saints and Across the Rocky Mountains to California (1862). Almost immediately she "was lost" to Burton, a man whom she described as "fascinating beyond belief". She soon planned a full biography. Like Brodie, Burton was an agnostic who was fascinated by religion and all things sexual. Brodie consulted with the psychoanalyst community and used her own free association to explore Burton's subconscious. For instance, she noted that immediately before and after Burton wrote about his mother, he talked "about cheating, decapitation, mutilations, smashings—all the stories and metaphors are violent, negative, and hostile".

==== Reviews ====
The Devil Drives: A Life of Sir Richard Burton was published in May 1967 and was chosen as a featured selection by both the Literary Guild Book Club and the History Book Club. Reviews were again generally positive. The New York Times Book Review promoted it as an "[e]xcellent biography of a bizarre man who had a bizarre wife—and life".

=== Professorship at UCLA ===
The publication of three acclaimed biographies allowed Brodie to become a part-time lecturer in history at the University of California, Los Angeles although she had not earned a Ph.D. (Both her bachelor's and master's degrees were in English.) As a woman, Brodie met some resistance from the large and overwhelmingly male history faculty, but her specialty in the current field of psychohistory aided her original appointment and her eventual promotion to full professor. Brodie taught both larger upper-division lectures in American history and small seminars on American political biography, preferring the latter.

== Thomas Jefferson: An Intimate History ==
Thomas Jefferson was a natural subject for Brodie's fourth biography. One of her courses focused on the United States from 1800 to 1830, and her seminar in political biography could serve as an appropriate forum for a work-in-progress. Throughout this period, Brodie was attracted to Mormon studies and was importuned by several publishers to write a biography of Brigham Young. The LDS entrepreneur, O.C. Tanner (1904–1993), offered Brodie $10,000 in advance to produce a manuscript. But Dale Morgan told Brodie that Madeline Reeder McQuown, a close friend, had nearly completed a huge manuscript on Young. In fact, McQuown's biography was little more than a few rough drafts of early chapters, but Brodie was dissuaded and abandoned Young for Thomas Jefferson.

By May 1968, Brodie was committed to writing the Jefferson biography. She understood that it could not be a full account. The study of Jefferson had become a virtual career for several living historians. For instance, Dumas Malone was in the process of completing a six-volume biography of Jefferson, which won the Pulitzer Prize in 1975. Brodie decided to concentrate on a biography of "the private man". She decided to build on several recently published articles on the historical controversy describing a reported sexual relationship between Jefferson and Sally Hemings, a quadroon slave said to be the half-sister of his late wife. The topic was timely during a period of increased national interest in race, sex, and presidential hypocrisy. Brodie had personal reasons as well, having discovered that her husband had been conducting an extramarital affair.

To Brodie, Jefferson's ambiguous posturings on slavery could be explained by his personal life. If he had been conducting a 38-year affair with a slave, then he could not free his slaves because once they were freed, Virginia law would force them from the state, unless he gained permission from the legislature for them to stay. He could continue his liaison with Hemings only if his slaves remained slaves. Two of the most prominent Jefferson biographers of the twentieth century, Dumas Malone and Merrill Peterson, had relied on Jefferson family testimony by two Randolph grandchildren, who named his Carr nephews as fathers. They discounted other evidence about this alleged sexual relationship, including by Madison Hemings in 1873, who identified Jefferson as his father and said he had a long relationship with his mother. The relationship was first reported in 1802 by the journalist James T. Callender when Jefferson was president, after Callender failed to win an appointment by the president.

Working from Winthrop Jordan's Black on White (1968), Brodie also used Dumas Malone's documentation of Jefferson's activities to correlate his stays at Monticello with the conception period of each of Sally Hemings' children, whose births he recorded in the Farm Book. She discovered that Hemings never conceived when Jefferson was not at Monticello, during years when he was often away for months at a time.

=== Reviews ===
By 1971 Brodie had a $15,000 advance from her publisher and had presented a summary of her arguments at the annual meeting of the Organization of American Historians. The Jefferson biographer Merrill Peterson pilloried the paper. She also wrote an article for American Heritage of her work in progress, entitled "The Great Jefferson Taboo", about her conclusion that the Jefferson–Hemings relationship took place. In a change from its usual practice, the magazine included all her notes to show the sources of her conclusions.

Brodie and her publisher understood that the biography would be controversial. An in-house editor at W. W. Norton was critical: "Doesn't [Brodie] know about making the theory fit the facts instead of trying to explain the facts to fit the theory? It's pretty fascinating, like working out a detective story, but she doesn't play fair."

Thomas Jefferson: An Intimate History was published in February 1974, and it was the main spring selection of the Book-of-the-Month Club. Brodie tried to ensure that none of the three foremost Jefferson scholars, Dumas Malone, Merrill Peterson, and Julian Boyd, would review the book. Brodie was interviewed on NBC's Today Show, and the book quickly "became a topic of comment in elite social-literary circles", as well as among political people. The biography was an immediate commercial success; it was on the New York Times bestseller list for thirteen weeks. Jefferson sold 80,000 copies in hardback and 270,000 copies in paperback, and netted Brodie $350,000 in royalties—adjusted for inflation, more than a million dollars in the early twenty-first century. Peterson concluded in 1998 that "[n]o book of the last quarter century has left a more indelible mark on the Jefferson image" than Brodie's An Intimate History.

Literary reviews were generally positive, while historians were often critical of Brodie's speculations. Mainstream historians had long denied the possibility of Jefferson's relation with Sally Hemings, although such interracial liaisons were so common that by the late eighteenth century, visitors remarked on the numerous white slaves in Virginia and the Upper South. "The Richmond Examiner on September 25, 1802, in a rare admission, stated that "thousands" of mulatto children were then being born in the South." Mary Chesnut and Fanny Kemble, educated women of the planter elite, also wrote about many interracial families in the era shortly before the American Civil War.

Like many previous Jefferson biographers, Brodie developed an intense affection for her protagonist. She claimed that in dreams, she and Jefferson became "man and wife". Bernard Brodie is supposed to have muttered, "God, I'm glad that man is out of the house." Fawn Brodie wondered where one could go after Jefferson, "but down".

After her book was published, Brodie was contacted by some Eston Hemings Jefferson descendants who recognized his name from her account. His descendants had married white, and this generation appeared to be white. They discovered that their fathers in the 1940s had decided that, to protect their children from racial discrimination associated with descent from Sally Hemings and Thomas Jefferson, they would tell the children they were descended from Jefferson's uncle. All these Jefferson descendants learned in the 1970s of their alleged descent from Eston Hemings, Sally Hemings and Thomas Jefferson. Brodie wrote a follow-up article about the Jefferson-Hemings grandchildren in 1976, entitled "Thomas Jefferson's Unknown Grandchildren: A Study in Historical Silences", published in October 1976 in American Heritage magazine. Photographs and other documentary material they gave her have been donated to UCLA archives.

=== 1998 Jefferson DNA study and new consensus ===
In 1997 Annette Gordon-Reed published Thomas Jefferson and Sally Hemings: An American Controversy, in which she analyzed the historiography and noted the bias of historians in assessing conflicting accounts by descendants of the Jefferson family and the Hemings family, as well as evidence that they overlooked. She also noted Malone's data, which established that Jefferson was at Monticello during the conception period for each of Sally Heming's children.

To try to resolve the renewed controversy with modern techniques, in 1998 a Y-DNA study was conducted of descendants of the Jefferson male line, Eston Hemings (the youngest son of Sally Hemings), the Carr nephews, and Thomas Woodson (whose family also claimed descent from Jefferson). It found that the Y-DNA of the Eston Hemings descendant matched the rare haplotype of the male Jefferson line. In addition, the tests conclusively found that there was no match between the Carr line and the Hemings descendant.

In January 2000, a research committee commissioned by the Thomas Jefferson Foundation, which operates Monticello, concluded that there was a high probability that Jefferson had been the father of Eston Hemings and likely of all Hemings children listed in the Monticello records. Since then the Foundation has revised exhibits and tour commentary to reflect Jefferson's paternity of all Hemings' children, and it has sponsored new research into the interracial society of Monticello and Charlottesville. Since 2000, most academics, including biographers such as Joseph Ellis, have agreed with the new consensus.

Other historians, including those associated with the Thomas Jefferson Heritage Society, founded after the DNA study, continue to disagree.

== Richard Nixon: The Shaping of His Character ==
Brodie considered a range of subjects for a new biography. Brigham Young was a clear field, but she decided not to "return to old ground". Richard Nixon had resigned the presidency shortly after she had finished Jefferson, and Brodie had spoken formally to both students and others about the former president. As a liberal Democrat, Brodie had developed a "repellent fascination" with Nixon, a man whom she called "a rattlesnake", a "plain damn liar", and a "shabby, pathetic felon". Although Brodie thought Nixon was an imposter like Joseph Smith, she did not believe him to be the "charming imposter the Mormon leader was".

Her interest in the former president had a personal basis as well. One of her sons had nearly been drafted in 1969 shortly after Nixon had won election on the promise to end the Vietnam War. (At the last minute, sympathetic physicians had reclassified Bruce Brodie as unfit for military service on the basis of his allergies.)

Also, when Nixon had sought information to discredit Daniel Ellsberg, who had leaked the Pentagon Papers, his operatives had burglarized the office of Ellsberg's psychiatrist, Dr. Lewis Fielding. Ellsberg was a close friend and former RAND associate of Bernard Brodie. Fielding was Fawn Brodie's long-time therapist. Brodie considered "Nixon the perpetrator of an assault on her privacy".

Although neither Bernard nor her publisher was enthusiastic about her choice, Brodie began to work on her new project. She resigned her professorship at UCLA in 1977 to devote herself to research, including, for the first time, in oral history collections. Brodie conducted 150 interviews. She tried unsuccessfully to interview Henry Kissinger—whom she knew on a first-name basis—and Nixon for what she described in a letter to him as "a compassionate and accurate study". (Nixon did not reply) Although she could find no evidence, Brodie began to think that he had engaged in a homosexual relationship with his good friend Bebe Rebozo. Her psychoanalyst friends tried to warn her off this topic.

=== Illness ===
In November 1977, Bernard Brodie was diagnosed with a serious cancer, and Fawn Brodie suspended her research on Nixon: "That son of a bitch can wait." She nursed her husband until his death a year later. Afterward, she struggled with "a depression from which she would never really emerge". Under the circumstances, Nixon's biography seemed "like a total obscenity".

While hiking at a family reunion in 1980, Brodie became unusually tired. Shortly afterwards, she was diagnosed with metastatic lung cancer, although she had never smoked. Between chemotherapy treatments, she pushed ahead to complete the Nixon study. Her three children and a daughter-in-law provided moral and editorial support. Knowing that she could never complete a full biography, Brodie ended the manuscript with Nixon's pre-presidential years, lending it an unfinished quality.

=== Reviews ===
Richard Nixon: The Shaping of His Character was published in late 1981 and received reviews less enthusiastic than for any of her earlier books. Writing in The New Republic, Godfrey Hodgson questioned both her psychoanalytic approach and her motives: "[W]e are in danger of having the insights of psychotherapy used as a tool for character destruction, certainly for libel, potentially for revenge." According to J. Philipp Rosenberg, Brodie's study of Richard Nixon's early career demonstrated a weakness of psychobiography because it was written by an author who disliked her subject.

Sales of the book were disappointing, in part because of the reviews, and in part because memoirs by Nixon associates such as Henry Kissinger, John Ehrlichman, and John Dean had recently flooded the market. Perhaps Brodie's book was most influential in stimulating Oliver Stone to create his controversial 1995 movie Nixon.

== Death ==
Brodie died nine months before publication of Richard Nixon: The Shaping of His Character. As death neared, the cancer spread to her brain and bones, and Brodie suffered intense pain. During this period, she was visited in the hospital by her brother Thomas, who had remained a practicing Latter-day Saint. Brodie asked him to "give me a blessing", although she had long been estranged from both her brother and the LDS Church. A few days later, Brodie released a note saying that her request for a priesthood blessing should not be misinterpreted as a request to return to the church. It was Brodie's last signed statement. In accordance with her wishes, friends spread her ashes over the Santa Monica Mountains, which she loved and had successfully helped to protect from real estate development.

== Publications ==
- No Man Knows My History: The Life of Joseph Smith (1945) ISBN 0-679-73054-0
- Thaddeus Stevens: Scourge of the South (1959) ISBN 0-8446-0329-5
- The Devil Drives: A Life of Sir Richard Burton (1967) ISBN 0-393-30166-4
- From Crossbow to H-Bomb:The Evolution of the Weapons and Tactics of Warfare (co-written with Bernard Brodie) (1973) ISBN 978-0253201614
- Thomas Jefferson: An Intimate History (1974) ISBN 0-393-31752-8
- Richard Nixon: The Shaping of His Character (1981) ISBN 0-393-01467-3
