= Pomeroy Tucker =

American politician

Pomeroy Tucker (August 10, 1802 – June 30, 1870) was a journalist and New York politician.

== Early life ==
Born in Palmyra, New York, in 1802, Tucker served an apprenticeship as a printer in Palmyra, became a contributor to the Canandaigua Messenger, and in 1823 established the Wayne Sentinel as a Democratic organ. He was elected as the Wayne County representative to the New York State Assembly in 1837, and was for several years postmaster, and at one time a canal collector.

== Career ==
Tucker was employed as a printer for a time by E. B. Grandin, known for publishing the first order of the Book of Mormon, a sacred text of the churches of the Latter Day Saint movement. Tucker, by his own account "well acquainted" with Joseph Smith, his family, and "most of the early followers of Smith," was suspicious of Smith and the origins of Mormonism, and subsequently authored Origin, Rise, and Progress of Mormonism in 1867, a book considered to have been the "most influential anti-Mormon work in [its] period."

== Death ==
Tucker died on June 30, 1870.

== Works ==
- Tucker, Pomeroy (1867), Origin, Rise, and Progress of Mormonism, New York: D. Appleton & Company, OCLC 2314258
