= 1838 Mormon War =

Armed conflicts in Missouri, US

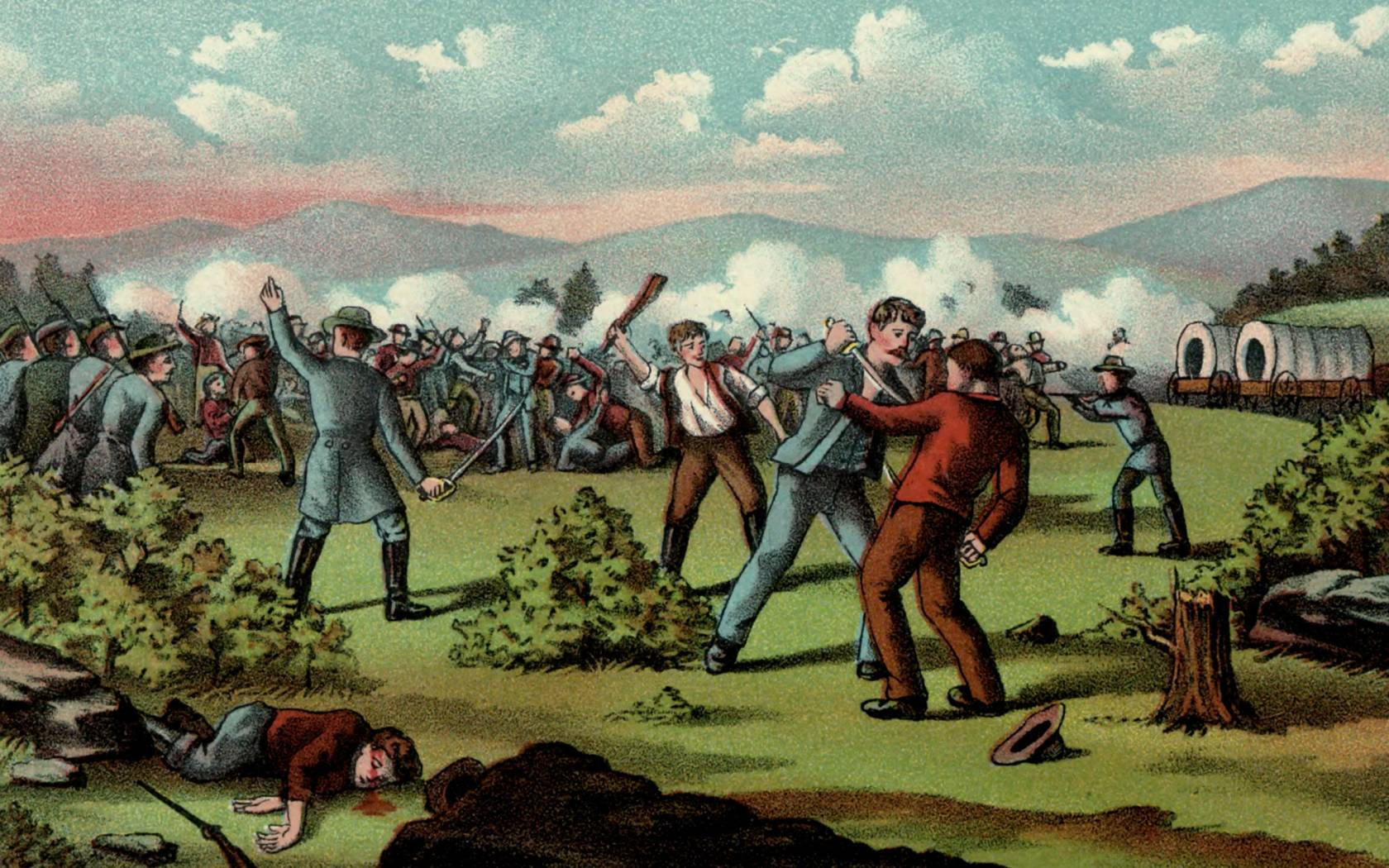
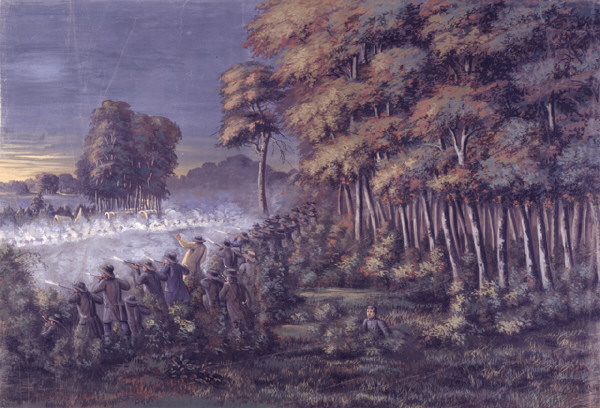
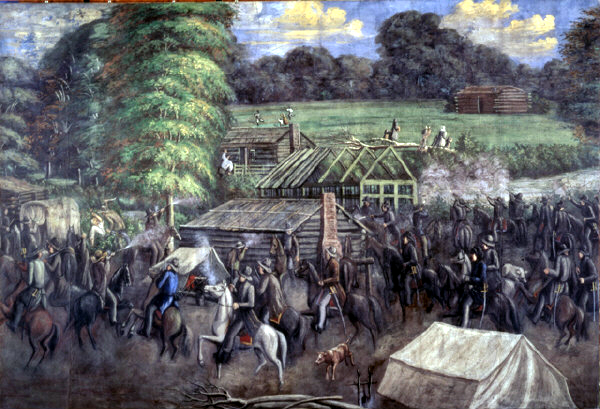
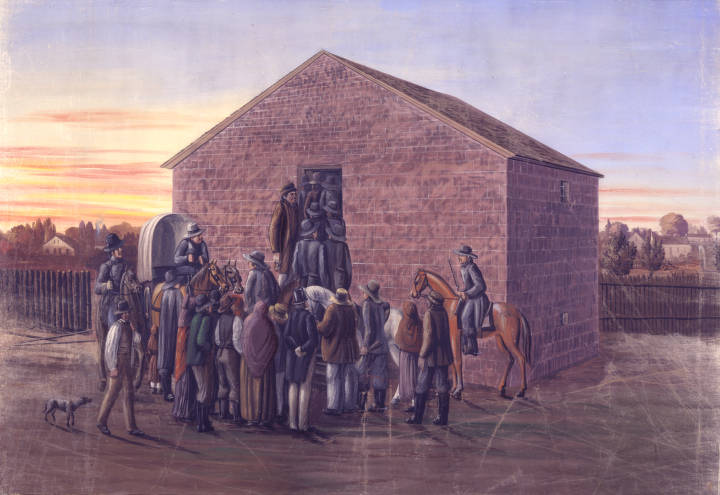
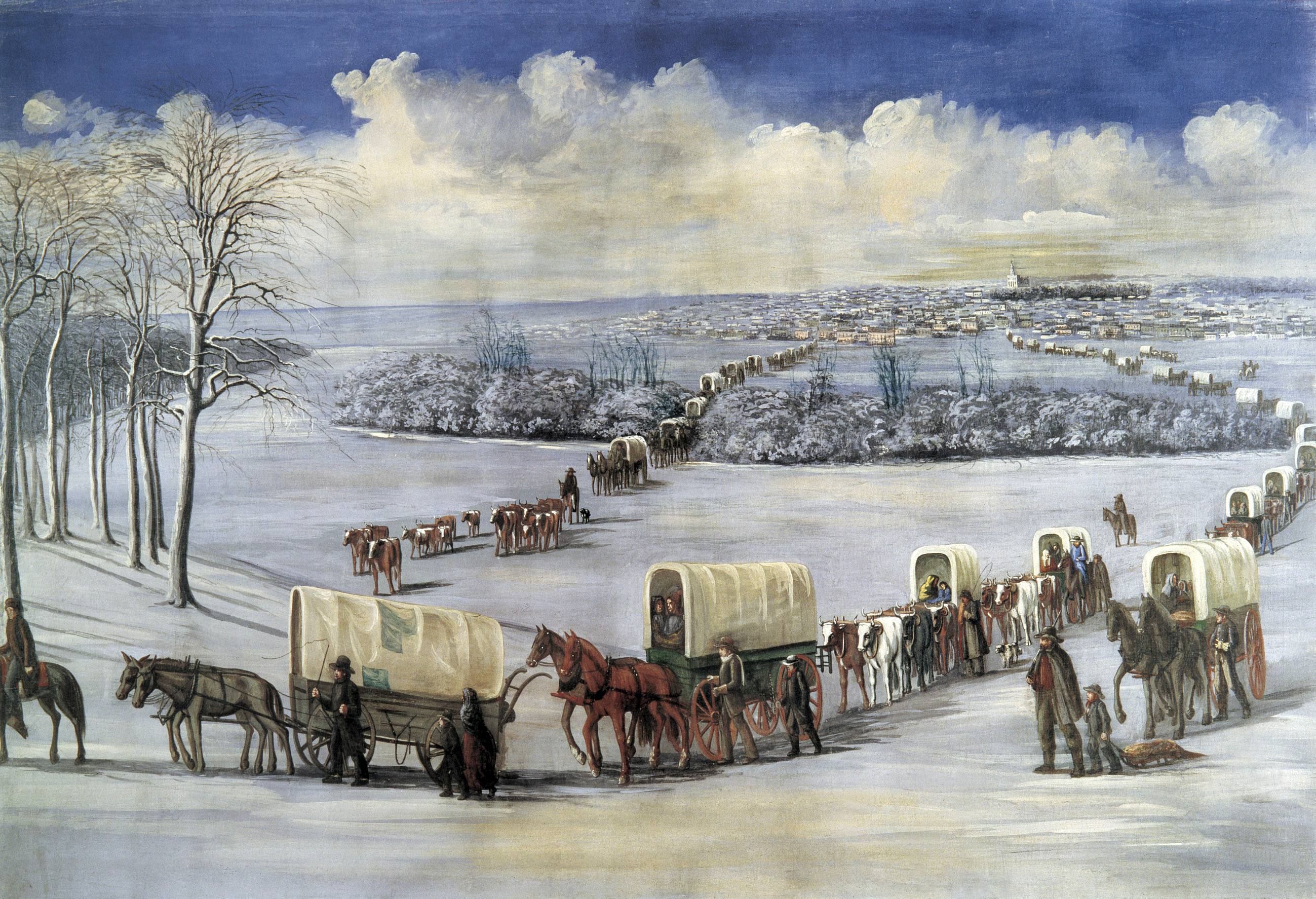
- Ordered left-to-right, top-to-bottom: Gallatin election brawl; Battle of Crooked River; Hawn's Mill massacre; Liberty Jail; Mormons leave Missouri
Date	August 6, 1838 – November 1, 1838
Location	Carroll, Daviess and Caldwell counties in Missouri, U.S.
Result	Anti-Mormon victory: Missouri Executive Order 44

Belligerents
Anti-Mormon vigilantes; Missouri (after the Battle of Crooked River)	Mormons; Missouri (before the Daviess County Expedition)

Commanders and leaders
Samuel Bogart; Thomas Jennings; (Missouri) John Bullock Clark	George M. Hinkle; David W. Patten †; (Missouri) David Rice Atchison; (Missouri) Alexander W. Doniphan

Casualties and losses
1 killed; ~100 displaced	21 killed (including 17 at Haun's Mill massacre); ~10,000 displaced

The 1838 Mormon War (or Missouri Mormon War) was a period of civil unrest in northern Missouri during the summer and fall of 1838 that concluded with the state-mandated expulsion of Mormons (Latter Day Saints) from the state.

Tensions originated in 1831 when Mormons designated Jackson County, Missouri as a gathering place. (Note: In the early 1830s, Mormons operated a dual-center model where Kirtland, Ohio served as the administrative and missionary hub. Jackson County, Missouri was designated as the future "center place of Zion"; however, Mormon leadership initially treated Missouri settlement as a controlled, long-term project. Revelations explicitly cautioned members against rushing to Missouri without authorization or adequate preparations to prevent economic and operational strain.) Violent opposition led to Mormons being forcibly expelled two years later. To prevent further hostilities, the Missouri legislature created Caldwell County as a compromise for displaced Mormon settlers. (Note: The compromise intended to confine Mormon settlement to Caldwell County. The two groups interpreted the boundaries differently. Mormons maintained that they had a constitutional right to purchase land and establish settlements in unorganized counties like Daviess and Carroll, while other settlers understood that Mormons would remain strictly isolated within Caldwell County.) However, the 1837 collapse of the Mormon headquarters in Ohio triggered a wave of migration to the region, reigniting local anxieties over Mormon expansion.

The fragile peace broke on August 6, 1838 during an Election Day brawl in Gallatin. Anti-Mormon vigilantes soon besieged the Mormon town of De Witt; after state militia detachments refused to protect the residents and Governor Lilburn Boggs declined to intervene, the town evacuated. Emboldened by their success, the vigilantes advanced into Daviess County to continue their campaign. Mormons retaliated and launched armed raids across the county. (Note: The Caldwell County militia was organized as the 53rd Regiment of the Missouri State Militia under Colonel George M. Hinkle, a state-commissioned unit. They worked in tandem with the Danites and other volunteer vigilantes.) Following the Battle of Crooked River where Mormons clashed with a state militia unit, Boggs issued Executive Order 44, ordering their expulsion or extermination.

The decree mobilized 2,500 state troops who surrounded Caldwell County. Days later, unauthorized state forces massacred 17 Mormons at Haun's Mill. Mormons surrendered at Far West on November 1. Although a court-martial sentenced Mormon founder Joseph Smith and others to execution by firing squad for treason, Brigadier General Alexander Doniphan defied the command. (Note: The court-martial convened by Major General Samuel D. Lucas was technically illegal and extrajudicial under the Missouri Constitution, as Mormon leaders were civilians and not members of the state militia. This was the basis under which Brigadier General Alexander Doniphan refused to carry the order, which he denounced as "cool-blooded muder".) Smith was instead imprisoned in Liberty Jail until guards allowed his escape in April 1839, joining 10,000 displaced Mormons seeking refuge in Illinois.

== Background ==
Timeline of the 1838 Mormon War
1831	1833 (Jackson County)	1838 (Northwestern Missouri)
January: Oliver Cowdery, Parley P. Pratt, Frederick G. Williams, and other Mormon missionaries arrive in Missouri; June: Mormons begin settling Kaw Township in Jackson County, Missouri; August: Temple Lot dedicated in Independence, Missouri	July: 20th: Evening and Morning Star press (Mormon publication) is destroyed in Jackson County; November: 1st: Mormon storehouse in Independence sacked.; 4th: Battle near the Blue River (3 casualties); Mormons surrender and are expelled from Jackson County.	January: Church of Christ headquarters relocated from Kirtland, Ohio, to Far West, Missouri in Caldwell County.; June: 17th: Salt Sermon; excommunicated Mormon leaders are expelled from Far West by Danites.; July: 4th: Sidney Rigdon's July 4th oration.; August: 6th: Election day battle at Gallatin (start of the war).; October: 1st: Siege of DeWitt. Mormons evacuate the town on the 11th.; 16th: Daviess County expedition.; 23th: Samuel Bogart's state militia unit patrols Bunkham's Strip; takes 3 Mormon prisoners.; 24th: Battle of Crooked River (4 casualties).; 27th: Missouri Executive Order 44 issued, ordering the "extermination" or expulsion of the Mormons from the state.; 29th: Hawn's Mill massacre (17 deaths).; 31st: Siege of Far West; Mormons surrender.; See Aftermath

=== Jackson County, 1831-1833 ===
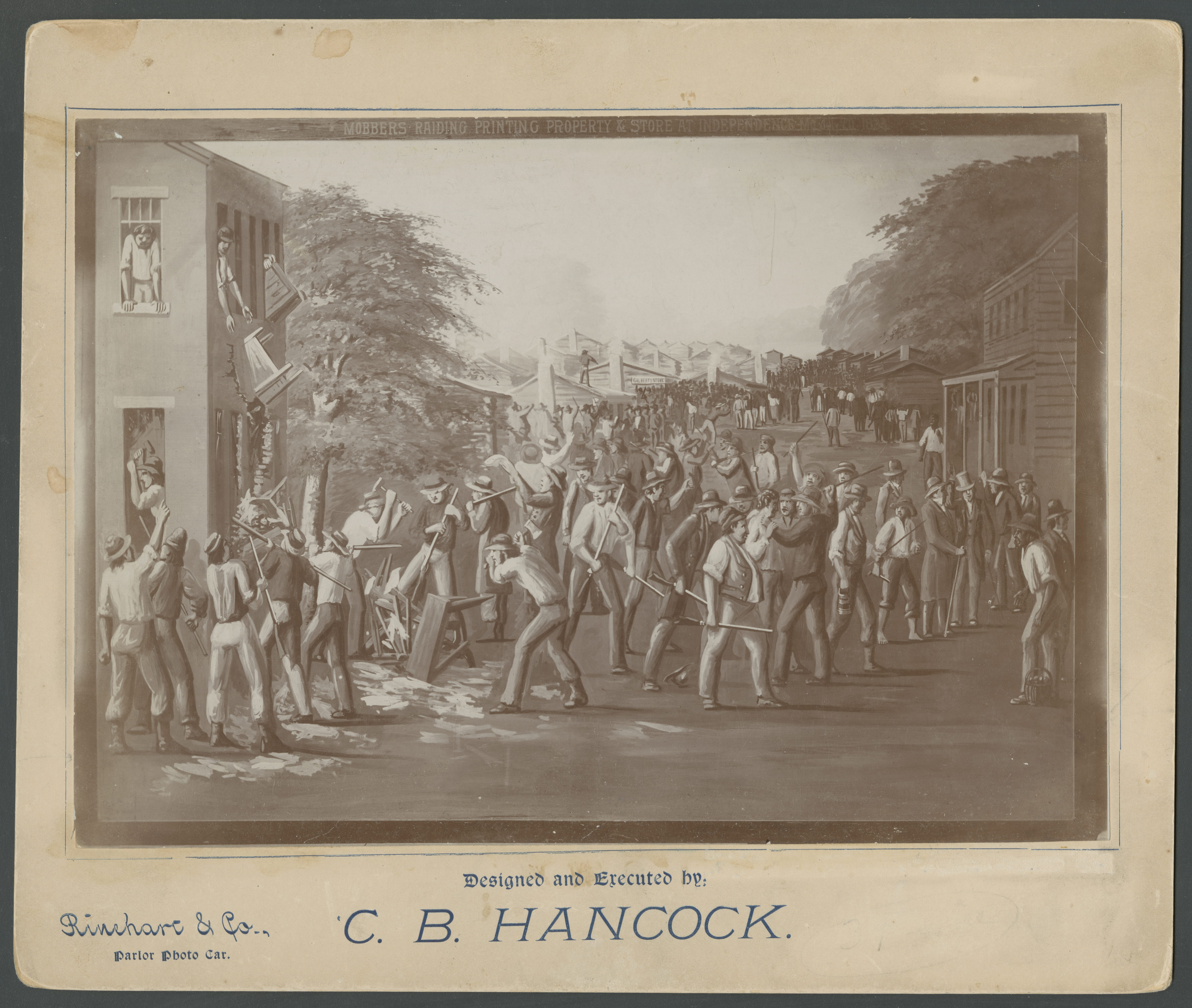
Depiction of the Mormon printing press's destruction in Jackson County. Painting by C.C.A Christensen.

In spring of 1830, Joseph Smith published the Book of Mormon and founded the Church of Christ, a restorationist church. While Smith settled in Kirtland, Ohio, he sent some of his close associates to western Missouri to proselytize among Native Americans. After encountering some moderate success, Mormons began making permanent settlements in Jackson County, Missouri in 1831.

In August 1831, Smith announced that Independence, Missouri and the surrounding area would become the "centerplace" of his planned "City of Zion", a gathering place within Mormon millennial theology. Mormon leadership in Missouri was instructed to make extensive land purchases in the area to be distributed to incoming members.

Under the auspice of Mormon leaders in Kirtland, settlers trickled to the county during the following months. By 1833, Mormons numbered over a thousand, representing about a third and as much as half of the county's population. The Mormon settlers' religious, cultural, and political differences, economic cohesion, their perceived affinity for neighboring Native American tribes, and their divine claims to the land of "Zion" contributed to growing animosity.

Most Latter Day Saint settlers were originally from New England and the Ohio Valley and, unlike their southern neighbors, generally opposed slavery. In July 1833, a local meeting was held by non-Mormon residents in Independence after an article titled "Free People of Color" was published in the Mormon newspaper, The Evening and Morning Star. The article's mention of the potential arrival of free black converts was particularly controversial.

Attendees contended that the Mormons threatened civil society, and that local laws were insufficient to address the perceived dangers. They resolved to remove the Mormons, "peaceably if we can, forcibly if we must." The group then agreed to destroy the newspaper's printing press and demanded that Mormon leaders pledge to halt their activities and leave the county.

When the Mormons refused, they then targeted and ransacked the Mormon storehouse in Independence. Mormon settlements in the outskirts of the city were increasingly harassed and raided throughout the summer and fall of 1833. By November 1833, vigilantes had forcefully expelled the Mormons from Jackson County.

The expulsion from Jackson County informed the patterns of conflict between the Mormons and other Missouri residents over the course of the Mormon war. The expelled Mormons sought refuge in the neighboring counties, especially in Clay County.

Lilburn Boggs, who would later be the Governor of Missouri during the 1838 war, was Lieutenant Governor and a Jackson County resident at the time. Mormon historian Richard Lloyd Anderson would later describe Boggs's role in the early upheavals:

In 1833 Boggs passively saw community leaders and officials sign demands for Mormon withdrawal, and next force a gunbarrel contract to abandon the county before spring planting...anti-Mormon goals were reached in a few simple stages. Executive paralysis permitted terrorism, which forced Mormons to self-defense, which was immediately labeled as an "insurrection", and was put down by the activated militia of the county. Once Mormons were disarmed, mounted squads visited Mormon settlements with threats and enough beatings and destruction of homes to force flight.

=== Caldwell Compromise, 1836–1838 ===
Despite appeals and legal efforts, the non-Mormons in Jackson refused to allow the Mormons to return. Reimbursement for confiscated and damaged property was denied. Mormons refused to sell their lands in the county, hoping that the government would eventually help them reclaim them. In 1834, Mormons attempted to effect a return to Jackson County with a quasi-military expedition known as Zion's Camp, but this effort also failed when the governor did not provide the expected support. Recognizing the need for a more permanent solution, Alexander William Doniphan of the Missouri legislature proposed the creation of a new county specifically for Mormon settlement.

In 1836, the Missouri legislature passed a law establishing Caldwell County, with Far West as its seat. Mormons had already begun buying land in the proposed county, including areas that were carved off to become parts of Ray and Daviess Counties. The Mormons chose a site in the town of Far West to build a temple, which was never finished due to the war. This arrangement brought about a period of relative peace. According to an article in the Elders' Journal, a Latter Day Saint newspaper published in Far West: "the Saints here are at perfect peace with all the surrounding inhabitants, and persecution is not so much as once named among them..." John Corrill, one of the Mormon leaders, remembered:

Friendship began to be restored between (the Mormons) and their neighbors, the old prejudices were fast dying away, and they were doing well, until the summer of 1838

In 1837, problems centered on the Kirtland Safety Society bank at the church's headquarters in Kirtland, Ohio led to schism. The church relocated in January 1838 from Kirtland to Far West, Missouri, which became its new headquarters. Hundreds of Mormon settlers from Kirtland and elsewhere poured into Missouri. They established new colonies outside of Caldwell County, including Adam-ondi-Ahman in Daviess County and De Witt in Carroll County.

In the eyes of many non-Mormon citizens (including Alexander Doniphan), these settlements outside of Caldwell County were a violation of the compromise. The Mormons felt that the compromise only excluded major settlements in Clay and Ray counties, as they already had substantial population centers, but not the recently colonized Daviess and Carroll. The earlier settlers felt politically and economically threatened by the expanding Mormon communities outside of Caldwell County.

=== Salt Sermon and Danites ===
With the Kirtland-based presidency now in control of the Missouri church, a leadership struggle emerged between the Kirtland arrivals and the previously established Missouri church leadership. Many of the oldest and most prominent leaders of the church, including Oliver Cowdery (one of the Three Witnesses and the church's original "second elder"), David Whitmer (another of the Three Witnesses and Stake President of the Missouri Church), John Whitmer, and William W. Phelps, were excommunicated on allegations of misusing church property and finance amid tense relations between them and Smith.

These "dissenters", as they came to be called, owned a significant amount of land in Caldwell County, much of which they purchased when acting as agents of the church. Ownership became unclear and the dissenters threatened the church with lawsuits. The presidency responded by urging the dissenters to leave the county using strong words the dissenters interpreted as threats. In his famous Salt Sermon, Sidney Rigdon announced that the dissenters were as salt that had lost its savor and that it was the duty of the faithful to cast the dissenters out to be trodden beneath the feet of men.

At the same time, Sampson Avard led a group of Mormons to organize a vigilante body known as the Danites. They were named for the Israelite tribe of Dan which is described in Genesis 49:17 thus: "Dan will be a snake by the roadside, a viper along the path, that bites the horse's heels so that its rider tumbles backward." The group's purposes included obeying the church presidency "right or wrong" and expelling the dissenters from Caldwell County. Two days after Rigdon's Salt Sermon, 80 prominent Mormons, including Hyrum Smith, signed the so-called Danite Manifesto, which warned the dissenters to "depart or a more fatal calamity shall befall you." On June 19, the dissenters and their families fled to neighboring counties where their complaints fanned anti-Mormon sentiment.

On July 4, Rigdon gave an oration characterized by Mormon historian Brigham Henry Roberts as a "'Declaration of Independence' from all mobs and persecutions". The text of this speech was endorsed by Joseph Smith, who appeared at the event and participated in the raising of a liberty pole. In the speech, Rigdon declared that the Latter Day Saints would no longer be driven from their homes by persecution from without or dissension from within: "and at mob that comes on us to disturb us, it shall be between us and them a war of extermination; for we will follow them until the last drop of their blood is spilled; or else they will have to exterminate us, for we will carry the seat of war to their own houses and their own families, and one party or the other shall be utterly destroyed".

== Initial clashes ==
=== Election Day Battle at Gallatin ===
Newly-formed Daviess County, Missouri, held its first elections on August 6, 1838. William Peniston, a candidate for the state legislature, referred to the Mormons as "horse-thieves and robbers" and warned them not to vote in the election. Reminding Daviess County residents of the growing electoral power of that community, Peniston claimed in a speech made in Gallatin that if the Missourians "suffer such men as these [Mormons] to vote, you will soon lose your suffrage." Around 200 non-Mormons gathered in Gallatin on election day to prevent them from voting.

When about thirty Mormons approached the polling place, a Missourian named Dick Weldon declared that in Clay County the Mormons had been allowed to vote "no more than the negroes". One of the Mormons present, Samuel Brown, claimed that the statement was false and then declared his intention to vote. This triggered a brawl between the bystanders.

At the start of the brawl, Mormon John Butler let out a call, "Oh yes, you Danites, here is a job for us!" which rallied the Mormons and allowed them to drive off their opponents. The crowd dispersed and the Mormons returned to their homes. This skirmish is often cited as the first episode of serious violence of the Mormon War. Rumor among both parties held that the conflict resulted in casualties. However, when Joseph Smith rode with volunteers to Daviess County to assess the situation, he discovered there was no truth to this.

Non-Mormons began to organize themselves into vigilance committees. When a rumor reached the Mormons that Judge Adam Black was gathering a mob near Millport, Joseph Smith sent Danite leaders Sampson Avrard, Cornelius Lott and Lyman Wight to his home. They surrounded it with one hundred armed men, including Smith's cousin George A. Smith. They asked if this was true, demanding that he sign a document disavowing any connection to the vigilance committees. He refused but, after meeting with Smith, he wrote and signed a document stating that he "is not attached to any mob, nor will attach himself to any such people, and so long as they [the Mormons] will not molest me, I will not molest them." The Mormons also visited Sheriff William Morgan and several other leading Daviess County citizens, forcing some of them to sign statements disavowing any ties to the vigilance committees as well.

At a meeting at Lyman Wight's home between leading Mormons and non-Mormons, both sides agreed not to protect any law-breakers and to surrender all offenders to the authorities. With peace restored, Smith's group returned to Caldwell County. Black later swore an affidavit before the justice of the peace in Daviess county attesting to the treatment and threats he received from George Smith the other church members. On September 7, Smith and Lyman Wight appeared before Judge Austin A. King to answer the charges. Three Danite leaders testified convincingly in their defence. George Robinson asserted that evidence of wrongdoing was insufficient. However Judge King ordered Smith and Wight to stand trial in order to pacify the mob.

=== Mormons expelled from De Witt ===
In the spring of 1838, Henry Root, a non-Mormon and a major landowner in Carroll County, visited Far West and sold his plots in the mostly vacant town of De Witt to Mormons he had invited there. De Witt was strategically located near the confluence of the Grand and the Missouri Rivers. George M. Hinkle and John Murdock, members of the High Council at Far West, were sent to take possession of the town and to begin to colonize it.

==== Carroll County ballot measure ====
On July 30, citizens of Carroll County met in Carrollton to discuss this. The question of whether or not Mormons should be allowed to settle in the county was placed on the August 6 ballot; a heavy majority favored expulsion of the Mormons. A committee sent to De Witt ordered the Mormons to leave. The Mormon leaders refused, citing their right as American citizens to settle where they pleased. Sentiment among the anti-Mormon segment of Carroll County's population hardened, and some began to take up arms. On August 19, 1838, Mormon settler Smith Humphrey reported that 100 armed men led by Colonel William Claude Jones took him prisoner for two hours and threatened him and the rest of the Mormon community.

While Mormons were viewed as a fringe religious group, the sentiment reflected in the Southern Advocate questioned the legitimacy of the vigilante committees:

By what color of propriety a portion of the people of the State, can organize themselves into a body, independent of the civil power, and contravene the general laws of the land by preventing the free enjoyment of the right of citizenship to another portion of the people, we are at a loss to comprehend.

==== Siege of De Witt ====
As tensions built in Daviess County, other counties began to respond to Carroll County's request for assistance in expelling the Mormons from their midst. Citizens in Saline, Howard, Jackson, Chariton, Ray, and other nearby counties organized vigilance committees sympathetic to the Carroll County expulsion party. Some isolated Mormons in outlying areas also came under attack. In Livingston County, a group of armed men forced Asahel Lathrop from his home, where they held his family captive while they were sick. Lathrop wrote "I was compeled [sic] to leave my home my house was thronged with a company of armed men consisting of fourteen in number and they abusing my family in almost every form that Creturs [sic] in the shape of human Beeings [sic] could invent." After more than a week, a company of armed Mormons assisted Lathrop in rescuing his wife and two of his children (one had died while prisoner). Lathrop's wife and remaining children died shortly after their rescue. On September 20, 1838, about one hundred fifty armed men rode into De Witt and demanded that the Mormons leave within ten days. Hinkle and other Mormon leaders informed the men that they would fight. They also sent a request for assistance to Governor Boggs, noting that the mob had threatened "to exterminate them, without regard to age or sex".

On October 1, vigilantes burned the home and stables of Smith Humphrey. Later that day, the vigilantes sealed off the town. The besieged town resorted to butchering whatever loose livestock wandered into town in order to avoid starvation while waiting for the militia or the Governor to come to their aid. General Parks arrived with the Ray County militia on October 6, but his order to disperse was ignored. When his own troops threatened to join the attackers, Parks was forced to withdraw to Daviess County in hopes that the Governor would come to mediate. Parks wrote his superior, General David Rice Atchison, that "a word from his Excellency would have more power to quell this affair than a regiment."

On October 9, A. C. Caldwell returned to De Witt with the Governor's response: "the quarrel was between the Mormons and the mob" and they should fight it out. On October 11, Mormon leaders agreed to abandon the settlement and move to Caldwell County. On the first night of the march out of Carroll County two Mormon women died, one of exposure and the other, a woman named Jenson, in childbirth. Several children also became ill during the ordeal and died later.

== Daviess County violence ==
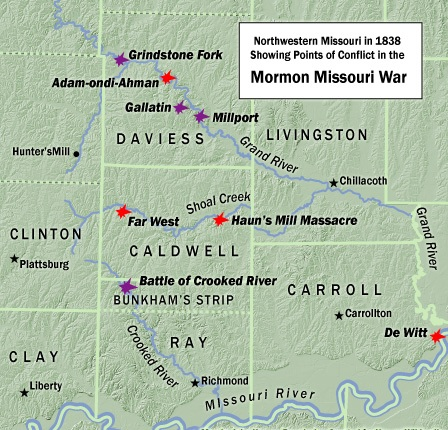
A map of Northwestern Missouri in 1838, showing points of conflict in the Mormon War

=== Vigilante attacks ===
In an October 16 letter, General Atchison relayed to Governor Lilburn Boggs that General Parks reported that "a portion of the men from Carroll County, with one piece of artillery, are on their march for Daviess County, where it is thought the same lawless game is to be played over, and the Mormons to be driven from that county and probably from Caldwell County." Atchison said further, "I would respectfully suggest to your Excellency the propriety of a visit to the scene of excitement in person, or at all events, a strong proclamation" as the only way to restore peace and the rule of law. Boggs, however, ignored this plea as events unravelled.

Meanwhile, a group of vigilantes from Clinton, Platte, and other counties began to harass Mormons in Daviess County, burning outlying homes and plundering property. Latter Day Saint refugees began to flee to Adam-ondi-Ahman for protection and shelter against the upcoming winter. As Joseph Smith returned to Far West in Caldwell County from De Witt in Carroll County to the west General Doniphan informed him of the deteriorating situation. Doniphan already had raised troops to prevent fighting between Mormons and those opposed to them in Daviess County. On Sunday, October 14, a small company of state militia under the command of Colonel William A. Dunn of Clay County arrived in Far West. Dunn, acting on Doniphan's orders, continued on to Adam-ondi-Ahman. Although he was sympathetic to the Mormons' plight, Doniphan reminded the Latter Day Saints that their Caldwell County militia, led by church member Colonel George M. Hinkle, could not legally enter Daviess County. He advised Mormons traveling there to go in small parties and unarmed. Ignoring this counsel, Elias Higbee, a Mormon judge in Caldwell County, called on the Caldwell militia to defend church members' settlements in neighboring Daviess County. They were joined by elements of the Danite vigilante organization.

=== Mormon attacks ===
On October 18, these two groups marched under arms in three groups to Daviess County. Lyman Wight attacked Millport, and David W. Patten attacked Gallatin, both of which had been evacuated before they arrived. Seymour Brunson attacked Grindstone Fork, driving the unarmed Missourians from their homes to make their way to neighboring counties. Having taken control of the Missourian settlements, the Mormons plundered the property and burned the stores and houses. The county seat, Gallatin, was reported to have been "completely gutted" – only one shoe store remained unscathed. Millport, Grindstone Fork and the smaller Missourian settlement of Splawn's Ridge were also plundered and had some houses burned. The plundered goods were deposited in the Bishop's storehouse at Diahman. During the days that followed, Mormon vigilantes under the direction of Lyman Wight drove Missourians who lived in outlying farms from their homes, which were similarly plundered and burned. According to one witness, "We could stand in our door and see houses burning every night for over two weeks... the Mormons completely gutted Daviess County. There was scarcely a Missourian's home left standing in the county. Nearly every one was burned."

The Missourians evicted from their homes were no better prepared than the Mormon refugees had been. After the stress of being expelled from Millport into the snow, Milford Donaho's wife gave birth prematurely, and the child was severely injured during the birth. Even Missourians who had been friendly to the Mormons were not spared. Jacob Stollings, a Gallatin merchant, was reported to have been generous in selling to Mormons on credit, but his store was plundered and burned with the rest. Judge Josiah Morin and Samuel McBrier, both considered friendly to the Mormons, both fled Daviess County after being threatened. McBrier's house was among those burned. When a Mormon band plundered and burned the Taylor home, one young Mormon, Benjamin F Johnson, argued his fellow vigilantes into leaving a horse for a pregnant Mrs Taylor and her children to ride to safety. Ironically, as a result of his kindness, he was the only Mormon who was positively identified to have participated in the home burnings. After several non-Mormons made statements to the authorities that Johnson had acted as a moderating influence on the Danites, he was allowed to escape rather than stand trial.

Many Latter Day Saints were greatly troubled by the occurrences. Mormon leader John Corrill wrote, "the love of pillage grew upon them very fast, for they plundered every kind of property they could get a hold of." Some Mormons claimed that some of the Missourians burned their own homes in order to blame the Mormons. None of these claims, however, purport to be eyewitness accounts. These claims are contradicted by the majority of both Missourian and Latter Day Saint testimony and also by the evidence of the looted property found in the possession of Latter Day Saints. Mormon leader Parley P Pratt conceded that some burnings had been done by Mormons. LeSueur estimates that Mormons were responsible for the burning of fifty homes or shops and the displacement of one hundred non-Mormon families. Millport, which at time was the largest settlement in the county and the center for trade, never recovered from the Mormon burnings, and became a ghost town. Local citizens were outraged by the actions of the Danites and other Mormon bands. Several Mormon homes near Millport were burned and their inhabitants expelled into the snow. Agnes Smith, a sister-in-law of Joseph, was chased from her home with two small children when her home was burned. With one child in each arm, she waded across an icy creek to safety in Adam-ondi-Ahman. Nathan Tanner reported that his militia company rescued another woman and three small children who were hiding in the bushes as their home burned. Other Mormons, fearing similar retribution by the Missourians, gathered into Adam-ondi-Ahman for protection.

Thomas B. Marsh, President of the Quorum of the Twelve Apostles of the church, and fellow Apostle Orson Hyde were alarmed by the events of the Daviess County expedition. On October 19, 1838, the day after Gallatin was burned, Thomas B. Marsh and fellow apostle Orson Hyde left the association of the Church. On October 24, they swore out affidavits concerning the burning and looting in Daviess County. They also reported the existence of the Danite group among the Mormons and repeated a popular rumor that a group of Danites was planning to attack and burn Richmond and Liberty.

== Battle of Crooked River and Mormon Extermination order ==
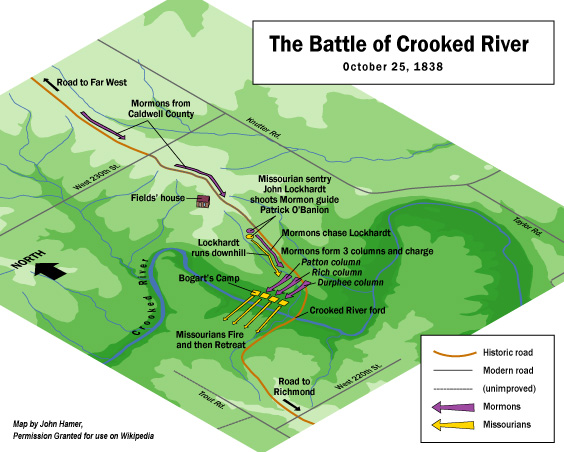
Map illustrating the Battle of Crooked River

Fearing attack, many citizens of Ray County moved their wives and children across the Missouri River for safety. A militia under the command of Samuel Bogart was authorized by General Atchison to patrol the no-man's land between Ray and Caldwell Counties known as "Bunkham's Strip" – a territory 6 miles (9.7 km) east to west and 1-mile (1.6 km) north to south. Instead of staying in the strip, Bogart crossed into Caldwell County and began to disarm Mormons, reportedly threatening to attack Far West. When rumors reached Far West that a mob had taken Mormons prisoner and were threatening to execute them, an armed party was quickly assembled to rescue these prisoners and drive the mob out of the county.

When the Mormons arrived on the scene, the militia was camped along Crooked River in the Bunkham's Strip just south of Caldwell County. After a militia sentry shot at the crowd, the Mormons divided into three columns led by David W. Patten, Charles C. Rich, and James Durphee. The militia broke ranks and fled across the river. Although Mormons won the battle, they took heavier casualties than the militia, only one of whom, Moses Rowland, was killed. On the Mormon side, Gideon Carter was killed in the battle and nine other Mormons were wounded, including Patten, who soon after died from his wounds. According to one Mormon witness, the deaths "threw a gloom over the whole place".

News of the battle quickly spread and contributed to an all-out panic in northwestern Missouri. Exaggerated initial reports indicated that nearly all of Bogart's company had been killed. Generals Atchison, Doniphon and Parks decided they needed to call out the militia to "prevent further violence". In a letter to US Army Colonel R. B. Mason of Ft. Leavenworth, they expressed:

The citizens of Daviess, Carroll, and some other counties have raised mob after mob for the last two months for the purpose of driving a group of Mormons from those counties and from the State.

Missouri vigilantes continued to act on their own, driving Mormons inward to Far West and Adam-ondi-Ahman. Meanwhile, exaggerated reports from the Battle of Crooked River made their way to Missouri's governor, Lilburn Boggs. Boggs was considered more adversarial towards the Mormons than his predecessor, and, as Lieutenant Governor, had sided with the vigilantes who had expelled the Mormons from Jackson County in 1833. Boggs mustered 2,500 state militiamen to put down what he considered a Mormon insurrection against the state. Possibly playing on Rigdon's July 4 sermon that talked of a "war of extermination", Boggs issued Missouri Executive Order 44, also known as the "Extermination Order", on October 27, which stated that "the Mormons must be treated as enemies, and must be exterminated or driven from the State if necessary for the public peace..." The Extermination Order was officially rescinded on June 25, 1976, by Governor Christopher Samuel "Kit" Bond.

== Hawn's Mill Massacre ==
Agitation against the Latter Day Saints had become particularly fierce in the sparsely settled counties north and east of Caldwell County. Mormon dissenters from Daviess County who had fled to Livingston County reportedly told Livingston County militia under Colonel Thomas Jennings that Mormons were gathering at Hawn's Mill to mount a raid into Livingston County. One 19th century Missouri historian noted:

The Daviess County men were very bitter against the Mormons, and vowed the direst vengeance on the entire sect. It did not matter whether or not the Mormons at [Haun's] mill had taken any part in the disturbance which had occurred [in Daviess County]; it was enough that they were Mormons. The Livingston men became thoroughly imbued with the same spirit, and were eager for the raid ... feel[ing] an extraordinary sympathy for the outrages suffered by their neighbors

Although it had just been issued, little evidence exists that the governor's "Extermination Order" had reached the attackers. None of the participants in the raid cited the order as justification for their actions.

On October 29, this large vigilante band of about 250 men assembled and entered eastern Caldwell County. When the Missourian raiders approached the settlement on the afternoon of October 30, some 30 to 40 Latter Day Saint families were living or encamped there. Despite an attempt by the Mormons to parley, the mob attacked. Thomas McBride surrendered his rifle to Jacob Rogers, who shot McBride with his own gun. When McBride held out a hand, Rogers cut it off with a corn knife, then may have further mangled his body while McBride was still alive. Other members of the mob opened fire, which sent the Mormons fleeing in all directions.

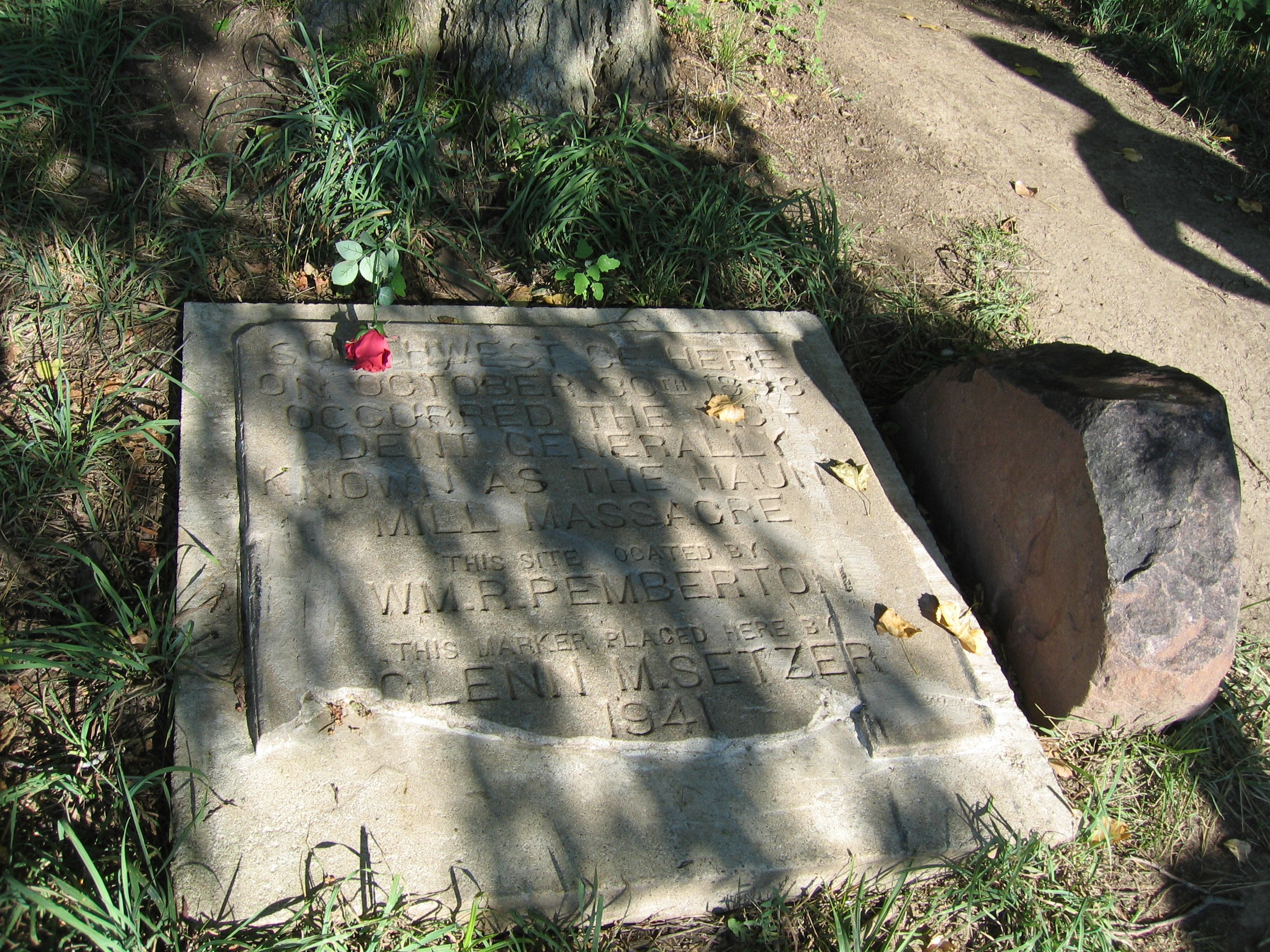
Haun's Mill marker

While Mormon women and children scattered and hid in the surrounding woods and nearby homes, Mormon men and boys rallied to defend the settlement. They moved into a blacksmith shop, which they hoped to use as a makeshift defensive fortification. However, the shop had large gaps between the logs which the Missourians shot into and, as one Mormon later recalled, it became more "slaughter-house rather than a shelter". After firing at the shop for half an hour, some of the Missourians entered to kill the survivors. They found 10-year-old Sardius Smith hiding behind the bellows. William Reynolds of Livingston County shot and killed the boy, saying: "Nits will make lice, and if he had lived he would have become a Mormon" 17 were killed in total. When survivors of the massacre reached Far West, the reports of the savagery of the attack played a significant part in the decision of the Mormons to surrender. No Missourians were ever prosecuted for their role in the Hawn's Mill Massacre.

== Siege of Far West and capture of Mormon leaders ==
Most Mormons gathered to Far West and Adam-ondi-Ahman for protection. Major General Samuel D. Lucas marched the state militia to Far West and laid siege to the Mormon headquarters on 1 November. Surrounded by the state militia, Joseph Smith ordered Colonel George M. Hinkle, the head of the Mormon militia in Caldwell County, to ride out and meet with General Lucas to seek terms. According to Hinkle, Smith wanted a treaty with the Missourians "on any terms short of battle". Other Latter Day Saint witnesses remembered that Smith said to "beg like a dog for peace".

Lucas' terms were one-sided. The Mormons were to give up their leaders for trial and to surrender all of their arms. Every Mormon who had taken up arms was to sell his property to pay for the damages to Missourian property and for the muster of the state militia. Finally, the Mormons who had taken up arms were to leave the state. Colonel Hinkle stated that the Mormons would help bring to justice those who had violated the law, but he protested that the other terms were illegal and unconstitutional.

Colonel Hinkle rode to the church leaders in Far West and informed them of the offered terms. According to Mormon witness Reed Peck, when Smith was told that the Mormons would be expected to leave the state, he replied that "he did not care" and that he would be glad to get out of the "damnable state" anyway. Smith and the other leaders rode with Hinkle back to the Missouri militia encampment. The militia promptly arrested Smith and the other leaders. Smith believed that Hinkle had betrayed him, but Hinkle maintained his innocence and claimed that he was following Smith's orders. To William Wines Phelps, a fellow Mormon and witness to the events, Hinkle wrote: "When the facts were laid before Joseph, did he not say, 'I will go'; and did not the others go with him, and that, too, voluntarily, so far as you and I were concerned?"

Joseph Smith and the other arrested leaders were held overnight under guard in General Lucas' camp. Hyrum Smith, Brigham Young, and other leaders left at Far West warned the veterans of Crooked River to flee. "If found, they will be shot down like dogs," warned Hyrum. Joseph Smith attempted to negotiate with Lucas, but Lucas considered his conditions to be non-negotiable. At 8:00 am, Joseph sent word to Far West to surrender. Ebenezer Robinson described the scene at Far West:

General Clark made the following speech to the brethren on the public square: "... The orders of the governor to me were, that you should be exterminated, and not allowed to remain in the state, and had your leaders not been given up, and the terms of the treaty complied with, before this, you and your families would have been destroyed and your houses in ashes."

The Far West militia was marched out of the city and forced to turn over their weapons to General Lucas. The men under the command of Lucas were then allowed to ransack the city to search for weapons. Brigham Young recounts that, once the militia was disarmed, Lucas's men were turned loose on the city:

[T]hey commenced their ravages by plundering the citizens of their bedding, clothing, money, wearing apparel, and every thing of value they could lay their hands upon, and also attempting to violate the chastity of the women in sight of their husbands and friends, under the pretence of hunting for prisoners and arms. The soldiers shot down our oxen, cows, hogs and fowls, at our own doors, taking part away and leaving the rest to rot in the streets. The soldiers also turned their horses into our fields of corn.

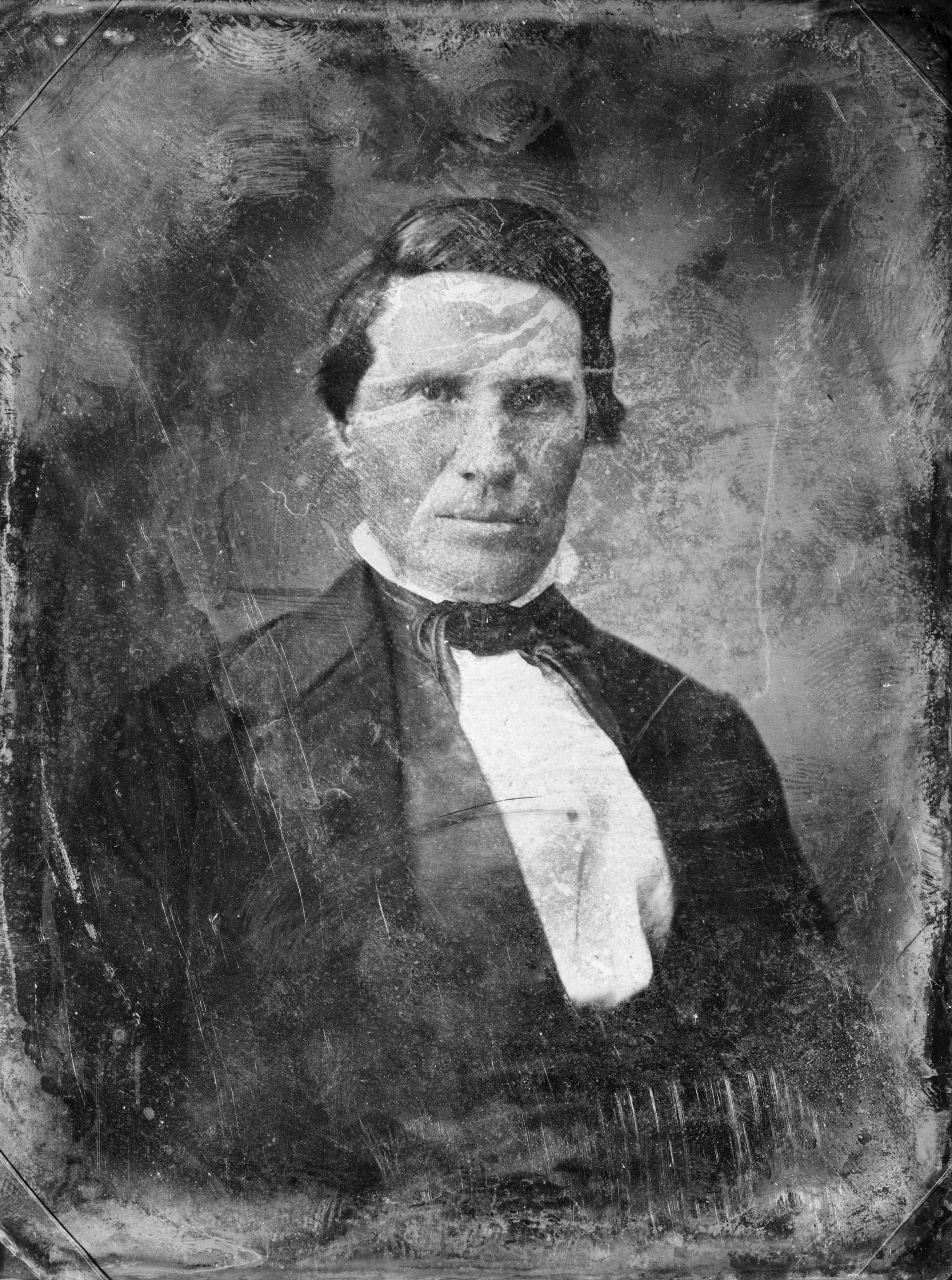
Alexander William Doniphan, the man who refused to execute the Mormon leaders

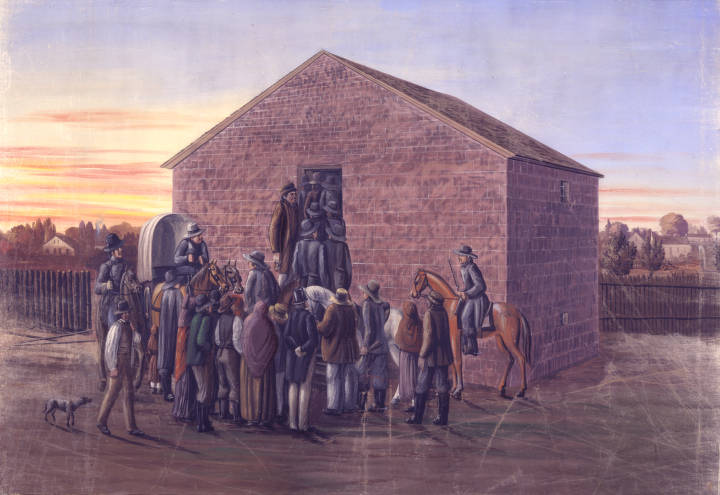
Liberty Jail by C.C.A Christensen

Lucas tried Joseph Smith and other Mormon leaders by court martial on November 1, the evening of the surrender. After the court martial, he ordered General Alexander William Doniphan:

You will take Joseph Smith and the other prisoners into the public square of Far West and shoot them at 9 o'clock tomorrow morning.

Doniphan refused to obey the order, replying:

It is cold-blooded murder. I will not obey your order. My brigade shall march for Liberty to-morrow morning, at 8 o'clock, and if you execute those men, I will hold you responsible before an earthly tribunal, so help me God!

The defendants, consisting of about 60 men including Joseph Smith and Sidney Rigdon, were turned over to a civil court of inquiry in Richmond under Judge Austin A. King, on charges of treason, murder, arson, burglary, robbery, larceny and perjury. The court of inquiry began November 12, 1838. After the inquiry, most of the Mormon prisoners were released, but Joseph Smith, Sidney Rigdon, Lyman Wight, Caleb Baldwin, Hyrum Smith and Alexander McRae were held in the Liberty Jail in Liberty, Clay County on charges of treason against the state, murder, arson, burglary, robbery and larceny.

During a transfer to another prison in the spring of 1839, Smith and the other prisoners escaped. The exact circumstances that allowed for him to escape are not certain. John Whitmer suggests that Smith bribed the guards. Historian Richard Bushman believes that Smith's imprisonment had become an embarrassment, and that an escape would be convenient for Boggs and the rest of the Missouri political establishment. Smith and the other Mormons resettled in Nauvoo, Illinois, beginning in 1839.

Daviess County residents were outraged by the escape of Smith and the other leaders. William Bowman, one of the guards, was dragged by his hair across the town square. Sheriff Morgan was ridden through town on an iron bar, and died shortly afterward from the injuries he suffered during the ride.

== Aftermath ==
General Clark viewed Executive Order 44 as having been fulfilled by the agreement of the Mormons to evacuate the state the following spring. The militia was disbanded in late November. Missouri blamed the Mormons for the conflict and forced the Mormons to sign over all their lands in order to pay for the state militia muster. Mormon leaders appealed to the state legislature to overturn the requirement that they leave the state, but the legislature tabled the issue until a date well after that when the Mormons would have left the state.

Having surrendered the bulk of their firearms, Mormons were left nearly defenseless against the mobs. Mormon residents were harassed and attacked by angry residents who were no longer restrained by militia officers. Judge Austin A King, who had been assigned the cases of the Mormons charged with offenses during the conflict, warned "If you once think to plant crops or to occupy your lands any longer than the first of April, the citizens will be upon you: they will kill you every one, men, women and children."

=== Flight of Mormons to Illinois ===
Stripped of their property, most refugees made their way east to Illinois, where residents of the town of Quincy helped them. When faced with the Mormon refugees from Missouri, the people of Quincy were outraged by the treatment the Mormons had experienced. One resolution passed by the Quincy town council read:

Resolved: That the gov of Missouri, in refusing protection to this class of people when pressed upon by an heartless mob, and turning upon them a band of unprincipled Militia, with orders encouraging their extermination, has brought a lasting disgrace upon the state over which he presides.

Eventually, the Mormons purchased and settled the mostly vacant city of Commerce, north of Quincy, which they renamed Nauvoo in 1839.

=== Political fallout ===
Many of Boggs's constituents felt that he had mismanaged the situation by failing to intervene earlier in the crisis, and then by overreacting on the basis of partial and incorrect information. The Missouri Argus published an editorial on December 20, 1838, arguing that the Mormons should not be permitted to be forcibly expelled from the state:

They cannot be driven beyond the limits of the state—that is certain. To do so, would be to act with extreme cruelty. Public opinion has recoiled from a summary and forcible removal of our negro population;—much more likely will it be to revolt at the violent expulsion of two or three thousand souls, who have so many ties to connect them with us in a common brotherhood. If they choose to remain, we must be content. The day has gone by when masses of men can be outlawed, and driven from society to the wilderness, unprotected. ... The refinement, the charity of our age, will not brook it.

Even people who otherwise expressed no sympathy towards the Mormons disapproved of Boggs's order and the treatment of the Mormons by the mobs. One contemporary critic of the Mormons wrote:

Mormonism is a monstrous evil; and the only place where it ever did or ever could shine, this side of the world of despair, is by the side of the Missouri mob.

LeSueur notes that, along with other setbacks, Boggs's mishandling of the Mormon conflict left him "politically impotent" by the end of his term.

=== Boggs assassination attempt ===
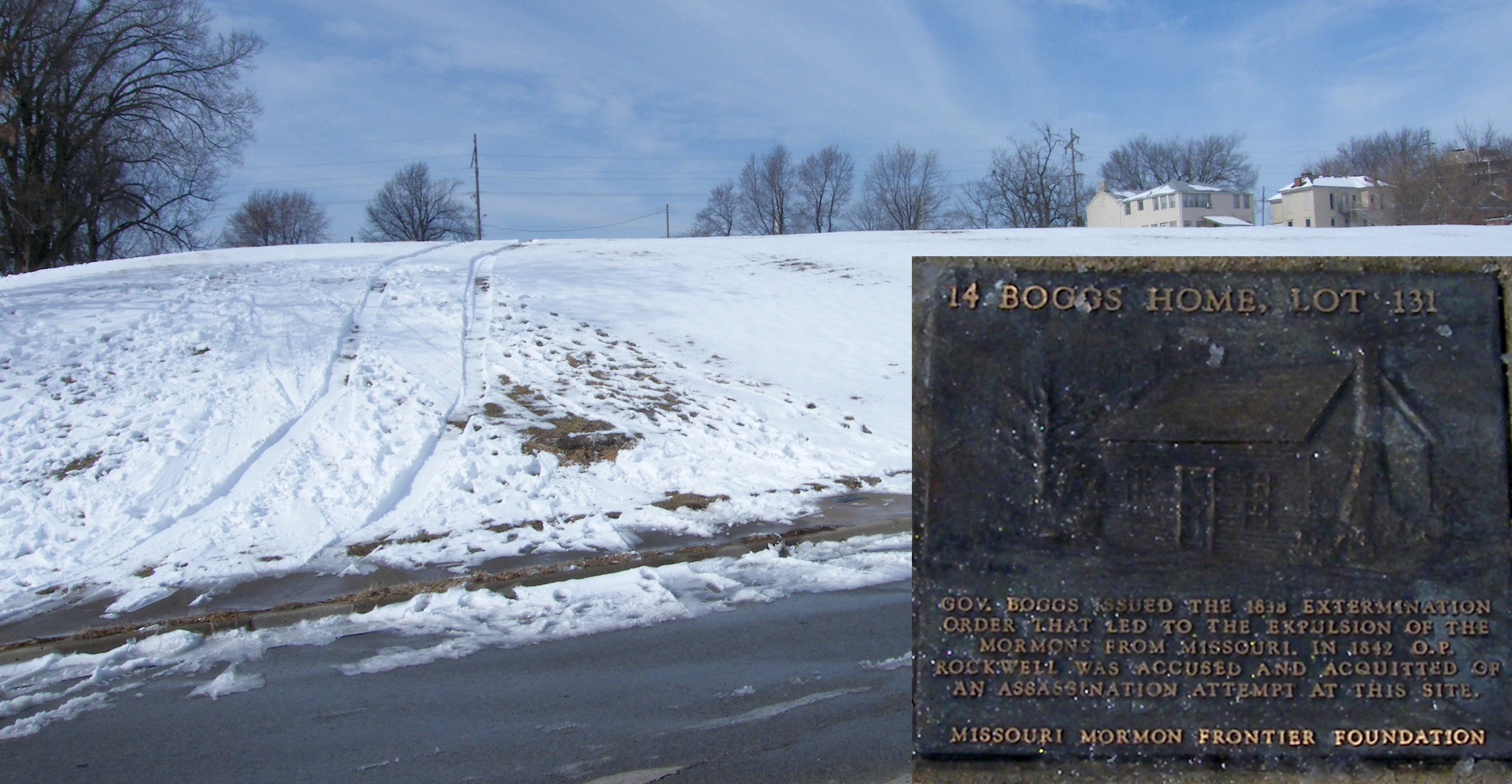
Lilburn Boggs' assassination attempt site

On May 6, 1842, Boggs was shot in the head at his home three blocks from Temple Lot. Boggs survived, but Mormons came under immediate suspicion, especially Orrin Porter Rockwell, bodyguard of Joseph Smith. Sheriff J.H. Reynolds discovered a revolver at the scene, still loaded with buckshot. He surmised that the perpetrator had fired upon Boggs and lost his firearm in the night when the weapon recoiled due to its unusually large shot. The gun was found to have been stolen from a local shopkeeper, who identified "that hired man of Ward's" as the most likely culprit. Reynolds determined the man in question was Rockwell.

John C. Bennett, a disaffected Mormon, reported that Smith had offered a cash reward to anyone who would assassinate Boggs, and that Smith had admitted to him that Rockwell had done the deed. Joseph Smith denied Bennett's account, speculating that Boggs—who was campaigning for state senate—was attacked by an election opponent. One historian notes that Governor Boggs was running for election against several violent men, all capable of the deed, and that there was no particular reason to suspect Rockwell of the crime. Other historians are convinced that Rockwell was involved in the shooting. The following year, Rockwell was arrested, tried, and acquitted of the attempted murder, after a grand jury was unable to find sufficient evidence to indict him, although most of Boggs' contemporaries remained convinced of his guilt. Rockwell famously stated that he "never shot at anybody, if I shoot they get shot!... He's still alive, ain't he?"

=== Mormon reddress petitions ===
Mormons reported threats of sexual violence, attempts to commit it and actual acts of rape perpetrated on Mormon women. Ruth Napier (whose husband William was killed in the massacre) swore before a justice of the peace that, in early November, after the Haun's Mill Massacre, armed non-Mormons billeted themselves in her home without her consent while she was living there as a widow with small children. One night as she was sleeping one of the men came to her bed and fondled her. She was so frightened she made some sort of commotion and crawled over her children to get away. He retreated and tried nothing more that night.

Elijah Reed similarly swore before a clerk of the circuit court that, fleeing for his life from a group of armed Missouri settlers, he took shelter with the Jameson family (here spelled "Jimmison"). On October 29, a group of Missourians came to the house, demanding entrance or they would break down the door. Mr. Jimmison answered the door while Reed hid under a bed. The men, identifying themselves as soldiers, said they had come to take Mr. Jimmison away. As Jimmison was taken to get a horse for him to ride away with them, he broke free and escaped. They returned to the house and began to assault Mrs. Jimmison, preparing to rape her as Reed witnessed this from under the bed. According to Reed, they stopped fondling her after she cried and begged for them to do so.

Hyrum Smith stated under oath before a municipal judge that after the skirmishes that destroyed houses and farmlands, the Mormon leadership sent a message to General Atchison and expected an army to provide protection for them. The army that arrived the evening of October 30 was led by General Doniphan and the far less friendly General Lucas, who had already murdered Mormons in the area in 1833 and 1834. The next day the Mormon leaders and men of Far West were lured to a cornfield on the pretext of a consultation with the generals and officers but they were surrounded and taken prisoner. November 1, the armed soldiers patrolling the streets of Far West were permitted enter homes, molest the people at their leisure, confiscate the firearms and ravish (rape) the women there.

Parley P. Pratt attested before a municipal judge that he was among the group with Joseph Smith who were taken prisoner in the corn field. He said that while imprisoned, their guards named a couple of female Mormons and claimed that about twenty or thirty soldiers had tied the women down and raped them.

The account John Murdock recorded in his journal reflects what Pratt and Smith avowed, adding that the rapes and abuse continued for as long as the Mormons remained in Missouri.

== See also ==
- Border Ruffian
- Illinois Mormon War (1844–1845)
- Latter Day Saint martyrs
- List of conflicts in the United States
- Missouri Executive Order 44 (1838 Missouri)
- Expulsion of Mormons from Jackson County, Missouri (1833)
- Mormon Exodus (1846–1857)
- Utah War (1857–1858)
