= Missouri Executive Order 44 =

Expulsion order of Mormons from Missouri in 1838

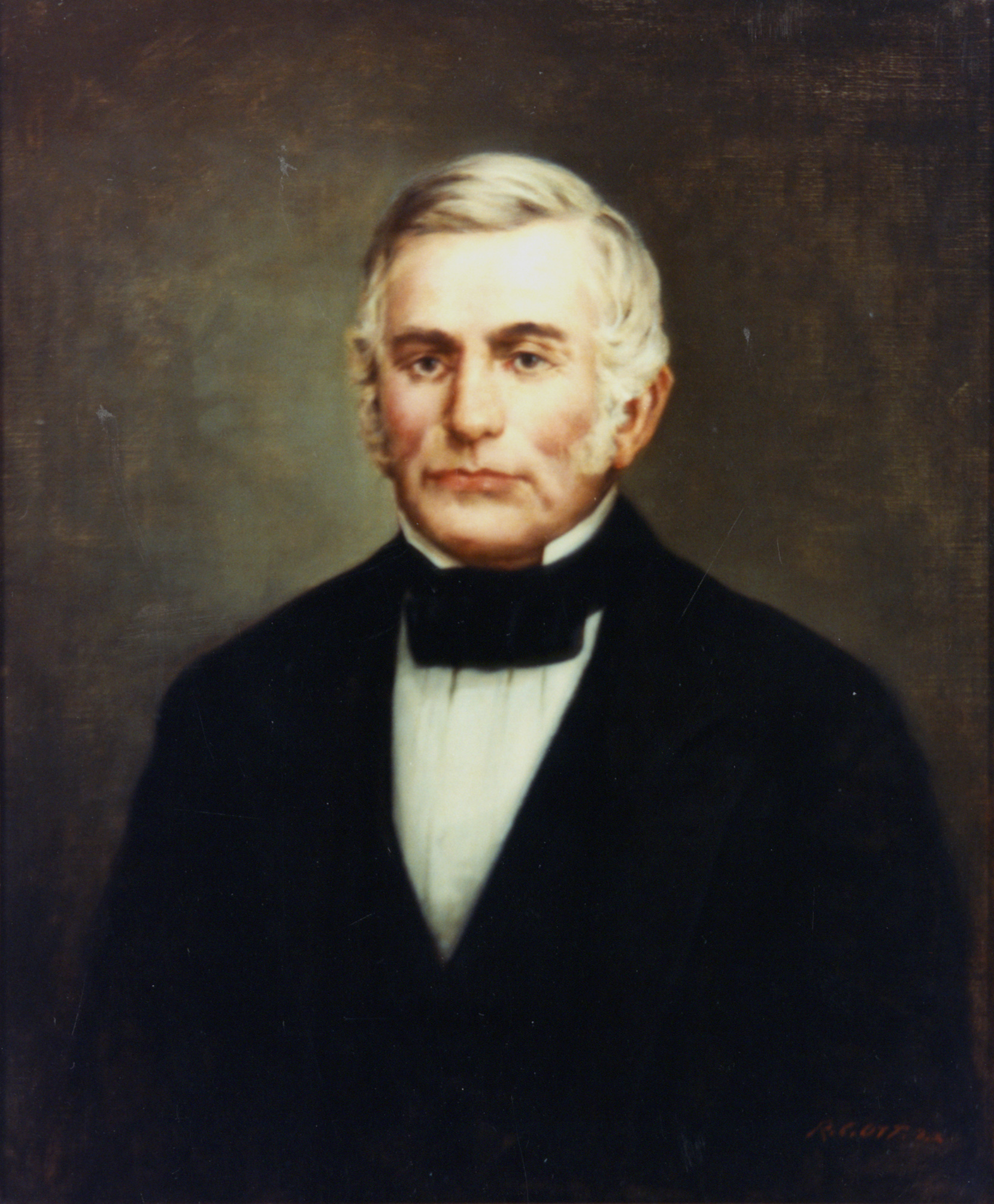
Governor Lilburn Boggs, who issued the order

Missouri Executive Order 44 (known as the Mormon Extermination Order) was a state executive order issued by Missouri Governor Lilburn Boggs on October 27, 1838, in response to the Battle of Crooked River. The clash had been triggered when a state militia unit from Ray County seized several Mormon hostages from Caldwell County, and the subsequent attempt by the Mormons to rescue them.

Based on exaggerated reports of the battle and rumors of Mormon military plans, Boggs claimed that the Mormons had committed "open and avowed defiance of the law" and had "made war upon the people of Missouri". Governor Boggs directed that "the Mormons must be treated as enemies, and must be exterminated or driven from the State if necessary for the public peace—their outrages are beyond all description".

The order was directed to General John Bullock Clark, and it was implemented by the state militia to forcefully displace the Mormons from Missouri. In response to the order, the Mormons surrendered and subsequently sought refuge in Nauvoo, Illinois. In 1976, citing its unconstitutional nature, Missouri governor Kit Bond formally rescinded it.

== Background ==
The relationship between the Mormons and the state of Missouri had its roots in 1830, when a group of missionaries were sent to western Missouri with the goal of proselytizing among the Native Americans. This group arrived in Jackson County, Missouri, and initially encountered a welcoming response from some residents who were receptive to their message. In summer of 1831, Jackson County was designated as the place of Zion, a sacred site where Mormons believed they would eventually gather and prepare for the Second Coming of Jesus Christ. However, as the number of Mormons in the area grew, tensions emerged between the Mormons and their non-Mormon neighbors. This was partly due to the religious and cultural differences between the two groups, economic competition, political differences, and fears of cultural displacement.

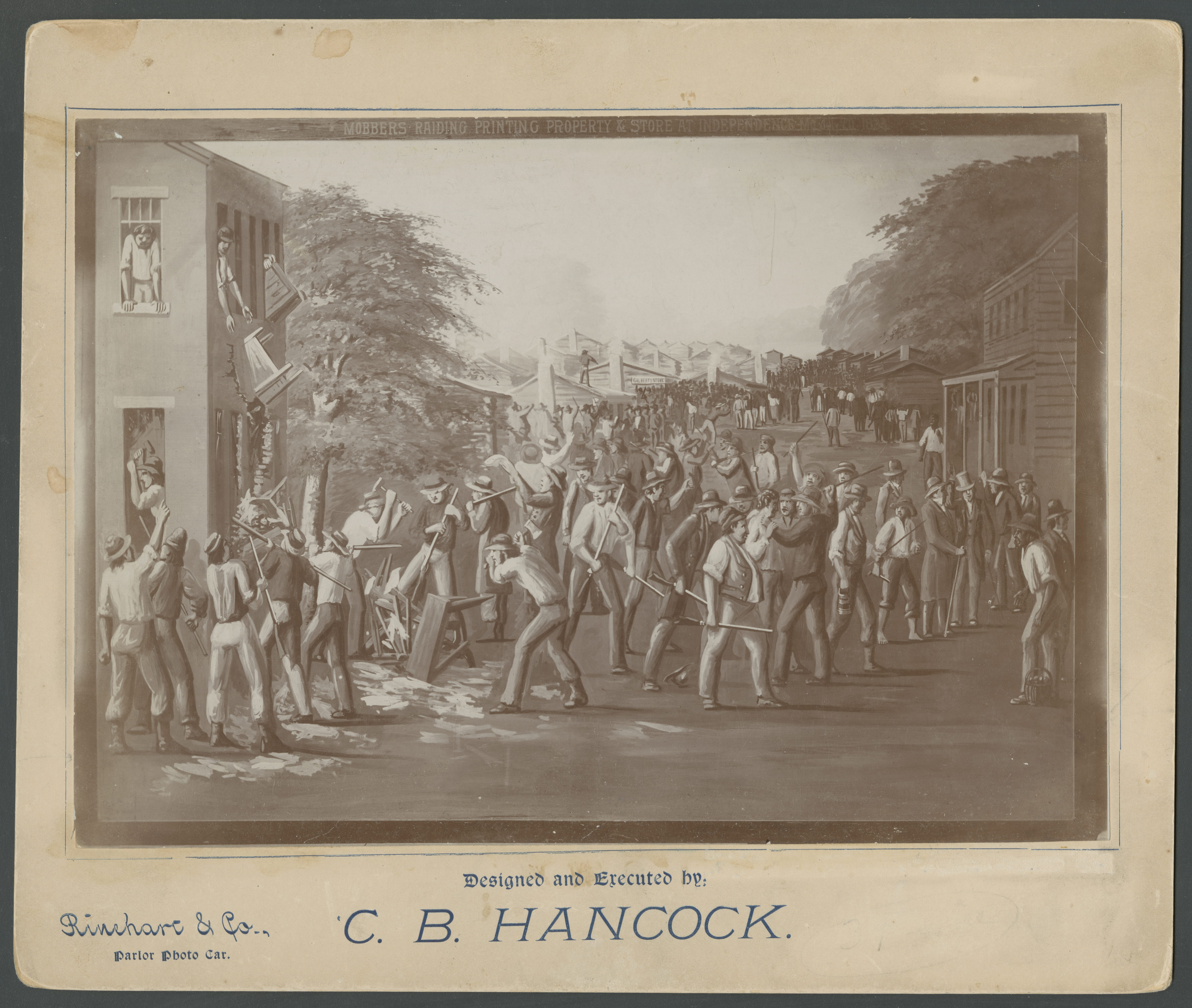
Destruction of the Printing Press, by C. C. A. Christensen

Tensions reached a boiling point in summer of 1833, when two newspaper articles discussing Missouri laws concerning slavery were published by the Mormon newspaper, the Evening and the Morning Star in Independence, Missouri. These articles were interpreted by Missourians as inviting free blacks to settle in the county. Residents of Jackson County, including several public officials, published a manifesto accusing the Mormons of having a "corrupting influence" on their slaves, and calling for their removal: "peaceably if we can, forcibly if we must." On the same day, July 20, 1833, the W. W. Phelps' printing press, which published the newspaper in Independence, was destroyed by a mob.

Mormons were given a county of their own—Caldwell County—in 1836, following their expulsion from Jackson County in 1833. However, the increasing influx of new converts moving to northwestern Missouri led them to begin settling in adjacent counties. Other settlers, who had operated under the assumption that Mormons would remain confined to Caldwell County, became angry due to these new settlements.

On July 4, 1838, First Presidency member Sidney Rigdon delivered an oration in Far West, the county seat of Caldwell County. Rigdon wanted to make clear that Mormons would meet any attacks on them with force. Far from settling tensions, Rigdon's oration had the opposite effect: it terrified and inflamed the residents of surrounding counties. By the fall of that same year these tensions escalated into open conflict, culminating in the siege of the Mormon settlement in Carroll County, the sacking and burning of Gallatin by the Danites, and the taking of Mormon hostages by Captain Samuel Bogart and his state militia unit, operating in northern Ray County (to the south of Caldwell).

A Mormon armed group from the town of Far West moved south to the militia camp on the Crooked River in order to rescue the hostages, causing rumors of a planned full-scale invasion of Missouri that ran rampant and aroused terror throughout the western part of the state. These rumors only increased as reports of the Battle of Crooked River reached the capital at Jefferson City, with exaggerated accounts of Mormons supposedly slaughtering Bogart's militia company, including those who had surrendered. Further dispatches spoke of an impending attack on Richmond, county seat of Ray County, though in fact no such attack was ever contemplated.

Previously, Governor Boggs had received word that Mormons had driven several citizens of Daviess County (north of Caldwell) from their homes. He had then appointed General John Bullock Clark to lead the State Militia in assisting those citizens to return. But after hearing these reports, Governor Boggs issued new orders directing Clark to commence direct military operations and issued Missouri Executive Order 44.

== Enforcement ==
General Clark cited Executive Order 44 soon after the Mormon settlers surrendered in November 1838, saying that violence would have been used had they chosen not to surrender.

...The order of the governor was to me, that you should be exterminated, and not allowed to remain in the state; and had not your leaders been given up, and the terms of this treaty complied with, your families before this time would have been destroyed, and your houses in ashes. There is a discretionary power vested in my hands, which concerning your circumstances I will exercise for a season...

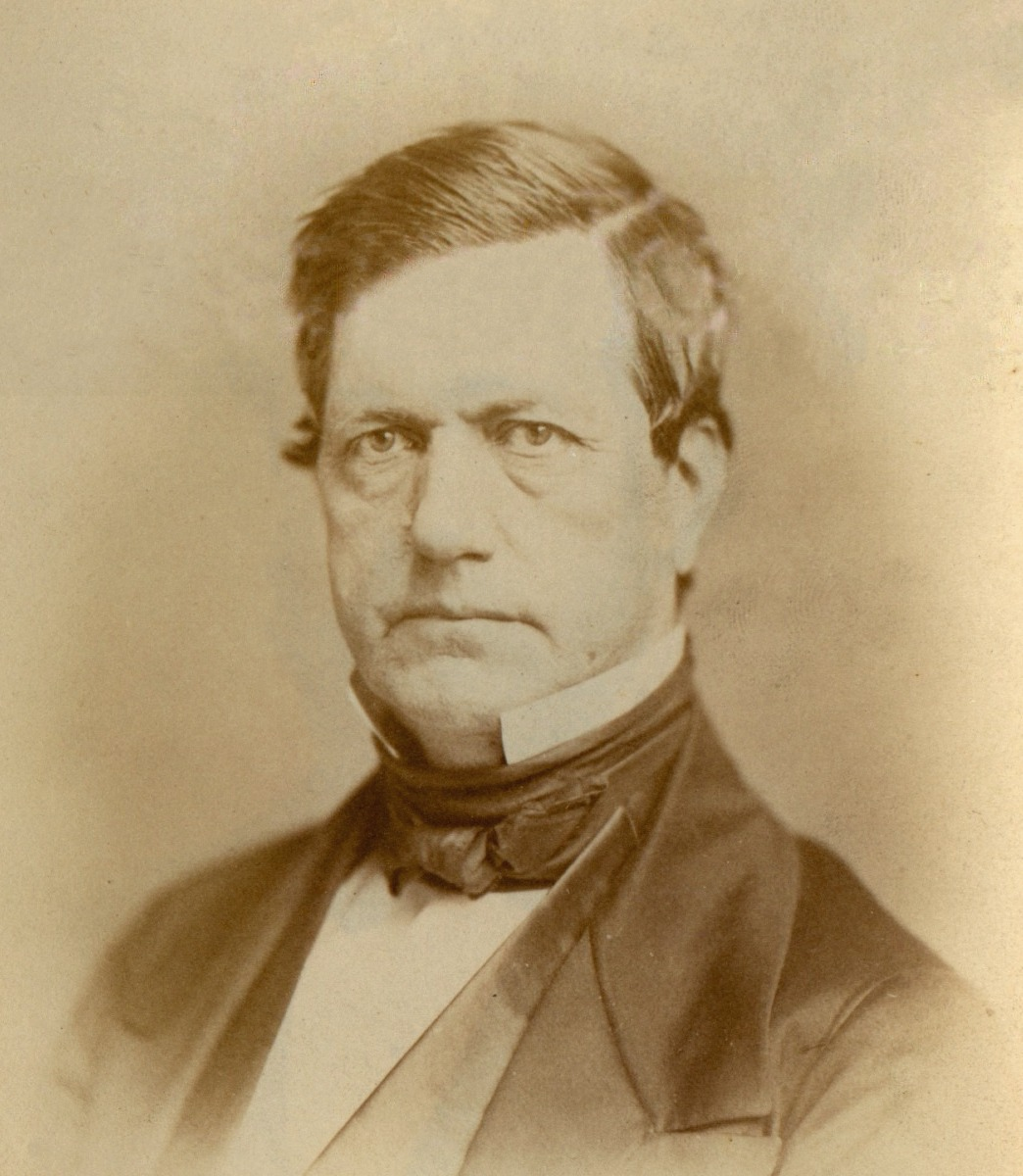
General John Bullock Clark, to whom Governor Boggs addressed the Order

General Clark explicitly stated that the Mormons should expect no mercy and that their leaders would not be returned to them. Clark furthermore stated:

I do not say you shall go now, but you must not think of staying here another season, or of putting in crops, for the moment you do this, the citizens will be upon you; and if I am called here again, in a case of a non-compliance of a treaty made, do not think I will do as I have now. You need not expect any mercy, but extermination, for I am determined the governor's orders be executed. As for your leaders, do not think, do not imagine for a moment, do not let it enter into your mind, that they will be delivered and restored to you again, for their fate is fixed, their die is cast, their doom is sealed.

Consequently, approximately 15,000 Mormons promptly fled to Illinois, enduring the harsh winter conditions.

=== Deaths ===
While the term extermination was used in the order, Boggs would claim later in his life that his main desire was to subdue the Mormons without bloodshed. Historians Alexander L. Baugh and Steven LeSueur suggest the word 'exterminate' reflects the historical usage of the term, which more broadly encompassed the expulsion or removal of a group or population from an area.

The question of whether anyone was directly killed as a result of the Extermination Order between its issuance on October 27, 1838, and the Mormon surrender on November 1, 1838, has been a subject of intense historical debate. The prevailing consensus among scholars is that there is insufficient evidence to suggest that militiamen invoked the order to justify their actions during that period.

==== Haun's Mill ====
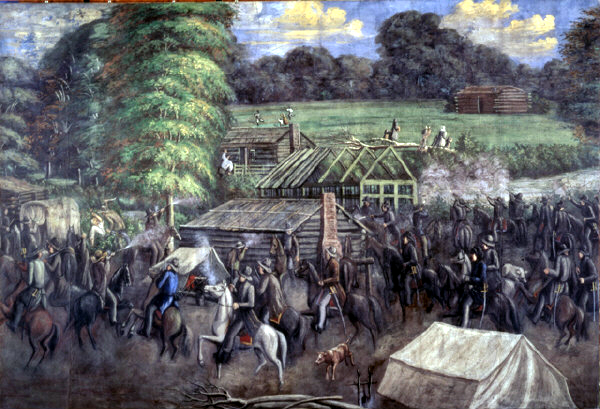
Haun's Mill by C. C. A. Christensen

The Haun's Mill massacre took place on October 30, 1838, three days after the order. It was perpetrated by Missouri State Guardsmen from Livingston County on the settlement of Haun's Mill, located in eastern Caldwell County near the Livingston County border. It resulted in the deaths of 18 people. While most scholars state there is little evidence that the militiamen knew of the Executive Order, there is at least one first-hand account, published in 1877, claiming the perpetrators cited the governor's ordering their extermination as the motive of the massacre.

"Halt!" commanded the leader of a band of well-mounted and well-armed mobocrats, who charged down upon them as they journeyed on their way.

"If you proceed any farther west," said the captain, "you will be instantly shot."

"Wherefore?" inquired the pilgrims.

"You are d__d Mormons!"

"We are law-abiding Americans, and have given no cause of offence."

"You are d__d Mormons. That's offense enough. Within ten days every Mormon must be out of Missouri, or men, women, and children will be shot down indiscriminately. No mercy will be shown. It is the order of the Governor that you should all be exterminated; and by God you will be."

=== Financial losses ===
To date, there have been no reparations or other financial compensation for losses by either side in the conflict. Historian William Alexander Linn wrote:

What the total of the pecuniary losses of the members of the Mormons in Missouri was cannot be accurately estimated. They asserted that in Jackson County alone, $120,000 worth of their property was destroyed, and that fifteen thousand of their number fled from the state. Smith, in a statement of his losses made after his arrival in Illinois, placed them at $1,000,000. In a memorial presented to Congress at this time the losses in Jackson County were placed at $175,000, and in the state of Missouri at $2,000,000. The efforts of Mormons to secure redress were long continued. Not only was Congress appealed to, but legislatures of other states were urged to petition in their behalf. The Senate committee at Washington reported that the matter was entirely within the jurisdiction of the state of Missouri. One of the latest appeals was addressed by Smith at Nauvoo in December, 1843, to his native state, Vermont, calling on the Green Mountain boys, not only to assist him in attaining justice in Missouri, but also to humble and chastise or abase her for the disgraces she has brought upon constitutional liberty, until she atones for her sin.

== Aftermath ==
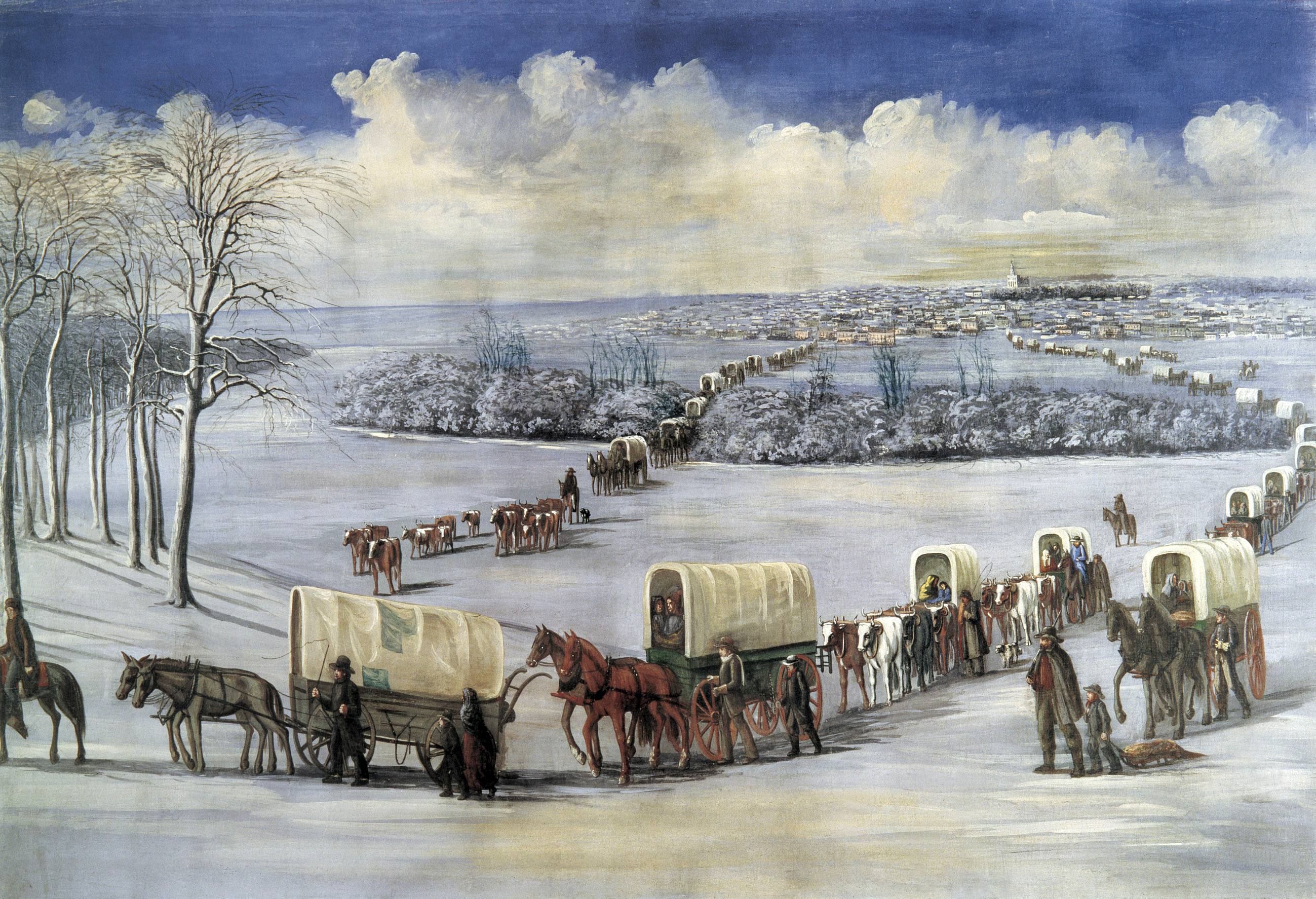
Crossing the Mississippi on the Ice by C. C. A. Christensen

Despite surrendering at Far West on November 1, Mormons (especially in outlying areas) continued to be subject to harassment by citizens and militia units. The Mormons in Caldwell County, as part of their surrender agreement, signed over all of their property to pay the expenses of the campaign against them, although this act was later held unlawful.

Though Clark had offered to allow the Mormons to remain in Missouri until the following spring, they decided to leave right away; according to one account, most had departed within ten days of Clark's speech. Although Governor Boggs belatedly ordered a militia unit under Colonel Sterling Price to northern Missouri to stop ongoing depredations against the Latter Day Saints, he refused to repeal the order. The Missouri legislature deferred discussion of an appeal by Mormons to rescind the decree.

Governor Boggs was heavily criticized in portions of the Missouri press, as well as those of neighboring states, for his action in issuing this order. General David Atchison, a legislator and militia general from western Missouri who had refused to take part in operations, demanded that the legislature formally state its opinion of Governor Boggs' order, for "he would not live in any state, where such authority was given". Although his proposal and similar ones by others went down to defeat, Governor Boggs himself saw his once-promising political career destroyed to the point that, by the next election, his own party was reluctant to be associated with him. After surviving an assassination attempt in 1842, Governor Boggs ultimately emigrated to California, where he died in relative obscurity in the Napa Valley in 1860.

== Rescission ==
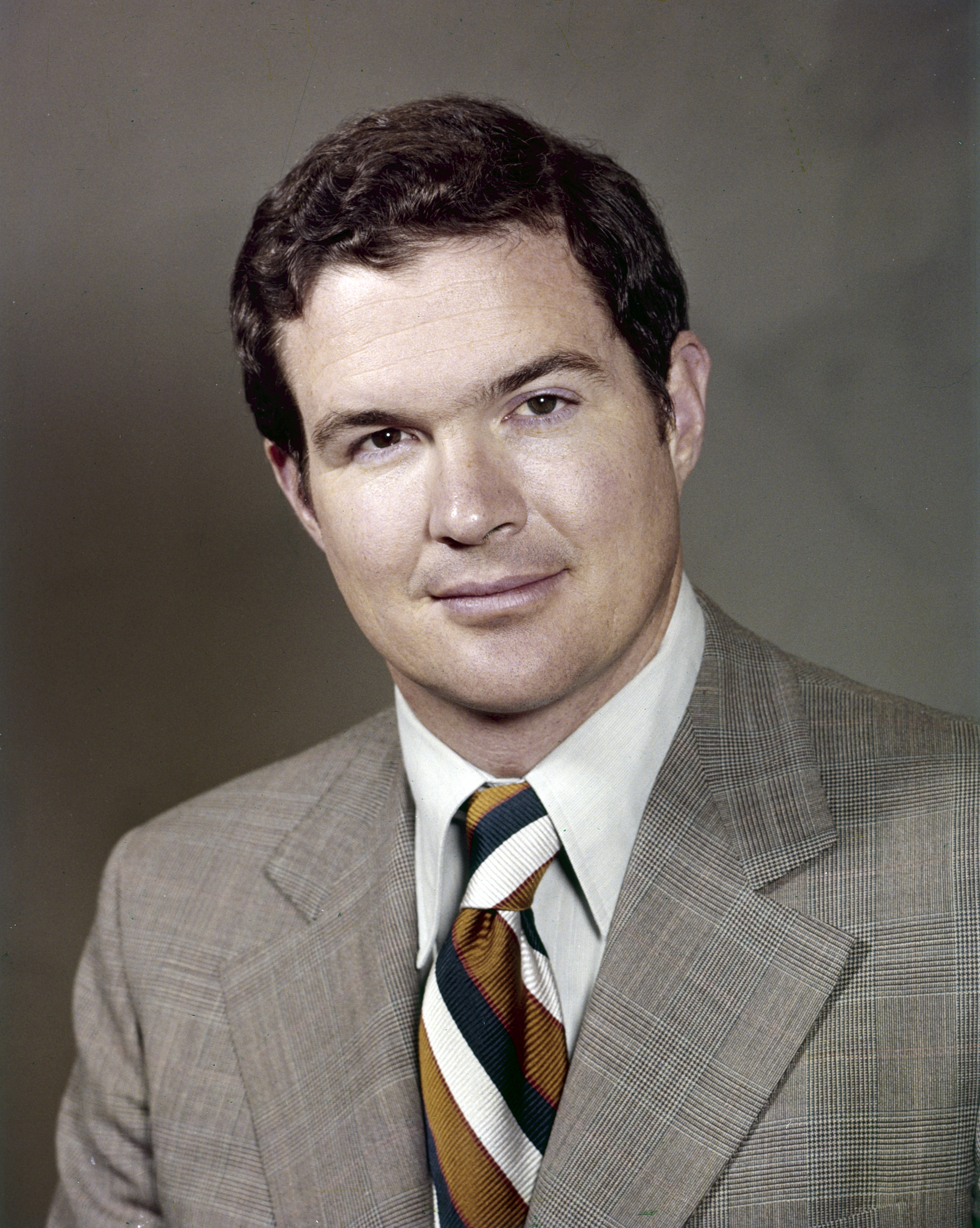
Kit Bond, the governor who rescinded the Mormon Extermination Order

In late 1975, President Lyman F. Edwards of the Far West, MO, stake of the Reorganized Church of Jesus Christ of Latter Day Saints, invited then–Missouri governor Kit Bond to participate in the June 25, 1976, annual stake conference as a goodwill gesture for the United States Bicentennial. As part of his address at that conference, 137 years after being signed and citing the unconstitutional nature of Governor Boggs' directive, Governor Bond presented the following Executive Order:

WHEREAS, on October 27, 1838, the Governor of the State of Missouri, Lilburn W. Boggs, signed an order calling for the extermination or expulsion of Mormons from the State of Missouri; and

WHEREAS, Governor Boggs' order clearly contravened the rights to life, liberty, property and religious freedom as guaranteed by the Constitution of the United States, as well as the Constitution of the State of Missouri; and

WHEREAS, in this bicentennial year as we reflect on our nation's heritage, the exercise of religious freedom is without question one of the basic tenets of our free democratic republic;

NOW, THEREFORE, I, CHRISTOPHER S. BOND, Governor of the State of Missouri, by virtue of the authority vested in me by the Constitution and the laws of the State of Missouri, do hereby order as follows:

Expressing on behalf of all Missourians our deep regret for the injustice and undue suffering which was caused by the 1838 order, I hereby rescind Executive Order Number 44, dated October 27, 1838, issued by Governor Lilburn W. Boggs.

IN WITNESS WHEREOF: I have hereunto set my hand and caused to be affixed the great seal of the State of Missouri in the city of Jefferson on this 25th day of June, 1976.

(Sealed with the Great Seal of Missouri)

(Signed) Christopher S. Bond, Governor.

== Original text ==
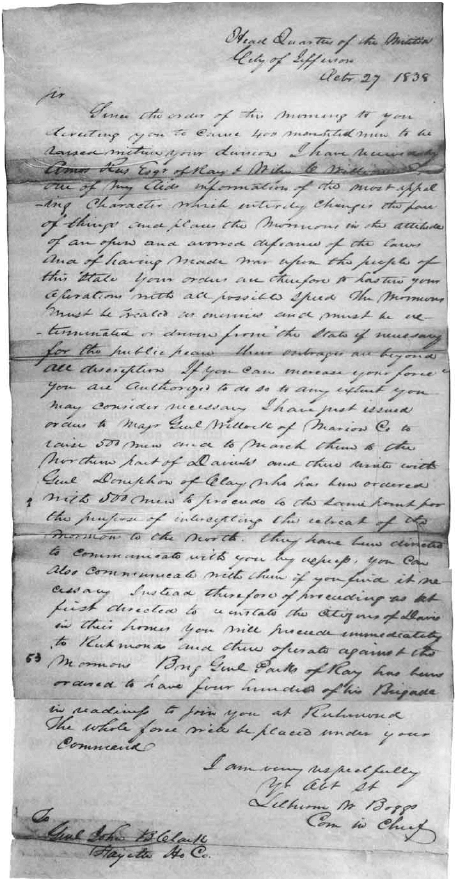
The original handwritten order

Missouri Executive Order Number 44 reads as follows:

Headquarters of the Militia,

City of Jefferson, Oct. 27, 1838.

Gen. John B. Clark:

Sir: Since the order of this morning to you, directing you to cause four hundred mounted men to be raised within your division, I have received by Amos Reese, Esq., of Ray county, and Wiley C. Williams, Esq., one of my aids [sic], information of the most appalling character, which entirely changes the face of things, and places the Mormons in the attitude of an open and avowed defiance of the laws, and of having made war upon the people of this state. Your orders are, therefore, to hasten your operation with all possible speed. The Mormons must be treated as enemies, and must be exterminated or driven from the state if necessary for the public peace—their outrages are beyond all description. If you can increase your force, you are authorized to do so to any extent you may consider necessary. I have just issued orders to Maj. Gen. Willock, of Marion county, to raise five hundred men, and to march them to the northern part of Daviess, and there unite with Gen. Doniphan, of Clay, who has been ordered with five hundred men to proceed to the same point for the purpose of intercepting the retreat of the Mormons to the north. They have been directed to communicate with you by express, you can also communicate with them if you find it necessary. Instead therefore of proceeding as at first directed to reinstate the citizens of Daviess in their homes, you will proceed immediately to Richmond and then operate against the Mormons. Brig. Gen. Parks of Ray, has been ordered to have four hundred of his brigade in readiness to join you at Richmond. The whole force will be placed under your command.

I am very respectfully,

yr obt st [your obedient servant],

L. W. Boggs,

Commander-in-Chief.

== See also ==
- Latter Day Saint martyrs
- Mormon Exodus (1846–1857)
- Pogrom
