= Expulsion of Mormons from Jackson County, Missouri =

1833 forced removal of Mormons

The Expulsion of Mormons from Jackson County, Missouri occurred in 1833 when Mormons (Latter Day Saints) were forcibly displaced from Jackson County, Missouri amidst escalating violence between Mormon residents and non-Mormon vigilantes.

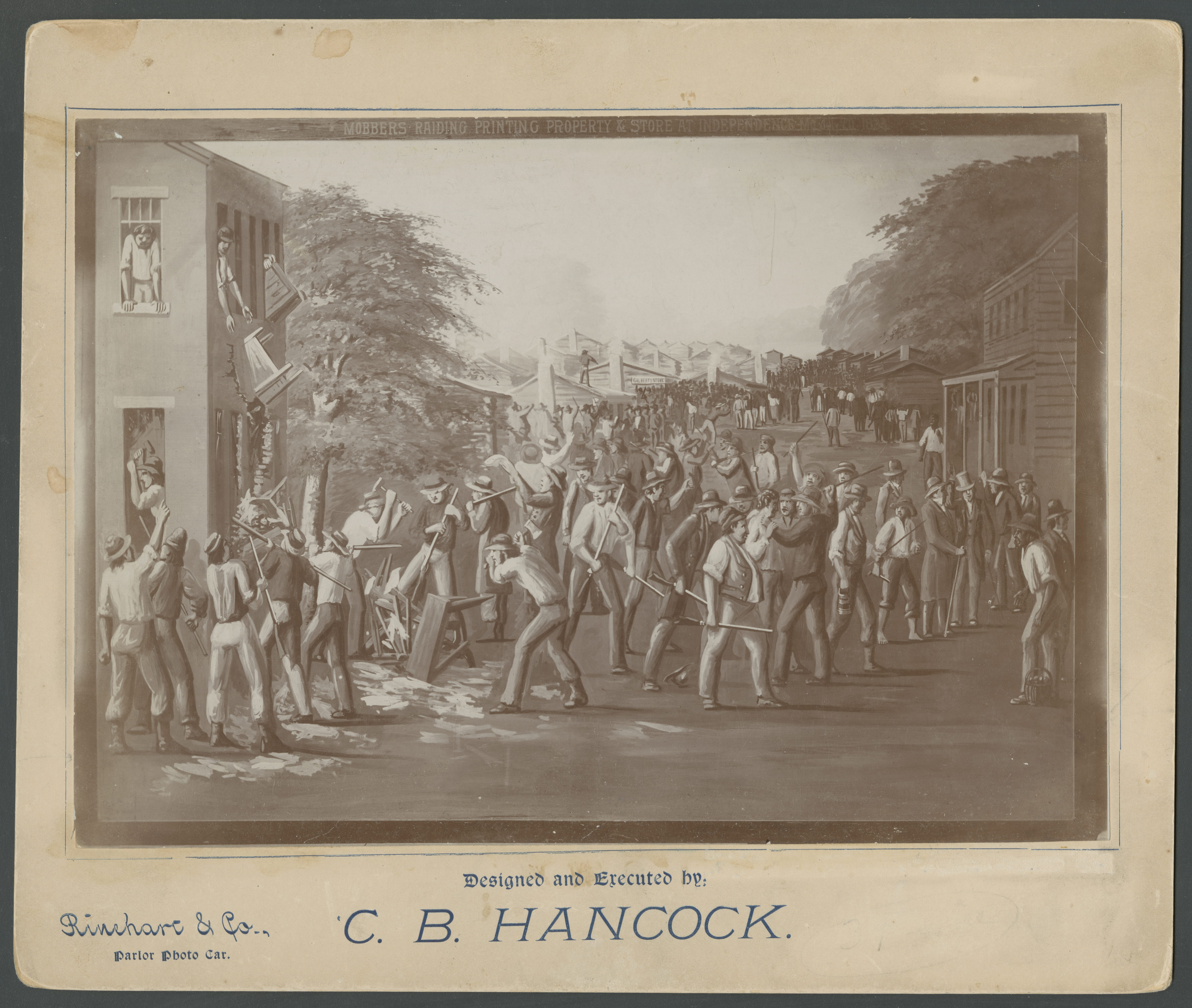
Destruction of the printing press, by C.C.A Christensen

Mormons began establishing a community in Jackson County in 1831, an outpost to the main body of the Mormons located then in Kirtland, Ohio. Jackson County was designated in July 1831 as a gathering place, where they believed they would eventually establish the city of Zion.

Tensions mounted in July 1833 when a controversial issue of the local Mormon newspaper was published. One article reminded free people of color to bring proper identification before immigrating to Missouri, as required by state law. Another article advised potential Mormon settlers to make financial preparations before immigrating, rather than expecting to obtain land “by the sword” as in the Old Testament. In response, local Missourians formed a mob and destroyed the Mormon printing press.

In October 1833, Mormon leaders received an ultimatum demanding their departure from the county. The expelled Mormons sought refuge in neighboring counties, especially Clay County. Despite legal efforts and sympathy from the Missouri press and state government, the Mormons were unable to regain a foothold in Jackson County. The expulsion had a profound impact on the Latter Day Saint community, shaping their history, migration patterns, and religious development in subsequent years.

== Background ==
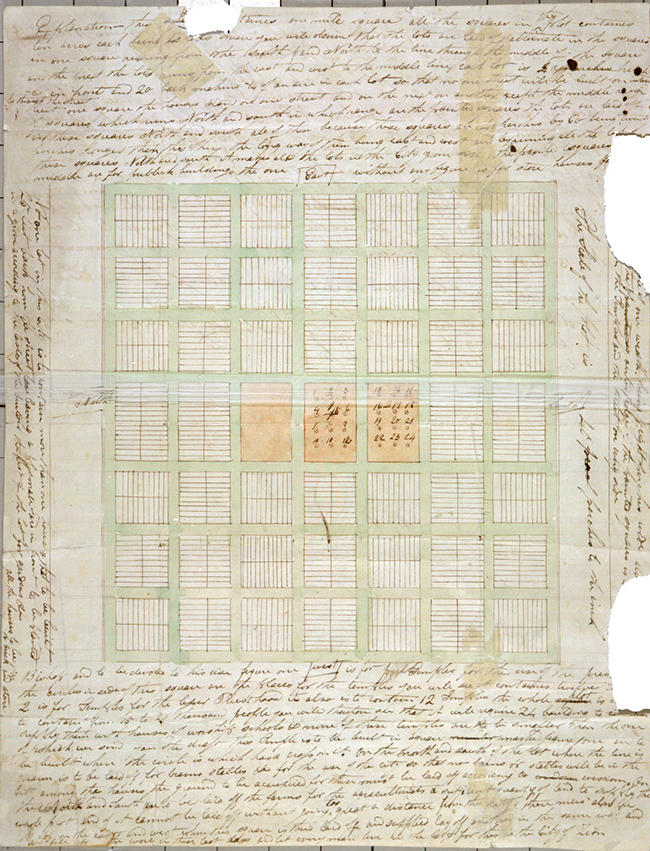
This one page Plat written in June 1833 by Joseph Smith defines a comprehensive multiple city plan.

Shortly after the founding of the Church of Christ (Latter Day Saint), early Mormon missionaries were instructed in a revelation to Joseph Smith in September 1830 to "go among the Lamanites and preach my gospel unto them." The "Lamanites" were understood to be Native Americans living on the border of Missouri, where they were being forcibly relocated by the United States government. The location of Zion was not specified, but originally given in revelation to be "among the Lamanites," across the border of Missouri in Indian territory. When missionaries arrived however in January 1831, the United States government did not permit any missionary work or Latter Day Saint settlements.

On July 20, 1831 Smith received a new revelation that the location of Zion would be located across the river on the "borders of the Lamanites" in Jackson County, specifically in the county seat of Independence. Earlier revelations were modified to reflect the new location in Missouri rather than Indian territory. The Mormons settled primarily in the western part of Kaw Township and opened a school in what is now Troost Park. On August 3, 1831, Smith, Oliver Cowdery, Sidney Rigdon, Peter Whitmer Jr., Frederick G. Williams, W. W. Phelps, Martin Harris, and Joseph Coe laid a stone as the northeast cornerstone of the anticipated temple in Independence. On December 19, 1831, Edward Partidge, who had been selected as Bishop to the Independence congregation, purchased 63 acres (250,000 m^{2}), including the Temple Lot.

In June 1832, W.W. Phelps, Mormon convert and a former editor from New York, moved to Independence, and set up operation of a printing press, establishing The Evening and the Morning Star, a monthly Mormon newspaper. Independence resident Josiah Gregg recalled: "in proportion as [the Mormons] grew strong in numbers, they also became more exacting and bold in their pretensions. In a little paper printed at Independence under their immediate auspices, everything was said that could provoke hostility between 'saints' and their 'worldly' neighbors, until at last they became so emboldened by impunity, as openly to boast of their determination to be the sole proprietors of the 'Land of Zion.'"

In December 1832, contemporary sources estimated that 100 Mormons populated Jackson County. By 1833, about 1200 Mormons had settled in the county, making up between one-third and one-half of the population. As the number of Mormons in the area grew, tensions emerged between the Mormons and their non-Mormon neighbors. This was partly due to the religious and cultural differences between the two groups, economic competition, political differences, and fears of cultural displacement.

A comprehensive plat was devised by Smith in 1833, describing the planned city as an organized grid system of blocks and streets, with blocks house lots that alternated in direction by columns of blocks between north-south streets. The plan called for 24 Mormon temples at the city's center.

== July edition of The Star and escalating violence ==
The July 1833 edition of the Evening and the Morning Star, a Mormon local newspaper, featured multiple stories that contributed to the growing tensions.

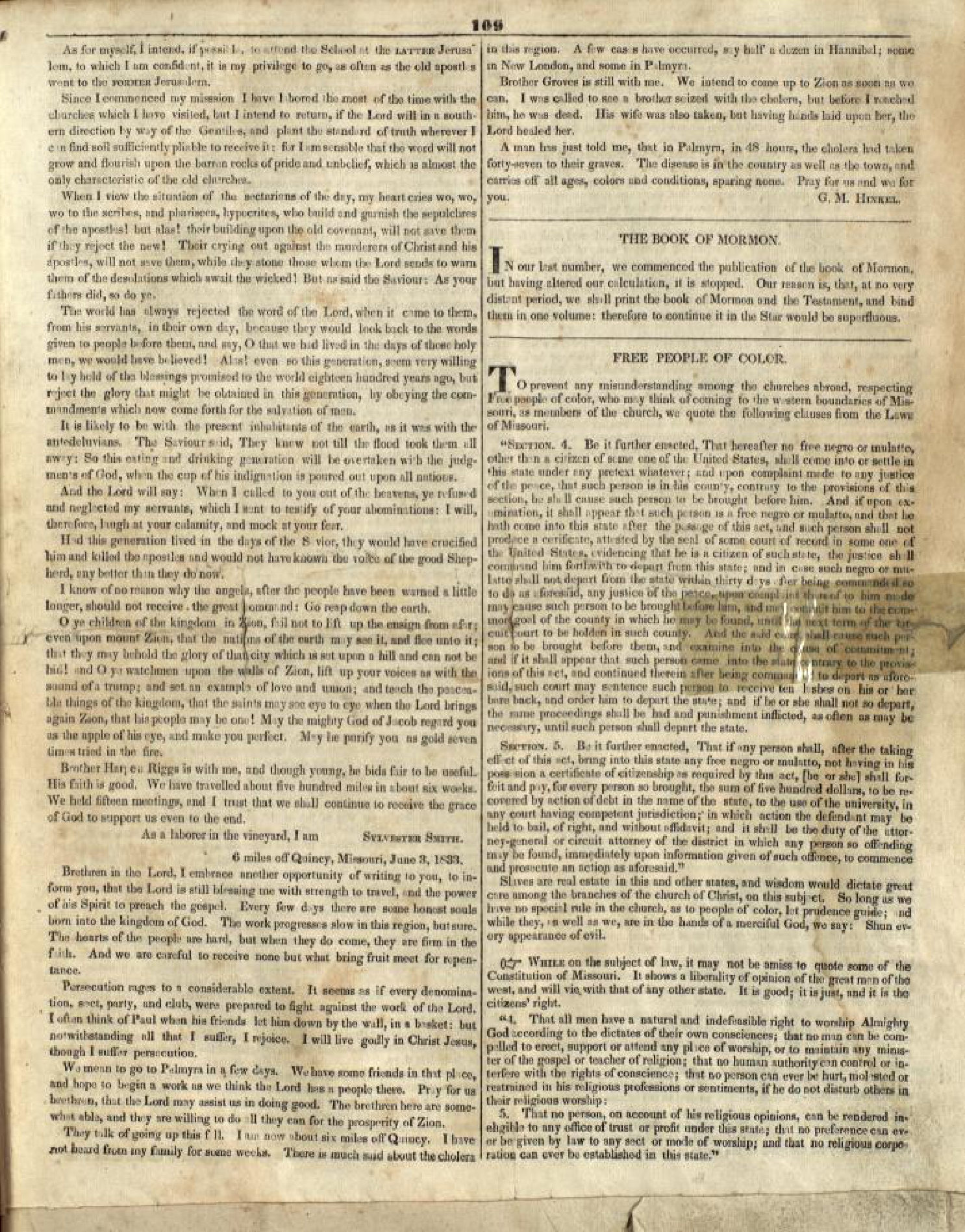
The controversial issue of The Evening and the Morning Star published in July 1833.

The most controversial piece, titled "Free People of Color," reminded readers to comply with Missouri state law, which required free people of color to bring proof of citizenship when settling in the state. This inflamed tensions with the Missourians, who interpreted it as evidence of the Mormons actively facilitating and encouraging the settlement of free blacks, which was seen as extremely undesirable to settlers of the newly-created slave state. The Star would later publish an extra denying these allegations, arguing their intent was to deter such migration.

A second piece cautioned Mormons to adequately prepare before attempting to migrate to Jackson County, reminding them that while "the children of Israel" were "compelled to obtain [the Holy Land] by the sword, with the sacrifice of many lives", land in Jackson had to be lawfully purchased: "to suppose that we can come up here and take possession of this land by the shedding of blood, would be setting at nought the law of the glorious gospel, and also the word of our great Redeemer: And to suppose that we can take possession of this country, without making regular purchases of the same according to the laws of our nation, would be reproaching this great Republic ... under whose auspices we all have protection." While the piece attempted to stem the influx of unprepared Mormon settlers and emphasized the need to respect property rights, the mere mention of land being obtained "by the sword" inflamed anxieties among Missourians.

=== Destruction of The Star ===
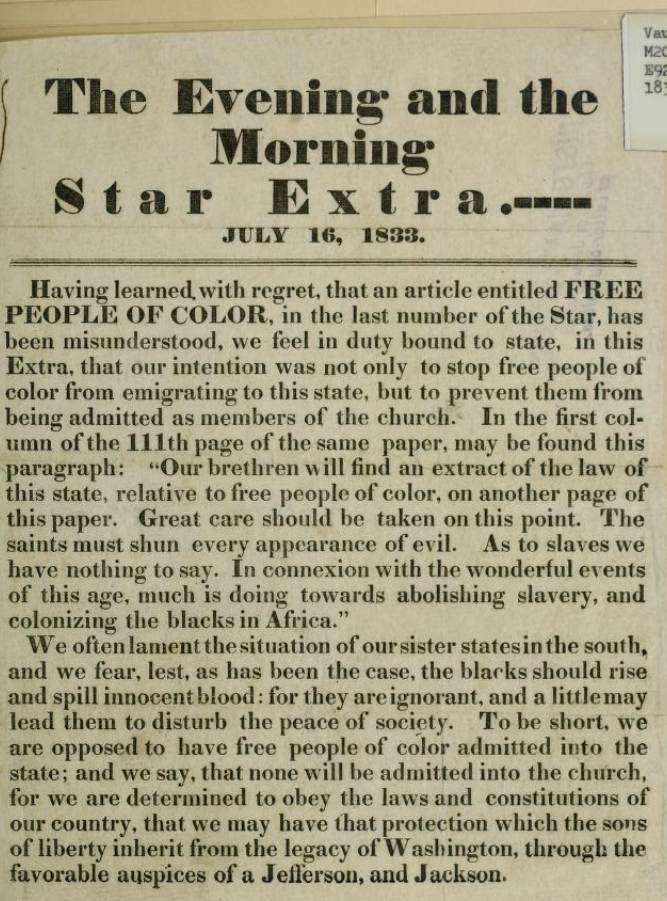
"Extra" of the Evening and Morning Star published July 16, 1833 in an effort to defuse the tense situation.

The situation escalated when citizens of Jackson County convened a town meeting to address their concerns on "the Mormon issue". The meeting's address, penned on July 20, accused the Mormons, who were described as "little above the condition of our blacks either in regard to property or education", of having a "corrupting influence on our slaves", seeking to win lands by violent means, and of plotting to take over the county: "we are daily told, and not by the ignorant alone, but by all classes of them, that we...of this county are to be cut off, and our lands appropriated by them for inheritances." The address argued that "it requires no gift of prophecy to tell that the day is not far distant when the civil government of the country will be in their hands". It demanded that no further Mormons settle in the county, that the existing Mormons leave, and that their newspaper cease publication immediately. The address concluded warning that those who failed to comply would face dire consequences.

After the demands were presented to prominent Mormons, the meeting reconvened and were told that the local Mormon leaders requested an "unreasonable" amount of time to respond. As a result, a mob attacked the newspaper's printing office, destroyed the press, and tarred and feathered two Mormon leaders.

=== Forced "agreement" ===
On July 23, a mob again gathered at the courthouse square, and rounded up six of the church's high priests. The vigilantes dispersed after extracting an agreement from them that half of the Mormons would leave the county by January 1, 1834, and the rest by April 1. In exchange for the Mormons leaving their homes, the local citizens council would "use all their influence to prevent any violence" so long as the Mormons complied with the "agreement".

== Expulsion ==
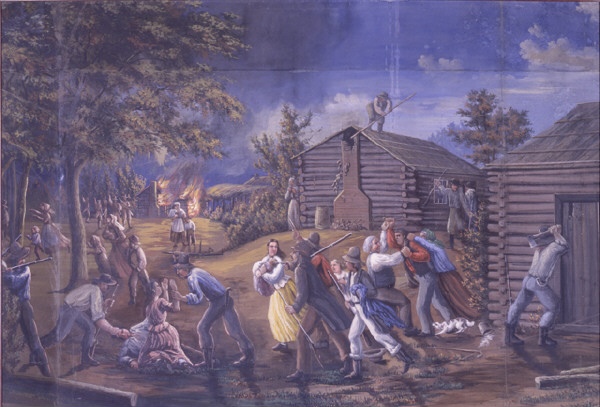
"Saints Driven From Jackson County Missouri" by C.C.A. Christensen

In October 1833, W. W. Phelps and Orson Hyde traveled to Jefferson City, the state capital, to present a petition to Governor Daniel Dunklin requesting militia protection and redress for damaged property. The government of Missouri condemned the actions of the vigilantes, and advised the Mormon representatives to prosecute their offenders through local courts. Following the governor's advice, the Mormon leaders filed lawsuits against the perpetrators of the printing shop's destruction.

On October 31, likely catalyzed by the Mormons' legal actions, a mob raided a Mormon settlement eight miles west of Independence, damaging several houses and whipping the men inside. The next day, the Mormon storehouse in Independence was sacked, having its goods scattered on the street.

On November 4, some 50 Missourians gathered near the Big Blue River and captured the Mormon ferry. A gunfire exchange ensued which resulted in the death of one Mormon and two non-Mormons. After the local militia intervened, the Mormons surrendered their arms and agreed to leave the county within ten days.

== Aftermath ==
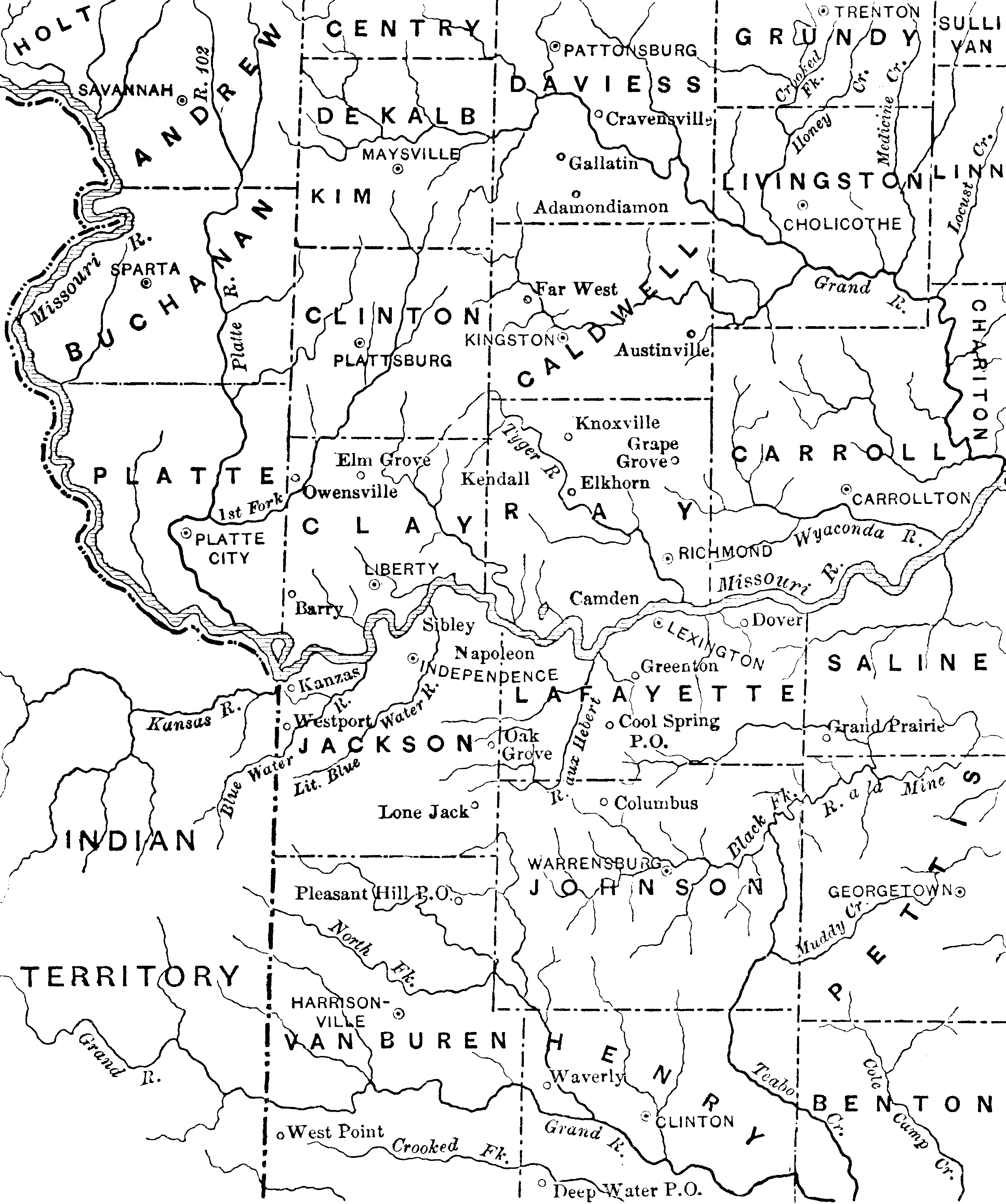
Settlements in western Missouri in 1838

The non-Mormons in Jackson County refused to allow the Mormons to return to their lands, and reimbursement of confiscated and damaged property was refused. In 1834, Mormons attempted to effect a return to Jackson County with a quasi-military expedition known as Zion's Camp. This expedition originated from the church's headquarters in Kirtland, Ohio, with the aim of reaching Jackson County. However, it disbanded after the governor failed to provide the expected support.

The expulsion garnered significant attention and widespread disapproval from both local and national press.

It is possible to forsee what is to be the result of this singular and outrageous violation of the laws. We fear that the party opposed to the Mormons will think themselves placed so far beyond the pale of the law as to continue utterly regardless of it. . . The Mormons are as much protected in their religion, their property, and persons, as any other denomination or class of men. (Missouri Republican, November 1833)

New converts to Mormonism continued to relocate to Missouri and settle in Clay County. Tensions rose in Clay County as the Mormon population grew. In an effort to keep the peace, Alexander William Doniphan of Clay County pushed a law through the Missouri legislature that created Caldwell County, Missouri, specifically for Mormon settlement in 1836.

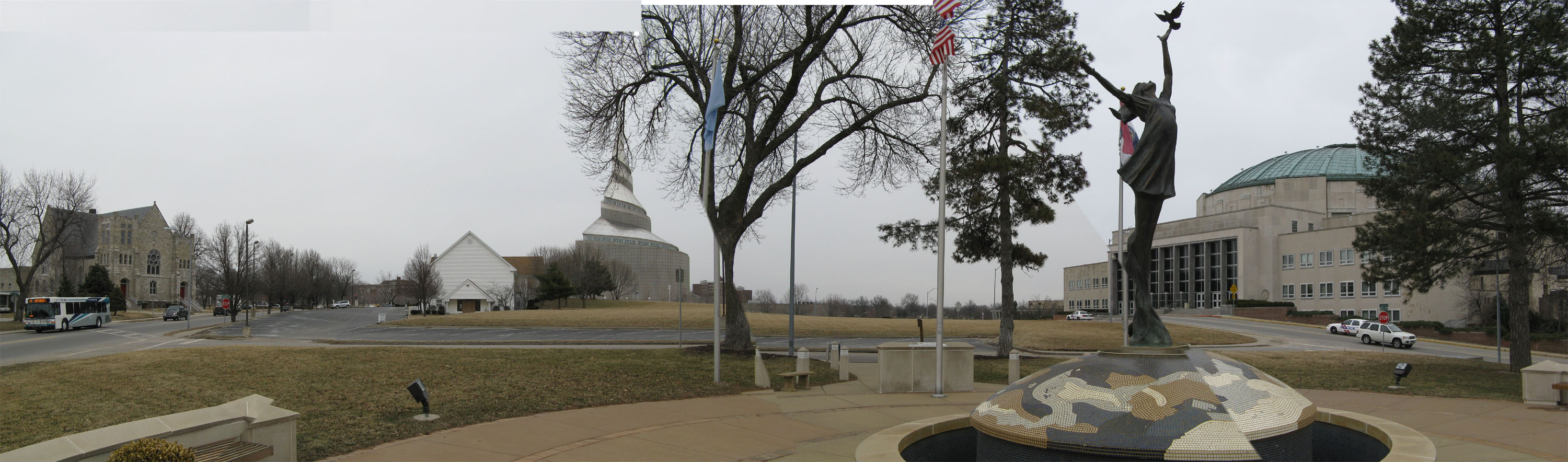
A panoramic view of Temple Lot from the U.N. Plaza to the west. Significant buildings (left to right): Stone Church (a historic congregational building of the Community of Christ), Church of Christ Temple Lot, Community of Christ Temple, Mormon Independence Visitor Center (slightly visible to the left down the hill from the auditorium), Community of Christ Auditorium.
