= George M. Hinkle =

American Mormon leader

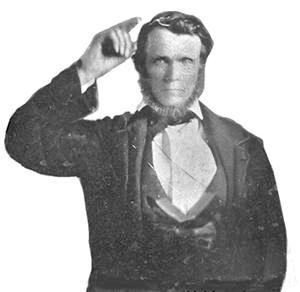

Founder of Church of Jesus Christ, the Bride, the Lamb's Wife
- June 24, 1840 – November 9, 1861

Personal details
- Born: George March Hinkle; November 13, 1801; Kentucky, United States
- Died: November 9, 1861 (aged 59); New Buda, Iowa, United States
- Resting place: Hamilton Cemetery; 40.596°N 93.748°W
- Occupation: Physician and minister.
- Spouse(s): Sally Ann Adams (1811-1845); Mary Loman Hartman1846-1861

George March Hinkle (November 13, 1801 – November 9, 1861) was an early leader in the Latter Day Saint movement.

== Personal life ==
Hinkle was born in Jefferson County, Kentucky, to Michael Hinkle and Nancy Higgins. George married Sarah Ann Stark (or Adams), who died in 1844 or 1845. He subsequently married the widow Mary Loman Hartman, and she outlived him. Hinkle lived in Iowa where he was commissioned a colonel in the militia. He died in 1861 and is buried in Hamilton Cemetery in Pleasanton, Iowa.

== Church of Christ ==
George joined the Church of Christ in 1832. He sat on the church's high council in Far West, Missouri, and led the settlement of De Witt, Missouri. He was commissioned a colonel in the Missouri militia and was the commander of the militia in predominantly Mormon Caldwell County. During the 1838 Mormon War at the siege of Far West, Hinkle negotiated a peace with Colonel Lucas of the Missouri militia, which included the surrender of church leaders to the custody of Colonel Lucas. This "custody" eventually resulted in imprisonment in Liberty Jail. In making the agreement, Hinkle told Joseph Smith to walk into the militia's camp to discuss the matter. John P. Greene, "an authorized representative of the Mormons," portrayed Hinkle's actions as "deceit and stratagem" and "treachery." Smith would later win a lawsuit against Hinkle for the cost of personal property taken from Smith's home by Hinkle after Smith was taken into custody. Hinkle was excommunicated on March 17, 1839, along with John Corrill and W. W. Phelps, who had also met with Colonel Lucas.

== Church of Jesus Christ, the Bride, the Lamb's Wife ==
Still a believer after his excommunication, in 1840 Hinkle founded a Latter Day Saint denomination known as the Church of Jesus Christ, the Bride, the Lamb's Wife. Its membership drew primarily from members who had dissented from the church when it was headquartered in Far West in 1838.

The church was organized by Hinkle on June 24, 1840; it held its first conference in the town of Moscow, Iowa Territory, on November 20, 1842.

In September 1843, John C. Bennett attended a conference of Hinkle's church. After this conference, Bennett began writing about the Mormon "Doctrine of Marrying for Eternity," which Hinkle appears to have conveyed to Bennett.

== Sources ==
- Richard P. Howard, The Church through the Years, Independence, Missouri: Herald House, 1992, p. 305.
- Lavina Fielding Anderson, Lucy's Book, Salt Lake City, Utah: Signature Books, 2001, p. 826.
- John P. Greene, Facts Relative to the Expulsion of the Mormons or Latter-day Saints from the State of Missouri under the 'Exterminating Order, Cincinnati, Ohio: R. P. Brooks, 1839, p. 25.
- John C. Bennett, letter to the editor, Hawk-Eye and Iowa Patriot, October 28, 1843.
- "Henckel/Hinkle Family Photo Album: George March Hinkle". Ancestry.com.
- Biography of George Hinkle, Joseph Smith Papers (accessed January 9, 2012)
- Steven L. Shields, Divergent Paths of the Restoration: A History of the Latter Day Saint Movement, Restoration Research, Los Angeles: 1990, p. 25.
