= Salt Sermon =

1838 speech by Mormon leader Sidney Rigdon

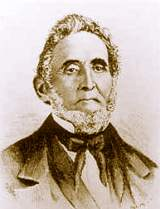
Sidney Rigdon, deliverer of the "salt sermon"

The salt sermon was an oration delivered on 17 June 1838 by Sidney Rigdon, then First Counselor in the First Presidency of the Church of Jesus Christ of Latter Day Saints, and frequent spokesman for Joseph Smith, the founder of the Latter Day Saint movement, against church dissenters, including Book of Mormon witnesses Oliver Cowdery, David Whitmer, and John Whitmer, and other leaders including W. W. Phelps. The Salt Sermon is often confused with Rigdon's July 4th oration.

== Background ==
The years before 1838 were difficult for the members and leaders of Church of Jesus Christ of Latter Day Saints. In 1837, Smith and Rigdon founded an "anti-bank" called the Kirtland Safety Society. When it failed much of the blame was laid upon Smith. Half of the Quorum of Twelve Apostles accused Smith of improprieties in the banking scandal. LDS Church Apostle Heber C. Kimball would later say that the bank's failure was so shattering that afterwards "there were not twenty persons on earth that would declare that Joseph Smith was a prophet of God." Smith's former secretary, Warren Parish, along with Martin Harris and others, vied for control of the church in Kirtland, taking possession of the Kirtland Temple, "excommunicating" Smith and Rigdon, and forcing Smith and Rigdon to relocate and establish a community at Far West, Missouri. They were followed there by hundreds of loyalists in a trek known as the "Kirtland Camp."

However, after fleeing from Kirtland, Smith faced continuing external persecutions, along with serious internal dissensions. Smith and Rigdon became determined to extinguish this perceived apostasy in the church as they believed that the very entire future of the Latter Day Saint movement was at stake. Due to Rigdon's ability to sway audiences, he became Smith's spokesman in an attempt to promote church orthodoxy, and as a result Rigdon also became symbol of the militancy of the church in Far West.

== Sermon ==
On 17 June 1838, in Far West, Rigdon delivered a harsh public condemnation of a large number of the members and leaders of the church for their perceived disloyalty towards Smith and Rigdon. While no summary or text of Rigdon's sermon remains, eyewitnesses indicated that Rigdon took the subject of his text from the fifth chapter of the Gospel of Matthew.

If the salt have lost its savor, wherewith shall it be salted? It is thenceforth good for nothing, but to be cast out, and to be trodden under foot of men.

— Matthew 5:13

According to Rigdon, the dissenters were like the "salt" spoken of by Jesus (part of the metaphors of salt and light in the Sermon on the Mount) and must be "trodden under foot".

Rigdon was then followed by Smith with a short speech, in which he seemingly sanctioned what Rigdon had said.

== Response ==
The Salt Sermon caused a great deal of demand to purge the church of any disloyal members. This included the formation of the seemingly unauthorized Danites, a secret militant society for the enforcement of church orthodoxy. Two days after Rigdon sermon, eighty Latter Day Saints signed a statement (the so-called Danite Manifesto) warning the dissenters to "depart, or a more fatal calamity shall befall you." According to John Corrill, an early church member and leader,

...the first presidency did not seem to have much to do with [the Danites] at first", [but] some of the Danites clearly saw the salt sermon as a sign of approval.

Corrill stated that "although [Rigdon] did not give names in his sermon, yet it was plainly understood that he meant the dissenters or those who had denied the faith." The dissenters and their families interpreted these words as threats, and they quickly left Caldwell County, Missouri. Their stories helped stir up anti-Mormon feeling in northwestern Missouri and contributed to the outbreak of the 1838 Mormon War.
