= Rigdon's July 4th oration =

1838 speech by Mormon leader Sidney Rigdon

Rigdon's July 4th oration was a speech delivered by Mormon leader Sidney Rigdon during a 4th of July celebration in Far West, Missouri in 1838. Rigdon was first counselor to, and often spokesman for, Joseph Smith Jr.

The first half of the oration described the importance of the founding of the United States from a traditional and Church perspective. The second half of the oration was meant as a Mormon "declaration of independence" against "mobocrats" and Anti-Mormon persecution. In his speech, Rigdon declared:

We take God and all the holy angels to witness this day, that we warn all men in the name of Jesus Christ, to come on us no more forever. For from this hour, we will bear it no more, our rights shall no more be trampled on with impunity. The man or the set of men, who attempts it, does it at the expense of their lives. And that mob that comes on us to disturb us; it shall be between us and them a war of extermination; for we will follow them till the last drop of their blood is spilled, or else they will have to exterminate us: for we will carry the seat of war to their own houses, and their own families, and one party or the other shall be utterly destroyed.—Remember it then all MEN.
We will never be the aggressors, we will infringe on the rights of no people; but shall stand for our own until death. We claim our own rights, and are willing that all others shall enjoy theirs.
No man shall be at liberty to come into our streets, to threaten us with mobs, for if he does, he shall atone for it before he leaves the place, neither shall he be at liberty, to vilify and slander any of us, for suffer it we will not in this place.

The speech alarmed local non-Mormons attending the celebration. Later, the church presidency published the July 4th Oration, causing considerable agitation and further stoking anti-Mormon sentiment throughout northwestern Missouri. Many contemporaries and later historians cite the July 4th Oration as a contributing factor to the 1838 Mormon War.

The July 4th Oration is often confused with the Salt Sermon.
