= C. C. A. Christensen =

Danish-American artist (1831–1912)

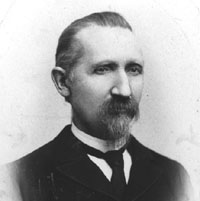
- Born: Carl Christian Anton Christensen; November 28, 1831; Copenhagen, Denmark
- Died: July 3, 1912 (aged 80); Ephraim, Utah, US
- Education: Royal Danish Academy of Fine Arts
- Known for: Painting

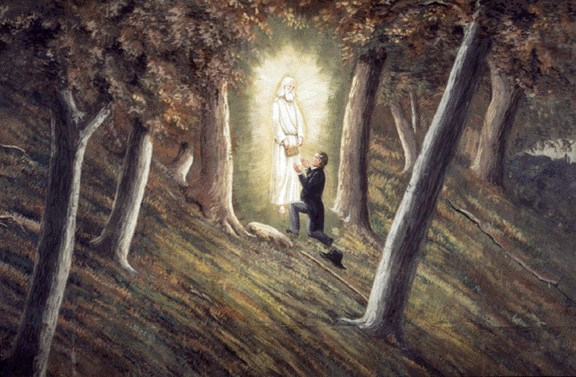
The Hill Cumorah by Christensen depicting Joseph Smith receiving the golden plates from the Angel Moroni

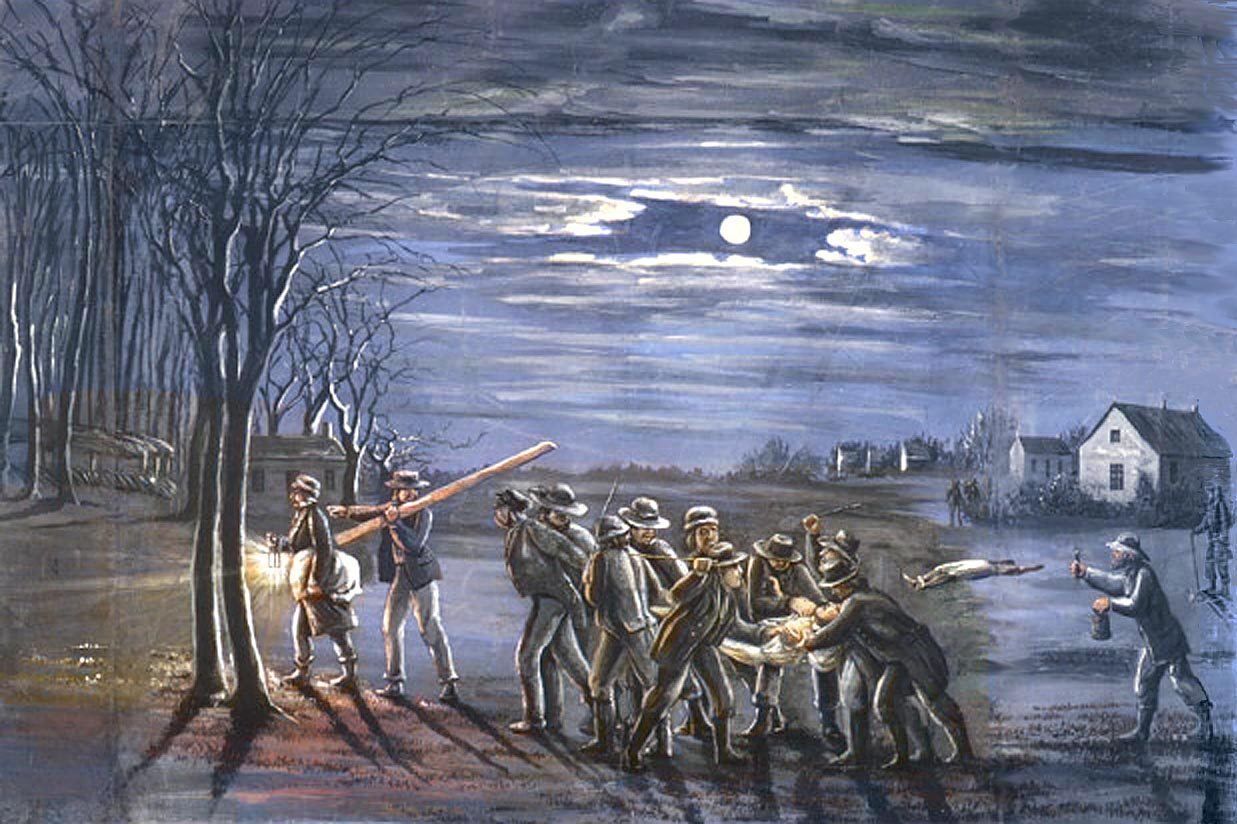
Tarring and feathering of Joseph Smith by Christensen

Carl Christian Anton Christensen (November 28, 1831 – July 3, 1912) was a Danish-American painter who painted the history of the Church of Jesus Christ of Latter-day Saints (LDS Church). It was said of Christensen that he "did more than any other person to capture the images of the history of Mormon migration to Utah and the life lived there".

== Early life ==
Christensen was born on November 18, 1831, in Copenhagen, and studied at the Royal Danish Academy of Fine Arts in Copenhagen. On September 26, 1850, he was baptized into the LDS Church in Copenhagen by George P. Dykes. Christensen subsequently served as a missionary in his native Denmark.

Christensen also served as a missionary in Norway beginning in fall 1853. While in Norway, Christensen was the first Mormon missionary to preach in Christiania (now Oslo). While in Christiana, Christensen taught Danquart Anthon Weggeland, who became another prominent early Utah artist. During his time as a missionary in Norway, Christensen was twice put in prison due to government officials not approving of the preaching of Mormonism.

In 1857, at the end of his service in Norway, Christensen set off for Utah Territory, stopping en route in England. He had met Elsie Scheel Haarby while serving in Norway, and he and Elsie married in Liverpool, England. They had planned to wait until reaching Utah to get married but leaders felt the trip would be easier if engaged couples got married before starting the journey. and they sailed for America on the Westmoreland. After reaching New York City, they traveled by railroad to Iowa City, Iowa, the end of the line, and from there set out for Utah Territory, traveling with the Christian Christiansen handcart company.

== Painting ==
In 1862, Christensen did stage painting for a theatre in Springville, Utah. Early in his time in Utah, he could find so little demand for his artistic skills that he worked as a housepainter.

The first major artwork that Christensen undertook while in Utah was a commission from Dimick B. Huntington in 1871 to create a 22-foot-long panorama with scenes from the Bible and Book of Mormon, in collaboration with Dan Weggeland. Huntington used the panorama to convert Utes and Shoshones to the Church of Jesus Christ of Latter-day Saints.

Commissioned by Charles B. Hancock of Payson, Utah, Christensen painted a panorama about the Walker War and an Indian reserve in Benjamin, Utah.

Christensen is best known for his Mormon Panorama, a series of 23 large paintings that depict the history of the church. Christensen also painted scenes from the Book of Mormon, such as Nephi and Zoram Return with the Record. Christensen's Book of Mormon paintings were originally issued by the Sunday School for use in classrooms; they were later issued in lithography form.

Christensen began touring with the 175 feet (53 m)-long Mormon panorama in 1878. Christensen would transport it about Utah, Idaho and Wyoming, giving presentations along with the panorama. He did this during the winter when he was not busy working on his farm. After Christensen's death the panorama was stored away. Many years later it was discovered again and brought back to light, partly by the efforts of Boyd K. Packer. It would gain its fullest recognition almost a century later when it would be shown at the Whitney Museum of American Art in New York City.

Christensen also painted some of the murals in the Manti and St. George Temples.

Another theme of some of Christensen's paintings was Manti and its surroundings.

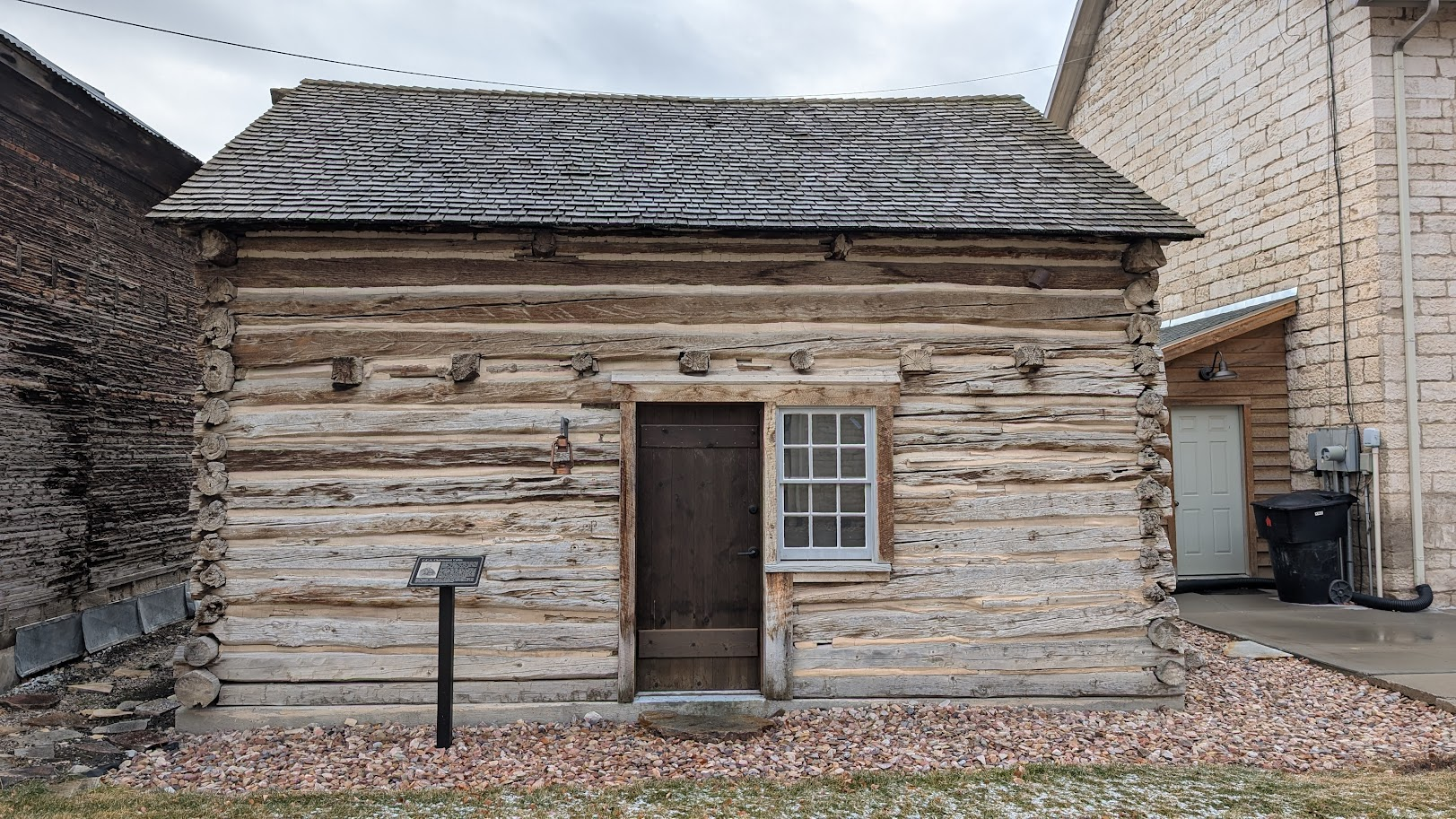
Cabin of Christensen, built in 1875 Manasseh Utah, moved to Ephraim in 1998.

== Other Utah activities ==
During his first days in Utah, Christensen found little time to paint. He did various odd jobs such as laying brick and burning charcoal as well as farming.

Christensen wrote many LDS hymns in Danish. Some of his translated texts are still in use. Christensen also wrote poetry and contributed to Bikuben. Later he would serve as an editor of that publication. He was also a coauthor of the History of the Scandinavian Mission.

Christensen was an instructor in drawing and Danish at the Sanpete Stake Academy (now Snow College).

Christensen served a second mission from 1865 to 1868. He went on a third mission to Denmark from 1887 to 1889, during which he worked as the editor of the Scandinaviens Stjerne.

Christensen was the Sanpete Stake patriarch in 1901. He also worked in the LDS Church Historian's Office where he compiled materials related to the history of the church in Scandinavia.

== Rediscovery ==
In a 1976 speech given at Brigham Young University, LDS Church apostle Boyd K. Packer recounted the rediscovery of Christensen's work:

Some years ago I was chairman of a committee of seminary men responsible to produce a filmstrip on Church history. One of the group, Trevor Christensen, remembered that down in Sanpete County was a large canvas roll of paintings. They had been painted by one of his progenitors, C. C. A. Christensen, who traveled through the settlements giving a lecture on Church history as each painting was unrolled and displayed by lamplight. The roll of paintings had been stored away for generations. We sent a truck for them, and I shall not forget the day we unrolled it.

Christensen's 1900 painting Handcart Pioneers (not part of Mormon Panorama) "has become the most widely published painting of the Mormon pioneer experience by an actual pioneer."

== See also ==
- List of Danish painters
- Mormon art
- Brent Christensen, great-great-grandson of Christensen
