= Gathering (LDS Church) =

Gathering has been an important part of life in the Church of Jesus Christ of Latter-day Saints (LDS Church), from gathering as missionaries to gathering for worship services. In the early days of the church, members were asked to gather together many times in specific locations from all over the world, including traveling across the United States to the Utah Territory. In the modern era, members are able to gather in the stakes of Zion located in their local areas and to build the Kingdom of God wherever they are, often via technology.

== Doctrine ==
Nevertheless the children of God were commanded that they should gather themselves together oft, and join in fasting and mighty prayer in behalf of the welfare of the souls of those who knew not God.

Alma 6:6, Book of Mormon

LDS Church members are commanded to meet together often, to uplift each other and strengthen their faith in God.

== Historic examples ==
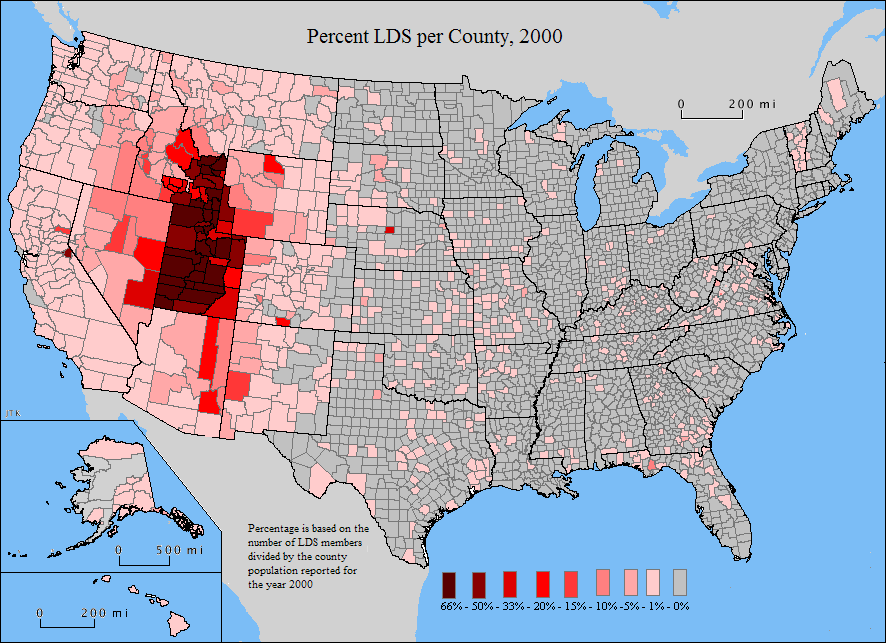
LDS percentage of US population by county in 2000

Historically, Latter-day Saints have gathered in many locations, including:

- Kirtland, Ohio
- Independence, Missouri
- Nauvoo, Illinois
- Salt Lake City and the surrounding Salt Lake Valley
- Various sites within the Mormon Corridor
- Laie, Hawaii

== Modern practices ==
In the modern era, members are asked to gather in the stakes of Zion in their local areas.

The members gather with their local ward or branch (smaller congregation) for weekly worship services in meetinghouses. Twice a year there is a stake conference for each stake, where the members of the several wards that make up each stake meet as a group. These were previously held in stake tabernacles, but now normally will occur in stake centers. District and area conference also happen periodically. Latter-day Saints gather twice each year for general conference, currently held in the Conference Center, but available via broadcast through a variety of outlets.

In high schools, primarily through the western United States, Latter-day Saint students can gather for released-time (or early-morning) seminary to learn more about the teachings found in the Standard Works. In colleges and other areas throughout the world, students gather together to take institute classes which teach these same topics at a collegiate level.

== Gathering of Israel ==
In the Old Testament, Israel had the blessings of being God's covenant people, but they were scattered because of rebellion. God promised that the Children of Israel would be gathered. Missionaries are sent by the church worldwide to gather the children of God. Peter and Paul prophesied that all things were to be restored during this last dispensation, which includes gathering the scattered.

Latter-day Saints are taught that one of the main purposes for gathering is to make all of the saving ordinances available, especially those that are limited to a temple.

=== Patriarchal Blessings ===
Members of the church are able to receive a patriarchal blessing in which they are declared a member of a particular tribe of Israel, either by lineage or adoption. They receive the responsibilities and blessings of that tribe as well as guidance for their own lives. This is similar to the blessings given by Jacob to his sons in Genesis 49. The purpose is to help the individual know their role in the gathering of Israel.

==== House of Joseph ====
The LDS Church teaches that many of its members today are of the tribe of Ephraim, which it views as fulfilling the promise that Ephraim would have the birthright in the last days, as well as the responsibility to gather Israel. It also teaches that the tribe of Manasseh will assist the tribe of Ephraim in gathering of Israel. Together, the tribes of Ephraim and Manasseh will be gathered in the Americas.

== See also ==
- Articles of Faith (Latter Day Saints) (number 10)
- Gathering of Israel
- House of Joseph (LDS Church)
- Mormon pioneers
- Mormon Trail
- Mormonism and Judaism
- State of Deseret
- Ten Lost Tribes
- Zion (Latter Day Saints)
