= The Wasp (newspaper) =

1840s newspaper in Nauvoo, Illinois

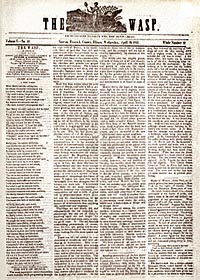
Example of the front page of The Wasp, originally published in 1842 in Nauvoo

The Wasp (often referred to as Nauvoo Wasp) was a weekly Latter Day Saint newspaper edited and published by William Smith in Nauvoo, Illinois, from April 1842 to April 1843. While it was not an official publication of the Church of Jesus Christ of Latter Day Saints, The Wasp was consistently pro-Mormon and its primary target audience was the Latter Day Saint residents of Nauvoo. The Wasp ceased publication when it was replaced by John Taylor's similarly themed Nauvoo Neighbor.

The Wasp has been described as the "secular counterpart" of the Latter Day Saint Church's Times and Seasons. The newspaper dedicated much of its space to answering the criticism by Thomas C. Sharp's and the anti-Mormon Warsaw Signal directed at the church and Joseph Smith, founder of the Latter Day Saint movement.

== See also ==
- The Evening and the Morning Star
- Messenger and Advocate
- Elders' Journal
- Millennial Star
- List of Latter Day Saint periodicals
