= Nauvoo Neighbor =

1840s newspaper in Nauvoo, Illinois

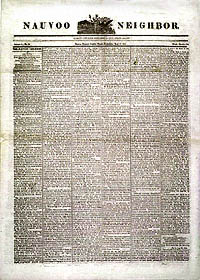
An edition of the Nauvoo Neighbor

The Nauvoo Neighbor was a weekly newspaper edited and published by Latter Day Saint apostle John Taylor in Nauvoo, Illinois, from 1843 to 1845. While it was not an official publication of the Church of Jesus Christ of Latter Day Saints, the Neighbor was consistently pro-Mormon and its primary target audience was the Latter Day Saint residents of Nauvoo. When The Wasp ceased publication in April 1843, the Neighbor replaced it as Nauvoo's premier secular newspaper.

The Neighbor reported on local, state, national, and international news and also commonly featured agricultural, commercial, scientific, and religious news as well as excerpts of literature. It, along with Times and Seasons, was the primary vehicle in which a Latter Day Saint perspective on the incarceration and death of Joseph Smith was transmitted to the public.

The first edition of the Nauvoo Neighbor was dated March 3, 1843. The final edition was published on October 29, 1845. Publication ceased when the majority of Latter Day Saints, including Taylor, decided to leave Nauvoo and emigrate to the Salt Lake Valley under the direction of Brigham Young.

== See also ==
- The Evening and the Morning Star
- Messenger and Advocate
- Elders' Journal
- Millennial Star
- List of Latter Day Saint periodicals
