= Gospel Reflector =

First issue of The Gospel Reflector January, 1841.

The Gospel Reflector was the first independent Mormon periodical. It was published by Benjamin Winchester, the president of the Philadelphia Branch of the Church of Jesus Christ of Latter Day Saints.

The Gospel Reflector was published bi-weekly beginning in January 1841 and ended with the twelfth issue in June 1841. Its motto was "When God works who can hinder?"

Benjamin Winchester’s publication was not well regarded by Church leadership. In the January 1845 publication of the Times and Seasons, Parley P. Pratt wrote of The Gospel Reflector “vast sums are expended by men who have but little experience in publishing, and perhaps pay double for the paper and printing… In this way thousands of dollars are drawn from the saints and from the elders, while the temple cause is neglected.” The same article went on to instruct the readers of the Times and Seasons “Let the books, tracts, periodicals, pamphlets, &c. of Mr. B. Winchester and others no longer be patronized by the saints.”

== See also ==
- The Evening and the Morning Star
- Messenger and Advocate
- Elders' Journal
- Millennial Star
- List of Latter Day Saint periodicals
