= List of Latter Day Saint periodicals =

Mormon newspapers and magazine

The Latter Day Saint movement is the collection of independent church groups that trace their origins to a Christian Restorationist movement founded by Joseph Smith in the late 1820s. There have been periodicals associated with the institutions, people, or issues of the movement since before the Smith's death in 1844, as well as later publications associated with groups formed from splits after his death.

== Early periodicals ==
The following began publication before Joseph Smith's death on 27 June 1844, after which several followers declared themselves his successor and split into various groups.

Title	Operation	Format	Purpose	Publisher	Location	Notes
The Evening and the Morning Star	1832–34	monthly newspaper	Official organ of the Church	W. W. Phelps	Independence, Missouri	Press destroyed in 1833. Oliver Cowdery resumed in Kirtland, Ohio. Available online at Brigham Young University
Messenger and Advocate	1834–1837	monthly newspaper	Official organ of the Church	Oliver Cowdery, editor	Kirtland, Ohio	Replaced The Evening and the Morning Star. Later editors: John Whitmer, Warren A. Cowdery. Available online at Centerplace.org
Elders' Journal	1837–38	monthly newspaper	Official organ of the Church	Don Carlos Smith, editor	Kirtland, Ohio	Two issues in Ohio and two more from Far West, Missouri. Available online courtesy of the Church History Library at Archive.org
Times and Seasons	1839–1846	monthly / semi-monthly newspaper	Official organ of the Church	Don Carlos Smith, editor	Nauvoo, Illinois	Later editors: Joseph Smith, John Taylor and Willard Richards. Available online at Brigham Young University
Millennial Star	1840–1970	monthly / semi-monthly / weekly newspaper	Official organ of the Church	British Mission	Manchester, England	Replaced by the Ensign in 1970. Issues published between 1840–1900 available online at Brigham Young University, issues published between 1901–1970 available online at Archive.org
Gospel Reflector	1841	semi-monthly	Independent religious messages affiliated with the Church	Benjamin Winchester, editor	Philadelphia	
The Wasp	1842–43	weekly newspaper	Unofficial, supportive of the Church	William Smith	Nauvoo, Illinois	Also referred to as Nauvoo Wasp. Replaced by Nauvoo Neighbor.
Nauvoo Neighbor	1843–1845	weekly newspaper	Unofficial, supportive of the Church	John Taylor	Nauvoo, Illinois	Replaced The Wasp. Became Hancock Eagle under Dr. W. E. Matlack in 1845, then Nauvoo New Citizen under Samuel Slocum in 1846. Available online at Book of Abraham Project
Gospel Light	1843–44	occasional newspaper	Unofficial, supportive of the Church	John E. Page	Pittsburgh, Pennsylvania	Replaced by People's Organ.
The Prophet	1844–45	weekly newspaper	Official organ of the Church	Parley P. Pratt	New York City	First edited by George T. Leach, then William Smith, then Samuel Brannan. Replaced by the New-York Messenger during 1845.
The New-York Messenger	1845	weekly newspaper	Official organ of the Church	Parley P. Pratt	New York City	Edited by Samuel Brannan. Successor to The Prophet during 1845.
People's Organ	1844	biweekly newspaper	Unofficial, supportive of the Church	John E. Page	Pittsburgh, Pennsylvania	Replaced Gospel Light.

== The Church of Jesus Christ of Latter-day Saints ==
Compared with other sects in the Latter Day Saint movement, The Church of Jesus Christ of Latter-day Saints (LDS Church) is by far the largest and has published the most.

=== Official ===
The following were published by the LDS Church or one of its auxiliaries, and are considered official church publications.

Title	Operation	Format	Purpose	Publisher	Location	Notes
The Young Woman's Journal	1897–1929	monthly	LDS young women	YLMIA	Salt Lake City, Utah	Absorbed into Improvement Era. Available online at Brigham Young University
Improvement Era	1897–1970	monthly magazine	Official LDS Church magazine	LDS Church	Salt Lake City, Utah	Replaced The Contributor. Replaced by the New Era and the Ensign. Available online courtesy of the LDS Church History Library at Archive.org
Mutual Improvement Messenger	1897–1931	??	Bulletin for M.I.A. of Salt Lake City.	LDS Church	Salt Lake City, Utah	
Conference Report	1897–2017	semi-annual report	Transcripts of the proceedings of LDS Church General Conferences	LDS Church	Salt Lake City, Utah	Published by Deseret News until 1965. Published by the Church until 2017. Succeeded by the reports in the Church’s magazines. Available online courtesy of the LDS Church History Library at Archive.org
The Juvenile Instructor	1901–1929	monthly	LDS youth	Deseret Sunday School Union	Salt Lake City, Utah	Sunday School organization took over from George Q. Cannon. Replaced by The Instructor. Available online courtesy of the LDS Church History Library at Archive.org
The Children's Friend	1902–1970	monthly magazine	Official Primary children's magazine	Primary Association	Salt Lake City, Utah	Replaced by The Friend
Relief Society Magazine	1914–1970	monthly magazine	Official organ of the Relief Society	Relief Society	Salt Lake City, Utah	Known as the Relief Society Bulletin for its first year, converted to an illustrated magazine in 1915. Indirectly replaced the Woman's Exponent. Replaced by the Ensign. Available online courtesy of Brigham Young University at Archive.org
The Instructor	1930–1970	monthly magazine	Official Sunday School periodical	Deseret Sunday School Union	Salt Lake City, Utah	Replaced The Juvenile Instructor. Replaced by the Ensign and the New Era. Available online courtesy of the LDS Church History Library at Archive.org
Bulletin	1956–1997	occasional circulars	Updates to church policies and programs	Correlation Department	Salt Lake City, Utah	Was Messenger (1956–1964), Priesthood Bulletin (1965–1974), Messages (1975–1980). Superseded by church handbooks.
Ensign	1971–2020	monthly magazine	Official LDS Church magazine	LDS Church	Salt Lake City, Utah	Replaced several LDS periodicals. Current and back issues available online at churchofjesuschrist.org
New Era	1971–2020	monthly magazine	Official LDS Church youth magazine	LDS Church	Salt Lake City, Utah	With the Ensign, replaced the Improvement Era. Current and back issues available online at churchofjesuschrist.org
The Friend	1971–current	monthly magazine	Official LDS Church children's magazine	LDS Church	Salt Lake City, Utah	Replaced The Children's Friend. Current and back issues available online at churchofjesuschrist.org
Liahona	1977–current	annual-monthly magazine	Official LDS Church international magazine	LDS Church	Salt Lake City, Utah	Entitled Tambuli until 1995. Available in many languages. Current and back issues available online at churchofjesuschrist.org
For the Strength of Youth	2021–current	annual-monthly magazine	Official LDS Church youth magazine	LDS Church	Salt Lake City, Utah	Replaced the New Era. Available in many languages. Current and back issues available online at churchofjesuschrist.org

=== Affiliated ===
The following were published under the sponsorship of the LDS Church or a Church-owned institution or informally adopted by a church auxiliary, but are not considered official church publications.

Title	Operation	Format	Purpose	Publisher	Location	Notes
The Frontier Guardian	1849–1852	biweekly newspaper	Pro-LDS news	Orson Hyde	Kanesville, Iowa	Was the LDS Church's only periodical in the U.S. for over a year.
Deseret News	1850–current	weekly / semi-weekly / daily newspaper	Voice of the State of Deseret	Deseret News Publishing Company	Salt Lake City, Utah	Other names include Deseret Evening News and Deseret Morning News. Available online for years 1850–1910 at the University of Utah Digital Newspapers Collection
Deseret Almanac	1851–1866	annual almanac	General almanac with LDS religious and cultural articles	W. W. Phelps	Salt Lake City, Utah	Entitled Almanac from 1859 to 1864.
The Seer	1853–1854	monthly magazine	Periodical defending the LDS Church	Orson Pratt	Washington, D.C.	Available online at Brigham Young University
Zion's Watchman	1853–1856	monthly		Augustus Farnham	Sydney, Australia	
The Mormon	1854–1857	weekly newspaper	Defending the LDS Church	John Taylor	New York City	
Journal of Discourses	1854–1886	sixteen-page semi-monthly	Sermons of LDS leaders	George D. Watt	Liverpool, England	Watt was succeeded by David W. Evans, then George W. Gibbs. Available online at Brigham Young University
St. Louis Luminary	1854–55	weekly newspaper	LDS Church events, emigration news	Erastus Snow, editor	St. Louis	
Western Standard	1856–57	weekly newspaper	Defense of LDS Church	George Q. Cannon	San Francisco.	Available online at the Internet Archive
The Juvenile Instructor	1866–1900	monthly	LDS youth	George Q. Cannon	Salt Lake City, Utah	Became an official Sunday School publication in 1901. Available online courtesy of the LDS Church History Library at Archive.org
Woman's Exponent	1872–1914	monthly newspaper	Independent voice for LDS women	Lula Greene Richards	Salt Lake City, Utah	Emmeline B. Wells was editor in 1872–1914. Available online at Brigham Young University
The Contributor	1879–1896	monthly	Independent periodical for LDS youth	Junius F. Wells	Salt Lake City, Utah	Replaced by Improvement Era. Available online courtesy of the LDS Church History Library at Archive.org
Southern Star	1898–1900	weekly newspaper	LDS news and doctrine	Southern States Mission	Chattanooga, Tennessee	Replaced Dixie Messenger.
The Elders' Journal	1903–1907	monthly / semi-monthly magazine	LDS news, doctrine and reprints	Southern States Mission	Atlanta, Georgia	Moved to Chattanooga in 1904. Replaced by Liahona, the Elders' Journal. Not to be confused with the nineteenth century publication edited by Joseph Smith's brother.
The Liahona	1907	weekly newspaper	LDS news and doctrine	Missions of the LDS Church	Independence, Missouri	Replaced by Liahona, the Elders' Journal.
Liahona, the Elders' Journal	1907–1942	weekly newspaper	LDS news, doctrine and reprints	Missions of the LDS Church	Independence, Missouri	Consolidated The Elders' Journal (1903) and The Liahona (1907).
Utah Genealogical and Historical Magazine	1910–1940	quarterly magazine	Genealogical instruction and data; historical and doctrinal articles	Genealogical Society of Utah	Salt Lake City, Utah	
Church News	1931–current	weekly tabloid	General LDS news	Deseret News Publishing Company	Salt Lake City, Utah	Available in Utah with Deseret News subscription and via mail elsewhere. Current and back issues from 1988 available online at Church News
Week-Day Religious Education	1937–1940, 1959	occasional magazine	LDS seminary and institute teachers and directors	Department of Education, LDS Church	Salt Lake City, Utah	Issued to professional LDS religious educators in 1937-40, and again during the year 1959.
Speeches of the Year	1953–current	annual report	Compilation of mostly religious speeches given throughout the academic year at BYU	Brigham Young University Press	Provo, Utah	Available online from 2005 to the present at Brigham Young University
BYU Studies	1959–current	biannual / quarterly journal	Multidisciplinary LDS articles	Brigham Young University	Provo, Utah	Available online at BYU Studies.
Impact: Weekday Religious Education Quarterly	1967–1970	quarterly magazine	LDS seminary and institute teachers and directors	Dept. of Seminaries and Institutes of Religion	Provo, Utah	Available online at Internet Archive.
The Church in Action: Yearbook of Activities	1971–72	annual	Facts and statistics of the LDS Church	Deseret News Company	Salt Lake City, Utah	Replaced by the Church Almanac.
Church Almanac	1974–2013	annual / biennial	Facts and statistics of the LDS Church	Deseret News Publishing Company	Salt Lake City, Utah	Biennial issues from 1984–2002. No issue published in 2014. Some material online at Church News
Insights	1980–2012	semi-annual / tri-annual / quarterly / bi-monthly / monthly newsletter	Updates on LDS-related scholarly research by FARMS	FARMS	Provo, Utah	Has carried the subtitles "An Ancient Window" and "A Window on the Ancient World". Available online at Maxwell Institute
The Restored Gospel and Applied Christianity	1987–current	annual	Student essays in honor of President David O. McKay	Center for the study of Christian Values in Literature and the Religious Studies Center, Brigham Young University	Provo, Utah	Initially entitled The Restoration of the Gospel and applied Christianity.
Mormon Studies Review	1989–current	annual / semi-annual journal	Review essays on Mormonism within religious studies. Formerly focused on LDS apologetics.	Maxwell Institute (formerly FARMS)	Provo, Utah	Formerly Review of Books on the Book of Mormon (1989–1995), FARMS Review of Books (1996–2002), FARMS Review (2003–2010). Transitioned to a review journal in 2014. Following Vol. 6 (2019), ownership transferred to University of Illinois Press.
Journal of Book of Mormon Studies	1992–current	annual / semi-annual journal	Research by believing LDS scholars	Maxwell Institute (formerly FARMS)	Provo, Utah	Was Journal of the Book of Mormon and Other Restoration Scripture from 2009–2013. Available online at Maxwell Institute
LDS Living	2000–current	bi-monthly magazine	LDS lifestyle	Deseret Book Company	Salt Lake City, Utah	
Religious Educator	2000–current	semi-annual / tri-annual journal	LDS gospel teaching	BYU Religious Studies Center	Provo, Utah	
Religious Education Review	2008–current	semi-annual magazine	Updates on the activities of Religious Education at BYU	BYU Religious Studies Center	Provo, Utah	Replaced the RSC Newsletter, which had been published since 1986.
Studies in the Bible and Antiquity	2009–current	annual journal	LDS research on the Bible and ancient religion	Neal A. Maxwell Institute for Religious Scholarship	Provo, Utah	Available online at Maxwell Institute

== Other Latter Day Saint denominations ==
The following were published by religious groups in the Latter Day Saint movement, excluding the LDS Church.

Title	Operation	Format	Purpose	Publisher	Location	Notes
Latter Day Saints' Messenger and Advocate	1844–1846	monthly / semi-monthly newspaper	Rigdonite Church of Christ messages	Ebenezer Robinson	Pittsburgh, Pennsylvania	Named after the 1834 paper. Became Messenger and Advocate of the Church of Christ in 1845. Available online at LDS Church History Library
Voree Herald	January–November 1846	monthly newspaper	Organ of the Church of Jesus Christ of Latter Day Saints (Strangite)	James J. Strang	Voree, Wisconsin	Replaced by Zion's Reveille.
Star in the East	November 1846	monthly newspaper	Organ of the Church of Jesus Christ of Latter Day Saints (Strangite)	George J. Adams	Boston, Massachusetts	One issue exists. Morgan suggests that a second issue was printed in December and a third in January, but this is doubtful.
Zion's Reveille	December 1846 – 16 September 1847	monthly, later weekly newspaper	Organ of the Church of Jesus Christ of Latter Day Saints (Strangite)	James J. Strang	Voree, Wisconsin	Replaced Voree Herald and was replaced by Gospel Herald.
Ensign of Liberty	March 1847 – August 1849	occasional newspaper	Supporting the Church of Christ (Whitmerite)	William E. McLellin	Kirtland, Ohio	
Gospel Herald	23 September 1847 – 6 June 1850	weekly newspaper	Organ of the Church of Jesus Christ of Latter Day Saints (Strangite)	James J. Strang	Voree, Wisconsin	Replaced Zion's Reveille and was replaced by The Northern Islander when church headquarters relocated to Beaver Island in Lake Michigan.
Zion's Standard: A Voice from the Smith Family	12 March 1848	one issue only	Organ of the Church of Jesus Christ of Latter Day Saints (Williamite)	William B. Smith	Palestine Grove, Illinois (near Amboy, Illinois)	Smith organized his own church after breaking with James J. Strang. Replaced by the Melchisedek & Aaronic Herald.
Melchisedek & Aaronic Herald	1 February 1849 – 1850	monthly newspaper	Organ of the Church of Jesus Christ of Latter Day Saints (Williamite)	Isaac Sheen	Covington, Kentucky	Initially named Aaronic Herald, the paper ended when Isaac Sheen fell out of communion with William B. Smith. Sheen was later editor of the True Latter Day Saints Herald.
Northern Islander	12 December 1850 – 20 June 1856	weekly, later daily newspaper	Organ of the Church of Jesus Christ of Latter Day Saints (Strangite) and general newspaper for Beaver Island and vicinity	Cooper & Chidester	St. James, Michigan	Replaced Gospel Herald when church headquarters relocated to Beaver Island in Lake Michigan.
Zion's Messenger	1854–54		Gladdenite messages	Gladden Bishop	Council Bluffs, Iowa	
Herald	1860–current	newspaper / magazine	Official RLDS/Community of Christ periodical	Herald House	Cincinnati (1860)	Was True Latter Day Saints' Herald until 1876 and Saints' Herald until 2001. Published from Cincinnati, Plano, IL (1863), Lamoni, IA (1881), Independence, MO (1921).
Zion's Hope	1869–1944	semi-monthly magazine	RLDS children's magazine	RLDS Church	Plano, Illinois (1869)	Later moved to Lamoni, Iowa, then Independence, Missouri.
Autumn Leaves	1888–1929	magazine	RLDS youth magazine	Marietta Walker	Lamoni, Iowa	Changed name to Vision in 1929, and discontinued in 1932.
The Return	1889–1900	monthly paper	Church of Christ (Whitmerite) periodical	Ebenezer Robinson, founding editor	Davis City, Iowa	
Journal of History	1908–1925	bi-monthly paper	RLDS historical topics	RLDS Church	Lamoni, Iowa	
Zion's Advocate	1922–current	bi-monthly paper	Organ of the Church of Christ (Temple Lot)	Church of Christ	Independence, Missouri	
The Voice of Warning	1930–current		Organ of the Church of Christ (Fettingite)	Church of Christ	Independence, Missouri	Was briefly published in two locations, "due to dissention among the ranks".
Truth	1935–1956	monthly magazine	Organ of the Short Creek Community	Truth Publishing Company	Salt Lake City	Founded by Mormon fundamentalist leader Joseph White Musser following a commission from Lorin C. Woolley. After a schism in the movement, Truth was edited by Guy H. Musser, while the elder Musser began the rival Star of Truth magazine.
Gospel News	1938–current	monthly magazine	Organ of The Church of Jesus Christ (Bickertonite)	The Church of Jesus Christ Printhouse	Greensburg, Pennsylvania	
The Voice of Peace	1944–current		Organ of the Church of Christ With the Elijah Message	Church of Christ With the Elijah Message	Independence, Missouri	Replaced the Voice of Warning for this new sect.
Ensign	1961–1965	monthly	Organ of the Church of the Firstborn (LeBaron order)	U.S. Mission of the Church of the Firstborn of the Fullness of Times	Galeana, Chihuahua, Mexico	
Messenger	1991–2006	quarterly magazine	Mormon fundamentalism		Birmingham, England	Until 1997 was Truth Seeker Magazine. Moved to USA in 2003 and became bi-monthly.
Tidings of Zion	1993–current	bimonthly newsletter	News and messages for Restoration Branches	Conference of Restoration Elders	Independence, Missouri	
The Hastening Times	1999–current	quarterly magazine	Organ of the Remnant Church of Jesus Christ of Latter Day Saints	Remnant Church of Jesus Christ of Latter Day Saints	Independence, Missouri	
The Latter Day Saints' Beacon	2008–current	magazine, five times annually	Official magazine of the Joint Conference of Restoration Branches	Joint Conference of Restoration Branches	Independence, Missouri	
The Anchor	before 2009–current	monthly newsletter	Great Lakes Restoration Branches	Garden City Restoration Branch	Romeo, Michigan	
The Greater Light: The End Times Messenger	before 2010–current	monthly magazine	Organ of the Church of Christ (Assured Way)	Church of Christ (Assured Way)	Independence, Missouri	

== Independent ==
The following were not published by a Latter Day Saint church or official religious group, but were independently operated and controlled.

Title	Operation	Format	Purpose	Publisher	Location	Notes
Keepapitchinin (Keep-A-Pitchinin)	1867–1871	occasional / semi-weekly newspaper	humor	George J. Taylor, editor	Salt Lake City, Utah	Editors were sons of Apostles John Taylor, Charles C. Rich, and Willard Richards. Orson Pratt contributed occasionally. Some volumes available online at HathiTrust Digital Library
Historical Record	1882–1890	monthly	Mormon history.	Andrew Jenson	Salt Lake City, Utah	Continuation in English of Danish-language Morgenstjernen.
Utah Historical Quarterly	1928–current	quarterly journal	Utah history, often relating to LDS	Utah State Historical Society	Salt Lake City, Utah	Available online.
Pioneer	1936–current	quarterly journal	Mormon pioneer genealogy and history.	National Society, Sons of Utah Pioneers	Salt Lake City, Utah	Titled SUP news from 1955 to 1965.
Heart Throbs of the West	1939–1951	annual volume	Pioneer transcriptions, accounts, and local history	Daughters of Utah Pioneers	Salt Lake City, Utah	Lessons for study at DUP "camps," compiled by Kate B. Carter.
Mormon Heritage Magazine	1944–1986, 1994–1995	bimonthly magazine	Historical sketches, records, and data	Publication swers	Denver, Colorado (then Colorado Springs)	Ceased publication in 1986 and was briefly revived in 1994 in Colorado Springs.
Treasures of Pioneer History	1952–1957	annual volume	Pioneer transcriptions, accounts, and local history	Daughters of Utah Pioneers	Salt Lake City, Utah	Lessons for study at DUP "camps," compiled by Kate B. Carter. Replaced Heart Throbs of the West.
Our Pioneer Heritage	1958–1977	annual volume	Pioneer transcriptions, accounts, and local history	Daughters of Utah Pioneers	Salt Lake City, Utah	Lessons for study at DUP "camps," compiled by Kate B. Carter. Replaced Treasures of Pioneer History.
Dialogue: A Journal of Mormon Thought	1966–current	quarterly journal	Independent scholarship on Mormonism	Dialogue Foundation	Salt Lake City, Utah	Begun at Stanford University. Available online.
The Witness	1968–current	quarterly magazine	Research and devotional ministry for the Book of Mormon	The Book of Mormon Foundation	Independence, Missouri	Originally published as the newsletter for the Foundation for Research on Ancient America.
Mormon History	1968–1970	Monthly loose-leaf	Reprints of documents and college papers related to LDS history	David C. and Karla Martin	Mt. Prospect, Illinois; Janesville, Wisconsin	
The Carpenter: Reflections of Mormon Life	1969–1971	quarterly journal	LDS literature and art	The Carpenter	Madison, Wisconsin	Produced by students and faculty at University of Wisconsin–Madison and its LDS Institute of Religion.
Tangents	1969–1976?	annual journal	student papers, literature, and poetry	BYU Honors Program	Provo, Utah	Often included Mormon-related articles.
Courage: A Journal of History, Thought and Action	1970–1973	quarterly journal	Independent scholarship on Latter Day Saint thought	Venture Foundation	Lamoni, Iowa	Similar to Dialogue, but primarily by RLDS Church members.
Journal of Mormon History	1974–current	annual / semi-annual / tri-annual / quarterly journal	Independent scholarly LDS history	Mormon History Association	Orem, Utah	Available online.
Exponent II	1974–2006; 2010–current	quarterly newspaper / magazine	Independent feminist LDS women	Exponent II, Inc.	Arlington, Massachusetts	Named in honor of Woman's Exponent. New issues and older issues available online.
Sunstone Magazine	1975–current	occasional magazine	Independent discussions of Mormonism	Sunstone Education Foundation	Salt Lake City, Utah	Begun at UC Berkeley. Available online.
Issues in Religion and Psychotherapy	1975–current	biennial	Counseling and Psychotherapy of Mormons	The Association of Mormon Counselors and Psychotherapists (AMCAP)	Salt Lake City, Utah	was AMCAP Journal
Beehive Standard Weekly	1975–2006	weekly newspaper	Conservative LDS news	Rob Graham	Las Vegas, Nevada	The Beehive paper became Nevada Beehive, then Beehive Weekly Standard.
The Beehive	1975–current	quarterly newspaper	LDS news and community in Arizona	Amie Taylor, editor	Mesa, Arizona	The Beehive paper became Arizona Beehive, then renamed back to The Beehive.
Restoration Voice	1978–current	bimonthly magazine	Traditional reorganization viewpoints	Cumorah Books	Independence, Missouri	
AML Annual	1978–2004	annual	Academic literary journal	Association for Mormon Letters	Provo, Utah	
An Enduring Legacy	1978–1989	annual volume	Pioneer transcriptions, accounts, and local history	Daughters of Utah Pioneers	Salt Lake City, Utah	Lessons for study at DUP "camps." Replaced Our Pioneer Heritage.
This People	1979–1998	bi-monthly / quarterly magazine	Independent LDS lifestyle magazine	Utah Alliance Publishing	Provo, Utah	Editors include Sheri L. Dew, Scot and Maurine Proctor, Jim Bell.
Restoration Studies	1980–current	annual	academic journal publishing theology and religious and cultural studies in the Latter Day Saint movement	John Whitmer Historical Association	Independence, Missouri	Until 2009 published by the Community of Christ Temple School.
Affinity	1980–current	monthly newsletter	Gay and lesbian LDS news and issues	Affirmation: Gay & Lesbian Mormons	Los Angeles	Some issues available online.
Mormon Pacific Historical Society Journal	1980–1995	annual journal	LDS history in Hawaii and the Pacific Islands	Mormon Pacific Historical Society		Proceedings of annual conferences.
The San Diego Seagull	1981–2017	newspaper	Issues for Latter-day Saints in San Diego	The San Diego Seagull	San Diego, California	
John Whitmer Historical Association Journal	1981–current	annual journal	Latter Day Saint movement historical articles	John Whitmer Historical Association	Independence, Missouri	Founded by RLDS Church members. Available online.
Seventh East Press	1981–1983	semi-monthly 16-page newspaper	Independent voice on BYU and LDS issues	BYU students	Provo, Utah	Shut down due to printing articles on controversial topics. Available online.
The Sunstone Review	1981–1984	monthly journal	Reviews of movies, books, politics, and current LDS Church events	Sunstone Foundation	Salt Lake City, Utah	
Journal of Latter Day Saint History	1982–2001?	quarterly	Research on the wider Latter Day Saint movement	Steven L. Shields, Restoration Research Foundation	Bountiful, Utah; El Segundo, California	Originally titled Restoration: News, Views and History of the Latter Day Saint Movement.
Student Review	1986–2000?	weekly newspaper	Independent off-campus BYU student news	BYU students	Provo, Utah	Articles by non-journalism students, including LDS-faithful and controversial coverage. Ended after low student interest. Revived in electronic format in late 2011.
Latter-day Woman	1986–?	bimonthly journal	Mormon Women	Latter-Day Woman, Inc.	Sandy, Utah	Currently, there is an unrelated online magazine using a similar name: Latter-day Woman Magazine.
Vision	1989–current	quarterly magazine	Restoration Branch messages and news	Price Publishing	Independence, Missouri	
Nauvoo Journal	1989–1999	annual / semi-annual journal	Independent LDS histories	Early Mormon Research Institute	Salt Lake City, Utah	Replaced by Mormon Historical Studies. Available online.
Mormon Women's Forum Quarterly	1989–1998	quarterly journal	Independent LDS feminism	The Mormon Women's Forum	Salt Lake City, Utah	
Zarahemla: A Forum for LDS Poetry	1990–1992	quarterly ??	LDS poetry			
Chronicles of Courage	1990–1997	annual volume	Pioneer transcriptions, accounts, and local history	Daughters of Utah Pioneers	Salt Lake City, Utah	Lessons for study at DUP "camps." Replaced An Enduring Legacy.
Latter-day Digest	1992–1994	monthly journal	LDS literature and art	Latter-day Foundation for the Arts	Orem, Utah	
Wasatch Review International	1992–1996	biannual	A Mormon literary journal.	Wasatch Review International	Orem, Utah	
Vigor: Advice & Commentary on Mormon Life	1993–1999	irregular newsletter	"Common problems, challenges, and opportunities…in ordinary Mormon life".	Orson Scott Card, editor	Greensboro, North Carolina	Originally online at CompuServe. Issues freely printed and distributed by readers. Available online.
Pioneer Pathways	1998–2008	annual volume	Pioneer transcriptions, accounts, and local history	Daughters of Utah Pioneers	Salt Lake City, Utah	Lessons for study at DUP "camps." Replaced Chronicles of Courage.
Irreantum	1999–2013	quarterly / semiannual journal	Poetry, prose and criticism for, by and about Mormons	Association for Mormon Letters	Orem, Utah	Included with AML membership or available separately. Available online.
Latter-day Saint Historical Studies	2000–current	semi-annual journal	Independent LDS histories	Ensign Peak Foundation	Salt Lake City, Utah	Replaced Nauvoo Journal. Formerly titled Mormon Historical Studies. Available online.
Collegiate Post	2001–2007	occasional magazine	Semi-independent voice on BYU and LDS issues	BYU students, College of Humanities, Honors Dept.	Provo, Utah	Shut down after controversial article by Ashley Sanders.
Desert Saints Magazine	2001 – December 2012	monthly magazine	LDS community, fun and inspiration	Ellis Media, Inc.	Henderson, Nevada	Freely distributed at businesses in Southern Utah and Southern Nevada.
LDS Living	2002–current	bi-monthly magazine	LDS lifestyle magazine	Deseret Book	Salt Lake City, Utah	
Latter-day Trumpet	2003–2011	monthly newspaper	LDS interests and community in Southern California	Craig S. Nelson	Upland, California	
LatterDayBride Magazine	2005–current	annual magazine	LDS wedding planning	LatterDayBride	Salt Lake City, Utah	
Segullah	2005–current	tri-annual journal	LDS women's literary magazine	Segullah Group	Provo, Utah	Biannual until 2007. Online only after 2013. Also publishes books and blog. Available online.
Element: A Journal of Mormon Philosophy and Theology	2005–current	semi-annual journal	Academic journal of Mormon philosophy	Society for Mormon Philosophy and Theology	Orem, Utah	Not issued during 2010–2014. Available online and from SMPT website.
The Mormon Worker	2007–2011	occasional newspaper	LDS support for leftist economic and social ideals	William Van Wagenen	Woodland Hills, Utah	Issues are published online as well as via annual print subscriptions.
International Journal of Mormon Studies	2008–2013	annual journal	Independent scholarship on Mormonism globally	David M. Morris, European Mormon Studies Association	Staffordshire, United Kingdom	Was British Journal of Mormon Studies until 2009 . Online (printed by special order).
Mormon Artist	2008–2011	bi-monthly / quarterly magazine	LDS arts community coverage and interviews	Ben Crowder	Provo, Utah	Available in both print and web editions. No longer published in an issue format as of Fall 2011.
SquareTwo	2008–current	tri-annual electronic journal	Faithful LDS Thought on Contemporary World Issues	Valerie M. Hudson		Editorial team includes Ralph C. Hancock, John Mark Mattox, Susan R. Madsen, Neylan McBaine, George B. Handley Available online.
The Mormon Review	2009–2011	quarterly electronic journal	Reviews of general works by Mormon thinkers	Richard Bushman, Editor in Chief		Editorial board includes James Faulconer, Daniel Fairbanks, Terryl Givens, and Margaret Blair Young. Last issue was in 2011.
Museum Memories	2009–current	annual volume	Pioneer transcriptions, accounts, and local history	Daughters of Utah Pioneers	Salt Lake City, Utah	Lessons for study at DUP "camps." Replaced Pioneer Pathways.
The Claremont Journal of Mormon Studies	2011	electronic journal	Academic Mormon studies and new research	Claremont Mormon Studies Student Association	Claremont, California	Student-run electronic journal. Website shows only inaugural issue.
Interpreter: A Journal of Latter-day Saint Faith and Scholarship	2012–current	occasional electronic journal	LDS apologetics and scholarship on the scriptures of LDS Church	Interpreter Foundation, Daniel C. Peterson, editor	Orem, Utah	Formerly Interpreter: A Journal of Mormon Scripture. Available online.
The Salt Lake City Messenger	1964–2022	Biannual newsletter	Criticism of Mormon history	Utah Lighthouse Ministries	Salt Lake City	Founded by Jerald and Sandra Tanner
Wayfare	2022–current	Biannual print magazine	LDS magazine of culture and ideas	Faith Matters	Cambridge, Massachusetts	Essays, poetry, fiction and art.

== Non-English ==
The following were published in languages other than English.

Title	Operation	Format	Purpose	Publisher	Location	Notes
Prophwyd y Jubili (Prophet of the Jubilee)	1846–1848	monthly newspaper	Official LDS periodical in Wales	Dan Jones	Rhydybont, Wales	In Welsh. Printed in Carmarthen in 1848. Succeeded by Udgorn Seion.
Udgorn Seion (Zion's Trumpet)	1849–1862	monthly / biweekly / weekly newspaper	Official LDS periodical in Wales	John S. Davis	Carmarthen, Wales	In Welsh. Replaced Prophwyd y Jubili. Later produced by Dan Jones, Daniel Daniels, Benjamin Evans, George Q. Cannon, at Merthyr Tydfil, Swansea, Liverpool.
Étoile du Déséret (Star of Deseret)	1851–1852	monthly newspaper	Official LDS periodical in France	John Taylor, editor	Paris, France	In French.
Skandinaviens Stjerne (Star of Scandinavia)	1851–1956	monthly / semi-monthly	Official LDS periodical in Scandinavia	Erastus Snow, editor	Copenhagen, Denmark	In Danish. Available online at LDS Church History Library and archive.org
Zion's Panier (Zion's Banner)	1851–52	monthly / semi-monthly	Official LDS periodical in Germany	John Taylor	Hamburg, Germany	In German.
Le Réflecteur (The Reflector)	1853	monthly	Official LDS publication in Romandy	T. B. H. Stenhouse	Lausanne, Switzerland	In French.
Der Darsteller der Heiligen der letzten Tage (The Protagonists of the Saints of the Last Days)	1855–1861	monthly / irregular paper	Official German LDS periodical	Daniel Tyler, Swiss-Italian Mission	Geneva, Switzerland	In German. Later published at Bern and Zürich.
Die Reform (The Reform)	1862–1864	monthly	Official German LDS periodical	John L. Smith, Swiss-Italian-German Mission	Geneva, Switzerland	In German. Replaced by Der Stern in 1869.
Der Stern (The Star)	1869–1999	monthly / semi-monthly magazine	Official LDS periodical in Germany.	Karl G. Maeser, Swiss-German Mission	Zürich, Switzerland	In German. Semi-monthly from 1882 to 1940. Later published from Hamburg, Dresden, Berlin, Frankfurt. Available online at LDS Church History Library
Nordstjernan: sanningen, kunskapen, dygden och tron äro förenade (The Northstar)	1877–?	semi-monthly	Official LDS periodical in Sweden.	N. C. Flygare, editor, Scandinavian Mission	Copenhagen, Denmark	In Swedish. Later published from Goteborg, Sweden, by the Swedish Mission.
La Voz del desierto (The Voice of the Desert)	1879	monthly	"Organo de la Rama mexicana de La Iglesia Christiana de los Santos de los Ultimos Dias." (Organ of the Mexican branch of the LDS Church)	M. Hernandez	Mexico City, Mexico	In Spanish. Apparently published for at least two issues in 1879.
Morgenstjernen (The Morningstar)	1879?–1885	monthly	Mormon history	Andrew Jenson	Copenhagen, Denmark to 1881. Then in Salt Lake City, Utah.	In Danish. Continued in English as Historical Record beginning in 1886.
Ungdommens Raadgiver (Counselor of Youth)	1880–1887	monthly	Danish LDS youth	Andrew Jenson, editor	Copenhagen, Denmark	In Danish.
De Ster (The Star)	1896–1999	bimonthly/monthly	Official LDS Dutch-language publication	Fred Pieper, Netherlands/Belgium Mission	Rotterdam, Netherlands	In Dutch. Later published from The Hague and Utrecht. Replaced by the Liahona in 2000.
L'Étoile (The Star)	1920–1940 and 1947–1999	monthly magazine	Official LDS publication in France	LDS Church	Paris, France	In French. Later published from Torcy. Replaced by the Liahona in 2000.
In Yaotlapixqui (The Watchtower)	1937–1939	monthly	Official LDS publication in Mexico	Mexican Mission	Mexico City, Mexico	In Spanish. Initially titled El Atalaya de México
El Mensajero aka El Mensajero Deseret (The Messenger)	1937–1955	monthly	Official LDS periodical in Argentina	W. Ernest Young, editor, Argentine Mission	Buenos Aires, Argentina	In Spanish. Starting in 1947 edited jointly with the Uruguayan Mission. Replaced by the Spanish-language Liahona in 1955.
Sendero Lamanita (Lamanite Way)	1941–1946?	monthly	Official periodical of the Tercero Convención (Third Convention) in Mexico	??Sandoval??	Mexico City, Mexico	In Spanish. The schismatic Tercero Convención published this periodical for members of the Mexican Mission.
A Gaivota (The Seagull)	1948–1952	monthly	Official LDS periodical in Brazil	Brazilian Mission	São Paulo, Brazil	In Portuguese.
Liahona (Portuguese)	1953–1977	monthly magazine	Official LDS publication in Brazil	Brazilian Mission	São Paulo, Brazil	In Portuguese. Replaced A Gaivota.
Liahona (Spanish)	1955–1977	monthly magazine	Official LDS Spanish-language magazine	LDS Church	Mexico City, Mexico	Replaced and unified various Spanish-language periodicals. Published in Mexico City until unified with the other international magazines.
Den Danske Stjerne (The Danish Star)	1956–1999	monthly magazine	Official Danish LDS publication	LDS Church	Copenhagen, Denmark	In Danish. Replaced Der Skandinaviens Stjerne. Renamed Stjernen in 1985. Replaced by the Liahona in 2000.
La Stella (The Star)	1968–1999	monthly magazine	Official LDS Italian-language magazine	Italian Mission	Florence, Italy	In Italian. Later published from Salt Lake City, Utah. Replaced by the Liahona in 2000.
Liahona	1977–current	annual-monthly magazine	Official LDS international magazine	LDS Church	Salt Lake City, Utah	Replaced and unified various older periodicals, all retitled Liahona as of 1999. Available in 51 languages.
Horizon: tijdschrift over de mormoonse gemeenschap (Horizon: magazine about the Mormon community)	1982–83	bi-monthly magazine	independent			In Dutch. Apparently published by local Church members in the Netherlands.
Morumon foramu (Mormon Forum)	1988–2000	semi-annual magazine	Morumon foramu henshubu	Jiro Numano	Shimomatsu City, Japan	In Japanese.
Betrachtungen: Mormonische Kultur und Geisteswelt in Europa (Reflections: Mormon Culture and Intellectual Life in Europe)	1993–1999?	semi-annual journal	Independent journal published by Mormons in Europe	Hartmut Weissmann	Versailles, France; Bremen, Germany	In German, with some articles in French.
Lys over Norge (Light over Norway)	1937–1998	monthly	Official LDS international magazine	LDS Church	Oslo, Norway	In Norwegian. Replaced by the Liahona in 1998.
