= The Prophet (newspaper) =

Former local Latter Day Saint newspaper published in New York City

The Prophet was a local Latter Day Saint newspaper published in New York City, New York, United States. The first editor of the paper was William Smith and the periodical was printed from 1844 to 1845.

The paper was likely founded as part of Joseph Smith's presidential campaign. It resembled other contemporary Mormon newspapers, from which it often published excerpts. Other editors included George T. Leach, Samuel Brannan, A. E. Wright, and Parley P. Pratt. In July 1845 the paper's format and name changed to become the New-York Messenger, which lasted until the end of the year.

== See also ==
- The Evening and the Morning Star
- Messenger and Advocate
- Elders' Journal
- Millennial Star
- List of Latter Day Saint periodicals
- Succession crisis (Latter Day Saints)
