= Jeff Walker =

Jeff Walker or Jeffrey Walker may refer to:

- Jeffrey Walker (director) (born 1982), Australian actor and director
- Jeffrey Walker (cricketer) (born 1960), Australian cricketer
- Jeffrey N. Walker (born 1960), American attorney and academic
- Jeff Walker (American football) (born 1963), American football player
- Jerry Jeff Walker (1942–2020), American country music singer and songwriter
- Jeffrey Walker (chief executive), American chief executive
- Jeff Walker (musician) (born 1969), member of extreme metal band Carcass

== See also ==
- Geoff Walker (disambiguation)
- Jeff James (public servant) (Jeffrey Walker, born 1968), British public servant and executive
