= William J. Reimbold House =

Historic house in Illinois, United States

- U.S. National Register of Historic Places
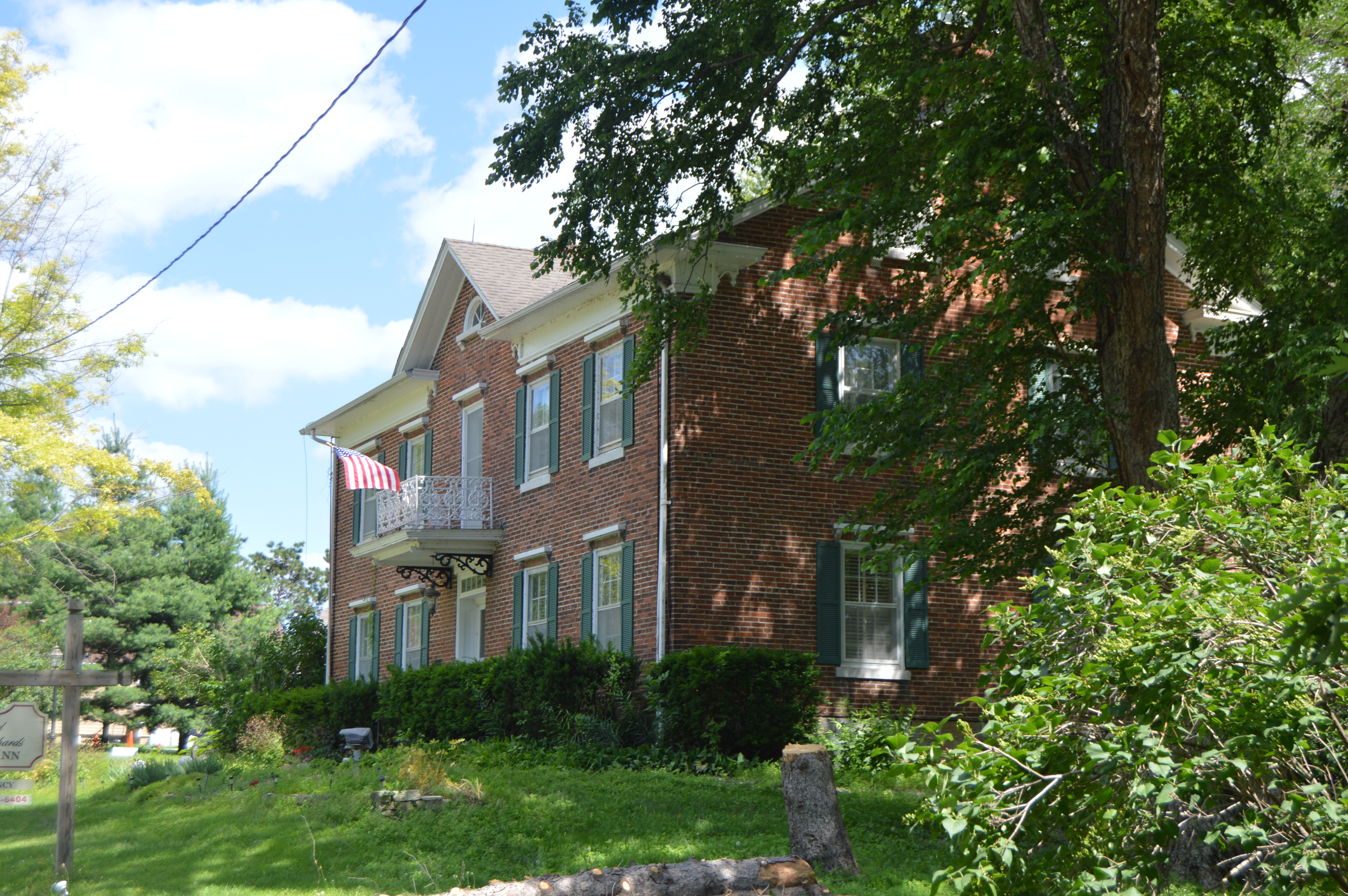

- Location within Illinois Location within the United States
- Location: 950 White St., Nauvoo, Illinois
- Coordinates: 40°32′51″N 91°23′15″W
- Area: 2 acres (0.81 ha)
- Built: 1865-67
- NRHP reference No.: 87002033
- Added to NRHP: December 2, 1987

The William J. Reimbold House is a historic house located at 950 White Street in Nauvoo, Illinois. The house was built in 1865-67 for William J. (1805-1895) and Christina H. (1807-1896) Reimbold, who were part of a wave of German immigrants who settled in Nauvoo in the 1860s and 1870s. After the Mormons and Icarians left the city, the immigrants bought up the vacated land at low prices and were largely responsible for the city's continued development. The Reimbolds were part of the city's winemaking industry, one of the most significant parts of the city economy formed by the immigrants; their stone wine cellar still stands on their property. The Reimbold House is one of two German immigrant homes, and the only one with an intact wine cellar, remaining in Nauvoo's Mormon Flat district, as the rest were destroyed during a period of Mormon restoration in the twentieth century.

The house was added to the National Register of Historic Places on December 2, 1987.

The Reimbold house was built on the site of Willard Richards and Jennetta Richards's home, which was constructed in 1843-1845. Willard Richards was a close friend of the Mormon Prophet Joseph Smith, and served as a member of the Quorum of the Twelve Apostles (LDS Church) from 1840 until his death in 1854. It is now run as a bed and breakfast.

The Reimbolds salvaged elements of the Richards's home, including several doors and door casings. Local tradition also holds that the stair banister from the second floor was salvaged from the James White home that formerly sat near where Parley Street meets the Mississippi River. When Jennetta Richards died on 9 July 1845, she was interred in what was then the family's flower garden. During the excavation of the wine cellar on the west side of the Reimbold home, her remains were discovered. It was noted, "Everything was in splendid preservation, my informant stating that she had not decayed one particle,—even the gloves on her hands being as clean and white as they were the day she was buried." She was reinterred on the edge of Durphy Street (now Illinois Route 96).
