= Geoff Walker =

Geoff Walker may refer to:

- Geoff Walker (footballer) (1926–1997), English professional footballer
- Geoff Walker (canoeist) (1952–1997), New Zealand canoeist who competed at the 1980 Summer Olympics
- Geoff Walker (curler) (born 1985), Canadian curler
- Geoff Walker (ice hockey) (born 1987), Canadian ice hockey player

== See also ==
- Jeff Walker (disambiguation)
