= Willard Richards =

American religious leader

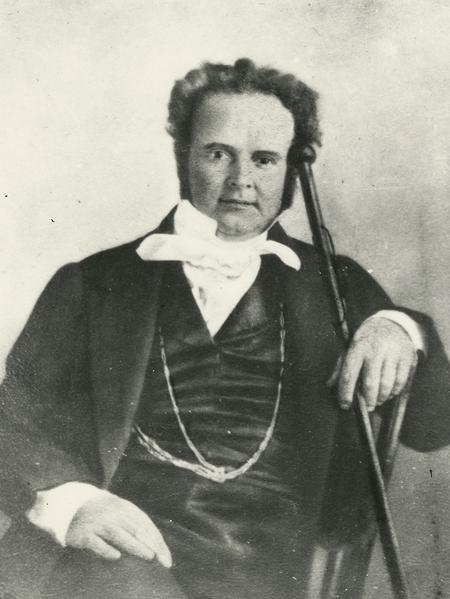

Second Counselor in the First Presidency
- December 27, 1847 – March 11, 1854
- Called by: Brigham Young
- Predecessor: William Law
- Successor: Jedediah M. Grant

Quorum of the Twelve Apostles
- April 14, 1840 – December 27, 1847
- Called by: Joseph Smith
- End reason: Called as Second Counselor in the First Presidency

LDS Church Apostle
- April 14, 1840 – March 11, 1854
- Called by: Joseph Smith
- Reason: Replenishing Quorum of the Twelve
- Reorganization at end of term: Jedediah M. Grant ordained and added to First Presidency

Personal details
- Born: June 24, 1804; Hopkinton, Massachusetts, United States
- Died: March 11, 1854 (aged 49); Salt Lake City, Utah Territory, United States
- Resting place: Salt Lake City Cemetery; 40.777°N 111.858°W
- Spouse(s): 14
- Parents: Joseph and Rhoda Howe Richards
- Signature

Willard Richards (June 24, 1804 – March 11, 1854) was an early leader in the Latter Day Saint movement. He served as second counselor to church president Brigham Young in the First Presidency of the Church of Jesus Christ of Latter-day Saints (LDS Church) from 1847 until his death.

== Early life ==
Willard Richards was born in Hopkinton, Massachusetts, to Joseph Richards and Rhoda Howe on June 24, 1804. He was the youngest of eleven children. At the age of four, he injured his head in a fall and was left with some residual muscle tremor and paralysis.

As a child, Richards was very inquisitive and would ask questions and read constantly. This was especially the case during the six months the local congregational minister resided in his parents' household. Because of his tendency to ask questions as to why things were the way they were, he was denied admission to the local congregational church.

As the injury limited his physical activity, he focused his attention on education and obtained a teacher's certificate at age sixteen. He taught school in Chatham, New York, and in Lanesborough, Massachusetts. In 1823, he moved to Naussau, New York.

Richards pursued additional studies in physical mechanics and science, and studied the clarinet. At age 27, he became an itinerant lecturer, traveling throughout New England giving lectures on various scientific subjects.

At the age of thirty, after the death of his sister Susan, Richards decided to become a medical doctor. He studied at the Thomson Infirmary in Boston, focusing on medication and herbal preparations. He then settled in Holliston, Massachusetts, where he practiced medicine.

In 1836, Richards was introduced to the newly published Book of Mormon by his cousins, Joseph and Brigham Young. Richards read the book twice within ten days and soon made preparations to move to Kirtland, Ohio, to join the Church of the Latter Day Saints; a bout of "palsy", however, prevented him from traveling until a year later. Richards was baptized on December 31, 1836, by Brigham Young and ordained an elder on March 6, 1837.

== Early church service ==
Shortly following his ordination as an elder, Richards was called on a brief three-month mission to the Eastern United States. Immediately upon his return, he was called on a more extended mission to Great Britain. This put him among the first missionaries of the LDS Church to go to Britain. Richards served a total of four years on his mission to Britain. He helped with the Millennial Star's publication.

With his high level of education, Richards was often counseled by Heber C. Kimball to focus on the basic tenets of the gospel. Richards was the moving force behind establishing the first branch of the church in Manchester, England. He was appointed first counselor to the president of the European Mission, Joseph Fielding.

== Marriage and family ==
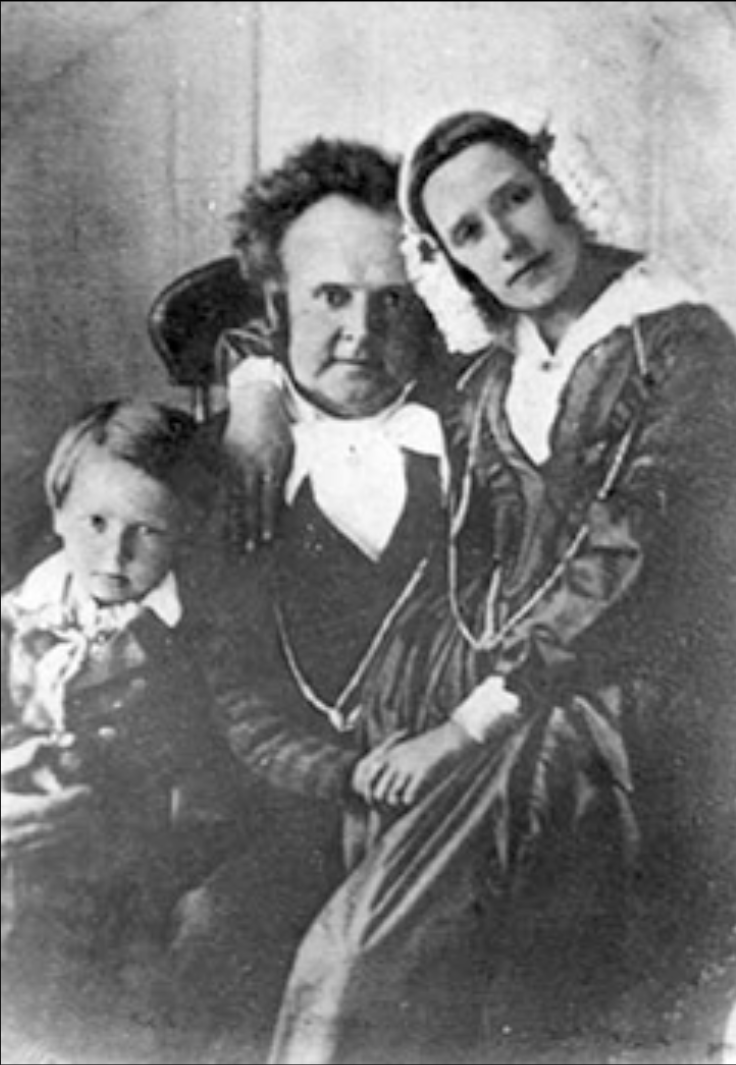
Willard Richards and his wife Jennetta and son Heber.

Richards married Jennetta Richards on September 24, 1838, while on a four-year mission to England. Their first child, named Heber John, was born on July 17, 1839, but died of smallpox just five months later in October. They had two surviving children, a son, also named Heber John, born in Manchester, England, in 1840, and a daughter, Rhoda Ann Jennetta, born in 1843 in Nauvoo, Illinois. Jennetta Richards was in poor health, and after traveling across the Atlantic Ocean in April 1841, Richards took her to live with his siblings in Richmond, Massachusetts, while he went on to Nauvoo, Illinois.

Richards was a close confidant of Joseph Smith, and became a practitioner of polygamy. There is indication that his first plural wife was 26-year-old Nancy Marinda Johnson Hyde, who was already married to Orson Hyde (Hyde was away on a mission at the time). Richards returned to Richmond and retrieved his wife Jennetta, arriving back in Nauvoo on November 21, 1842.

On January 18, 1843, Richards married sixteen-year-old Sarah Longstroth and fourteen-year-old Nanny Longstroth, who were sisters. Joseph Smith officiated the wedding. Richards married eleven wives in total.

Willard and Jennetta Richards were sealed on May 29, 1843, and were among the first couples to be sealed. After struggling with illness all her life, Jennetta died on July 9, 1845, at age twenty-seven.

== Apostle ==
Richards was ordained an apostle on April 14, 1840, by Brigham Young. In 1841, he moved to Nauvoo, Illinois, to be with the body of the church. He was in Warsaw, Illinois, from September to December and did not take up residence in Nauvoo until December 1841. He was in Warsaw on a missionary assignment to found and supervise a settlement of church members there.

Richards was a member of the Nauvoo City Council from 1841 to 1843. He also was a member of the Masonic lodge at Nauvoo. In 1843 he was made recorder of the Nauvoo Municipal Court.

He became Joseph Smith's private secretary in December 1841, when he was also made recorder of the Nauvoo Temple. In December 1842, Richards was called to be the Church Historian and Recorder, a position he held until his death. In these two capacities, Richards maintained Smith's schedule and recorded most of his activities. As church historian, he subsequently wrote a total of 1,884 pages on the history of Smith. This work was later incorporated into The History of the Church of Jesus Christ of Latter-day Saints, edited by B. H. Roberts.

In July 1842, Richards went on a short mission to New England. In 1844, Richards was made the recorder of the Council of 50.

On May 4, 1842, Richards was one of nine men to whom Smith presented the endowment.

Richards was incarcerated in Carthage Jail with Joseph Smith, Hyrum Smith, and John Taylor on June 27, 1844, when the jail was attacked by a mob and the Smiths were murdered. Taylor was shot four times and severely injured, but survived the attack. Richards was unhurt and so supervised the removal of the bodies of Taylor and the Smiths. Over a year prior to the attack, Joseph Smith had told Richards that "the time would come that the balls would fly around him like hail, and he should see his friends fall on the right and on the left, but that there should not be a hole in his garment." His first-hand account of the event was published in the Times and Seasons.

Richards, his cousin Brigham Young, and other church elders left Nauvoo in February 1846, spending the remainder of the year at Winter Quarters, Nebraska. This first group entered into the Salt Lake Valley on July 24, 1847. They then went back to Winter Quarters, arriving on August 21, 1847, to gather the families for the Mormon Exodus of 1848.

== First Presidency ==
Richards was called as Second Counselor to Brigham Young in the First Presidency on December 27, 1847, in Council Bluffs, Iowa. After moving to Utah, Richards was involved in establishing the Deseret News, serving as its first editor-in-chief.

In the provisional state of Deseret, Richards served as both secretary and president of the council. Once Utah was organized as a territory, he served as its secretary. He was also postmaster of Salt Lake City.

== Death and legacy ==
Richards died in Salt Lake City on March 11, 1854, and was buried at Salt Lake City Cemetery. He was 49 years old. He was described as "calm and even minded" despite his physical challenges.

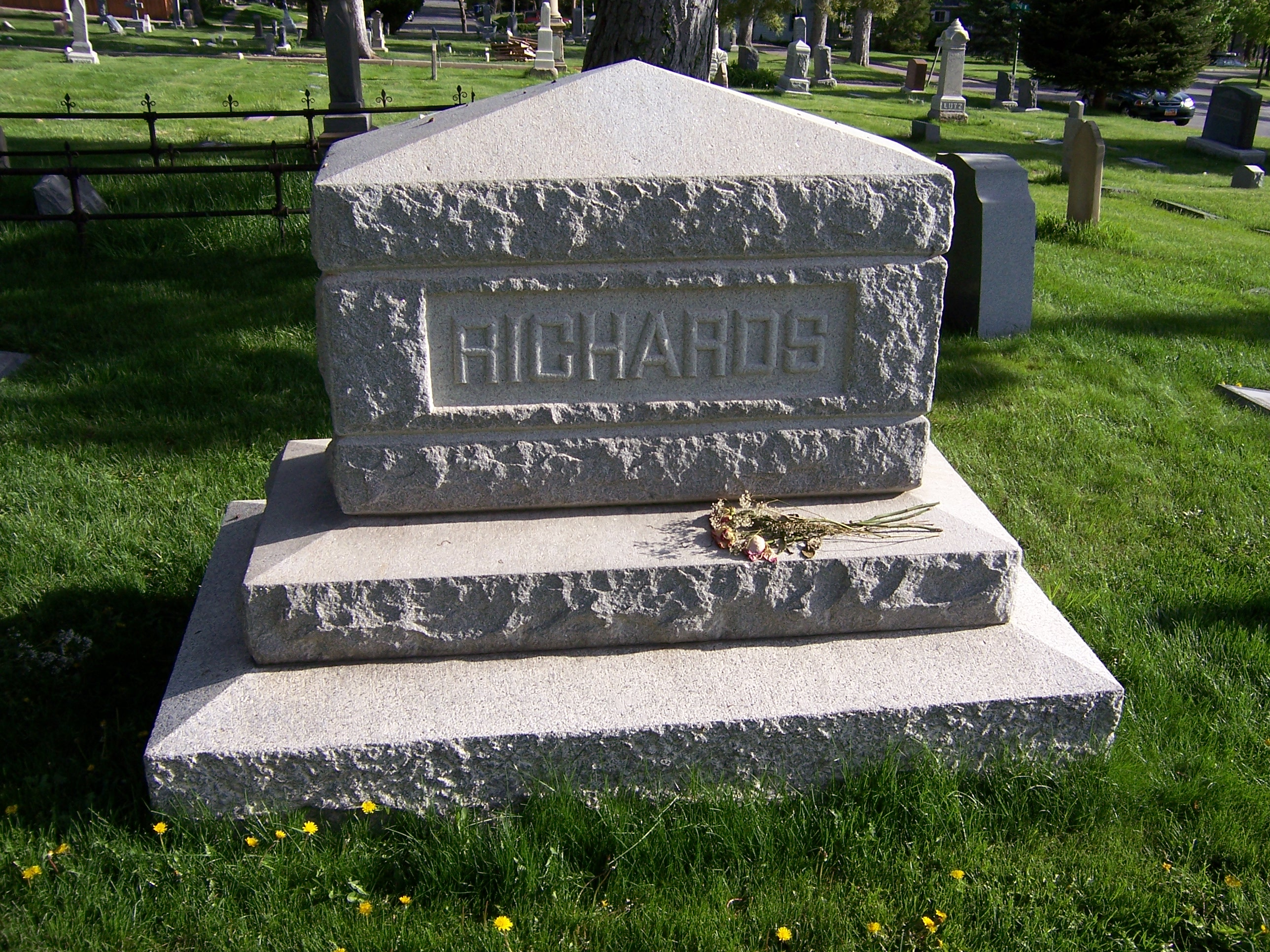
Willard Richards' grave marker

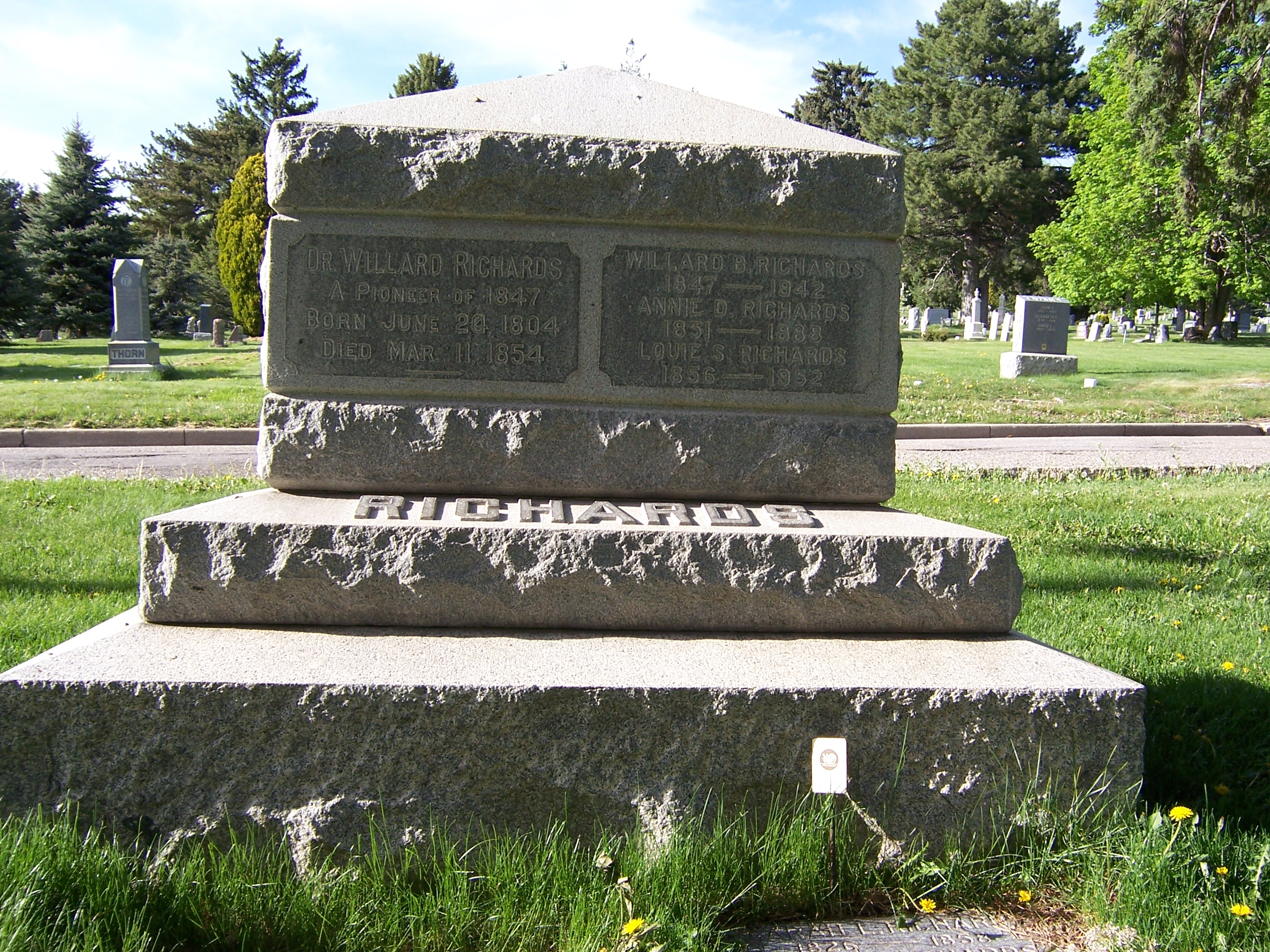
Back of Willard Richards' grave marker

== See also ==
- Phrenology and the Latter Day Saint Movement

== Notes ==
The Church of Jesus Christ of Latter-day Saints titles
Preceded by William Law	Second Counselor in the First Presidency; December 27, 1847 – March 11, 1854	Succeeded by Jedediah M. Grant
Church of Jesus Christ of Latter Day Saints titles Later renamed: The Church of Jesus Christ of Latter-day Saints (1844)
Preceded by William Smith	Quorum of the Twelve Apostles; April 14, 1840 – December 27, 1847	Succeeded by Lyman Wight
