= Messenger (magazine) =

Messenger of the fullness of the Gospel is a Mormon fundamentalist publication, originally printed in Birmingham, England, starting in 1991, which was in print in that country until 2001, and continues as a web-based publication. It went under the original title of Truth Seeker magazine, until it was found that there was an existing periodical that shared that name.

Although originally printed quarterly, it was printed bi-monthly when it moved to an American-produced edition in 2003.

It was edited by a former bishop of the Church of Jesus Christ of Latter-day Saints (LDS Church), along with a member who worked for the LDS Church. It is unique in being the only such Mormon fundamentalist magazine printed outside of the United States, and probably the only one edited and authored by active LDS Church members (although they were subsequently excommunicated for their beliefs). Their involvement in the magazine was possibly one of the factors that led to their excommunication from the LDS Church.

It first appeared online in 1994.

This magazine is not, nor does it claim to be, an official publication of the LDS Church.

== See also ==
- List of Latter Day Saint periodicals
