= Beehive Standard Weekly =

Conservative political and cultural news service

The Beehive Standard Weekly is a conservative political and cultural news service for members of the Church of Jesus Christ of Latter-day Saints (LDS Church) and for those curious about the Mormon culture.

== History ==
It originates from a newsletter called The Beehive, which began in 1975 as a 12-page circular in Las Vegas, Nevada, started by Charlene and Richard Taylor for a group of local women who attended the same congregation. At first, it covered only local religious events and activities. Circulation increased throughout the Las Vegas Valley, and in 1990 the Taylors' son Russell took over. In 1993, he used resources from Arizona's defunct Latter-day Sentinel publication to create a branch of the Beehive Newspaper referred to as the Arizona Beehive. The Nevada Beehive was still widely available for free at convenience and grocery stores, or by paid mail subscriptions, and expanded distribution throughout Utah in 1993. In 1994, readership was around 75,000 and the paper planned to debut the quarterly Beehive Singles News.

In 2002, the Nevada Beehive was acquired by Las Vegas-based attorney Rob Graham who continued the growth of the publication as well as its readership base by providing popular content for a more general audience. The Taylor family continued to print the Arizona Beehive in Mesa, Arizona, independent of the Nevada Beehive, expanding to 25,000 copies distributed by mail or at businesses owned by LDS members.

The Nevada Beehive became the Beehive Standard Weekly in 2005. In 2006, the organization shut down its hard copy newspaper to focus primarily on providing original online news content and political commentary.

== Coverage ==
The Beehive endorsed Mitt Romney and followed his campaign in 2007–2008, often defending Romney's religion and religious views from attacks. The organization was the first to suggest that Mormons might have been disaffected from the Republican Party by how Romney's religion was treated by Evangelical Christians from the southern states and how Mormons might swing towards supporting Barack Obama in the general election given his plea for civility and inclusion.

Though not authoritative, the Beehive does make commentary relating to Mormon doctrine and does explain the Mormon culture to non-Mormons. The Beehive also defends the Mormon faith from attacks by Anti-Mormons.

== See also ==
- List of Latter Day Saint periodicals
