= Fred Woods (historian) =

American Mormon historian

Fred Emmett Woods IV (born 1956) is an American academic, historian, author, and documentarian of the Latter Day Saint movement. He is a professor in the College of Religious Education at Brigham Young University.

== Early life ==
Woods was born in 1956 and grew up in Southern California. He is a convert to The Church of Jesus Christ of Latter-day Saints when he was a young adult.

Woods earned a B.S. in psychology in 1981 from Brigham Young University, followed by a Master of Science in international relations in 1985. In 1991, he received a Ph.D. in Middle East studies with an emphasis on Hebrew Biblical studies from the University of Utah. His doctoral dissertation was entitled Water and Storm Polemics against Baalism in the Deuteronomic History. Since that time, Woods has focused his studies primarily on 19th and 20th century Latter-day Saint history.

== Career ==
Woods was an instructor in the at Orem High Seminary in Orem, Utah, from 1981 to 1985. He was an Institute of Religion instructor at Fullerton JC in Fullerton, California from 1985 to 1986 and was the institute director at Harbor College in Wilmington, California from 1987 to 1988 and the University of Colorado Boulder from 1991 to 1993. From 1993 to 1998, he was a professor of religion at Ricks College. Since 1998, he has been a professor in the College of Religious Education at Brigham Young University, now called BYU Religious Education. He held the Richard L. Evans Chair of Religious Understanding at the College of Religion from 2005 to 2010. He held the Moral Education Professorship at Brigham Young University from 2019 to 2021.

== Awards ==
- Richard L. Anderson Distinguished Research Award from Religious Education (2002)
- BYU University Creative Works Award (2024)

== Personal life ==
Woods is married to JoAnna Merrill. They are the parents of five children.

== Select publications ==
Woods created Saints by Sea, a database that compiles passenger lists and first-person accounts of the Latter-day Saint passengers on ships from 1840 to 1890 that were traveling to America. Some of other publications include the following.

=== Books ===
- Fred E. Woods. Fire on Ice: The Story of Icelandic Latter-day Saints at Home and Abroad. Provo: Religious Studies Center, Brigham Young University, 2005. ISBN 0-8425-2617-X.
- Fred E. Woods. When the Saints Come Marching In: a History of Latter Day Saints in St Louis. Millennial Press Inc., 2009. ISBN 978-1932597653.
- Riley M. Moffat, Jeffrey N. Walker, Fred E. Woods, and Steven C. Walker. Gathering to La'ie. La'ie, Hawai'i: Jonathan Napela Center for Hawaiian and Pacific Island Studies, Brigham Young University, 2011. ISBN 9780939154104
- Riley M. Moffat and Fred E. Woods. "The Church of Jesus Christ of Latter-day Saints in the Islands of the Pacific" in The Palgrave Handbook of Global Mormonism. R. Gordon Shepherd, A. Gary Shepherd, Ryan T. Cragun, editors. London: Palgrave/MacMillan, 2020. pp. 431–454. ISBN 978-3030526153.
- Fred E. Woods. "A Mission to Washington: Orson Pratt’s Publishing of The Seer" in Latter-day Saints in Washington, D.C.: History, People, and Places. Kenneth L. Alford, Lloyd D. Newell, and Alexander L. Baugh, editors. Provo: Religious Studies Center, Brigham Young University/Deseret Book, 2021. pp. 67–84. ISBN 978-1-9503-0403-5.
- Fred E. Woods. "Introduction The Latter-day Saint Gathering" in Liverpool to Great Salt Lake: The 1851 Journal of Missionary George D. Watt. Ronald G. Watt and LaJean Carruth, editors. Lincoln: University of Nebraska Press, 2022. pp. xv-xxvi. ISBN 9781496229878.
- Malcolm Adcock, Fred E. Woods. The Latter-day Saint Image in the British Mind. Salt Lake City: Greg Kofford Books, 2022. ISBN 978-1589585584.
- Charles Vance, Mark Mendenhall, and Fred E. Woods. "Missionary Families: LDS Case Study". in Research Handbook of Global Families: Implications for Theory and Practice. Yvonne McNulty editor. Cheltenham: Edward Elgar Publishing, 2023. ISBN 978 1 78811 286 4.
- Malcolm Adcock and Fred E. Woods. Bright Lights in the Desert: The Latter-day Saints of Las Vegas. Reno: University of Nevada Press, 2023. ISBN 9781647790714.
- Fred E. Woods, Jay H. Buckley, and Hunter T. Hallows, eds. The Life and Adventures of Eli Wiggill: South African 1820 Settler, Wesleyan Missionary, and Latter-day Saint. Salt Lake City: Greg Kofford Books, 2024. ISBN 978-1-58958-804-2.
- Fred E. Woods. Ports to Posts: The Gathering of Latter-day Saints in the Nineteenth Century. Reno: University of Nebraska Press, 2025. ISBN 9781496230706.

=== Documentary films ===
- Fire & Redemption: The Explosion of the Steamboat Saluda (2004)
- That Promised Day: The Coming Forth of the LDS Scriptures (2010)
- Mormon Yankees: Giants on and off the Court (2011)
- Finding Refuge in El Paso (2012)
- Divine Providence: The Wreck and Rescue of the Julia Ann (2014)
- Laie: Refuge from the Storm (2015)
- Melting the Ice: A History of the Latter-day Saints in Alaska (2018)
- The Saints of Tonga: A Century of Island Faith (2019)
- The Latter-Day Saint Image in the British Mind (2021)
- Bright Lights in the Desert: The Latter-day Saints of Las Vegas (2022)
- A Swede and A Seed: The Ivar Sandberg Story (2023)
- Flood of Memories: The 1976 Teton Flood Disaster and Recovery (2024)
- Montana Saints (2025)
- Channeling Hope (2025)
- St. Louis: Oasis of Tolerance and Love (2025)
- Denver Latter-day Saints and Their Neighbors (2026)
- Kelsey Seeds to Texas Roots (2026)

=== Journal and magazine articles ===
- Fred E. Woods. "The Church in Iceland". LDS Living (January 25, 2016).
- Fred E. Woods. "'They Called It Hell, and We Called It Heaven': The Story of Exiled Saints in Kalaupapa Leprosy Settlement". LDS Living (February 27, 2017).
- Fred E. Woods. "Sacrament Over the Internet, Church in Sub-Zero Weather + Other Things You Didn't Know About Saints in Alaska". LDS Living (April 27, 2018).
- Fred E. Woods. "The Unbelievable True Story of Saints Shipwrecked on their Way to Zion". LDS Living (July 21, 2018).
- Fred E. Woods. "The Faith of the Scottish Saints + How the View of the Church Is Changing in Scotland". LDS Living (February 15, 2019).
- Fred E. Woods. "Uniting East and West: Latter-day Saints and the Transcontinental Railroad". LDS Living (May 10, 2019).
- Fred E. Woods. "Osmondmania: The Latter-day Saint Family Who Took the UK by Storm as 'Musical Missionaries'". LDS Living (November 17, 2019).
- Fred E. Woods. "Leavening the Sourdough: A History of Latter-day Saints in Kodiak". Latter-day Saint Historical Studies, vol. 21, no. 2 (Fall 2020): 55–78.
- Fred E. Woods. "The 'Crowning Jewel': Lesser-Known Stories Behind the Building of the Las Vegas Temple". LDS Living (November 11, 2020).
- Fred E. Woods. "The Balance Between Church and State in Tonga: A Study in Mutual Respect Between the Latter-day Saints and the Royal Family". Journal of Mormon History, vol. 46, no. 1 (Winter 2020): 53–84.
- Fred E. Woods. "Beneath the Pages: McClintock’s Mormon Settlement in Arizona". Latter-day Saint Historical Studies, vol. 22, no. 1 (Spring 2021): 115–155.
- Fred E. Woods and RIley M. Moffat. "The Genesis and Rise of the Nuku'alofa Tonga Temple". Mormon Historical Studies, vol. 21, no. 1 (Spring 2021): 91–114.
- Fred E. Woods. "The Rise of the Sitka Saints". Latter-day Saint Historical Studies, vol. 22, no. 1 (Spring 2021): 37–56.
- Fred E. Woods. "African American Baptists and Latter-day Saints in Las Vegas". Nevada Historical Society Quarterly, vol. 64, no. 3 (Fall 2021): 259–267.
- Fred E. Woods. "The Ascension of Abraham: A Mortal Model for the Climb to Exaltation". Religious Educator, vol. 23, no. 2 (Spring 2022): 47–63.
- Fred E. Woods. "St. Johns Saints and their Friendly Neighbors: Early Conflict to Community Cohesion". Latter-day Saint Historical Studies, vol. 23, no. 1 (Spring 2022): 183–204.
- Fred E. Woods. "'Our Mormon Neighbors Gave': Mancos Colorado Saints Intertwined with Community". Latter-day Saint Historical Studies, vol. 23, no. 1 (Spring 2022): 205–223.
- Fred E. Woods. "The Pluck and Luck of the Irish Saints: A Brief History of the Church in Ireland". LDS Living (March 16, 2022)
- Sean E. Brotherson and Fred E. Woods. "Each One was Going to Put the Hand to the Plow and Sow the Precious Gospel Seed: Early Latter-day Saint Missionary Work in North Dakota". Great Plains Quarterly, vol. 42, no. 4 (Summer 2022): 275–303.
- Fred E. Woods. "After Accidentally Causing his Friend’s Death, this Swede Found Peace through the Gospel in the US". LDS Living (August 10, 2022).
- Fred E. Woods. "Bright Lights in the Desert: How Latter-day Saints Have Shaped Las Vegas Culture, Community, and Politics". LDS Living (March 2, 2023March 02, 2023).
- Mason J. Cameron and Fred E. Woods. "Ping’s Inspired Dream: How an Unlikely Friend Helped open the Philippines for Missionary Work". LDS Living (May 18, 2023).
- Fred E. Woods. "A Seed and a Swede: The Ivar Sandberg Story". South Dakota History, vol. 53, no. 2 (Summer 2023): 127–155
- Fred E. Woods. "Century Gathering of Latter-day Saints". Pioneer, vol. 69, no.2 (2023): 3–9.
- Fred E. Woods and Cheryl Jensen. "Picketing Against Porn in Mesquite: Community Values vs. a 'Vice' Enterprise". Nevada Historical Society Quarterly (December 2023)
- Fred E. Woods. "Cassia County Community Unity: Reflections on the Flood Prevention Fight of 1984". Latter-day Saint Historical Studies, vol. 25, nos. 1–2, (Spring and Fall 2024): 225–246.
