= Jeffrey N. Walker =

American attorney and academic

- Born: October 24, 1960 (age 65); Salt Lake City, Utah, U.S.

Academic background
- Education: Western Michigan University (BS); Brigham Young University (JD)

Academic work
- Discipline: Law; History
- Sub-discipline: Mormon history Mormon jurisprudence
- Institutions: J. Reuben Clark Law School

Jeffrey N. Walker (born October 24, 1960) is an American attorney and academic working as an adjunct professor at the J. Reuben Clark Law School (BYU).

== Early life and education ==
Walker was born in Salt Lake City and raised in Kalamazoo, Michigan. He served an LDS mission in the Canada Montreal Mission. He received his Bachelor of Science degree in political science from Western Michigan University and a Juris Doctor from the J. Reuben Clark Law School at Brigham Young University (BYU). While at BYU, he served as an articles editor of the Brigham Young University Law Review.

== Career ==
After law school, Walker practiced at Pillsbury Winthrop Shaw Pittman in Los Angeles before moving to Salt Lake City, where he joined Jones Waldo, Holbrook & McDonough. Walker left Jones Waldo to become general counsel for a regional healthcare company prior to forming the law firm Holman & Walker. Holman and Walker were among the attorneys for the defense when the Foundation for Apologetic Information and Research was sued for alleged copyright infringement by Utah Lighthouse Ministries, Inc. In 2017, Walker formed a law firm, Walker Law Group, with his sons.

Walker was an owner and president of Western Architectural Services in Draper, Utah, a thematic manufacturing company (see www.western-architectural.com). He also was one of the founders of a national watch company, Precision Time (formerly Batteries & Bands).

From 2004 to 2017, Walker was involved with the Joseph Smith Papers Project of The Church of Jesus Christ of Latter-day Saints, including as the Legal and Business Series Editor and Manager, the associate managing editor, and as a senior advisor. He has spoken widely on early Mormonism, including at BYU Education Week, the John Whitmer Historical Association, and the Mormon History Association.

In 2012, Walker was asked by The Church of Jesus Christ of Latter-day Saints to participate with the Illinois Supreme Court Historic Preservation Commission and the Abraham Lincoln Presidential Library and Museum in developing a year-long program on the Mormon involvement in the Illinois judicial system during the 1840s. This assignment led to Walker writing a script to re-create Joseph Smith's three extradition hearings.

Walker co-edited Sustaining the Law: Joseph Smith Legal Encounters (2014, BYU Studies, Brigham Young University) with John W. Welch and Gordon A. Madsen. Walker co-authored Gathering to La'ie with Riley Moore Moffat and Fred E. Woods. He has managed to recover the tune of "A Poor Wayfaring Man of Grief" used by John Taylor at Carthage Jail. He was also involved in uncovering documents that more clearly showed George M. Hinkle as a traitor to the interests of the Latter-day Saints.

Walker taught at the College of Religion, Church History and Doctrine at Brigham Young University for six years. He has been an adjunct professor at the J. Reuben Clark Law School (BUY) for more than fifteen years.

Walker is on the executive board and the treasurer of the Mormon Historic Sites Foundation and the managing editor of the foundation's journal, Mormon Historical Studies. Walker is also the chairman of the board of trustees for the Brigham Young Center Foundation.

His contributions to the understanding of Mormon jurisprudence were acknowledged in John W. Welch's article "Toward a Mormon Jurisprudence". Walker's article "The Trials of Christ: The Silent Defense" was published by Biblicaltheology.com.

== Personal life ==
Walker and his wife, the former Elizabeth Hepburn, are the parents of four children and 11 grandchildren.
