= Warren A. Cowdery =

Early Latter Day Saint leader (1788–1851)

Warren A. Cowdery (October 17, 1788 – February 23, 1851) was an American religious leader. He was an early leader in the Latter Day Saint movement and an editor of Latter Day Saints' Messenger and Advocate, an early Latter Day Saint periodical. He was the eldest brother of Oliver Cowdery, who with Joseph Smith was a primary initiator of the Latter Day Saint movement.

== Early life ==
Cowdery was born on October 17, 1788, in Poultney, Vermont. By 1812, he was studying to become a medical doctor in Rutland County, Vermont. On September 22, 1814, he married Patience Simonds, and in 1816 the couple moved to Freedom, New York. In 1818 Cowdery, became a commissioner of Ontario County, New York, and by 1820 he had moved to Le Roy, New York. He worked as an apothecary and later as postmaster for Freedom, New York.

== Latter Day Saint and controversy ==
In 1834, largely as a result of his brother Oliver's influence, Warren Cowdery became a member of The Church of Jesus Christ of Latter Day Saints. On November 25, 1834, Joseph Smith received a revelation that specified that Warren Cowdery should be appointed the presiding High Priest of the Church “in the land of Freedom and the regions round about.”

In 1835, Cowdery reported to church headquarters in Kirtland, Ohio, that the members of the Quorum of the Twelve had been neglecting their fund-raising activities for the Kirtland Temple while serving as church missionaries. The leadership of the church believed Cowdery's report and issued a letter chastising the Twelve. In January 1836, the members of the Twelve rejected Cowdery's accusation and accused him of using language that is "unchristian and unbecoming any man". After Cowdery moved to Kirtland in February 1836, he had an apology to the Twelve published in the church periodical Messenger and Advocate, stating that he "most deeply regrets" his comments which were made mistakenly but "innocently".

He was appointed a member of the Kirtland High Council of the church in May 1837.

== Editor and scribe ==
In March 1836, Oliver Cowdery became the editor of the Messenger and Advocate. However, Oliver gave Warren much of the day-to-day responsibilities of this position because Oliver was the Assistant President of the Church and was busy with many other responsibilities.

Cowdery was the church's official Scribe and Assistant Recorder from 1836 to 1837. On March 27, 1836, he served with Warren Parrish as the scribe at the dedicatory services for the Kirtland Temple. On February 1, 1837, Oliver sold his printing press to Joseph Smith and Sidney Rigdon, and Cowdery was officially made the editor of Messenger and Advocate.

== Apostasy and estrangement from the church ==
In 1837, as many Latter Day Saints in Kirtland began to lose money in Joseph Smith's Kirtland Safety Society, Cowdery's editorials began to be critical of Smith's leadership. In 1838, Cowdery was elected justice of the peace of Kirtland, and the majority of Latter Day Saints loyal to Smith began to relocate to Missouri.

In the August 1838 edition of Elders' Journal, the new official church publication, an unattributed article severely criticized Cowdery, Warren Parrish, and other dissenters who had left the church in Kirtland; Cowdery was attacked in the following terms:

This poor pitiful beggar came to Kirtland a few years since with a large family, nearly naked and destitute. It was really painful to see this pious doctor's (for such he professed to be) rags flying when he walked the streets. He was taken in by us in this pitiful condition and we put him into the printing office and gave him enormous wages, not because he could earn it, or because we needed his service, but merely out of pity. We knew the man's incompetency all the time and his ignorance and inability to fill any place in the literary world with credit to himself or to his employers. But notwithstanding all this, out of pure compassion, we gave him a place and afterwards hired him to edit the paper in that place and gave him double as much as he could have gotten anywhere else. The subscribers, many at least, complained to us of his inability to edit the paper and there was much dissatisfaction about it, but still we retained him in our employ, merely that he might not have to be supported as a pauper.

By our means, he got himself and family decently clothed and got supplied with all the comforts of life, and it was nothing more nor less than supporting himself and family as paupers, for his services were actually not worth one cent to us, but on the contrary, was an injury. The owners of the establishment could have done all the work which he did themselves, just as well without him as with him. In reality, it was a piece of pauperism.

But now, reader, mark the sequel. It is a fact of public notoriety that as soon as he found himself and family in possession of decent apparel, he began to use all his influence to our injury, both in his savings and doings. We have often heard it remarked by slave holders that you should not make a negro equal with you or he would try to walk over you. We have found the saying verified in this pious doctor, for truly this niggardly spirit manifested itself in all its meanness. Even in his writings (and they were very mean at best) he threw out foul insinuations, which no man who had one particle of noble feeling would have condescended to. But such was the conduct of this master of meanness.

== Later life ==
Cowdery was involved with Warren Parrish in the formation of a rival Latter Day Saint sect in Kirtland, which they named the "Church of Christ". While the church briefly gained ownership of the Kirtland Temple, internal division led to the dissolution of the church after only a few months of existence. Cowdery lived the rest of his life in Kirtland and never became involved with any other Latter Day Saint group. He and his wife were the parents of eleven children: seven sons and four daughters.
