= Benjamin Winchester =

Leader in the LDS church (1817–1901)

Benjamin Winchester (August 6, 1817 – January 25, 1901) was an early leader in the Latter Day Saint movement. Winchester was the youngest adult member of Zion's Camp, an original member of the first Quorum of the Seventy, editor of the first independent Mormon periodical, the Gospel Reflector, president of a large branch of the church in Philadelphia, a zealous missionary who baptized thousands, a Rigdonite Apostle, and ultimately a dissenter who repudiated Mormonism altogether.

The Gospel Reflector was published in Philadelphia, twice a month, between January 1, 1841, and June 15, 1841. Winchester moved to Nauvoo, Illinois, in October 1841 where he worked at the Times and Seasons until January 1842.

Winchester also wrote pamphlets and two significant books on Latter Day Saint topics. His Synopsis of the Holy Scriptures, and Concordance, published in 1842, was the first categorization of Bible scriptures from a Mormon perspective and included a detailed analysis of the Christian apostasy. His A Brief History of the Priesthood from the Beginning of the World to the Present Time, published in 1843, was the first book to focus on the topic of the Mormon priesthood.
