= Jeffrey Walker (chief executive) =

American chief executive

Jeffrey C. Walker worked from 1984 to 2005 as CEO and co-founder of CCMP Capital, and JPMorgan Partners, JPMorgan Chase & Co's global private equity, vice chairman of JPMorgan Chase & Co. and chairman of the JPMorgan Chase Foundation. He has subsequently been active in many non-profit and education areas, including Harvard University. He is known as a positive advocate for meditation, yoga and related practices. He graduated from University of Virginia and Harvard Business School.
