= Gladden Bishop =

American Mormon leader (1809–1864)

Founder of the Church of Jesus Christ of Latter Day Saints (Gladdenite)
- 1851 – November 30, 1854

Personal details
- Born: Francis Gladden Bishop; January 19, 1809; Livonia, New York, United States
- Died: November 30, 1864 (aged 55); Salt Lake City, Utah, United States
- Parents: Isaac Gates Bishop; Mary Hyde

Francis Gladden Bishop (January 19, 1809 – November 30, 1864) was a minor leader in the Latter Day Saint movement after the 1844 succession crisis. Bishop claimed to be the rightful successor to Joseph Smith; from the 1850s until his death, Bishop led a succession of small groups of Latter Day Saints and converts. His followings have been identified informally by later writers as the Gladdenites and the Church of Jesus Christ of Latter Day Saints (Gladdenite), though the name of a late following is formally The Church of Jesus Christ of the New Jerusalem. In the 1850s, many of Bishop's followers abandoned him and joined the movement that would later become the Church of Christ (Temple Lot).

== Early life ==
Bishop was born in Livonia, Livingston County, New York, the third of nine children born to devout Methodists Isaac Gates Bishop and Mary Hyde. According to some reports, Mary Hyde Bishop "was a religious enthusiast and previous to [Gladden's] birth had predicted that she would bear a son who would some day gladden the hearts of the people and would be the flying roll which Zacharias [sic] saw with his prophetic eye" (see Zechariah 5:1–4).

Other than serving as a missionary, Bishop's adult occupation is unknown. He was identified in various contemporary documents as a silversmith and as a pocket watch repairer.

== Latter Day Saint ==
In July 1832, Bishop was baptized by Latter Day Saint missionaries at Olean, New York and became a member of the Church of Christ, which had been founded two years earlier by Joseph Smith. Bishop also became an elder of the church and for a brief period of time in 1833 was president of the congregation of Latter Day Saints at Westfield, New York. At some point Bishop was also ordained to the priesthood office of seventy. In 1838 and 1839 Bishop was a missionary for the church in North Carolina, Virginia (including present-day West Virginia), Maryland, New York, Massachusetts, and Upper Canada. During his mission, Bishop published a short history of the Church of Jesus Christ of Latter Day Saints.

== Apostasies ==
On August 7, 1835, Bishop was disfellowshipped from the church by a high council of the church at Bradford, Massachusetts because "it was proved that he had erred in spirit and in doctrine, and was considerably inclined to enthusiasm, and much lifted up". On September 28, the Presiding High Council at Kirtland, Ohio reinstated Bishop and warned him against "advancing heretical doctrines which were derogatory to the character of the Church of the Latter Day Saints".

However, one contemporary commentator stated that "Gladden gave Joseph [Smith] much trouble; was cut off from the church and taken back and rebaptized nine times".

== Prophet and sect leader ==
=== Final apostasy and becoming a prophet ===
Well before the death of Joseph Smith in 1844, Bishop began to inform others that he had been chosen by God as Smith's rightful successor. In 1842, Bishop was excommunicated for heresy. Bishop claimed that although Smith had originally been chosen by God, he had become a "fallen prophet" due to his immorality and other sins. At the church trial that led to Bishop's final excommunication, Smith commented that Bishop "was a fool and had not sens [sic] sufficient for the Holy Ghost to enlighten him." Bishop asserted that Smith had been given the Aaronic priesthood by an angel, but his sinfulness prevented his reception of the Melchizedek priesthood. Bishop claimed that he himself had been given the Melchizedek priesthood by Jesus Christ, and that a man called "Nephi"—who Bishop said was one of the Three Nephites from the Book of Mormon—had visited him and delivered seven "sacred things" or objects, the first six of which had once been in the possession of Smith. The seven items Bishop claimed to be in possession of were:

1. the golden plates from which Smith translated the Book of Mormon;
2. the Urim and Thummim, which assisted Smith in translation;
3. the breastplate of Moroni;
4. the Liahona, an artifact from the Book of Mormon;
5. the sword of Laban;
6. a small silver "Crown of Israel" representing the Aaronic priesthood; and
7. a larger gold "Crown of Glory" representing the Melchizedek priesthood.

Bishop also claimed to have in his possession the first 116 pages of English manuscript of the Book of Mormon which had been translated by Joseph Smith but lost by Martin Harris.

Seven days after receiving these items, Bishop claimed that he was washed, anointed, robed and in vision placed upon a throne; according to one commentator, "to Bishop, this completed his calling, as upon him was conferred divine authority and kingship." Following this event, Bishop claimed that he was "David", "the king that shall reign over the united nation of Israel".

A few families in Illinois and Iowa believed that Bishop was a new prophet; other Latter Day Saints called these followers of Bishop Gladdenites. During this period of time, Bishop's leadership attracted the devotion of Martin Harris, one of the Three Witnesses to the Book of Mormon and a one-time apostle of the church. In 1851, Bishop and his followers moved to Kirtland, Ohio, which had been a headquarters of the church in the 1830s. One of Bishop's goals in returning to Kirtland was to acquire ownership of the Kirtland Temple, which the church was forced to abandon and had been unable to sell. On April 8, following a meeting of his followers in the temple, Bishop received a revelation which stated:

"Thus saith the Lord, even Jesus Christ, the everlasting Father—He who was, and is, and is to come—the first and the last: Behold I have again commenced a work on the earth, even that spoken of in the Book of Mormon, when I would bring forth the greater things to those who receive the Book of Mormon.

"And therefore have I again sent mine Holy Angels even as to Joseph [Smith] at the first and put into the hands of my servant Gladden the same sacred things which I put into the hands of my servant Joseph; and also other sacred things which have been hid up, to come forth when I should set up my Kingdom on the earth.

"And therefore that my word might be fulfilled, and also that my people might believe, have I caused that my servant Gladden should call Witnesses of these things; even he, who was one of the three Witnesses to the Book of Mormon, (viz: my servant Martin [Harris], and also my daughter Phebe [Bishop's wife], whom I have called these many years that she might be a witness in this, my great and glorious work, which I have now begun, and which shall never be overthrown;) and behold! my Witnesses have borne their testimony before my people in this place, yea, and in my house, even that which my people have built and dedicated unto me in Kirtland."

However, the Gladdenites were unable to gain legal possession of the Kirtland Temple. Several other attempts at collecting and holding a following proved ineffective as well.

=== Attempted move to Utah ===
In 1852, the leaders of the Latter Day Saints who had followed Brigham Young announced that the Church of Jesus Christ of Latter-day Saints were teaching and practising plural marriage in Utah Territory. Shortly thereafter, Bishop received a revelation from God that his followers should go to Utah, where the Gladdenites would wrest control of the LDS Church from Young by leading an uprising of the members of the LDS Church against polygamy. Bishop himself did not make the overland trip.

Several of Bishop's followers in Utah began preaching in the streets of Salt Lake City in March 1853. On March 20, from a wagon in front of the Old Tabernacle, several believers noisily accosted residents as they left church meetings. When several men attempted to push or pull the wagon out of the area, the city marshal dispersed the crowd. A week later another meeting was prohibited entirely by city officials. Alfred Smith, a member of the LDS Church who defected to the Gladdenites and had accused Young of robbing him of his property, was arrested and imprisoned until he gave a promise to Young to discontinue his rebellion.

On March 27, Young made the subject of the Gladdenites the focus of his Sunday sermon in the Salt Lake Tabernacle. In his sermon, Young stated:

"We want [apostates of the church] to go to California, or anywhere they choose. I say to those persons, you must not court persecution here, lest you get so much of it you will not know what to do with it. Do NOT court persecution. We have known Gladden Bishop for more than twenty years, and know him to be a poor, dirty curse. ... I say again, you Gladdenites, do not court persecution, or you will get more than you want, and it will come quicker than you want it. I say to you Bishops, do not allow them to preach in your wards. Who broke the roads to these valleys? Did this little nasty [Alfred] Smith, and his wife? No they staid in St. Louis while we did it, peddling ribbons, and kissing the Gentiles. I know what they have done here—they have asked exorbitant prices for their nasty stinking ribbons. [Voices, 'that's true.'] We broke the roads to this country. Now, you Gladdenites, keep your tongues still, lest sudden destruction come upon you. ...

"I say, rather than that apostates should flourish here, I will unsheath my bowie knife, and conquer or die. [Great commotion in the congregation, and a simultaneous burst of feeling, assenting to the declaration.] Now, you nasty apostates, clear out, or judgment will be put to the line, and righteousness to the plummet. [Voices, generally, 'go it, go it.'] If you say it is right, raise your hands. [All hands up.] Let us call upon the Lord to assist us in this, and every good work."

Later polemicists suggested that Young's comments are to be viewed in the context of his belief in the doctrine that apostates must be killed in order to pay for their sin. Both scholars and Latter Day Saint apologists have pointed out that none of the Gladdenites were actually killed by Young or members of the LDS Church, that Young's invective-filled speech was largely meant as a rhetorical message to the Gladdenites that the LDS Church did not want them remaining in Utah, and that within two weeks Young in fact backed down from his heated rhetoric.

Following Young's fiery speech, Apostle Parley P. Pratt delivered a similar sermon in which he attempted to destroy Bishop's credibility:

"Why is it that these apostates wish to cram down people's stomachs that which they loathe? That which they have no wish either to hear, think about, or digest? ... Where is the need, then, of preaching in the streets. But where is the city or community to be found, who wish to discuss that which they already know and understand? As to this man, or rather ' thing,' called Gladden Bishop, and his pretended visions and revelations, I know him of old. I knew him in Ohio, some eighteen or twenty years ago. I remember his name. ... I scarcely ever heard that name in my life, that it was not associated with some imposition or falsehood in the name of the Lord. If he was tried before the Councils of the Church, he would confess that he had lied, in pretending to visions, angels, and revelations, and ask forgiveness. If he was excommunicated, he would join again, &c.

"I never heard of him in any other light, but as a man or a ' thing ' that crept in from time to time among the Saints, with attempts to deceive the people with one imposition or another.

"His difficulty all the time was, that the people would not be deceived by him. I will not put him on a level with other apostates. Where can we find one of them that has not had some influence? I know of no one that had not some followers for awhile, although none could keep them; but I never knew Gladden Bishop to gain a single follower among his personal acquaintance. He was disfellowshipped, and received on his professions of repentance, so often, that the church at length refused to admit him any more as a member. . . .

"I see no ground, then, to prove or to investigate the calling of an apostate, who has always been trying to impose upon this people. It is too late in the day for us to stop to inquire whether such an outcast has the truth. . . .

"And yet we are called upon to prove—what? Whether an egg that was known to be rotten fifteen years ago, has really improved by reason of age!!"

On April 17, 1853, Brigham Young clarified his previous sermon dealing with the Gladdenites, curbing his hyperbole and emphasizing the Saints were to leave the Gladdenites alone:

"I wish to say a few words about some men and families in this city, called Gladdenites. We have been pretty severe upon them, but nowhere, except in the pulpit, to my knowledge. I counsel my brethren to keep away from their houses; let them alone, and treat them as courteously as you would any other person. Do you enquire whether I have any grounds for giving this advice? I answer, I have. For there are few men in this congregation who know when to stop, should they find themselves engaged in a contest with one of that class of people, therefore let them alone entirely. Those individuals are disagreeable to me, and so are their doctrines. The man they hold up is so low and degraded in his spirit, feelings, and life, I have not patience to hear anything said about him. I have known him too long, and too well, not to be satisfied of the wickedness of his heart. ...

"I wish this community to understand, that what has been said here touching those men and their views has been with no other design than to cause them to use their tongues as they ought, and cease abusing me and this people. Some of them visited me yesterday, and wished to know if it was safe for them to stay here. I told them they were as safe as I was, if they did not undertake to make us swallow, whether or not, something we are not willing to take. "We have been driven, and re-driven," said I, "and if corrupt people stay in our midst, they have got to use their tongues properly." They promised they would, if they might stay.

"If they wish to live here in peace, I am willing they should, but I do not wish them to stir up strife. I never expected that this community would be composed entirely of Latter-day Saints, but I expected there would be goats mixed among the sheep, until they are separated. I do not look for anything else, but I wish them to behave themselves in their sphere, also the sheep; and let the goats associate with their goatish companions, and not endeavor to disturb the equanimity of the sheep in their pasture.

"This comparison will apply to this people, and those men. If they wish to labor, and obtain a living, they are welcome to do so; but they are not at liberty to disturb the peace of their neighbors in any way; neither let this people disturb them, but grant them every privilege claimed by, and belonging to, American citizens. Let them meet together and pray if they please; this is their own business. Let them do as some did in a camp meeting in York State-One man met another and said, "How do you do? How are they getting along on the camp-ground?" "Why they are serving God like the very devil," was the reply. And the Gladdenites may serve God like the devil, if they will keep out of my way, and out of the way of this people."

=== Moves to Illinois and Iowa ===
By 1854, most of the Gladdenites had left Utah. Bishop and several dozen of his followers returned to Illinois and settled in Crow Creek, Illinois. There Bishop continued to claim that he was the leader of the church, which he now called The Church of Jesus Christ of the New Jerusalem. Granville Hedrick was said to be a follower of Bishop, but no direct evidence has been found to confirm. However, when several of the surrounding settlements of unaffiliated Latter Day Saints began meeting together under the direction of John E. Page, Bishop and some of his followers abandoned Crow Creek and moved to Kanesville, Iowa. Some of the Gladdenites, including Hedrick, remained in Illinois and became affiliated with the church organized by Page and Hedrick in 1863, which later became known as the Church of Christ (Temple Lot).

During his time in Iowa, Bishop attempted to publish a periodical for his organization entitled Zion's Messenger, which seems to have had only one issue.

=== Moves to Nebraska and Utah ===
By about 1860, Bishop and his followers had settled near Oconee in Platte County, Nebraska, where Bishop continued to head what he called the Church of Jesus Christ of Latter Day Saints. The Gladdenites were active in attempting to convert settlers and Native Americans in the area, with little success.

Around 1863, "unsavory reports in regard to the orgies which were a part of their Sunday exercises in the windowless church came to the ears of the outside world and created such discussion that their condition became unpleasant to them and their presence obnoxious to the settlers." The members of the Gladdenite church dispersed, with Bishop and a number of his followers travelling to Colorado.

In June or July 1864, Bishop travelled to Salt Lake City with the intention of meeting with Brigham Young, allowing the Mormons access to the seven sacred objects he claimed to hold, and ushering in the reign of the Ancient of Days. He lived quietly in Salt Lake City with his sister for several months and died there during a scarlet fever outbreak in late November 1864. He was to be buried in his sister's family plot but was interred in the wrong grave.

After Bishop's death, the Gladdenite church disintegrated. The "sacred things" were not found among his personal possessions.

== Publications ==
- Francis Gladden Bishop, A Brief History of the Church, Salem, [N.C.]: Blum and Son, 1839.
- ——, An Address to the Sons and Daughters of Zion, Scattered Abroad, Through all the Earth, Kirtland, Ohio: F.G. Bishop, 1851.

=== Zion's Messenger ===
Zion's Messenger was a periodical written and edited by Gladden Bishop and published in Council Bluffs, Iowa. The only recorded issue appeared in 1854.
