= Geoff Walker (footballer) =

English footballer

Personal information
- Full name: Robert Geoffrey Walker
- Date of birth: 29 September 1926
- Place of birth: Bradford, England
- Date of death: 13 March 1997 (aged 70)
- Place of death: Chelmsford, Essex
- Position: Left winger

Youth career
- 1943–1946: Bradford Park Avenue

Senior career*
Years	Team	Apps	(Gls)
1946–1954	Middlesbrough	240	(50)
1954–1957	Doncaster Rovers	77	(10)
1957–1958	Bradford City	2	(0)
- Chelmsford City
- Clacton Town
Total		319	(60)
- * Club domestic league appearances and goals

Robert Geoffrey Walker (29 September 1926 – 13 March 1997) was an English professional footballer who played as a left winger.

== Career ==
Born in Bradford, Walker played for Bradford Park Avenue, Middlesbrough, Doncaster Rovers, Bradford City, Chelmsford City and Clacton Town.
