= Jeffrey Walker (cricketer) =

Australian cricketer (born 1960)

Personal information
- Full name: Jeffrey Milton Walker
- Born: 11 September 1960 (age 65); Queensland, Australia
- Batting: Right-handed

Domestic team information
- Years: Team
- 1988/89: Queensland
- Source: ESPNcricinfo, 17 December 2015

Jeffrey Milton Walker (born 11 September 1960) is a former Australian cricketer. He was a right-handed batsman. He played two first-class cricket matches for Queensland during the 1988–89 season, scoring 87 runs.
