= LDS Living =

Mormon magazine

- Editor: Jake Frandsen
- Frequency: Bi-monthly
- Publisher: Deseret Book Company
- First issue: 1999; 26 years ago
- Country: United States
- Language: English
- Website: LDS Living

LDS Living is a bi-monthly magazine published by the Church of Jesus Christ of Latter-day Saints (LDS Church). It is published through the church's Deseret Book Company in Salt Lake City, Utah.

== See also ==
- List of Latter Day Saint periodicals
