= Jennetta Richards =

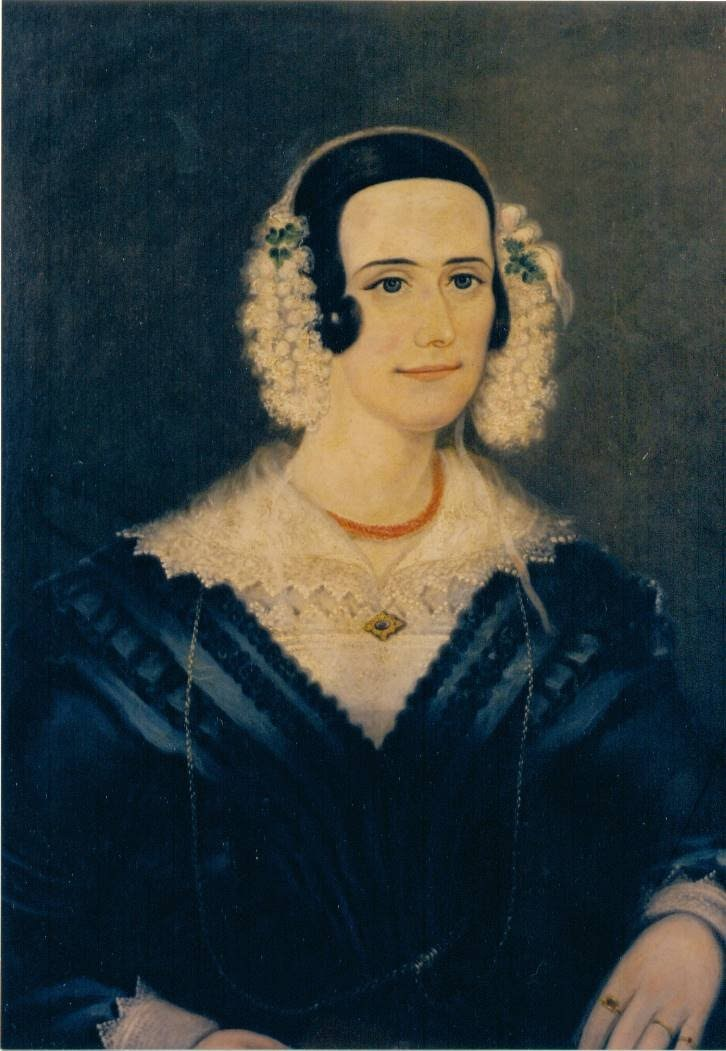
- Born: August 21, 1817; Walker Fold, Lancashire, England
- Died: July 9, 1845 (aged 27); Nauvoo, Illinois, U.S.
- Known for: First Latter Day Saint confirmed in England
- Spouse: Willard Richards (m. 1838–1845)

Jennetta Richards (August 21, 1817 – July 9, 1845) was a prominent early member of the Church of Jesus Christ of Latter Day Saints. She was one of the first members of the Latter Day Saint church to be baptized and the first member to be confirmed in England. Jennetta Richards was also one of the first women in the Latter Day Saint movement to receive a temple endowment and sealing. She was the wife of Willard Richards, a member of the First Presidency.

== Early life ==
Jennetta Richards was born on August 21, 1817. She was born in Walker Fold, Lancashire, England to Reverend John Richards and Ellen Charnock. Jennetta was the youngest of eight children born to the Richards family. Before her marriage to Willard Richards, she taught at the school within her father's independent church in Walker Fold.

== Conversion to the Church of Jesus Christ of Latter Day Saints ==
In August of 1837, Jennetta Richards visited her friends Ann and Thomas Walmsley living in nearby Preston. During her visit, the Walmsleys shared their recent experiences with Heber C. Kimball, a Latter Day Saint missionary. Ann Walmsley had been frail due to a chronic illness. Kimball promised Anne Walmsley that she would be healed if she was baptized into the church. After her baptism, Walmsley’s health began to improve gradually.

After hearing the story of Walmsley's recovery, Richards met Kimball at the Walmsleys' home and went back the following day to hear his message. On the third day of her visit, August 4, 1837, she was baptized into the Church of Jesus Christ of Latter Day Saints by Kimball in the River Ribble. She was then confirmed on the water's edge by him. Although not the first person to be baptized into the Latter Day Saint faith in England, she was the first person to be confirmed.

When Richards returned home from her trip in Preston, she informed her parents of her baptism. Her father wrote to Heber Kimball and invited him to use his chapel in Walker Fold. During this early time period of the church, it was common for the missionaries to utilize the buildings of other congregations. In Kimball’s first week in Walker Fold, he taught and baptized six people. However, as John Richards began to see how many people were being converted to Mormonism, he asked Kimball to move on so as not to lose his whole congregation.

On April 10, 1838, Jennetta Richards received her patriarchal blessing alongside Hannah Greenwood. Although her blessing was given by a patriarch, Heber Kimball was in attendance and participated in the blessing.

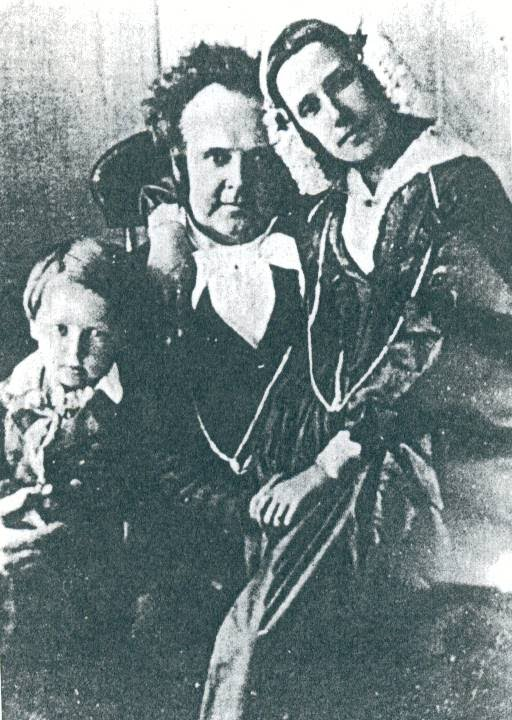
Daguerreotype taken on March 26, 1845 of Jennetta Richards with her husband Willard Richards and their son Heber John Richards.

== Marriage ==
On the day Jennetta was baptized, Heber Kimball wrote to his fellow missionary, Willard Richards, “I baptized your wife today,” pre-emptively predicting the marriage of Jennetta to Willard Richards. Willard Richards had been assigned to serve in the Bedford area. While visiting the missionaries in Preston, Willard Richards recorded an interaction he had with Jennetta. While walking to a church service together, he remarked, “Richards is a good name; I never want to change it, do you, Jennetta?” She replied, “No, I do not. I think I never will.”

On June 29, 1838, Jennetta Richards became engaged to Willard Richards. They were married on September 24, 1838 in Preston, Lancashire. Jennetta, whose maiden name was Richards, never changed her name from Richards as that became her married name. On July 17, 1839, she gave birth to their first son, whom they named Heber John. However, after contracting smallpox, Heber John died at only five months old. In October of 1840, she gave birth to another son, who they also named Heber John.

== Life in America ==
In April 1841, Jenetta Richards emigrated to America. Willard Richards went ahead of the family to Nauvoo, while Jennetta and Heber John Richards stayed with Willard's sisters in Richmond, Massachusetts.

Willard Richards spent many months in Nauvoo, Illinois working alongside Joseph Smith, founder of the Latter Day Saint movement. Smith received a letter from a lonely Jennetta Richards asking him for the return of her husband. Smith’s response included his gratitude and utmost trust in Willard Richards, and that Willard would be on his way to Massachusetts soon. Willard Richards left Nauvoo on July 1 and arrived in Richmond on July 14, 1842, to find a very ill Jennetta. A week later she returned to full health and accompanied Willard to New York. There they worked on raising money for the Nauvoo Temple and to respond to the anti-Mormon lecture tour of John C. Bennett. After their trip to New York, Jennetta and Willard returned to Richmond to collect their son, Heber John, who they had left with William Richard, his uncle. The family would then return to Nauvoo.

In May 1843, the Richards family participated in the sealing ordinance. They were one of the first five couples to receive this ordinance. Jennetta was one of the first women to receive the endowment ceremony which had recently been given to women. On September 28, 1843, Joseph Smith administered the endowment ceremony to a woman for the first time and Jennetta received it soon after.

== Polygamy ==
Willard Richards engaged in his first polygamous marriage on January 18, 1843. He married Sarah Longstroth and Nanny Longstroth, who were respectively sixteen and fourteen years old. These marriages were not consummated at this time and Sarah and Nancy Longstroth subsequently returned to their home in St. Louis. It was agreed that Sarah and Nancy Longstroth would live with their parents until they grew older. Their relationship with Willard Richards did not progress until both he and the Longstroth family would move to Utah after the death of Jennetta Richards. This meant that Jennetta Richards never lived with the other wives of Willard Richards. Nine months after the polygamous marriage of Richards, Jennetta Richards gave birth to a daughter. Rhoda Ann Willard was born in September 1843.

== Death ==
Jennetta Richards died on July 9, 1845, at the age of 27. She was often sick throughout life, and journal entries of Willard Richards demonstrate that they were both hopeful of another recovery. During the six weeks of her illness, Willard was often found by her bedside. However, despite his best-efforts, she died. Their oldest child, Heber John Richards, thought she died of a broken heart because of Willard's polygamous relations.

The remains of Jennetta Richards were placed in two coffins and then a vault. At her request, she was buried in the front garden of their house in Nauvoo. Her funeral was held at six o’clock on the evening of her death due to the hot weather. John Taylor prayed, a hymn was sung, and both Heber Kimball and Brigham Young spoke.

The grave of Jennetta Richard was moved twice. It is now located on the west side of Durphy Street between White and Hotchkiss streets in Nauvoo, Illinois.
