= The Evening and the Morning Star =

Latter Day Saint newspaper

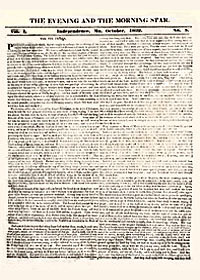
- Type: Monthly newspaper
- Format: Broadsheet
- Founder: W. W. Phelps
- Launched: June 1832
- Ceased publication: September 1834
- Language: English
- City: Independence, Missouri, Kirtland, Ohio
- Country: United States

The Evening and the Morning Star was an early Latter Day Saint movement newspaper published monthly in Independence, Missouri, from June 1832 to July 1833, and then in Kirtland, Ohio, from December 1833 to September 1834. Reprints of edited versions of the original issues were also published in Kirtland under the title Evening and Morning Star.

== Printing in Missouri ==
The Evening and the Morning Star was the first Latter Day Saint newspaper. It was initially published in the printing office of W. W. Phelps in Independence, Missouri. The first issue was printed in June 1832 as volume 1 number 1. Printing continued until the office was destroyed by a mob on 20 July 1833, in response to an article published in The Evening and the Morning Star about U.S. and Missouri laws regarding slavery, African-Americans, and mixed-raced Americans. According to a letter written by John Whitmer and Phelps, proslavery Missourians responded with an outraged manifesto, in which Mormons were decried as "...deluded fanatics, or weak and designing knaves..." and so forth. The mob destroyed Phelps's printing office and numerous incomplete copies of the Book of Commandments. Volume 2 number 14 was the last issue of the newspaper published in Missouri.

== Printing resumed in Ohio ==
After the Latter Day Saints were expelled from Jackson County, Missouri in late 1833, printing of The Evening and the Morning Star temporarily resumed in Kirtland, Ohio, in a printing shop owned by Frederick G. Williams. The editor in Kirtland was Oliver Cowdery and the plan was to eventually replace the Missouri paper with one unique to Ohio. The last issue of the newspaper was September 1834, volume 2 number 24. In it Cowdery wrote, "As The Evening and the Morning Star was designed to be published at Missouri, it was considered that another name would be more appropriate for a paper in this place [Kirtland]; consequently, as the name of this church has lately been entitled the church of the Latter Day Saints... it is no more than just, that a paper disseminating the doctrines believed by the same, and advocating its character and rights, should be entitled 'Messenger and Advocate.'" Thus, in October 1834, The Evening and the Morning Star was succeeded by the Messenger and Advocate.

== Reprint ==
The last issue of The Evening and the Morning Star also announced that all issues of the newspaper would be reprinted in a format that was easier to bind. The reprinted issues were then released sporadically between January 1835 and October 1836 and contained significant changes. The most obvious change was the shortened name, Evening and Morning Star. But there were also a large number of editorial changes, such as articles being rearranged within and among the different issues.

== Origin of title ==
Jesus Christ is referred to in Revelation 22:16 as "the bright and morning star".

Additionally, the planet Venus is given the name "Evening Star" when it appears in the west after sunset and "Morning Star" when it appears in the east before sunrise. Some contest that the movement, or life cycle, of Venus corresponds to that of Jesus Christ and that is why the newspaper received its name of The Evening and the Morning Star.

== See also ==
- Times and Seasons
- The Elders' Journal
- Millennial Star
- List of Latter Day Saint periodicals
