= Elders' Journal =

Latter Day Saint newspaper in Kirtland, Ohio

Elders' Journal of the Church of Jesus Christ of Latter Day Saints
- Type: Newspaper
- Owner: Church of Christ (Latter Day Saints)
- Founded: October 1837
- Ceased publication: August 1838
- Language: English
- City: Kirtland, Ohio and Far West, Missouri
- Country: United States

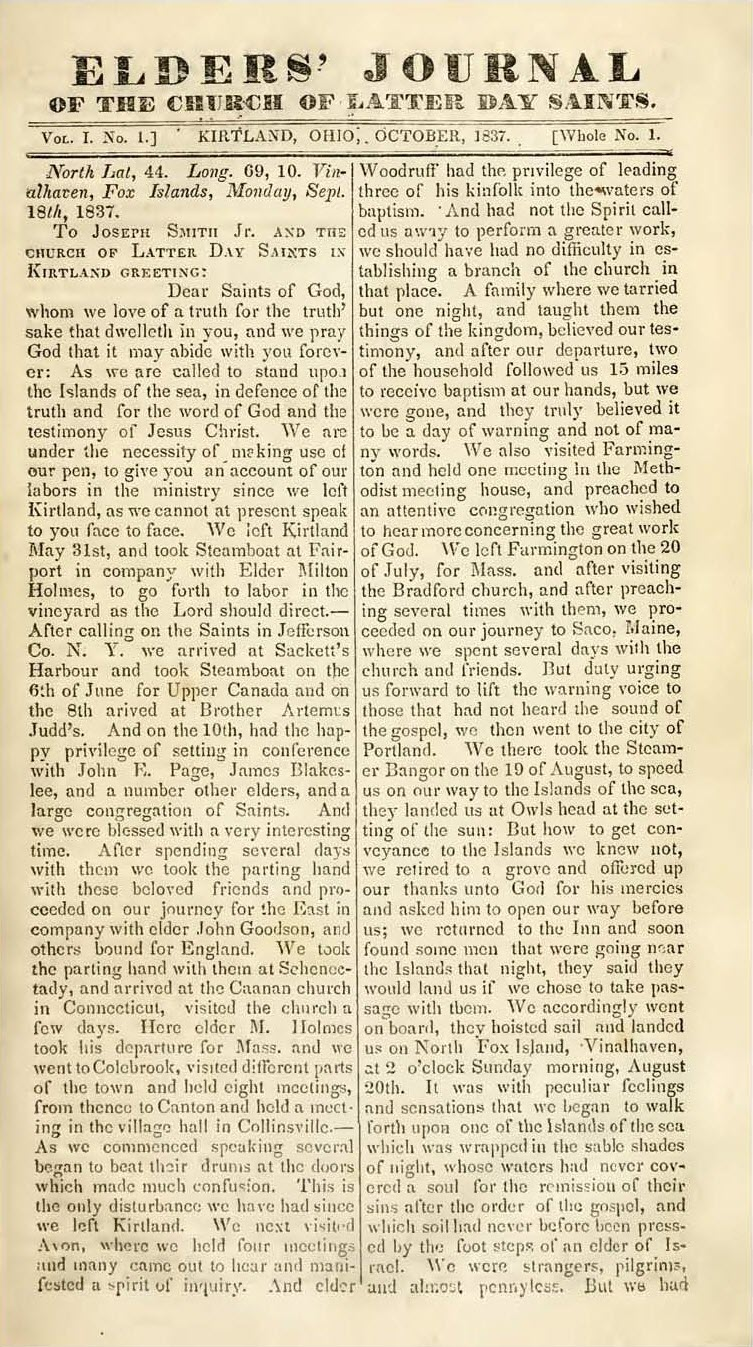
First issue of the Elders’ Journal. Kirtland, Ohio, October, 1837.

The Elders' Journal of the Church of Latter Day Saints (the name changed to Elders' Journal of the Church of Jesus Christ of Latter Day Saints with the third issue) was an early Latter Day Saint periodical edited by Don Carlos Smith, younger brother of Joseph Smith. It was the successor to the Latter Day Saints' Messenger and Advocate and was eventually replaced by the Times and Seasons.

== History ==
Two issues of the Elders' Journal were published in Kirtland, Ohio in 1837. The newspaper was then relocated to Far West, Missouri where two more issues were printed. The first two issues were published on the press that had previously been used to publish the Messenger and Advocate — but this press fell into the hands of Warren Parrish's schismatic "Church of Christ" and a new press had to be obtained before printing could continue. Joseph Smith and Sidney Rigdon relocated to a new headquarters in Far West and continued to publish the Elders' Journal until the events of the 1838 Mormon War in Missouri prevented further operations in the state. The press of the Elders' Journal in Far West, was used by the LDS Church to publish Rigdon's July 4th oration, which was one of the factors that increased tensions between Latter Day Saints and non-Mormons in northwestern Missouri.

== Prospectus ==
The revised prospectus for the periodical (reprinted in No. 3) reads:

"PROSPECTUS for the ELDERS' JOURNAL of the Church of Jesus Christ, of Latter Day Saints.
It is, we presume, generally known, that this paper was commenced in Kirtland, Ohio, in October last; but by reason of the great persecution against the Saints in that place, the paper had to be stopped; and through the craft of wicked men they go possession of the Printing Office, and knowing they could not hold it, it was burned.

The paper is now about to be resuscitated in this place; to be conducted as set forth in the former prospectus. It will be issued in a few weeks, and sent to the former subscribers, as previously stated.

We send this prospectus to arouse the Saints to energy in obtaining subscribers. — We hope the Elders abroad, will not fail to use their influence to give as general a circulation as possible.

The JOURNAL will be Edited by Joseph Smith, jr., and Published by Thomas B. Marsh, at Far West, Caldwell County Missouri.

Terms—One dollar, per annum, paid in advance. All letters must be Post Paid, and directed to the Publisher.
Far West, Mo. April 26, 1838.

== Contents ==
The Elders' Journal contains a number of letters from church leaders, minutes from church conferences as well as notices of marriages and obituaries. The July 1838 issue published a "Q & A" style interview with the editorial board (led by Joseph Smith, Jr.) about Smith's personal history and Mormon beliefs.

== Namesake ==
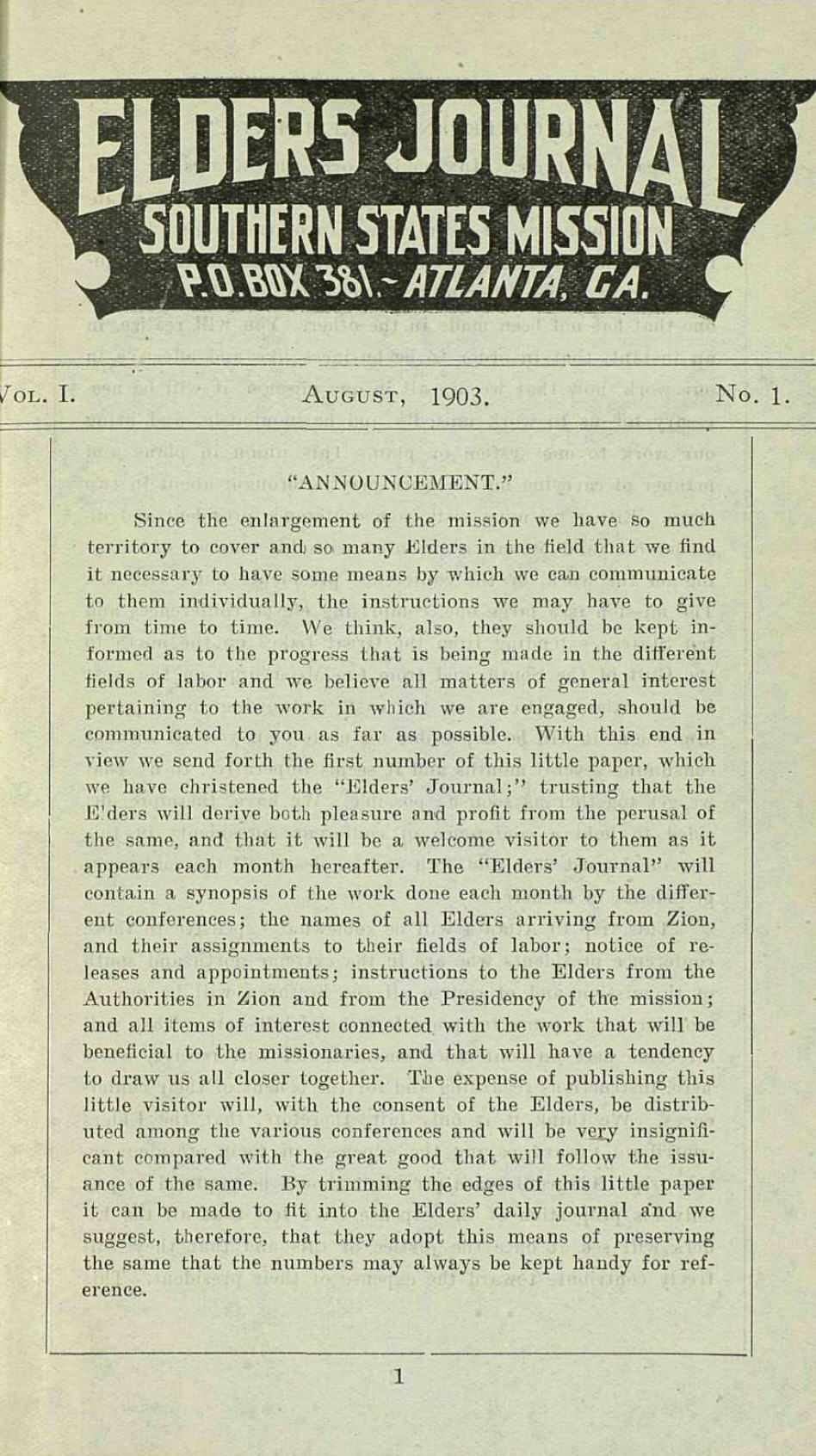
First issue of the new Elders’ Journal. Atlanta Georgia, August, 1903.

Last issue of Liahona The Elders’ Journal. Independence, Missouri, February, 1945.

In 1903, under the direction of Ben E. Rich, the LDS Church's Southern States Mission began publishing a monthly periodical called Elders' Journal, which was named after the 1837–38 periodical of the same name.

By September 1, 1904, the publication had moved from Atlanta, Georgia, to a newly purchased Southern States Mission office in Chattanooga, Tennessee, and, with a price increase from $0.25 to $0.50 annually, became a semi-monthly publication.

In June 1907, the Elders' Journal was merged with The Liahona, a weekly publication created in April 1907 for use in all missions of the LDS Church in the United States. The combined publication was named Liahona: The Elders’ Journal and printed in Independence, Missouri. The new publication retained the format of the Elders' Journal rather than The Liahona and remained semi-monthly. Subscription lists from both publication were combined, roughly 20,000 copies of the first edition were printed, and the consolidated publication continued for the next 37 years.

In the final issue of Liahona: The Elders’ Journal, published February 27, 1945, the editors recommended readers subscribe to one of two LDS Church periodicals; the weekly Church News, or the monthly magazine The Improvement Era. Wrapped with the final issue was a sample copy of the Church News as it was presumably less well known to subscribers than The Improvement Era. The Church News, a weekly insert in the Deseret News, had been available in limited circulation outside of Utah since 1943. The Improvement Era, had been available since 1897.

== See also ==
- The Evening and the Morning Star
- List of Latter Day Saint periodicals
- Messenger and Advocate
- Millennial Star
- Times and Seasons
