= Messenger and Advocate =

Latter Day Saint newspaper in Kirtland, Ohio

Latter Day Saints' Messenger and Advocate
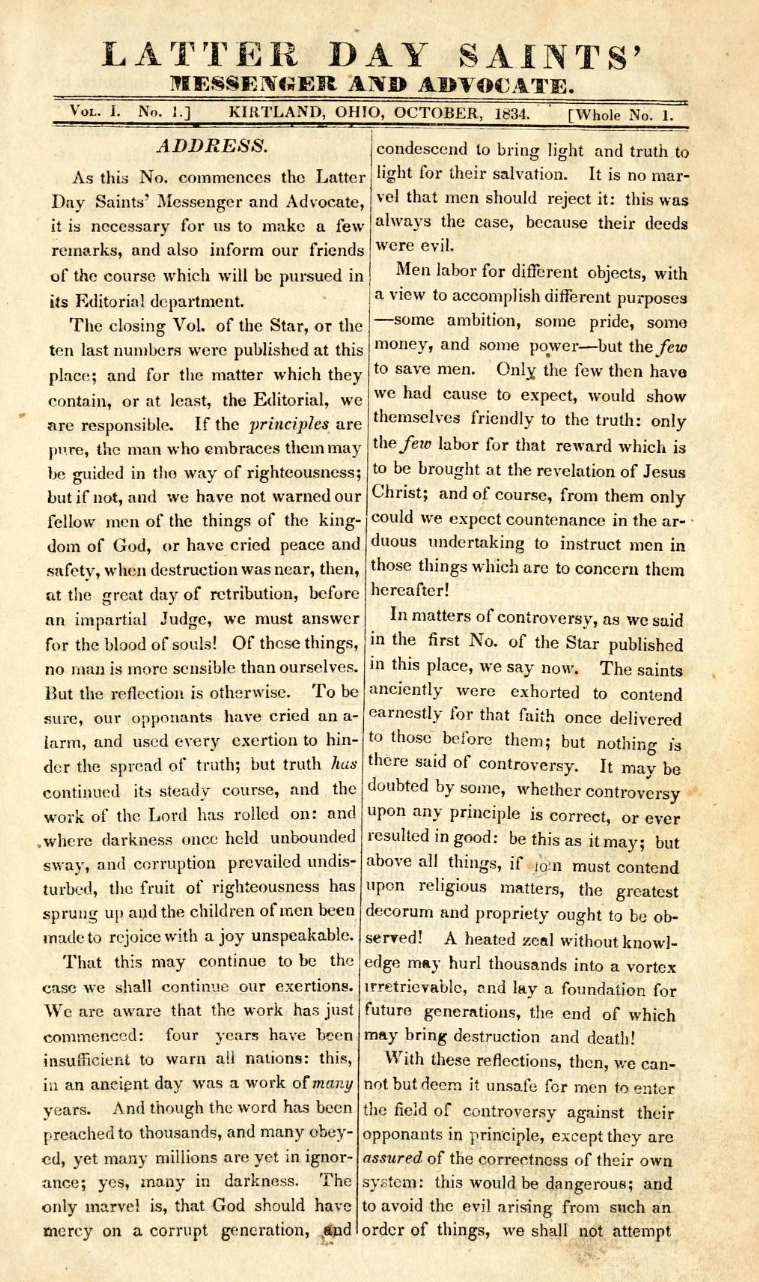
- Type: Monthly newspaper
- Format: Broadsheet
- Founder: Oliver Cowdery
- Publisher: Frederick G. Williams
- Launched: October 1834
- Ceased publication: September 1837
- Language: English
- City: Kirtland, Ohio
- Country: United States

The Latter Day Saints' Messenger and Advocate, often shortened to Messenger and Advocate, was an early Latter Day Saint monthly newspaper published in Kirtland, Ohio, from October 1834 to September 1837. It was the successor to The Evening and the Morning Star and the predecessor to the Elders' Journal.

== History ==
The Messenger and Advocate was established after a mob had destroyed the printing press of The Evening and the Morning Star in Independence, Missouri, on July 20, 1833, causing the Star to relocate to Kirtland. After a brief run, the Star was discontinued in favor of a uniquely Ohio newspaper, the Latter Day Saints' Messenger and Advocate. Oliver Cowdery served as editor and the first issue was printed in October 1834.

The May 1835 issue was the last with Cowdery as editor, because there was "other business and other duties, in which my services are requisite." John Whitmer replaced Cowdery as editor. Whitmer may have been heavily assisted in his duties by W. W. Phelps.

In March 1836, Cowdery again became editor when both Whitmer and Phelps returned to Missouri. Cowdery's brother Warren claimed that he was actually performing the editorial duties. In February 1837, the printing press was sold to Joseph Smith and Sidney Rigdon, and Warren Cowdery became the editor. The last issue was published in September 1837 after LDS Church leaders became dissatisfied with Warren Cowdery's efforts. In October 1837 the newspaper was succeeded by the Elders' Journal.

== Rigdonite Messenger and Advocate ==
In 1844, Sidney Rigdon asserted a claim to be the successor of Joseph Smith and he organized a group of Latter Day Saints in Pittsburgh, Pennsylvania. This group began to publish a periodical in 1845 that revived the name, Latter Day Saints' Messenger and Advocate. Ebenezer Robinson (founding publisher of the LDS newspaper Times and Seasons) became the printer of this Rigdonite paper. After Rigdon changed the name of the church back to the original "Church of Christ," the periodical became the Messenger and Advocate of the Church of Christ.

== Namesake ==
The name "Messenger and Advocate," or variations thereof, has been used many times since the Kirtland and Rigdonite newspapers. In 1977, a short-lived magazine, entitled The New Messenger and Advocate, was published. It was printed by the Guild of Mormon Writers as a means of disseminating their fiction, non-fiction, and poetical writings. The preliminary issue was released in June 1977. Discussions soon began of joining The New Messenger and Advocate with Sunstone Magazine. The merger became official with the release of the November/December 1977 issue of Sunstone Magazine.

From 1984 to 1989, Art Bulla published a newsletter for his newly organized Church of Jesus Christ, a splinter sect of the Church of Jesus Christ of Latter-day Saints. The newsletter carried the name of Zion's Messenger and Advocate. It was created as a "vehicle for the free expression of news and views, concerning doctrine and events which surround the coming forth of the Kingdom of Zion at this time."

Another sect of the Latter Day Saint movement, the Independent Church of Jesus Christ of Latter Day Saints, also published a periodical using the "Messenger and Advocate" title. The magazine, called the Independent Latter Day Saints' Messenger and Advocate, was first published in January 1987 with Christopher C. Warren as editor. It was meant to be the voice for the Independent Church, which was "divided into three self-governing and autonomous organisations known, respectively, as the Church of the Firstborn, the Church of Christ, and the Restoration Christian Fellowships.

Currently, there is a popular Mormon-themed blog, part of the so-called Bloggernacle or community of Mormon blogs, that carries the name "Messenger and Advocate".

== See also ==
- List of Latter Day Saint periodicals
