= Times and Seasons =

Latter Day Saint newspaper

- “Truth will prevail”
- Type: Monthly and twice-monthly newspaper
- Owner: Church of Christ (Latter Day Saints)
- Founded: November 1839
- Ceased publication: February 1846
- Language: English
- City: Nauvoo, Illinois
- Country: United States

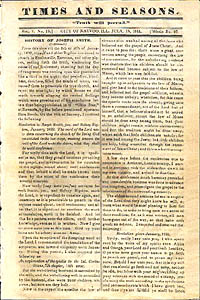

Times and Seasons was a 19th-century Latter Day Saint newspaper published at Nauvoo, Illinois. It was printed monthly or twice-monthly from November 1839 to February 1846. The motto of the paper was "Truth will prevail," which was printed underneath the title heading. It was the successor to the Elders' Journal and was the last newspaper published by the Church in the United States before the schisms that occurred after the death of Joseph Smith.

== History ==
As members of the early Church of Jesus Christ of Latter-day Saints fled Missouri as a result of the 1838 Mormon War, the press and type for the Elders' Journal was buried in Far West. In April 1839, Elias Smith and Hiram Clark, among others, returned to the city and recovered the press and type. It was taken to Nauvoo and in June 1839 was given to Ebenezer Robinson and Don Carlos Smith (younger brother of Joseph Smith), who served as the editors. In December 1840, Robinson moved exclusively to book printing while Don Carlos took over as the sole editor of the Times and Seasons. In May 1841, Robert B. Thompson joined as an editor. After the death of Don Carlos in 1841, Robinson rejoined as an editor and worked with Thompson on a single issue before Thompson's death, just twenty days after the death of Don Carlos. Robinson was then joined by Gustavus Hills for a few issues before he deeded the print shop to Joseph Smith. in January 1842. Joseph acted as director of the print shop and was listed as editor in the Times and Seasons, but operation was actually run by John Taylor and Wilford Woodruff. In November 1842, Taylor became the principal editor, but was still assisted by Woodruff. The printing office was eventually sold to Taylor directly in January 1844.

== Contents ==
The publication was the first to include such significant Latter Day Saint documents as The Wentworth Letter, a construction of the King Follett Discourse, the Book of Abraham (which was later canonized in 1880 by the LDS Church as part of their Pearl of Great Price), the personal history of Joseph Smith, and the announcement of the assassination of Joseph and Hyrum Smith.

== Namesakes ==
From 1974 to 1977, a periodical entitled The New Times and Seasons was published by the Church of Jesus Christ Restored, a group that broke from the RLDS Church in 1979. The church's president, Stanley M. King, opened the first issue with a prospectus claiming the paper was a continuation of the original Times and Seasons. The paper republished many articles, letters, and other materials published in the original Nauvoo newspaper. It was published in Owen Sound, Ontario.

Another breakaway sect, the True and Living Church of Jesus Christ of Saints of the Last Days, which split from the LDS church, published a periodical entitled The Manti Times and Seasons. Its purpose was "to uplift and encourage all those who truly seek to reclaim the House of Israel and redeem the Zion of our God." The first issue was published in August 1996. The periodical was edited and printed by J. K. Braddy in Manti, Utah.

== See also ==
- The Evening and the Morning Star
- Messenger and Advocate
- Elders' Journal
- Millennial Star
- List of Latter Day Saint periodicals
