= Millennial Star =

Mormon periodical

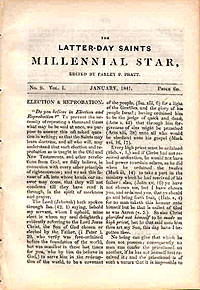
- First page of the January 1841 edition
- Type: Weekly, semi-monthly, and monthly newspaper
- Format: Broadsheet
- Owner: The Church of Jesus Christ of Latter-day Saints
- Founder: Parley P. Pratt
- Publisher: Various
- Editor: Various (see Editors section)
- Founded: May 1840
- Language: English
- Country: United Kingdom
- OCLC number: 1604954

The Latter-day Saints’ Millennial Star (usually shortened to Millennial Star) was the longest continuously published periodical of the Church of Jesus Christ of Latter-day Saints (LDS Church), and was printed in England from 1840 until 1970, when it was replaced by the church-wide Ensign. It was primarily aimed at British Latter-day Saints.

== History ==
The first issue of the Millennial Star was published in Manchester, England, in May 1840, with Latter Day Saint Apostle Parley P. Pratt as editor and W. R. Thomas as printer. First mention of the newspaper being sold in Liverpool appeared in March 1842, and printing was officially moved to Liverpool with the April 1842 issue. Pratt was eventually replaced as editor by Thomas Ward. When Ward left England, Orson Hyde, who was then serving as Mission president in the area, became the editor. After that point, editing and supervision of the Star fell to the subsequent mission presidents of the church's European Mission, which was based in England.

When Orson Pratt was called as mission president in 1848, he also became the editor and publisher of the Millennial Star. In his first issue as editor, he also printed an address to the members and missionaries of the church.

Although the Star began as a monthly periodical, over the course of its 130-year history, it became a semi-monthly and then weekly paper.

Due to the Priesthood Correlation Program of the LDS Church, which sought to encourage uniformity and extend control over printed materials, the Millennial Star was replaced by Ensign at the end of 1970.

== Editors ==
The following is a list of the editors of the Millennial Star with the time period where they were listed as the editor in the magazine. There are two periods in the 1960s where no editor identification appeared in the issues. During World War II, Edith Russell served as defacto editor when most of the other editors were at the front.

- Parley P. Pratt: May 1840 – October 1842
- Thomas Ward: November 1842 – 1 October 1846
- Orson Hyde: 15 October 1846 – 15 January 1847
- Orson Spencer: 1 February 1847 – 1 August 1848
- Orson Pratt: 15 August 1848 – 15 December 1850
- Franklin D. Richards: 1 January 1851 – 1 May 1852
- Samuel W. Richards: 8 May 1852 – 24 June 1854
- Franklin D. Richards (2nd term): 1 July 1854 – 2 August 1856
- Orson Pratt (2nd term): 9 August 1856 – 24 October 1857
- Samuel W. Richards (2nd term): 31 October 1857 – 6 March 1858
- Asa Calkin: 13 March 1858 – 12 May 1860
- N. V. Jones: 19 May 1860 – 11 August 1860
- Amasa Lyman: 18 August 1860 – 22 December 1860
- George Q. Cannon: 5 January 1861 – 27 August 1864
- Daniel H. Wells: 3 September 1864 – 2 September 1865
- Brigham Young Jr.: 9 September 1865 – 29 June 1867
- Franklin D. Richards (3rd term): 6 July 1867 – 12 September 1868
- Albert Carrington: 19 September 1868 – 14 June 1870
- Horace S. Eldredge: 21 June 1870 – 6 June 1871
- Albert Carrington (2nd term): 13 June 1871 – 21 October 1873
- Lester Herrick: 28 October 1873– 17 March 1874
- Joseph F. Smith: 24 March 1874 – 1 July 1878
- William Budge: 8 July 1878 – 1 November 1880
- Albert Carrington (3rd term): 8 November 1880 – 20 November 1882
- John Henry Smith: 27 November 1882 – 26 January 1885
- Daniel H. Wells (2nd term): 2 February 1885 – 14 February 1887
- George Teasdale: 21 February 1887 – 29 September 1890
- Brigham Young Jr. (2nd term): 6 October 1890 – 12 June 1893
- Anthon H. Lund: 19 June 1893 – 23 July 1896
- Rulon S. Wells: 30 July 1896 – 8 December 1898
- Platte D. Lyman: 15 December 1898 – 30 May 1901
- Francis M. Lyman: 6 June 1901 – 31 December 1903
- Heber J. Grant: 7 January 1904 – 29 November 1906
- Charles W. Penrose: 6 December 1906 – 9 June 1910
- Rudger Clawson: 16 June 1910 – 25 September 1913
- Hyrum M. Smith: 2 October 1913 – 31 August 1916
- George F. Richards: 7 September 1916 – 3 July 1919
- George Albert Smith: 10 July 1919 – 30 June 1921
- Orson F. Whitney: 7 July 1921 – 16 November 1922
- David O. McKay: 23 November 1922 – 25 December 1924
- James E. Talmage: 1 January 1925 – 22 December 1927
- John A. Widtsoe: 5 January 1928 – 28 September 1933
- Joseph F. Merrill: 5 October 1933 – 24 September 1936
- Richard R. Lyman: 1 October 1936 – 6 October 1938
- Hugh B. Brown: 13 October 1938 – 9 May 1940
- James P. Hill: 16 May 1940 – 31 December 1942
- Andre K. Anastasiou: (January?) 4 February 1943 – April 1944
- Hugh B. Brown (2nd term): May 1944 – June 1946
- Selvoy J. Boyer: July 1946 – February 1950
- Stayner Richards: March 1950 – July 1952
- A. Hamer Reiser: August 1952 – November 1955
- Clifton G. M. Kerr: December 1955 – October 1958
- T. Bowring Woodbury: November 1958 – June 1961
- N. Eldon Tanner: July 1961 – February 1963
- Mark E. Peterson: March 1963 – April 1963
- None Listed: May 1963 – February 1967
- Douglas D. Palmer: March 1967 – July 1967
- None Listed: August 1967 – November 1967
- Monitor C. Noyce: December 1967 – October 1969
- David Boulton: November 1969 – December 1970

== See also ==
- List of Latter Day Saint periodicals
- John Lyon (poet)
