= History of the Church (book) =

1839 history by Joseph Smith and others

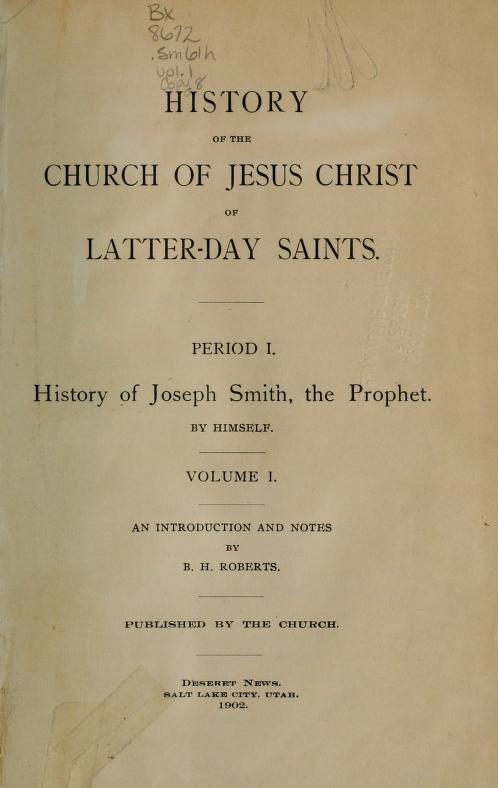
- Author: Joseph Smith and others
- Original title: History of Joseph Smith
- Language: English
- Subject: History of the early Latter Day Saint movement
- Genre: Church history
- Published: 1839–1856
- Publisher: Various (serial publications)
- Media type: Print
- Text: History of the Church at Wikisource

History of the Church (cited as HC) (originally entitled History of Joseph Smith; first published under the title History of the Church of Jesus Christ of Latter-day Saints; nicknamed Documentary History of the Church or DHC) is a semi-official history of the early Latter Day Saint movement during the lifetime of founder Joseph Smith. It is largely composed of Smith's writings and interpretations and editorial comments by Smith's secretaries, scribes, and after Smith's death, historians of the Church of Jesus Christ of Latter-day Saints (LDS Church). The history was written between 1839 and 1856 (Jessee 1976). Part of it was published in Times and Seasons and other church periodicals. It was later published in its entirety with extensive annotations and edits by B. H. Roberts as part of a seven-volume series beginning in 1902 as History of the Church of Jesus Christ of Latter-day Saints.

== Authorship, editorship, and initial publication ==
The body of the work is "a narrative of the prophet Joseph Smith"; most of the text was written by scribes rather than by Smith. The parts of the work attributed to Smith were either dictated by Smith to a scribe or consist of a secretary or historian independently outlining Smith's activities and statements for a given time period. Much of the writing occurred after Smith's death in 1844. From handwriting analysis, scholars have identified the following men as the primary scribal authors of the work during the time periods indicated:

- Oliver Cowdery (1829–38)
- John Whitmer (1829–38)
- Sidney Rigdon (1830–38)
- Frederick G. Williams (1832–39)
- Orson Hyde (1833–36)
- W. W. Phelps (1831?–44)
- Warren Parrish (1835–37)
- Sylvester Smith (1834–36)
- Warren A. Cowdery (1836–38)
- George W. Robinson (1836–40)
- James Mulholland (1838–39)
- Robert B. Thompson (1839–41)
- Howard Coray (1840–41)
- James Sloan (1840–43)
- Willard Richards (1841–54)
- William Clayton (1842–44)
- Thomas Bullock (1843?–56)
- Robert Lang Campbell (1845–50, 1854–56)
- Leo Hawkins (1853–56)
- Jonathan Grimshaw (1853–56)

Although Smith died in 1844, the compilation of his actions and words was not completed until 1856. Apostle Willard Richards was the chief editor of the work from 1841 until 1854. Apostle George A. Smith was the chief editor from 1854 until its completion in 1856. After Smith's death, apostle Wilford Woodruff allowed his extensive journal entries to be used to coordinate dates and clarify statements made by Smith.

Most of the material that resulted in History of Joseph Smith had been originally published in serial form over a 25-year period in the Times and Seasons, the Deseret News, or the Millennial Star.

== Revision, renaming and republication ==
Beginning in 1902, a general authority of the LDS Church, B. H. Roberts, was commissioned by the First Presidency to work through History of Joseph Smith and correct errors, add corroborative material, improve the narrative, and provide commentary on the events. Roberts's extensive revision of the work resulted in it being republished by church-owned Deseret Book between 1902 and 1912 as the seven-volume History of the Church of Jesus Christ of Latter-day Saints. The work soon became nicknamed the Documentary History of the Church, a usage which has only recently been abandoned by Mormon historians.

Today, the work is published in essentially the same form created by Roberts. Deseret Book currently publishes the work in paperback under the shortened title History of the Church.

== Volumes ==
History of the Church is published in seven volumes. The dates covered by each volume is as follows:

- Volume 1: 1805 – December 1833
- Volume 2: January 1834 – December 1837
- Volume 3: January 1838 – July 1839
- Volume 4: July 1839 – May 1842
- Volume 5: May 1842 – August 1843
- Volume 6: September 1843 – June 1844
- Volume 7: June 1844 – October 1848

== Status in the LDS Church ==
History of Joseph Smith was initially published as an official publication of the LDS Church. Although Roberts's History of the Church has never been granted "official history" status, it nonetheless is widely used in the church and is often cited in the sermons and magazine articles written by general authorities and other church leaders.

In 1851, extracts from what would become History of Joseph Smith were published in a church publication entitled Pearl of Great Price. This book was canonized by the LDS Church on October 10, 1880. The portion of History of Joseph Smith that was canonized consists of Smith's recitation of events between his birth in 1805 and May 1829 and is officially entitled Joseph Smith–History.

Although History of the Church is no longer an official publication, it is the most-cited source in two histories of the church which are official publications of LDS Church: Our Heritage: A Brief History of The Church of Jesus Christ of Latter-day Saints and Church History in the Fulness of Times.

== Criticism ==
Jerald and Sandra Tanner have alleged that when History of the Church is compared to the original manuscripts from which it is drawn, "more than 62,000 words" can be identified that were either added or deleted. One response to these charges points out that the methods used in creating History of the Church—while flawed by today's standards—were not uncommon practices in the nineteenth century, even by reputable historians.

== See also ==
- Teachings of the Prophet Joseph Smith (a single volume of selections from History of the Church)
- Comprehensive History of The Church of Jesus Christ of Latter-day Saints
- Saints: The Story of the Church of Jesus Christ in the Latter Days
