= Walter Clisbee Lyman =

American politician (1863–1942)

Walter Clisbee Lyman (October 1, 1863 – July 19, 1942) was a member of the Utah State Legislature and a leader in the Church of Jesus Christ of Latter-day Saints (LDS Church).

== Biography ==
Lyman was born at Fillmore, Utah Territory to Amasa M. Lyman and his wife Caroline E. Partridge, a daughter of Edward Partridge. Lyman was largely raised in Oak City, Utah. In 1883, he married Silvia Lovell. In 1886, he moved to Salt Lake City where he was involved in the founding of the Utah Implement Company. Silvia died in 1886 and in 1889 Lyman married Libbie Finlinson. Lyman was the father of 13 children.

In 1896, Lyman moved to San Juan County, Utah, where he was involved in building canals to increase farming resources. In 1899, he went to serve in the Northern States Mission of the LDS Church, based in Chicago, Illinois. He became president of that mission in 1900 and served as such until 1902. From 1902 until 1911 he served as president of the San Juan Stake.

In politics, Lyman served as a San Juan County Commissioner and as a member of the Utah State Legislature. He died at Moab, Utah.

== Sources ==
- Andrew Jenson. Latter Day Saint Biographical Encyclopedia, vol. 3, p. 154–55.
