= History of the Church =

History of the Church may refer to:

- History of Christianity
- History of the Catholic Church
- History of the Church of Jesus Christ of Latter-day Saints
- Church History (Eusebius), or Ecclesiastical History, a 4th-century history of Early Christianity
- History of the Church (book), a 19th-century history of the early Latter Day Saint movement
- History of the Australian band The Church
