= Elias Higbee =

Early leader in the Latter Day Saint movement

Church Recorder Church of Jesus Christ of Latter Day Saints
- October 1840 – December 1842
- Called by: Joseph Smith
- Predecessor: George W. Robinson
- Successor: Willard Richards

Church Historian Church of Jesus Christ of Latter Day Saints
- April 6, 1838 – October 1840
- Called by: Joseph Smith
- Predecessor: John Corrill
- Successor: Robert B. Thompson

Personal details
- Born: October 23, 1795; Galloway Township, New Jersey, United States
- Died: June 8, 1843 (aged 47); Nauvoo, Illinois, United States
- Cause of death: cholera
- Resting place: Old Nauvoo Burial Grounds; 40.5364°N 91.3506°W
- Spouse(s): Sarah Elizabeth Ward
- Children: 12
- Parents: Isaac Higbee; Sophia Somers

Elias Higbee (October 23, 1795 – June 8, 1843) was an associate of Joseph Smith, a prominent Danite, and an official historian and recorder in the Church of Jesus Christ of Latter Day Saints.

== Biography ==
Born in Galloway Township, New Jersey, to Isaac Higbee and Sophia Somers, Higbee joined the Latter Day Saint church in 1832 in Ohio. He and his family joined the gathering of Latter Day Saints in Kirtland, Ohio, later that year. In 1833 the Higbees and other Latter Day Saints attempted to settle in Jackson County, Missouri, but were forced to return to Kirtland in 1835. They again tried to settle in Missouri in 1836, this time in Clay County. While in Missouri, Higbee was a Caldwell County judge and a leading officer of the county militia. He also served missions in Missouri, Illinois, Indiana, and Ohio. Eventually, the events of the 1838 Mormon War again forced the Higbees to leave Missouri and by 1839 they had settled with the majority of Latter-Day Saints in Commerce, Illinois, which would later be renamed Nauvoo.

In 1838, Higbee became the official historian of the church, and in 1840 he became the church's recorder. In 1839 and 1840, Higbee traveled with Joseph Smith to Washington, D.C., to submit a petition for redress to U.S. President Martin Van Buren. On October 8, 1840, Higbee was appointed by Smith to the committee charged with organizing the construction of the Nauvoo Temple.

Higbee unexpectedly died of cholera on June 8, 1843, in Nauvoo. After his death, Smith stated that Higbee "will again come forth and strike hands with the faithful, and share the glory of the kingdom of God for ever and ever." He was married to Sarah Ward and was the father of twelve children.

== Higbee's questions in the Doctrine and Covenants ==
In the Doctrine and Covenants, part of the scriptural canon of several denominations of the Latter Day Saint movement, answers to several questions about the meaning of the Book of Isaiah posed by Higbee to Joseph Smith are reproduced and have been canonized:

Questions by Elias Higbee: What is meant by the command in Isaiah, 52d chapter, 1st verse, which saith: Put on thy strength, O Zion—and what people had Isaiah reference to? [Answer:] He had reference to those whom God should call in the last days, who should hold the power of priesthood to bring again Zion, and the redemption of Israel; and to put on her strength is to put on the authority of the priesthood, which she, Zion, has a right to by lineage; also to return to that power which she had lost. What are we to understand by Zion loosing herself from the bands of her neck; 2d verse? We are to understand that the scattered remnants are exhorted to return to the Lord from whence they have fallen; which if they do, the promise of the Lord is that he will speak to them, or give them revelation. See the 6th, 7th, and 8th verses. The bands of her neck are the curses of God upon her, or the remnants of Israel in their scattered condition among the Gentiles.

== Notes ==
Church of Jesus Christ of Latter Day Saints
Preceded by George W. Robinson	Church Recorder; October 1840 – December 1842	Church Historian and Recorder titles merged Succeeded by Willard Richards
Preceded by John Corrill	Church Historian; April 6, 1838 – October 1840	Succeeded by Robert B. Thompson
