= Comprehensive History of The Church of Jesus Christ of Latter-day Saints =

1930 work by B.H. Roberts

A Comprehensive History of the Church of Jesus Christ of Latter-day Saints: Century I
- Author: B. H. Roberts
- Language: English
- Subject: Mormon history
- Publisher: The Church of Jesus Christ of Latter-day Saints and Deseret News Press
- Publication date: April 6, 1930
- Publication place: United States
- Media type: Print (Hardcover)
- Pages: 3,459 (6 volumes)
- OCLC: 03366367
- Preceded by: The History of the Mormon Church
- Followed by: Saints: The Story of the Church of Jesus Christ in the Latter Days

A Comprehensive History of The Church of Jesus Christ of Latter-day Saints: Century I is a six-volume history published in 1930 and written by B.H. Roberts, a general authority and Assistant Church Historian of the Church of Jesus Christ of Latter-day Saints (LDS Church). It should not be confused with the seven-volume History of the Church of Jesus Christ of Latter-day Saints (nicknamed Documentary History of the Church), which was also produced by Roberts in the early 20th-century but as an editor and which focused on the history of Joseph Smith.

== Background ==
After the American Historical Magazine, owned by the American Historical Society, published articles on the Spalding–Rigdon theory of Book of Mormon authorship, B. H. Roberts, the LDS Church's Assistant Church Historian, asked the magazine to allow him to publish a rebuttal. After his four-part response, the editor was so pleased that he invited Roberts to write a detailed history of the LDS Church. The magazine was willing to change its frequency and format to accommodate the size of this task. From 1909 to 1915, Roberts wrote "The History of the Mormon Church" in forty-two-page installments for each issue of the magazine (by that time renamed Americana and sometimes called Americana Illustrated).

After the final article appeared, the church's First Presidency wanted to publish the work in six volumes, but this was dropped due to the cost, despite the willingness of Roberts. He even considered condensing the material into a single volume after Joseph Fielding Smith's one-volume Essentials in Church History was authorized for publication. In 1928, apostle George Albert Smith asked Roberts to revisit and update his work for publication in commemoration of the church's 1930 centennial.

For this reference work used by members of the church, a separate index volume was published in 1959 by the Brigham Young University Library.

== Reception ==
Comprehensive History has been called the "most important historical labor" by Roberts and "his magnum opus." It is seen as the "high-water mark" of historical studies before the academics of the New Mormon History and was "far superior to any history of Mormonism which had yet appeared." It was the first to publish some major portions of recent history and to chronicle so wide a period of the Latter Day Saint movement's past in one work. It referenced copious primary and secondary sources and sought to reject historical myths, "the untruth, the spectacular, the bizarre" that was "based on worthless testimony". The work has been criticized for manifesting a strong Mormon bias and using Romantic, "rhapsodic prose that sometimes overshoots the mark", but as late as 2001 was nevertheless considered "unsurpassed for its detail and for its comprehensive treatment" as a synthesis of Latter-day Saint history.

== Volumes summary ==
- Volume I

Joseph Smith's early history until the church's experience in Missouri

- Volume II

Settlement in Illinois up unto the exodus from Illinois

- Volume III

The pioneer trek up until federal intervention in Salt Lake City

- Volume IV

Various events in Utah Territory in the 1850s

- Volume V
- Volume VI

Events leading up to the Manifesto, Utah statehood, and other events to 1930

== See also ==
- Latter-day Saint Biographical Encyclopedia, a biographical dictionary of the LDS Church from 1830 to 1930
