= John Corrill =

American politician

Second Counselor to the Bishop of the Church
- June 6, 1831 – August 1, 1837
- Called by: Edward Partridge
- End reason: Honorably released

Personal details
- Born: September 17, 1794; Worcester County, Massachusetts, United States
- Died: September 26, 1842 (aged 48); Adams County, Illinois, United States
- Notable works: A Brief History of the Church of Christ of Latter Day Saints

John Corrill (September 17, 1794 – September 26, 1842) was an early member and leader of the Church of Jesus Christ of Latter Day Saints, and an elected representative in the Missouri State Legislature. He was prominently involved in the Mormon conflicts in Missouri before leaving the church in 1839 and publishing A Brief History of the Church of Christ of Latter Day Saints (Commonly Called Mormons).

== Biography ==
Corrill was born near Barre, Massachusetts. He worked as a carriage builder, surveyor, and architect and married a woman named Margaret, with whom he had at least five children. Historians believe his writing ability and personal library suggest he may have had some formal education.

While living in Harpersfield, Ohio in 1830 the town was visited by Oliver Cowdery, Parley P. Pratt, Peter Whitmer, and Ziba Peterson, Mormon missionaries on their way to Missouri. After reading from the Book of Mormon, Corrill decided it was a fraud. He was later surprised to hear of the conversion of Sidney Rigdon, a preacher in nearby Kirtland who was planning a preaching tour with Corrill. While visiting Kirtland, Corrill attended some Mormon meetings and witnessed miraculous speaking in languages unknown to the speakers. After further investigation, he was baptized on January 10, 1831 in Ashtabula, Ohio. A few days later he was ordained an Elder.

=== Church positions ===
In 1831 Corrill served two short missions in nearby areas. One of these was to New London, Ohio. Later that year he was ordained to the High Priesthood and made an assistant to the Latter Day Saint movement's first Bishop of the Church, Edward Partridge, a position he would hold until 1837. In 1833, Corrill was chosen as the third bishop in Zion (Independence, Missouri) where he would later preside over a branch of the church. When Missourians expelled Mormons from the area, Corrill joined in petitioning the governor for militia assistance and settled in Clay County for the winter.

In 1834 he was called back to Kirtland where he helped build the temple and was involved with approving a new book of revelations called the Doctrine and Covenants. After the temple's dedication in 1836 he returned to Missouri and was one of the founders and leaders of the Mormon settlement of Far West. During this time the residents of Clay County were pushing for the Mormons to move out of their area and settle elsewhere. In late 1836 Corrill represented the Mormons in negotiating with state leaders for the formation of Caldwell County for primarily Mormon settlement. Historian Stephen C. LeSueur wrote that Corrill "was one of the Mormons' most prominent leaders in Missouri and had been intimately involved in nearly every phase of Mormon history there." In 1837 he was released as a counselor to Bishop Partridge and was called to a committee for organizing more stakes in Missouri and was "Keeper of the Lord's Storehouse" in Far West. In April 1838 he and Elias Higbee became the official Church Historians.

=== Missouri Mormon War ===
Corrill was elected by the primarily Mormon residents of Caldwell County to be the county's first representative to the Missouri State Legislature in August 1838. During this same election, distrust between Missourians and Mormons erupted into an armed conflict, known today as the Missouri Mormon War. Corrill witnessed many key events and was involved in surrendering and turning over Joseph Smith to the state militia, which Smith saw as a betrayal. At the Richmond hearings in November, Corrill testified for the state against Smith and the Mormon actions in the conflict.

Disfavor grew between Corrill and the Mormons. Some Mormons had in the past accused him of opposing priesthood authority and "the Judgment of God" in his preference for autonomy and democracy in the church. In his only term in the Missouri House of Representatives, as a state representative after the armed conflict subsided, Corrill presented a petition from the Mormons for relief from their mistreatment. However, he continued to distance himself from the church, culminating in his excommunication in Quincy, Illinois on March 17, 1839. After this event, he published "a 50 page pamphlet attempting to justify his reasons" for leaving the church.

Corrill died in Adams County, Illinois in 1842 at the age of 48.

== A Brief History of the Church of Christ of Latter Day Saints ==
Corrill is remembered for his 50-page booklet published in 1839, entitled A Brief History of the Church of Christ of Latter Day Saints (commonly called Mormons,) including an account of their doctrine and discipline, with the reasons of the author for leaving the Church.

Historian Richard L. Bushman's noted 2005 biography, Joseph Smith: Rough Stone Rolling, described Corrill as rational, coolheaded, and cautious, illustrating the "clash between Mormonism and republicanism" when he questioned whether he must sacrifice his freewill or autonomy to the Kingdom of God. Bushman's book used Corrill's A Brief History as source material on the early church. Corrill's account has been called "perhaps, the single most important source of information for events surrounding the Mormon War in Missouri." In contrast, historian Susan Easton Black described Corrill as bitter and his published history as a product of his apostasy.

== Sources ==
- Bushman, Richard L. (2005), Joseph Smith: Rough Stone Rolling, New York: Knopf, ISBN 1-4000-4270-4.
- Winn, Kenneth H. (1994), "'Such Republicanism as This': John Corrill's Rejection of Prophetic Rule", in Roger D. Launius; Linda Thatcher (eds.), Differing Visions: Dissenters in Mormon History, Chicago: University of Illinois Press, pp. 45–75, ISBN 0-252-02069-3.
- Jenson, Andrew (1901), "Corrill, John", LDS Biographical Encyclopedia, vol. 1, Salt Lake City: Andrew Jenson History Company / Deseret News Press, pp. 241–242.

Church of Jesus Christ of Latter Day Saints titles
New title	Second Counselor to the Bishop of the Church; February 4, 1831 – May 27, 1840	Succeeded by Titus Billings
Previous: Oliver Cowdery	Church Historian; Early 1838 – April 6, 1838	Succeeded by Elias Higbee
