= History of Joseph Smith by His Mother =

1853 biography by Lucy Mack Smith

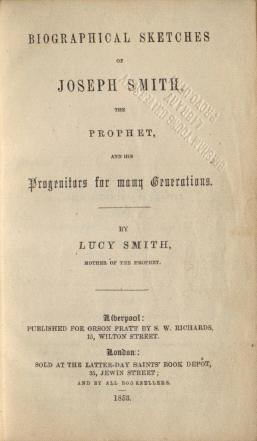
- Title page of the first edition in 1853.
- Author: Lucy Mack Smith
- Language: English
- Subject: Joseph Smith
- Genre: Biography
- Publisher: Published for Orson Pratt by S. W. Richards
- Publication date: 1853
- Publication place: England
- Media type: Print (Hardcover)
- Pages: 297 pp

History of Joseph Smith by His Mother is a biography of Joseph Smith, founder of the Latter Day Saint movement, according to his mother, Lucy Mack Smith. It was originally titled Biographical Sketches of Joseph Smith, the Prophet, and His Progenitors for Many Generations and was published by Orson Pratt in Liverpool in 1853.

== Background ==
Shortly following the death of Joseph Smith in 1844, and into 1845, Lucy Mack Smith dictated her recollections and family story to Nauvoo schoolteacher Martha Jane Coray. Coray worked with her husband to compile these books of notes and other sources into a manuscript, which was then copied.

One copy was given to apostle Brigham Young, and the other stayed with Lucy Smith in Nauvoo. Eventually, apostle Orson Pratt obtained Lucy's copy and published it in 1853, to great controversy.

=== Brigham Young's opposition ===
After its publication, Brigham Young declared the book to be a "tissue of lies" and wanted corrections made. In the Millennial Star in 1855, he said,

There are many mistakes in the work ... I have had a written copy of those sketches in my possession for several years, and it contains much of the history of the Prophet Joseph. Should it ever be deemed best to publish these sketches, it will not be done until after they are carefully corrected.

In 1865, Young ordered the church members to have their copies destroyed. There was no "corrected" version until the church published a 1901 serialization and 1902 book, which were done under the direction of Joseph F. Smith, Lucy's grandson.

Later historians theorized that Young opposed the book because of his own conflicts with its publisher, Orson Pratt, as well as the book's favorable references to William Smith, Young's opponent and Lucy's son. Lucy Mack Smith portrayed the Smith family as the legitimate leaders of the church, which Young may also have seen as a challenge to his leadership.

== Importance ==
LDS historian Leonard Arrington saw the book as "informative, basically accurate, and extremely revealing of Joseph Smith's early life and family background," and felt it "perhaps tells more about Mormon origins than any other single source. Richard L. Anderson called it one of "the essential sources for Mormon origins." Non-Mormon historian Jan Shipps identifies this history as being "of central importance in the Mormon historical corpus."

== Editions ==
The book has been republished several times, under various publishers, editors and titles. The following is a list of editions with significant changes to the text or title.

- Biographical Sketches of Joseph Smith the Prophet, and His Progenitors for Many Generations, by Lucy Smith, Mother of the Prophet. Liverpool: S.W. Richards for Orson Pratt. 1853.
- Biographical Sketches of Joseph Smith the Prophet and His Progenitors for Many Generations. Plano, Illinois: Reorganized Church of Jesus Christ of Latter Day Saints. 1880.
- Smith, George A.; Smith, Elias, eds. (1902). History of the Prophet Joseph, by His Mother, Lucy Smith, as Revised by George A. Smith and Elias Smith. Salt Lake City, Utah: Improvement Era..
- Nibley, Preston, ed. (1945). History of Joseph Smith, By His Mother, Lucy Mack Smith. Salt Lake City, Utah: Stevens & Wallis.
- Nibley, Preston, ed. (1956). History of Joseph Smith, By His Mother, Lucy Mack Smith. Salt Lake City, Utah: Bookcraft.
- Biographical Sketches of Joseph Smith, the Prophet. New York: Arno Press. 1969.
- Tanner, Jerald and Sandra (1978). Joseph Smith's History By His Mother: The Book Brigham Young Tried to Destroy. Salt Lake City, Utah: Modern Microfilm Co.
- Proctor, Scot Facer; Proctor, Maurine Jensen, eds. (1996). The Revised and Enhanced History of Joseph Smith By His Mother. Salt Lake City, Utah: Bookcraft. ISBN 1-57008-267-7..
- Anderson, Lavina Fielding, ed. (2001). Lucy's Book: A Critical Edition of Lucy Mack Smith's Family Memoir. Salt Lake City, Utah: Signature Books. ISBN 1-56085-137-6.
- Ingleton, R. Vernon, ed. (2005). History of Joseph Smith by His Mother, Lucy Mack Smith; the Unabridged Original Version. Provo, Utah: Stratford Books. ISBN 0-929753-05-4.
