= Howard Coray =

American Latter-day Saint scribe and pioneer (1817–1908)

- Born: May 6, 1817; Dansville, New York, United States
- Died: January 16, 1908 (aged 90); Salt Lake City, Utah, United States
- Resting place: Provo, Utah
- Occupations: Scribe, teacher, bookkeeper, farmer, missionary
- Known for: Clerical work for Joseph Smith; compilation of Lucy Mack Smith's history
- Spouse(s): Martha Jane Knowlton Coray (m. 1841; died 1881); Mary Ann Johnson (m. 1853; divorced 1855)
- Children: 13
- Parent(s): Silas Coray and Mary Stephens

Howard Coray (May 6, 1817 – January 16, 1908) was an American Latter-day Saint scribe, teacher, missionary, and pioneer. He served as a clerk for Joseph Smith, the founder of the Latter Day Saint movement, and participated in early efforts to compile the history of the Church of Jesus Christ of Latter-day Saints (LDS Church). Together with his wife, Martha Jane Knowlton Coray, he helped prepare the autobiographical history of Lucy Mack Smith, Joseph Smith's mother. His writings and reminiscences have subsequently been studied by historians of early Mormonism.

== Early life and religious conversion ==
Howard Coray was born on May 6, 1817, in Dansville, Steuben County, New York, to Silas Coray and Mary Stephens. His family relocated to Pennsylvania around 1827, residing in Luzerne and Northampton counties. In approximately January 1839, Coray moved to Pike County, Illinois.

While living in Illinois, Coray became acquainted with members of the recently established Latter-day Saint movement. He was baptized into the LDS Church on March 25, 1840, by Joseph Wood. Shortly afterward, he traveled to Nauvoo, Illinois, to attend a church conference and meet Joseph Smith.

== Work with Joseph Smith ==
Shortly after arriving in Nauvoo in April 1840, Coray was invited by Joseph Smith to assist with clerical work. His initial assignment was to copy accumulated correspondence into a record book. He subsequently participated in an effort to compile a history of the church.

According to Coray's later recollections, Smith asked him to collaborate with Edwin D. Woolley in organizing and editing historical materials. Coray described his responsibility as arranging information chronologically and improving its grammar and style. After Woolley withdrew from the project, Coray worked with another assistant, identified as Dr. Miller, until the available historical materials were exhausted.

Historian Dean C. Jessee identified Coray's handwriting in Joseph Smith's correspondence from 1838–1843 and in patriarchal records. However, Jessee noted that surviving manuscripts do not establish Coray's direct contribution to the formal church history, possibly because some early records were lost.

On September 3, 1840, Joseph Smith ordained Coray an elder. He was ordained a high priest in Nauvoo on June 4, 1843.

== Marriage and teaching in Nauvoo ==
On February 6, 1841, Coray married Martha Jane Knowlton in Hancock County, Illinois. Martha was also a convert to the LDS Church and was interested in education and historical recordkeeping. The couple eventually had thirteen children.

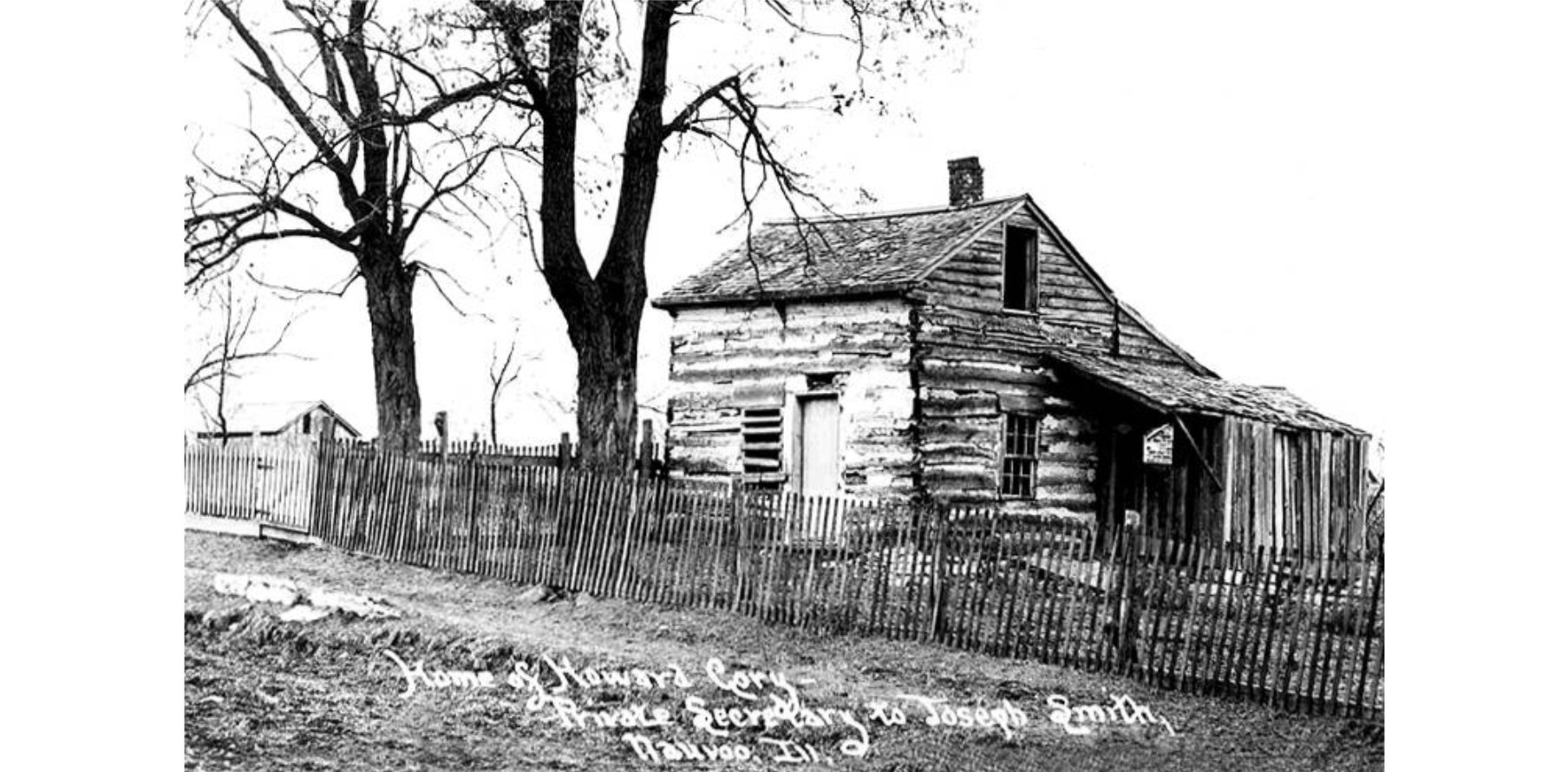
Howard and Martha Coray's former home in Nauvoo, Illinois.

The Corays taught school together in Nauvoo. In 1844, Howard rented the unfinished Nauvoo Music and Concert Hall to accommodate a growing number of students. In his autobiography, he recalled that the building could hold approximately 150 students and that his wife assisted him in operating the school.

Coray also served as a missionary in Pennsylvania from 1842 to 1843. In April 1844, he was called to assist Joseph Smith's presidential campaign and undertake missionary work in Illinois.

== Compilation of Lucy Mack Smith's history ==
One of Coray's principal contributions to early Latter-day Saint historical records was his involvement in preparing the autobiography of Lucy Mack Smith, the mother of Joseph Smith.

During 1844 and 1845, Martha Coray recorded Lucy Mack Smith's recollections concerning the Smith family, the beginnings of Mormonism, and the life of her son. Howard assisted with the editing, compilation, and transcription of the material. The Corays prepared manuscript copies of the completed history, including one intended for church records.

The precise division of work between Howard and Martha has been examined by historians. Richard L. Anderson suggested that Howard's primary responsibility was preparing a finished manuscript from Martha's corrected notes. Later archival research by Sharalyn D. Howcroft identified Howard's editorial work within an earlier manuscript and examined the collaborative processes involved in producing the history.

The resulting work was published in Liverpool in 1853 by Orson Pratt under the title Biographical Sketches of Joseph Smith the Prophet, and His Progenitors for Many Generations. Subsequent editions appeared under titles including History of Joseph Smith by His Mother. The surviving manuscripts have been examined by historians studying the early Latter-day Saint movement.

== Migration to Utah and later career ==
Following the departure of the Latter-day Saints from Nauvoo in 1846, Coray and his family traveled west. They arrived in the Salt Lake Valley in 1850 as members of the John Sharp pioneer company.

Coray subsequently lived in several Utah settlements. Around 1854, the family moved to E. T. City, later known as Lake Point, in Tooele County, Utah. They relocated to Provo, Utah, in 1857 and to Juab County, Utah, in 1871. Coray returned to Provo in the autumn of 1880. During his years in Utah Territory, he worked in several occupations, including farming, teaching, bookkeeping, and clerical work.

In January 1853, Coray entered a plural marriage with Mary Ann Johnson while still married to Martha Jane Knowlton Coray. The marriage to Johnson ended in divorce in 1855.

Coray remained active in the LDS Church throughout his life. From 1882 to 1883, he served another missionary assignment in Smyth County, Virginia. Archival records also document his ordination as a church patriarch in 1897.

Martha Jane Knowlton Coray died in Provo on December 14, 1881. Howard lived for more than twenty-six years after her death. By 1900, he was living in Salt Lake City, where he died on January 16, 1908, at the age of ninety. He was buried in Provo.

== Historical writings and significance ==
Coray left autobiographical writings, correspondence, and personal recollections that provide firsthand accounts of the early Latter-day Saint movement. These include descriptions of his association with Joseph Smith, the church's activities in Nauvoo, and the experiences of Latter-day Saint settlers in Utah.

His recollections of Joseph Smith received scholarly attention in 1977, when historian Dean C. Jessee published Howard Coray's Recollections of Joseph Smith in BYU Studies.

Coray also provided testimony about the early practice of plural marriage in Nauvoo. In an affidavit dated June 12, 1882, he stated that Hyrum Smith had explained the revelation concerning plural marriage to him and Martha in July 1843. His account was later published among historical testimonies concerning the introduction of the practice.

The historical significance of Howard and Martha Coray's recordkeeping has been examined in several scholarly publications, including Elizabeth Ann Anderson's 2007 study of the couple and Sharalyn D. Howcroft's 2018 archival analysis of Lucy Mack Smith's history.

Howard Coray's papers are preserved in the Harold B. Lee Library at Brigham Young University. The collection contains autobiographical writings, correspondence, certificates, and other records relating to his life and his family's activities in the nineteenth-century Latter-day Saint community.
