= Thomas Bullock (Mormon) =

Mormon pioneer

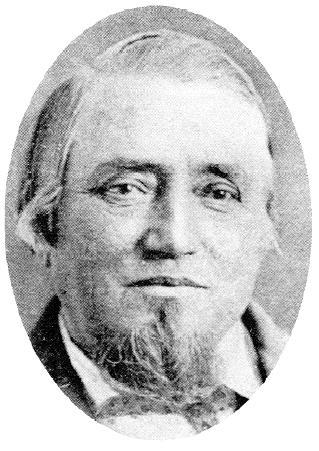

Reporter and Member of the Council of Fifty
- December 25, 1846 – June 24, 1882
- End reason: Released due to old

Clerk in the Church Historian's Office
- c. 1843

Personal details
- Born: December 23, 1816; Leek, Staffordshire, England
- Died: February 10, 1885 (aged 68); Coalville, Utah Territory, United States
- Resting place: Salt Lake City Cemetery; 40°46′37.92″N 111°51′28.8″W

Thomas Bullock (December 23, 1816 – February 10, 1885) was a Mormon pioneer and a clerk in the Church Historian's Office of the Church of Jesus Christ of Latter-day Saints.

== Biography ==
Bullock was born in Leek, Staffordshire, England. Bullock worked as an excise officer for the British government.

On November 20, 1841, Bullock and his wife Henrietta Rushton were baptized members of the Church of Jesus Christ of Latter Day Saints. In 1843, the Bullocks emigrated to Nauvoo, Illinois, where the majority of Latter Day Saints were gathering. In fall of 1843, Bullock was employed as a private clerk to Joseph Smith. He was clerk at the April 1844 general conference of the church, an assistant to Church Historian and Recorder Willard Richards from 1842 to 1854, and was the clerk to the Council of Fifty from 1846 to 1882. While with the Church Historian's Office, Bullock was responsible for writing some portions of History of the Church.

Like many early Latter Day Saints, Bullock practiced plural marriage. In 1846 he married Lucy Clayton, the sister of William Clayton, another prominent clerk in the church. In 1852, Bullock married his third wife, Betsy Prudence Howard.

In 1847, Bullock traveled with the initial Mormon pioneer company that traveled to the Salt Lake Valley. In Utah Territory, Bullock was the clerk of the Perpetual Emigrating Fund Company, clerk to the Utah Territorial Legislature, and was an occasional clerk to Brigham Young and the Quorum of the Twelve Apostles. From 1856 to 1858, Bullock returned to England as a missionary for the church.

Bullock served in the church as a Seventy and in a variety of secretarial positions. He died in Coalville, Utah at the age of 68. Bullock was the father of 23 children, 13 of whom survived to adulthood.
