= Andrew Jenson =

Danish-American historian (1850–1941)

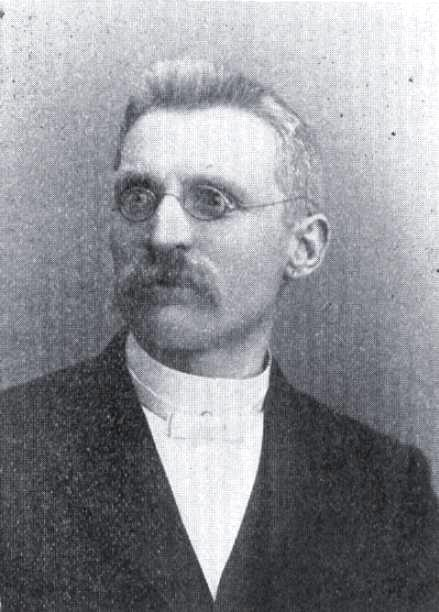

Assistant Church Historian
- 1886 – November 18, 1941
- Called by: Wilford Woodruff
- Predecessor: Franklin D. Richards
- Successor: Preston Nibley

Personal details
- Born: Anders Jensen; December 11, 1850; Torslev parish, Hjørring, Denmark
- Died: November 18, 1941 (aged 90); Salt Lake City, Utah, United States
- Resting place: Salt Lake City Cemetery; 40.7772°N 111.8580°W
- Spouse(s): Kirsten M. Sorensen; Emma T. Howell; Bertha T. Howell
- Parents: Christian Jenson; Kirsten Andersen

Andrew Jenson, born Anders Jensen, (December 11, 1850 – November 18, 1941) was a Danish immigrant to the United States who acted as an Assistant Church Historian of the Church of Jesus Christ of Latter-day Saints (LDS Church) for much of the early-20th century. Jenson also served the church as president of the Scandinavian Mission.

== Early life ==
Anders Jensen was born in Torslev parish, Hjørring, Denmark. His parents joined the LDS Church when he was four. He left Denmark for the United States in 1866. He traveled across the North American Great Plains in Andrew H. Scott's ox company. On coming to Utah Territory he anglicized his name to Andrew Jenson and settled in the Salt Lake Valley.

== Missionary ==
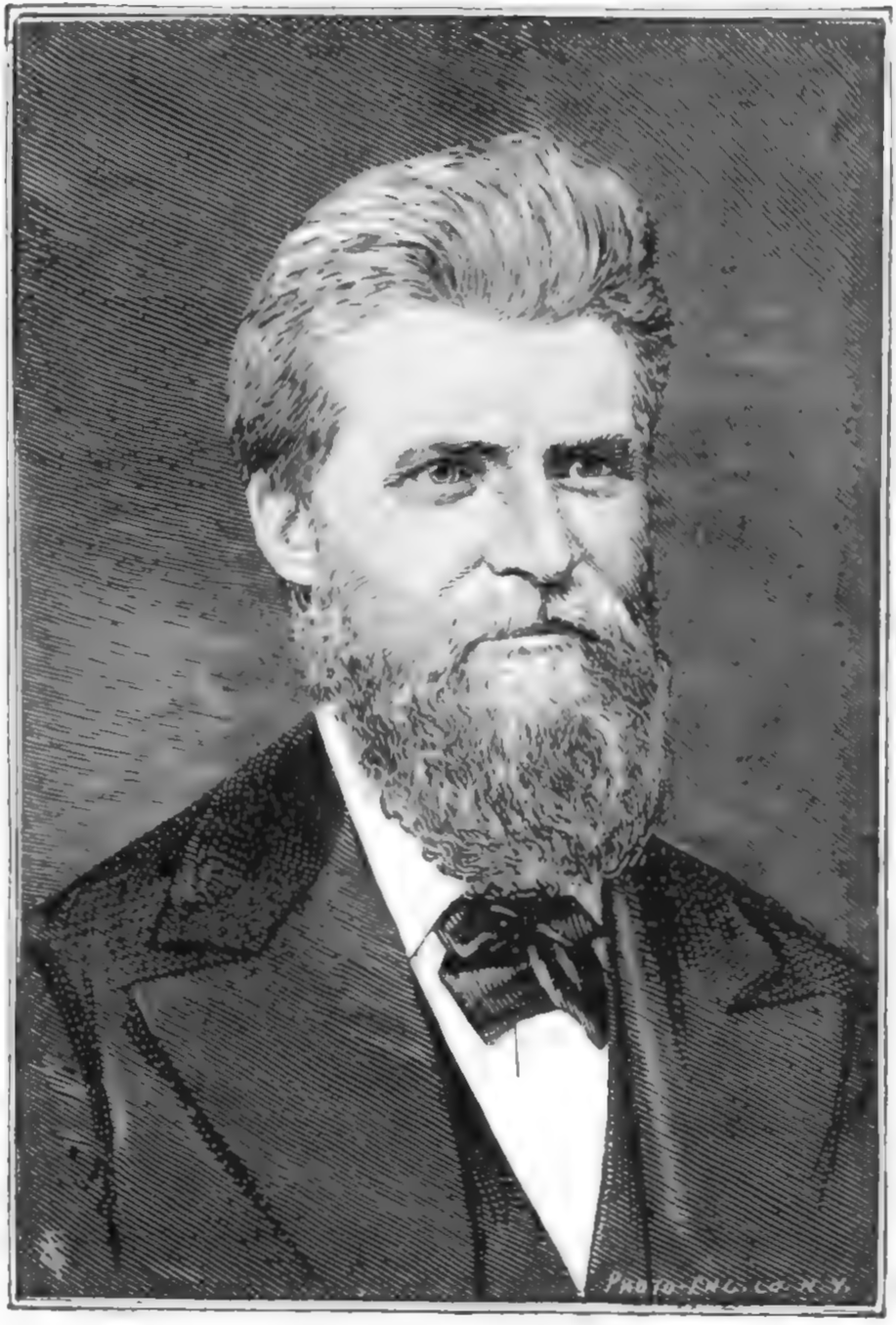
Andrew Jenson, circa 1882

In 1873, Jenson was ordained a seventy in the LDS Church by George Q. Cannon and sent on a mission to Denmark. In 1876, he translated the history of Joseph Smith into Danish. Jenson served a second mission to Denmark from 1879 to 1881. While in Denmark, Jenson established a monthly periodical called Morgenstjernen, which he continued to publish in Utah after his return. After eight years, the periodical changed its name to the Historical Record and was published in English.

== Church historian ==
In 1886, Jenson became a part-time employee of the LDS Church, receiving a small monthly allowance. His assignments included conducting interviews and gathering photographs, historic documents, and other documentation during a trip to historic church sites in the eastern United States. Jenson also gathered similar documents from various church stakes and missions throughout the church, which led to the writing of a manuscript history for each LDS Church ward and stake. Jenson was appointed as a full-time Assistant Church Historian in 1897. Along with John Jaques, Jenson was the Acting Church Historian from 1899 until the appointment of Anthon H. Lund as Church Historian in 1900. Jenson would continue on again as Assistant Church Historian until his death.

During his time in the Church Historian's office, Jenson worked as a writer, presenting the history of the Latter-day Saints from an orthodox perspective. He was also performing archival work and continued to collect records and diaries for the Church Historian's office.

Jenson compiled the four-volume Latter-day Saint Biographical Encyclopedia, a church chronology and an early Latter-day Saint biographical dictionary. He was also closely involved with the compilation of the Journal History of the Church, which has been described by Utah historiographer Gary Topping as ...an immense scrapbook compilation consisting of several hundred volumes of various historical records (in its later years mostly newspaper clippings) documenting Mormon history from the beginning of the church until well into the twentieth century. Jenson's contribution included its chronological organization and a running subject index on thousands of index cards. He also compiled the "Encyclopedic History of the Church of Jesus Christ of Latter-day Saints". Among the men he worked with in Church Historian's office was Joseph Fielding Smith, who later served as Church Historian and eventually as President of the Church.

During the 1890s, Jenson collected all the records he could find concerning the Mountain Meadows massacre. This archive including his own field notes, excerpts of witnesses' diaries, affidavits, newspaper reports, and the transcriptions from the LDS Church's internal investigations. Many participants in the massacre were granted complete confidentiality for the contents of these interview transcriptions. Since Jenson's time, these files were closed to the public and were not available for use by historians. However, in August 2008, LDS historians Ronald W. Walker, Richard E. Turley Jr., and Glen M. Leonard published Massacre at Mountain Meadows through Oxford University Press. A decade in the making, research for the book finally draws from the Jenson archive.

== Published works ==
- Jenson, Andrew (1882–1885). Morgenstjernen (in Danish). Salt Lake City, Utah: Deseret News. OCLC 555984034.
- Jenson, Andrew (1886–1890). Historical Record. Salt Lake City, Utah: Deseret News. OCLC 9513567.
- Jenson, Andrew (1899). Church Chronology: A Record of Important Events Pertaining to the History of the Church of Jesus Christ of Latter-day Saints. Salt Lake City, Utah: Deseret News.
- Jenson, Andrew (1901). Latter-day Saint Biographical Encyclopedia. Vol. 1. Salt Lake City, Utah: Andrew Jenson History Company.
- Jenson, Andrew (1914). Latter-day Saint Biographical Encyclopedia. Vol. 2. Salt Lake City, Utah: Andrew Jenson History Company.
- Jenson, Andrew (1920). Latter-day Saint Biographical Encyclopedia. Vol. 3. Salt Lake City, Utah: Andrew Jenson History Company.
- Jenson, Andrew (1927). History of the Scandinavian Mission. Salt Lake City, Utah: Deseret News Press. OCLC 9545527.
- Jenson, Andrew (1936). Latter-day Saint Biographical Encyclopedia. Vol. 4. Salt Lake City, Utah: Andrew Jenson Memorial Association.
- Jenson, Andrew (1938). Autobiography of Andrew Jenson, Assistant Historian of the Church of Jesus Christ of Latter-day Saints. Salt Lake City, Utah: Deseret News Press. OCLC 5272718.
- Jenson, Andrew (1941). Encyclopedic History of the Church of Jesus Christ of Latter-day Saints. Salt Lake City, Utah: Deseret News Publishing Company.
