= John Jaques (Mormon) =

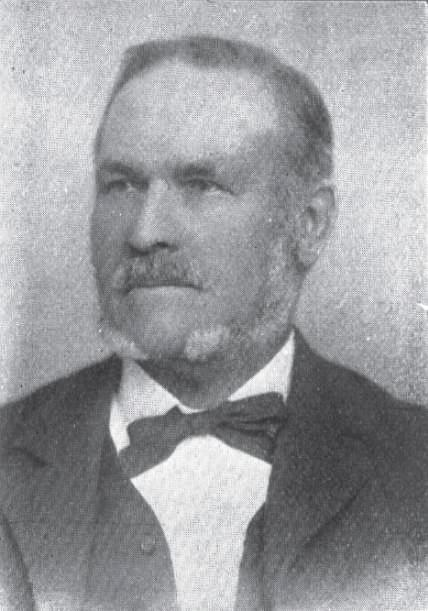

John Jaques (7 January 1827 – 1 June 1900) was a Latter Day Saint hymnwriter and missionary and an Assistant Church Historian for the Church of Jesus Christ of Latter-day Saints.

Jaques was born to Thomas Jaques and Mary Ann Heighington at Market Bosworth, Leicestershire, England. He was baptized a member of the Church of Jesus Christ of Latter Day Saints on 12 July 1848. A short time later, he served as a missionary for the church in Stratford-on-Avon.

Jaques crossed the Atlantic with his wife in 1856 on the Horizon. They landed at Boston and proceeded by train to Iowa City. There they joined the Martin Handcart Company. Jaques' oldest daughter was among the many in that company who died when they were caught in snowstorms in Wyoming.

Jaques wrote many poems and other works, including "Truth." As a young missionary in Stratford-on-Avon he contemplated Pilate's question to Jesus Christ "What is truth?". The poem was included in the first (1851) edition of the Pearl of Great Price. It was also set to music by Ellen Knowles Melling, whom Jaques baptized while preaching in Scotland. Entitled "Oh Say, What is Truth?", the hymn is included in the hymnal of the LDS Church.

In 1869 Jaques returned to England for a two-year mission. He co-edited the Millennial Star with George Teasdale and then from 1870 to 1871 he served as the sole editor of that publication. Jacques also wrote a catechism to teach the doctrines of The Church of Jesus Christ of Latter-day Saints. This was a very respected and popular compendium of Latter-day Saints doctrine in the early period of Church headquarters being in Utah. It is one of the sources that declare God having a specific place to live but still being omnipresent based on the influence and range of the Holy Ghost.

After returning to Utah Territory, Jaques began working for the Deseret News. In 1874 he became the principal editorial writer for this newspaper. He then served as an Assistant Church Historian starting in 1873. While in this position he was on a committee with A. Milton Musser and Franklin D. Richards that presented plans for a Genealogical Association of the church. This association was the forerunner of the Family History Library in Salt Lake City. After the Genealogical Society of Utah was organized, Jaques served as its first librarian.
