= Martha Jane Knowlton Coray =

American Mormon pioneer, record keeper, and educator (1821–1881)

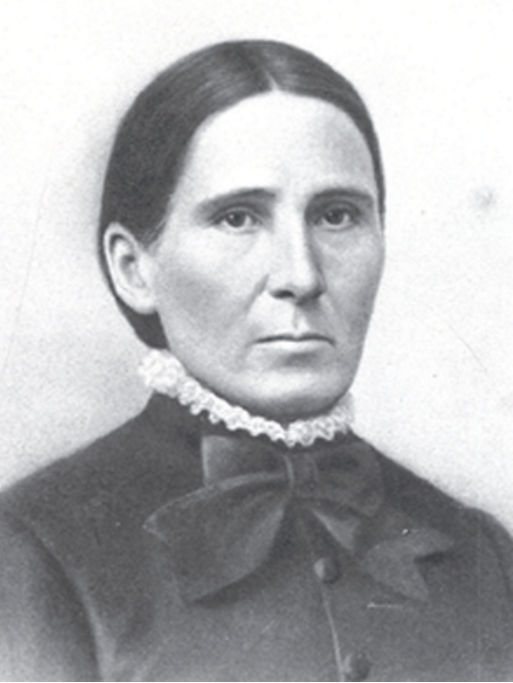

Board of Trustees, Brigham Young Academy
- October 1875 – December 14, 1881
- Called by: Brigham Young

Personal details
- Born: Marth Jane Knowlton; June 3, 1821; Covington, Kentucky, US
- Died: December 14, 1881 (aged 60); Provo, Utah Territory, US
- Notable works: History of Joseph Smith by His Mother
- Spouse(s): Howard Coray
- Children: Howard Knowlton Coray (b. 1842); Martha J. Knowlton Coray (b. 1844); Harriet Virginia Knowlton Coray (b. 1846); Mary Knowlton Coray (b. 1848); Euphrenia Serephia Coray (b. 1850); Helena Knowlton Coray (b. 1852); William Henry Coray (b. 1853); Sidney Algernon Coray (b. 1855); Wilford Coray (b. 1856); George Quincy Coray (b. 1857); Frances DeLaVan Coray (b. 1860); Louis Laville Coray (b. 1862); Don Silas Rathbone Coray (b. 1864)
- Parents: Sidney Algernon Knowlton; Harriet Burnham Knowlton

Martha Jane Knowlton Coray (June 3, 1821 – December 14, 1881) was an American Mormon pioneer, record keeper, and educator. She was the only female member of the first board of trustees of Brigham Young Academy. Born in Kentucky and raised in Ohio and Illinois, Coray converted to the Church of Jesus Christ of Latter-day Saints as a young woman and moved to the Mormon settlement of Nauvoo. There, she assisted Lucy Mack Smith, the mother of Joseph Smith (founder of the Latter-day Saint movement), in creating a biography of Joseph, later published under the title History of Joseph Smith by His Mother. After crossing the Great Plains alongside other Mormon pioneers, Coray settled in Utah Territory, homesteading in towns such as Tooele and Mona. She helped support her family financially through dairy production, home chemistry, and other crafts. Though she never received formal schooling, Coray studied various topics in her free time and sought to teach her children what she knew. She took an interest in law, becoming involved in local court disputes and political discussions. Towards the end of her life, in 1875, Coray was appointed a member of the first Brigham Young Academy Board of Trustees, the only woman to serve in this capacity at the time. While serving as trustee, she focused her efforts on encouraging education for young women and creating a curriculum of religious education for the academy. Today, the lecture hall in the Karl G. Maeser Building on Brigham Young University's campus bears Coray's name, and the university's 1997 homecoming celebrations honored her achievements.

== Early life ==
Martha Jane Knowlton Coray was born on June 3, 1821, in Covington, Kentucky. She was the third of ten children born to Sidney Algernon Knowlton and Harriett Burnham, who were from New England. Her ancestor Lt. Daniel Knowlton served in the American Revolutionary War. The Knowlton family moved around the Midwestern United States during Coray's childhood, living in towns such as Cumminsville, Ohio and Bear Creek, Illinois. She attended a Campbellite church as a child, and, at the age of ten, taught a Sunday School class of students older than she. Coray first encountered Mormonism while living in Hancock County, Illinois in 1838. Her father had offered work and housing to some of the Latter-day Saint refugees, and Coray began attending their religious meetings. She listened to many speakers, including George A. Smith, whose discourses convinced her to join the Church of Jesus Christ of Latter-day Saints. In January 1840, she was baptized by John E. Page in the freezing Mississippi River through a hole cut in the ice. Afterwards, Page performed her confirmation. Weeks later, on January 21, 1840, Joseph Smith Sr. gave Coray a patriarchal blessing, bestowing upon her the gift of tongues and the gift of prophecy. She was the first person in her family to join the LDS faith.

== Nauvoo years ==
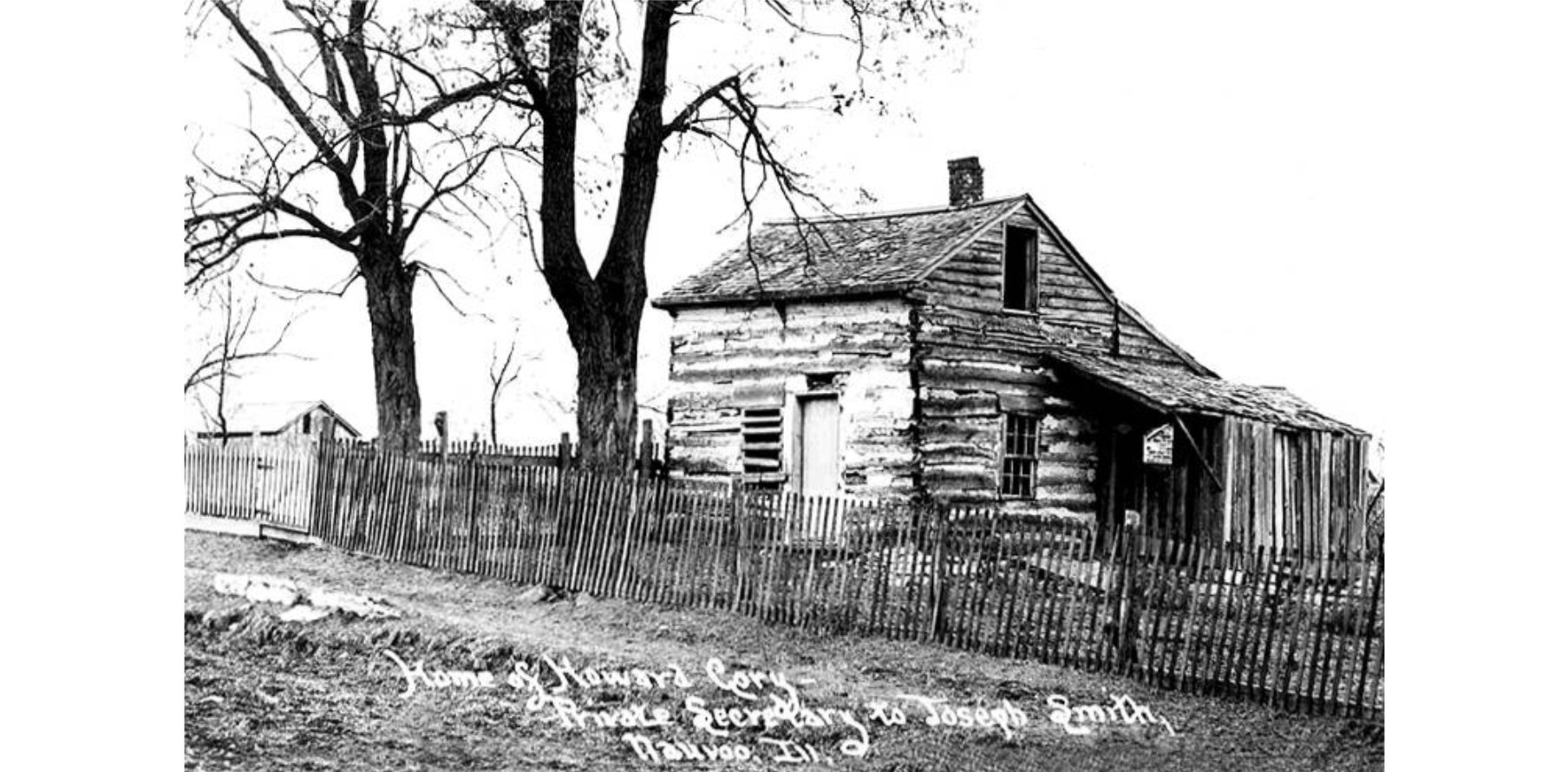
Martha and Howard Coray's home in Nauvoo, Illinois (ca. 1860s)

On February 6, 1841, she married Howard Coray in her father's house in Nauvoo, Illinois. Howard was twenty-four years old, and she was nineteen. Robert B. Thompson performed the marriage ceremony. The couple had first met at a church meeting and exchanged letters for a few months before their wedding. Of his first encounter with Martha Coray, Howard recorded in his journal that he "discovered at once [that] she was ready, off hand, and inclined to be witty." Joseph Smith, the founder of the Latter-day Saint movement, approved of the Corays' union. Martha Coray came to know Smith through her husband, who worked for Smith as a clerk. According to Howard, "she valued her acquaintance with him above everything else."

Sometime after her baptism in January 1840 and before her marriage in 1841, Coray began recording Joseph Smith's speeches in a small notebook she carried with her. At the time, there was no established manner of record keeping in the LDS Church. Coray had been documenting what she saw happening around her since the age of thirteen, and kept detailed records of her daily activities. Her daughter Martha Coray Lewis noted that her mother "preserved notes of sermons that would otherwise have been lost to the Church." While in Nauvoo, she recorded discourses by George A. Smith, Brigham Young, John Taylor and, Joseph Smith. Years later, while serving as historian of the church, Wilford Woodruff requested the notes Coray had taken during this time. Oftentimes, her husband would join her in transcribing Smith's speeches. The pair has been called "a team committed to meticulous documentation."

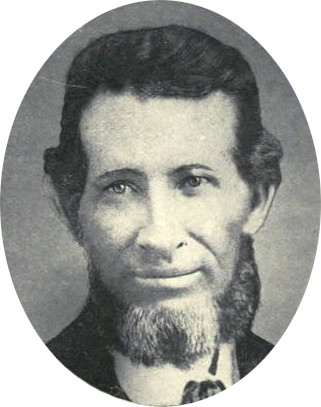
Martha's husband, Howard Coray

On July 22, 1843, Hyrum Smith privately taught the Corays about celestial marriage and the practice of plural marriage. This occurred before polygamy was officially announced by the church. Years later, Howard reported that, during a carriage ride, Hyrum had recited to them the exact wording of the "revelation on celestial marriage" as dictated by Joseph Smith. Howard also claimed that this conversation had been prompted by a dream Martha Coray had experienced in July 1843. He wrote that he was sealed to Martha shortly after the couple's discussion with Hyrum. Howard did not marry another wife until 1853, and that marriage ended in divorce two years later. In January 1846 Martha and Howard Coray entered the Nauvoo Temple to participate in the endowment ceremony and were resealed by Brigham Young. While living in Nauvoo, Martha Coray served as secretary of the Relief Society, the LDS Church's women's organization, and gave birth to her first child, Howard Knowlton Coray, on April 10, 1842.

During the early years of their marriage, the couple remained in Nauvoo and taught school together. They rented a room from Robert B. Thompson to use as a school and taught as many as 150 students at a time. As a teacher, she enjoyed exposing students to the subjects of "law, philosophy, history, poetry, chemistry, and geology". Coray worked in this capacity until 1844, when she was hired by Lucy Mack Smith to write a biography of her son, Joseph Smith.

=== Writing a history of Joseph Smith ===
Coray contributed to the preservation of the history of the LDS Church by writing the history of Joseph Smith as dictated by his mother, Lucy Mack Smith. Much of Coray's early work on this project involved transcribing Mack Smith's verbal narratives of her son's life. She listened to and recorded the stories regularly, editing them at the end of each day spent transcribing. Coray was able to find some information in letters and documents that concerned Smith, but most of the content of the biography came from the mouth of Mack Smith. The project often required daily effort. Researcher Elizabeth Anderson describes Coray's work on the biography as "a natural outgrowth of her deep admiration and love for the Prophet Joseph Smith." She wanted to preserve Smith's history so that her children would have access to it in the future. Coray felt that her earlier experience transcribing Smith's speeches had prepared her for her work on his biography. Howard Coray later joined his wife in this effort, and the final product was finished in 1845, after approximately a year of work. The Corays had two copies of the biography printed: one for Mack Smith, and one for the church's records.

There is some speculation as to who wrote the majority of the biography. Years after its completion, Brigham Young asserted that it was Martha Coray who spearheaded the project, but Howard Coray's sister argued that her brother had been the main author. The manuscript is written in both Howard and Martha Coray's handwriting, but the prose most often reflects Lucy Mack Smith's own style. Likewise, it is unclear whether the idea of writing the history was Coray's or Mack Smith's. It is known, however, that Coray had expressed the desire to produce a book of short stories from Smith's life to serve as a tool to teach children about him.

In 1853, Orson Pratt published copies of the work in England under the title "Biographical Sketches of Joseph Smith the Prophet, and His Progenitors for Many Generations". In Utah, the biography was recalled after Brigham Young and some LDS historians complained of its containing inaccuracies. Young, the president of the church at the time, was also angered that the publication of the work had occurred without his prior approval, and publicly criticized Coray's writing. While she was alive, Coray never gave permission for the work to be reprinted; but the biography was later published in the Improvement Era in 1903 and again in 1945. It was then entitled "History of the Prophet Joseph, by His Mother".

== Traveling Westward ==
In the spring of 1846, Martha Coray left Nauvoo, like the majority of the Latter-day Saints, to travel west. In order to obtain the means necessary to make the journey, the Coray family worked as government farmers and ferry boat tenders in various places in the Midwest, including Kanesville, Iowa; Fort Kearny; and along the banks of Missouri and the Nishnabotna Rivers. While living in these areas, they often assisted displaced Mormons from Missouri. The Corays also reportedly sold the windows and doors of their Nauvoo home for $10 before departing. They made the trek west to Utah Territory with the John Sharp company. Coray was twenty-seven years old, and had five children under the age of eight—her son Howard and daughters Martha, Harriet, Mary, and Euphrina—to tend to during the journey. She gave birth to three along the way. By the time the family arrived in the Salt Lake Valley in 1850, it consisted of six children.

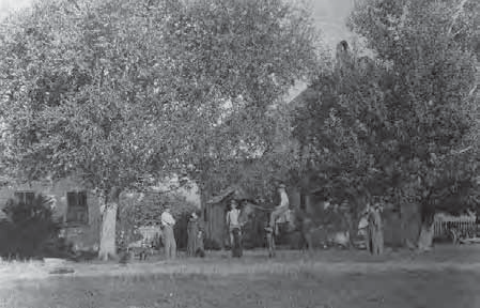
Martha and Howard Coray's farmhouse in Mona, Utah (ca. 1870s)

== Frontier life ==
The Corays' first residence in Utah was a house adjacent to the Salt Lake Theatre. Coray was a member of the Thirteenth Ward Relief Society in Salt Lake City, and served as the organization's first secretary. Then, in 1855, the family moved to Tooele, Utah, where Coray oversaw dairy production on their farm. Unsatisfied with life in Tooele, the Corays relocated, splitting their time between a house in Provo and a farm in Mona. With this move, Coray shifted her home industry focus from producing cheese to crafting soap and distilling ointments. Her soap production served as the family's contribution to the United Order, an initiative pushing towards Latter-day Saint self-sufficiency. Financial difficulties often plagued the Coray family, and, during times of famine, Martha Coray would feed her children watercress, lilies, rabbit meat, and wild onions. She would also make candles of tallow, which the children would then sell to the community. Over the years, her role oscillated between frontierswoman and middle-class wife as the family's financial situation shifted. Coray stepped in to assist Howard financially whenever needed. Throughout her adult life, however, she had health issues, mainly a "persistent cough."

=== Home chemistry ===
When Brigham Young began to publicly suggest that women work outside the home, Coray joined other women in seeking new ventures and job opportunities. She had an interest in chemistry, and spent time concocting oils, shampoos, and other substances of her own formula. One such product was her "Lightening Cage Oil," which, she claimed, "would render [an assailant] helpless" when applied. In contrast, the sage oil she produced was used for medicinal purposes. The use of herbal medicine, such as the kind Coray made, was encouraged by LDS Church leaders at the time; it was, subsequently, popular in Coray's community. She established a sort of small business selling these homemade ointments and medicines along the Wasatch Front. Coray's home chemistry was "more than a hobby; she ... produced and marketed a viable medical product." She also took an interest in obstetrics after one of her daughters died in childbirth, and was skilled in assaying minerals. Another of her daughters later commented that chemistry and geology were Coray's favorite fields of study.

=== Education ===
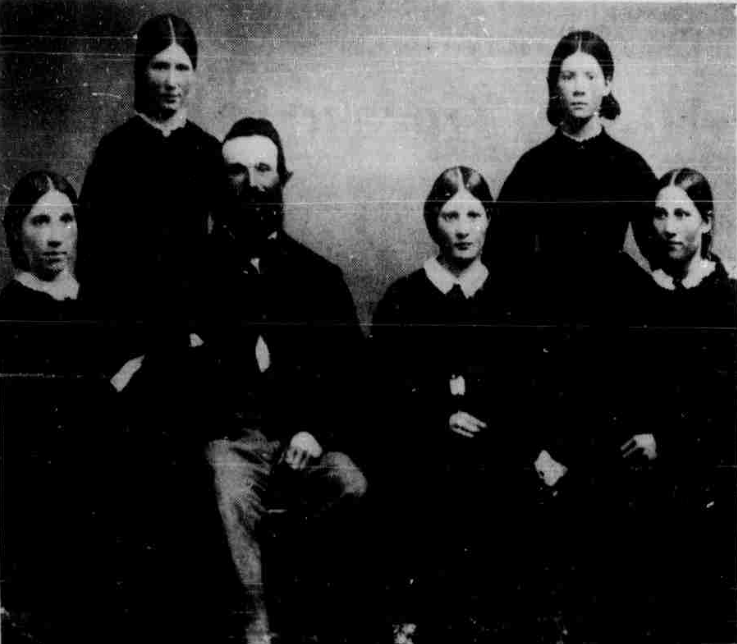
Coray (back left) with her husband, Howard, and four of her daughters: (from left) Euphrenia, Harriett, Helena, and Mary Coray (ca. 1860s)

Coray prioritized education in her home, and spearheaded the teaching of her children. In her journal, she recorded instructing them in reading, writing, grammar, and arithmetic regularly. Though the chores that supported the family financially always came first, Coray had an "unusual dedication to education." She tried to balance the duties of a wife and mother with personal educational pursuits. She borrowed books from friends and attended classes on music and religion, taking an interest in biblical studies. Though she never received formal schooling herself, she taught school multiple times throughout her life. While her husband, Howard, was serving as a Latter-day Saint missionary, Coray stood in for him in his teaching position at the University of Deseret (now the University of Utah). She also taught Sunday School and served on the local LDS Sunday School Board. Her son George went on to attend Cornell University and later became a professor at the University of Utah, and her daughter Martha Jane Coray Lewis became a writer. Towards the end of her life, her grown children moved to Mona to build homes for their own families on the Coray property and live there.

=== Law and politics ===
Once her children were grown and more free time became available to her, Coray became involved in Utah politics. Her priority was helping the Latter-day Saints maintain their autonomy in Utah Territory, and she contributed to this effort by producing homemade liniments and health products, as well as establishing a Latter-day Saint-operated school; financial support for educational institutions in Utah Territory at the time was not well-established or stable. Coray had her own income, voted in local elections, and owned land. Because the Salt Lake City Land Office required that landowners live on their property, the Corays transferred their Provo home to Martha's name in order to maintain both that property and their farm in Mona. Coray also worked as the representative for the Woman's Exponent, an LDS woman's publication, in Nephi and Mona; she sold subscriptions and subscribed herself. In addition to the histories she recorded throughout her life, Coray wrote pieces on women's rights, and some of her writing was published in the Exponent.

Coray also took an interest in law. On multiple occasions, she inquired after patenting some of her homemade products and production methods. She also advised friends and neighbors on legal matters, often holding power of attorney for them and appearing in court. She took charge of legal matters for the irrigation efforts in Juab County, Utah, which became the Mona Irrigation District. Coray never attended law school or received formal legal training of any kind, but her participation in legal matters regardless was in line with convention in Utah at the time. Her legal knowledge came in handy when family members endeavored to start businesses or purchase land. Her daughter Martha described her as "a rapid and lucid writer, a brilliant conversationalist, and a fine speaker on a wide range of subjects," including history, philosophy, poetry, and law.

== Brigham Young Academy ==
During the founding of the LDS Church's educational system, Brigham Young had instituted a rule that each academy board include at least one woman. Coray was selected by Young in October 1875 to serve as the first woman on the board of trustees of Brigham Young Academy (BYA). She served in this capacity until her death in 1881. She was also appointed the first Dean of Women at Brigham Young Academy. Coray took it upon herself, even before her appointment, to keep Young (the president of the LDS Church and governor of Utah Territory at the time) apprised of the issues surrounding education for Utah women. Likewise, in her capacity as board member, Coray was tasked by Young to focus her efforts on ensuring that young women attended the academy. Her objective was "to act as a mouthpiece for their interests."

The first board of trustees of BYA focused its efforts on creating curriculum. Coray worked alongside her colleagues to balance secular and theological teachings in this endeavor. Her philosophy on education was that the combination of religious and secular learning would result in the best education possible. In a letter to Brigham Young, she declared: "My principle of education has been God's laws of religion first, Man's laws of honor and morality second, [and] Science of every attainable kind [third]". Her efforts while at BYA also included hiring Warren Newton Dusenberry and Karl G. Maeser. She was on the executive committee, the committee for rules and by-laws, and the auditing committee at BYA. Throughout her time at the academy, Coray wrote many letters to Brigham Young, keeping him updated on subjects such as enrollment and curriculum.

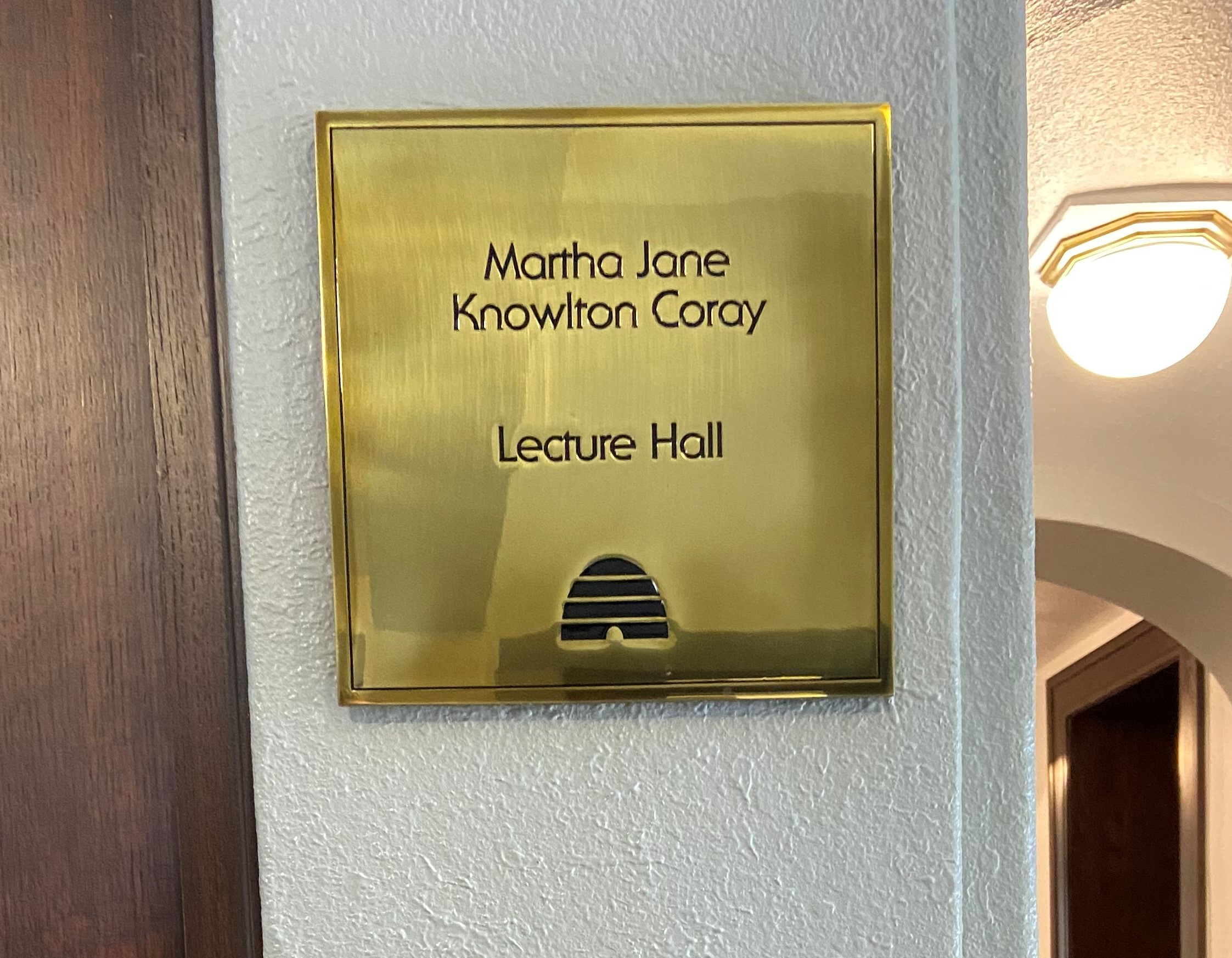
Plaque outside the Martha Jane Knowlton Coray lecture hall in the Karl G. Maeser Building on Brigham Young University's campus

While serving as trustee, she wrote: "I am a little disappointed at the want of general interest shown in the B. Y. Academy at Provo. I am now so situated that I can give considerable attention to its workings and its struggling also to accomplish the greatest good, with the smallest amount of means". When she died, many BYA students attended her funeral.

== Legacy ==
Martha Jane Knowlton Coray died on December 14, 1881, in Provo, Utah at the age of 59. She is buried in the Provo City Cemetery. Her funeral was held in the Provo Tabernacle on December 25, 1881. Speakers included Joseph F. Smith, Abraham O. Smoot, and Wilford Woodruff, then president of the LDS Church. A crowd of hundreds gathered at her funeral service. Her husband, Howard, and eleven of her children survived her. As of 1908, she had 50 grandchildren and 45 great-grandchildren.

Through her efforts as a member of the board of trustees at Brigham Young Academy, she helped define LDS religious education, a concept still in force today through the Church Educational System. Coray also helped promote education for women in Utah. The lecture hall in the Karl G. Maeser Building on Brigham Young University (BYU) campus is dedicated to and named after Coray. Additionally, BYU's homecoming in 1997 celebrated Coray for her commitment to education. She was also dedicated to her faith; it influenced almost every aspect of her life. She was described as "a devout member of the Church and a competent writer," as well as "a woman of native brilliance and intense dedication."
