= James Sloan (Latter Day Saints) =

James Sloan (October 28, 1792 – October 24, 1886) was an official historian and recorder of the Church of Jesus Christ of Latter Day Saints, a secretary to Joseph Smith, and one of the first Mormon settlers in Nauvoo, Illinois.

Sloan was born in County Tyrone, Ireland. In the mid-1830s, he became a member of the Church of Jesus Christ of Latter Day Saints and emigrated to the United States. On February 18, 1838, Sloan was ordained a high priest by Joseph Smith, Sr. In 1840, he became one of the first Latter Day Saints to settle in Hancock County, Illinois, in what would later be called the city of Nauvoo. On February 1, 1840, Sloan was appointed to be the first city recorder in Nauvoo's history and the first clerk of the Nauvoo Court. In September 1842, Sloan was elected Nauvoo's first notary public.

In 1841 and 1842, Sloan was an official historian and recorder of the church and from 1840 to 1843 he served as a scribe to President of the Church Joseph Smith and Assistant President of the Church Hyrum Smith. He is one of many writers whose work was collected into the LDS Church's official early history, History of the Church.

In May 1843 Sloan traveled to Ireland as a church missionary. While on his mission, he was selected to preside over the Irish Conference and later the Bradford Conference of the church.

Upon returning to America, Sloan settled in Pottawattamie County, Iowa. While in Pottawattamie County Sloan served as the first county clerk and in 1851 he was elected District Judge for that county. After 1851, he traveled to Utah Territory as a Mormon pioneer to join the main gathering of Latter-day Saints.

Later in his life, Sloan left the Church of Jesus Christ of Latter-day Saints and became a member of the Reorganized Church of Jesus Christ of Latter Day Saints. Sloan emigrated to California and died in Sacramento, just four days short of his 94th birthday.
