= Latter-day Saint Biographical Encyclopedia =

Book by Andrew Jenson

Latter-day Saint Biographical Encyclopedia: A Compilation of Biographical Sketches of Prominent Men and Women in the Church of Jesus Christ of Latter-day Saints
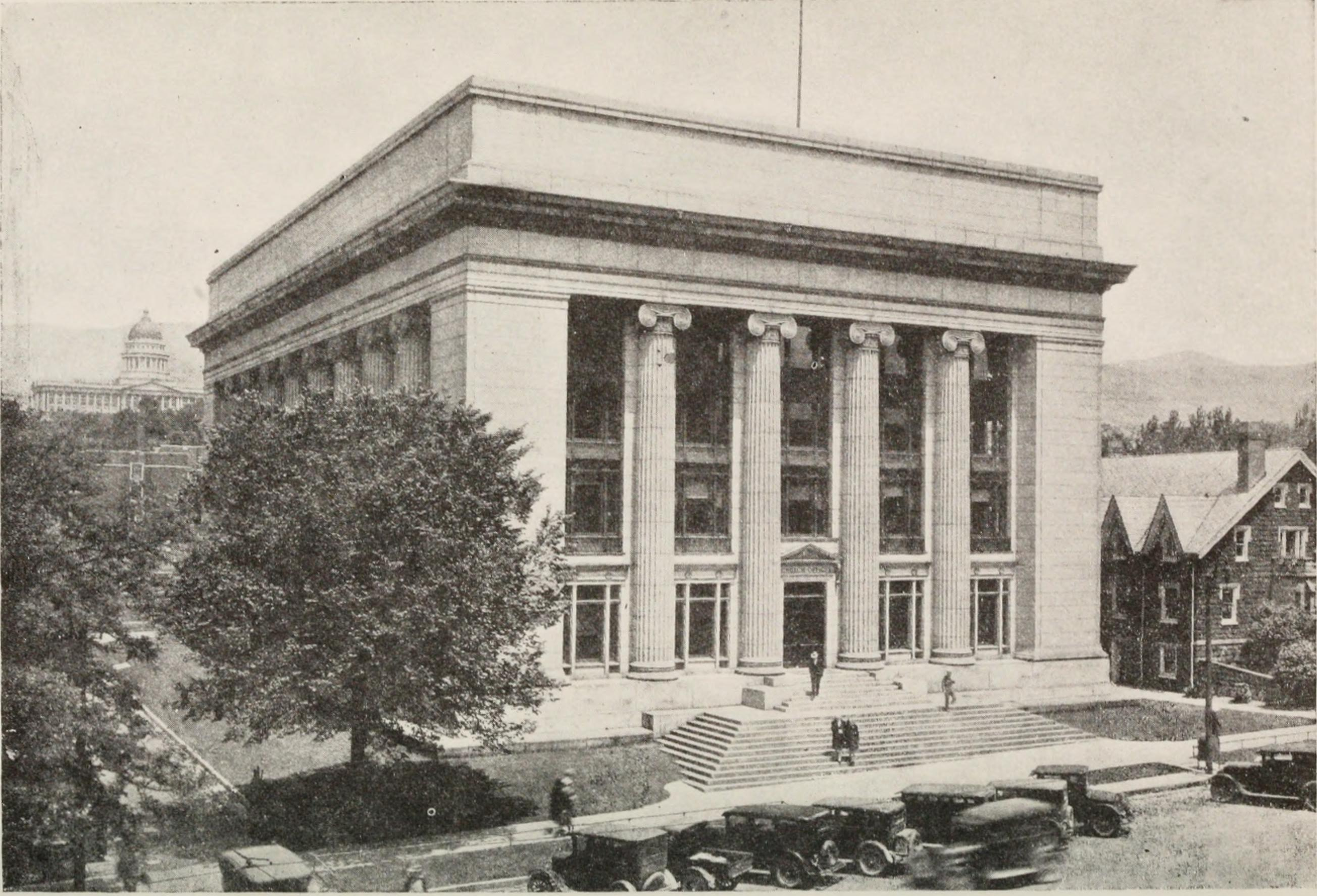
- The Church office building in which the Latter-day Saint Biographical Encyclopedia Vol. IV. was written.
- Author: Andrew Jenson
- Language: English
- Subject: LDS Church history and biography
- Publisher: Andrew Jenson History Company; Deseret News Press
- Publication date: 1901–36
- Publication place: Salt Lake City, Utah, United States

Latter-day Saint Biographical Encyclopedia: A Compilation of Biographical Sketches of Prominent Men and Women in the Church of Jesus Christ of Latter-day Saints (abbreviated LDS Biographical Encyclopedia) is a four-volume biographical dictionary by Andrew Jenson that includes a church chronology and biographical information about leaders and other prominent members of the Church of Jesus Christ of Latter-day Saints (LDS Church) from its founding in 1830 until 1930.

The Encyclopedia was not an official publication of the LDS Church, but Jenson completed the work during his time as an Assistant Church Historian and it is largely hagiographic. The work was printed by the church-owned Deseret News Press and every stake and ward of the church was provided with free copies for use in meetinghouse libraries.

Volume 1 was published in 1901. It was Jenson's original intention that the project would consist of only one volume and that it would contain information on the church and its people from 1830 to the end of the 19th century. However, he later decided to complete the work for the first 100 years of church history, which resulted in the publication of volume 2 in 1914, volume 3 in 1920, and volume 4 in 1936. In total, the four volumes contain over 5000 biographical articles and 2000 photographs.

In 1941, the four volumes were updated and re-published in a second edition. In 2003, Greg Kofford Books began reprinting the volumes.

== See also ==
- Comprehensive History of the Church of Jesus Christ of Latter-day Saints, a history of the LDS Church from 1830 to 1930
