= Preston Nibley =

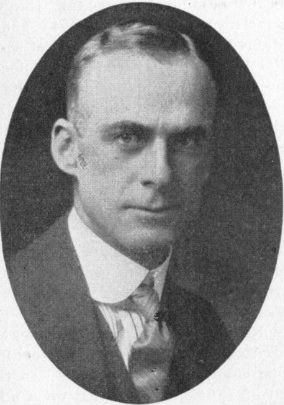
- Nibley, ca. 1920

Personal details
- Born: May 26, 1884; Logan, Utah Territory, United States
- Died: January 2, 1966 (aged 81); Salt Lake City, Utah, United States
- Resting place: Logan City Cemetery; 41.7485°N 111.8045°W

Preston Nibley (May 26, 1884 – January 2, 1966) was an American religious leader in the Church of Jesus Christ of Latter-day Saints (LDS Church), and wrote several books on the church, including several pieces of devotional literature.

== Biography ==
Nibley was a son of Charles W. Nibley and one of his wives, Ellen Ricks. Nibley was born in Logan, Utah Territory. From 1903 to 1906, he served as a LDS Church missionary in the German Empire, including eighteen months as president of the Berlin Conference.

Nibley accompanied Joseph F. Smith on his 1906 trip to Nauvoo, Illinois, where Smith told him of having seen one of the Joseph Smith Papyri rolled out in the Mansion House.

From 1906 to 1907, Nibley was a student at the University of Chicago. He then returned to Logan, Utah, and in 1908 he married Anna Parkinson, with whom he had three children. They moved to Salt Lake City in 1911, where he became involved in real estate and manufacturing.

Nibley served as corresponding secretary of the Utah State Historical Society around 1920.

=== Church service ===
In 1919, Nibley was appointed as a member of the general board of the church's Young Men's Mutual Improvement Association.

From 1937 to 1940, Nibley served as president of the Northwestern States Mission. Shortly after becoming mission president in 1937, he counseled LDS Church members in Eugene, Oregon, to begin building a chapel. Nibley was succeeded as mission president by Nicholas G. Smith.

During 1957 to 1963, Nibley served as an Assistant Church Historian under Joseph Fielding Smith. He had a desk in the Church Office Building more than ten years prior to 1957, where he was involved in aspects of LDS Church history.

== Published work ==
In 1936, Nibley published Brigham Young: The Man and His Work. In 1943, he published a collection of Mormon missionary experiences, in 1946, he published a biography of Joseph Smith Junior entitled `Joseph Smith the Prophet', and in 1947, he published a collection of stories on the presidents of the LDS Church. He also edited and published an edition of Lucy Mack Smith's History of Joseph Smith.

Nibley compiled some of the writings and sermons of George Albert Smith which were then published under the title Sharing the Gospel with Others. In 1953, Bookcraft published his L.D.S. Adventure Stories and Deseret Book published The Witnesses of the Book of Mormon. In 1957, he published L.D.S. Stories of Faith and Courage.

== Sources ==
- Friends of the HBLL item mentioning Preston Nibley
- J. Spencer Cornwall. Stories of Our Mormon Hymns, p. 58.
- history of The Church of Jesus Christ of Latter-day Saints in Eugene, Oregon
