= Robert B. Thompson =

American journalist

Robert Blashel Thompson (October 1, 1811 – August 27, 1841) was an English-American associate of Joseph Smith Jr., a leader in the Latter Day Saint movement, a Danite, and an official historian of the Church of Jesus Christ of Latter Day Saints.

== Early life ==
Thompson was born in Great Driffield, England, on October 1, 1811. He joined the Methodists at an early age and participated in preaching in Yorkshire. In 1834, Thompson emigrated to Upper Canada and settled in Toronto. In May 1836, he was baptized a member of the Church of the Latter-day Saints by Parley P. Pratt. On July 22, 1836, Thompson was ordained an elder in the church by John Taylor.

== Life in the United States ==
=== Personal life ===
Thompson moved to Kirtland, Ohio, where the majority of Latter Day Saints were gathering, in May 1837. He married Mercy Rachel Fielding in Kirtland on June 4, 1837. Later that month, the couple traveled to Upper Canada as missionaries for the church. They returned to Kirtland in March 1838. They had one child, Mary Jane Thompson. The Thompsons traveled to Far West, Missouri with the family of Hyrum Smith in May 1838.

=== Latter Day Saint movement ===
While in Missouri, Thompson was a Danite and participated in the 1838 Mormon War. He was standing next to apostle David W. Patten when Patten was killed at the Battle of Crooked River.

In March 1839, Thompson was the clerk to the disciplinary council convened by Brigham Young that excommunicated a number of prominent Latter Day Saints, including George M. Hinkle, Sampson Avard, John Corrill, W. W. Phelps, Frederick G. Williams, Thomas B. Marsh, and others. At a conference of the church in May 1839, Thompson, Almon W. Babbitt and Erastus Snow were appointed to be a traveling committee that was charged with "gather[ing] up and obtain[ing] all the libelous reports and publications which had been circulated against the Church."

When the Latter Day Saints were forced to leave Missouri, Thompson moved to Quincy, Illinois. He then moved to Nauvoo, Illinois, where he worked as a scribe for Joseph Smith.

On September 15, 1840, Thompson delivered the funeral oration at the funeral of Joseph Smith Sr., the presiding patriarch of the church. In October 1840, Thompson succeeded Elias Higbee as official Church Historian, and in November of that year, Thompson and Higbee together drafted a petition to the United States Congress for redress of the grievances of the Latter Day Saints from their experiences in Missouri.

Thompson was a colonel and an aide-de-camp in the Nauvoo Legion.

=== Death ===
He became Associate Editor of the Times and Seasons newspaper in Nauvoo. Due to the unhealthy conditions in the offices of the Times and Seasons, Thompson and Don Carlos Smith both died from pneumonia in August 1841. He was survived by his wife and daughter and was buried at the Smith Family Cemetery in Nauvoo.

Thompson wrote the words to a hymn called "See, the Mighty Angel Flying", which is included in the 1985 English-language LDS Church hymnal as hymn number 330.

== See also ==
- Joseph Smith
