= Saints: The Story of the Church of Jesus Christ in the Latter Days =

Book series published by the LDS Church

- Language: English
- Subject: The Church of Jesus Christ of Latter-day Saints, Church history, Joseph Smith
- Genre: History
- Publisher: The Church of Jesus Christ of Latter-day Saints
- Publication date: September 4, 2018 (Vol. 1); February 12, 2020 (Vol. 2); April 22, 2022 (Vol. 3); October 29, 2024 (Vol. 4)
- Publication place: United States
- Media type: Print (softcover, hardcover), Digital
- Pages: 699 (Vol. 1); 833 (Vol. 2); 757 (Vol. 3); 831 (Vol. 4)
- ISBN: 9781629724928
- OCLC: 1029775588
- Preceded by: Comprehensive History of The Church of Jesus Christ of Latter-day Saints (1930)

Saints: The Story of the Church of Jesus Christ in the Latter Days is a four-volume history of the Church of Jesus Christ of Latter-day Saints (LDS Church), published from 2018 to 2024. It was the first official history published by the LDS Church since general authority B. H. Roberts put together his six-volume chronicle, Comprehensive History of The Church of Jesus Christ of Latter-day Saints.

Steven E. Snow is credited with the production and introduction of this new, narrative history of the LDS Church. The first volume of Saints was initially published in fourteen languages and made available as a free digital book. It was written by a team of six writers, edited by another team, and reviewed by several historians for accuracy. The first volume was published in September 2018 and sold a reported 340,000 copies; the second volume followed in February 2020. The first volume tackles sensitive topics, "A nearly 600-page book that covers early church history from 1815–1846 doesn't dwell on polygamy, but doesn't entirely skip over it either."

== Summary of volumes ==
The titles given to the volumes individually each draw from a famed passage in Joseph Smith's Wentworth letter known as "The Standard of Truth".

- Volume 1: The Standard of Truth, 1815–1846 (published September 4, 2018)

Beginning with the childhood of Joseph Smith and ending with the Mormon exodus from Nauvoo, Illinois.

- Volume 2: No Unhallowed Hand, 1846–1893 (published February 12, 2020)

Beginning with the Mormon exodus from Nauvoo, Illinois, and tracing the history of the church through to the dedication of the Salt Lake Temple in 1893.

- Volume 3: Boldly, Nobly, and Independent, 1893–1955 (published April 22, 2022)

Beginning with the Tabernacle Choir's performance at the 1893 World's Columbian Exposition and ending with the dedication of the Bern Switzerland Temple, in 1955.

- Volume 4: Sounded in Every Ear, 1955–2020 (published October 29, 2024)
