= Church Historian and Recorder =

Priesthood calling in The Church of Jesus Christ of Latter-day Saints

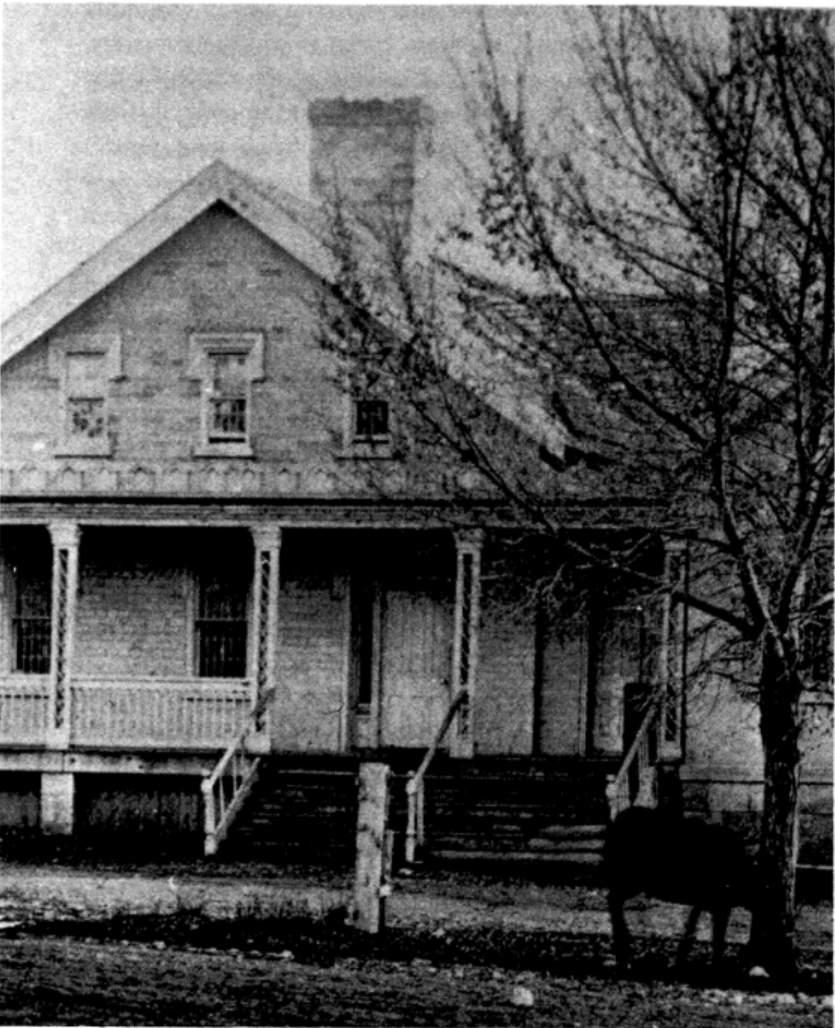
Church Historians office ca 1875, across the street from Brigham Young's home, the Beehive House

Church Historian and Recorder (usually shortened to Church Historian) is a priesthood calling in the Church of Jesus Christ of Latter-day Saints. The role of the Church Historian and Recorder is to keep an accurate and comprehensive record of the church and its activities. His office gathers history sources and preserves records, ordinances, minutes, revelations, procedures, and other documents. The Church Historian and Recorder also chairs the Historic Sites Committee and Records Management Committee, and may act as an authoritative voice of the church in historical matters.

== History ==
This office is based on revelations to Joseph Smith calling for keeping records and preparing a church history. Oliver Cowdery, the first in this position, originally recorded meeting minutes, patriarchal blessings, membership information, priesthood ordinations, and a kind of narrative church history. For a time, the callings of Church Historian and Church Recorder were separate, but in 1842 these callings were merged and now the Church Historian also acts as the Church Recorder.

In 1972, the Church Historian's Office was renamed to become the Historical Department. In 2000, this department was merged with the Family History Department to become the Family and Church History Department. On March 12, 2008, the Church Historian separated again from the Family History Department to become the Church History Department.

While the majority of Church Historians and Recorders have been general authorities of the church, there have been some exceptions to the practice.

== Chronology ==
In the following tables, general authorities are listed in bold. The date ranges span from the sustaining date to the release date unless otherwise indicated.

=== Church Historian and Church Recorder ===
Date range	Church Historian	Church Recorder	Notes
1830-31	**Oliver Cowdery**		Although Cowdery did not receive an official call to be Church Historian, he was Joseph Smith's scribe and was appointed to keep minutes and records in an early conference. Therefore, he is widely regarded as the first unofficial Church Historian and Recorder.
1831-35	John Whitmer		Whitmer was called to be the Church Historian by a revelation to Smith, which is now Doctrine and Covenants section 47. He was the first official historian of the Latter Day Saint church.
1835-37	John Whitmer	**Oliver Cowdery**	Beginning in 1835, a new calling of "Recorder for the Church" was created, with Oliver Cowdery being the first appointee.
1837-38	John Whitmer	George W. Robinson	Robinson was sustained "as General Clerk & recorder of the whole Church" to replace Cowdery.
1838	**John Corrill**	George W. Robinson	Corrill and Higbee were both called to this position at the same time. Corrill apostatized from the church later that year and was excommunicated in March 1839.
1838–40	Elias Higbee	George W. Robinson	It is assumed that Robinson was released on 3 October 1840 since his replacement, Robert B. Thompson, was sustained that day.
1840–41	Elias Higbee	Robert B. Thompson	
1841–42	Elias Higbee	James Sloan	When Sloan was sustained his position was given as "General Church Clerk."
1842–43	**Willard Richards**	James Sloan	Richards was appointed as Joseph Smith's private secretary and Church Historian in late 1842.

=== Church Historian and Recorder ===
No.	Date range	Church Historian and Recorder	Assistant(s)			Notes
1	30 July 1843 – 11 March 1854	**Willard Richards**	office not yet created			In 1843, the callings of Church Historian and Church Recorder were merged when Richards, already serving as Church Historian, was appointed Church Recorder. Although, he wasn't sustained by the general church membership until 1845. Thomas Bullock was Richards' assistant (as was Charles Wesley Wandell), but the Assistant Church Historian priesthood calling wasn't given until Wilford Woodruff.
2	7 April 1854 – 8 October 1870	**George A. Smith**	**Wilford Woodruff** (1856–1881)			Woodruff was the first Assistant Church Historian.
3	8 October 1870 – 9 May 1874	**Albert Carrington**	**Wilford Woodruff** (1856–1881)			
4	9 May 1874 – 3 October 1881	**Orson Pratt**	**Wilford Woodruff** (1856–1881)			
	1881–83	**Wilford Woodruff** (Acting)				After Pratt's death in 1881, no official Church Historian was chosen, but Pratt's assistant Woodruff acted as Church Historian until he was formally selected as such.
5	7 October 1883 – 7 April 1889	**Wilford Woodruff**	**Franklin D. Richards** (1884–1889)			
6	7 April 1889 – 9 December 1899	**Franklin D. Richards**	John Jaques (1889–1900); Charles W. Penrose (1896–1904); Andrew Jenson (1897–1941)	Jenson Jaques	Penrose	Penrose became a general authority when released as an Assistant.
	1899–1900	Andrew Jenson and John Jaques (Acting)		Jenson Jaques		After the death of Richards on December 9, 1899, no Church Historian was chosen until July 26, 1900.
7	7 October 1900 – 2 March 1921	**Anthon H. Lund**	Charles W. Penrose (until 1904); Andrew Jenson; Orson F. Whitney (1902–1906); A. Milton Musser (1902–1909); **B. H. Roberts** (1902–1933); **Joseph Fielding Smith** (1906–1921); A. William Lund (1911–1971)	Jenson Roberts Lund	Penrose Whitney Musser Smith	Whitney became a general authority when released as an Assistant. Smith became a general authority in 1910, during Lund's tenure.
8	6 April 1921 – 23 January 1970	**Joseph Fielding Smith**	Andrew Jenson (until 1941); **B. H. Roberts** (until 1933); A. William Lund; Junius F. Wells (1921–1930); Preston Nibley (1957–1963); E. Earl Olson (1965–1972)	Jenson Roberts Lund	Nibley	Smith's tenure as Church Historian and Recorder is by far the longest in church history. He was released when he was called as President of the Church.
9	6 April 1970 – 1972	**Howard W. Hunter**	A. William Lund (until 1971); E. Earl Olson	Jenson Roberts Lund		

== Church Historical Department ==
In 1972, the Church Historian's Office was renamed to become the Historical Department. In 2000, this department was merged with the Family History Department to become the Family and Church History Department. On March 12, 2008, the Church Historian separated again from the Family History Department to become the Church History Department.

No.	Date range	Church Historian and Recorder	Assistant	Notes
10	6 April 1972 – February 1982	Leonard J. Arrington	Davis Bitton; James B. Allen (1972–1979)	Arrington was the first non-general authority Church Historian since 1842 and the first to simply be Church Historian, instead of Church Historian and Recorder, since Willard Richards. He was also the first in the position to be a professional historian. Arrington is reported to have lost the title of Church Historian in 1978, though he was formally released in 1982.
11	February 1982 – 10 January 1985	G. Homer Durham		Durham became Church Historian without formal public pronouncement by the church nor sustaining by the general church membership. Although, it was mentioned as an aside in General Conference. Some claim his tenure as Historian began when Arrington lost the title in 1978, or when Durham became Managing Director of the church Historical Department.
12	6 April 1985 – 4 October 1997	Dean L. Larsen		Larsen was also the first Executive Director of the Historical Department, in which he was replaced by John K. Carmack in 1989. Larsen then moved on to other assignments, such as serving in the Temple Department and Area Presidencies and was not active in any historical role, though technically he was still the Church Historian until his release in 1997.

=== Executive Director of the Historical Department ===
Larsen was also the first Executive Director of the Historical Department, in which he was replaced by John K. Carmack in 1989. Larsen then moved on to other assignments, such as serving in the Temple Department and Area Presidencies and was not active in any historical role, though he was still technically the Church Historian until his release from the Seventy in 1997.

While holding the office of Church Historian, and afterward, others succeeded Larsen as Executive Directors of the Historical Department. During this time, these men stood in for the Church Historian and were sometimes referred to with that title.

No.	Dates	Executive Directors of the Historical Department	Notes
12b	1989–91	John K. Carmack	Carmack was given the position of the department's Executive Director, but he was not called as the Church Historian.
12c	1991–93	Loren C. Dunn	
12d	1993–96	Stephen D. Nadauld	
12e	1996–98	Marlin K. Jensen	During this time (1997), Larsen was finally officially released as Church Historian, and the office was left unfilled.
12f	1998–99	John K. Carmack	
12g	1999–2000	Loren C. Dunn	
12h	2000–04	D. Todd Christofferson	Organizational changes during this time changed Christofferson's title to the Executive Director of the Family and Church History Department.
12i	2004–05	Marlin K. Jensen	Jensen retained his position as Executive Director when he was called to be Church Historian in 2005. Since the office of Church Historian had been revived, after this time the Executive Director was no longer standing in as a substitute.

No.	Dates	Church Historian and Recorder	Assistant	Notes
13	2 April 2005 – 6 October 2012	Marlin K. Jensen	Richard E. Turley, Jr. (2008–2016)	In 2005, Jensen became the first Church Historian since 1997. He had been made Executive Director of the Historical Department the previous year, a position he also held in 1997 when Dean L. Larsen was released. Jensen later said he "really [didn't] know why the office went unfilled for a few years." Some of his accomplishments in this position are chronicled at Marlin K. Jensen: Church Historian.
14	6 October 2012 – 1 August 2019	Steven E. Snow	Richard E. Turley, Jr. (2008–2016) Reid L. Neilson (2015-2019)	On January 10, 2012, the church announced that Snow, who was serving in the Presidency of the Seventy, would succeed Jensen as Church Historian and Recorder later in the year. On August 1, 2012, Snow assumed the new role and was released from the Presidency of the Seventy, while Jensen was then designated as an emeritus general authority in October 2012. On April 10, 2019, the church announced that Snow would be released, effective August 1, 2019, and would be designated as an emeritus general authority in October 2019.
15	1 August 2019-1 August 2022	LeGrand R. Curtis Jr.		On April 10, 2019, the church announced that Curtis, who had been serving as an Assistant Executive Director of the Church History Department, would replace Steven E. Snow as Church Historian and Recorder, effective August 1, 2019. Snow will be released from full-time service and designated an emeritus general authority in October 2019. A Deseret News article published on August 3, 2022 confirmed the release of Curtis and the appointment of Kyle S. McKay to replace him.
16	1 August 2022-	Kyle S. McKay		A Deseret News article published on August 3, 2022 reported the release of Curtis and the appointment of McKay.

== See also ==
- Church Historian's Press
- Church History Library
