= A. Milton Musser =

Amos Milton Musser
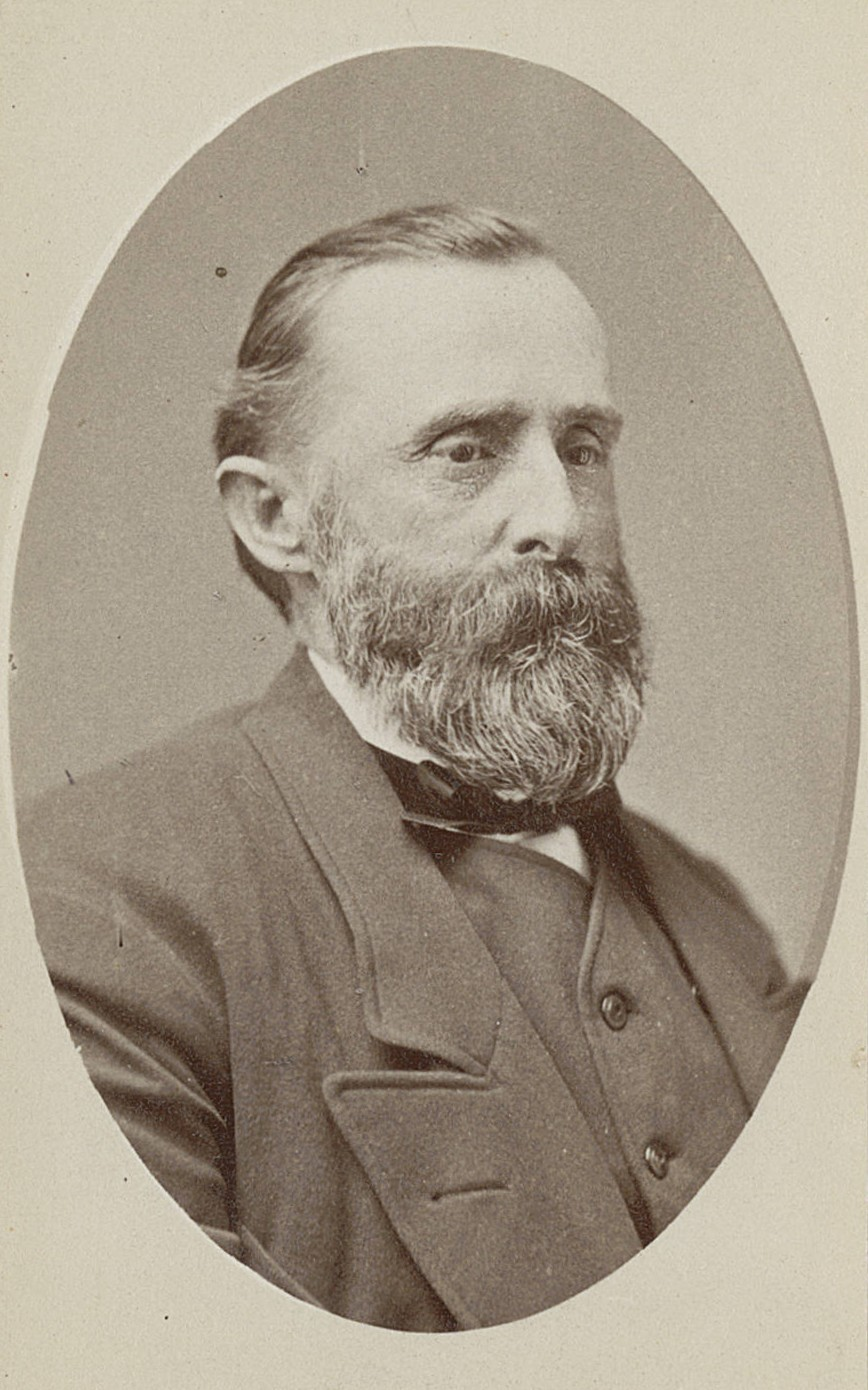
- A. Milton Musser in May 1873

Personal life
- Born: May 20, 1830 Donegal, Pennsylvania, United States
- Died: September 24, 1909 (aged 79) Salt Lake City, Utah, United States
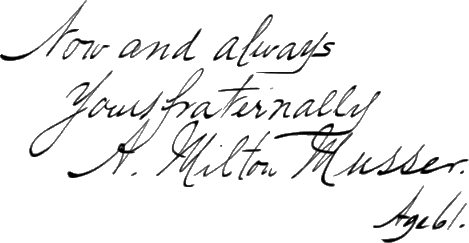
- Signature

Religious life
- Religion: The Church of Jesus Christ of Latter-day Saints

Amos Milton Musser (May 20, 1830 – September 24, 1909) was a Latter-day Saint pioneer who served in many church and community roles, including as an Assistant Church Historian of the Church of Jesus Christ of Latter-day Saints from 1902 until his death.

== Early life ==
Musser was born at Donegal, Lancaster County, Pennsylvania. Musser's father Samuel Musser died when he was two years old. The family moved to the vicinity of Quincy, Illinois in 1837. By this time his mother had remarried to Abraham Bitner. When Musser was about 16 he was in the Battle of Nauvoo and then was driven with his mother and siblings into Iowa. After he left Nauvoo Musser worked as a store clerk in Eddyville, Iowa. Musser was not baptized a member of The Church of Jesus Christ of Latter-day Saints until he arrived at Council Bluffs, Iowa in 1851.

== Church service ==
On arriving in Utah Territory in 1851 as part of the Easton Kelsey Company, Musser became a clerk in the tithing office. The following year Musser was among the early Latter-day Saint missionaries to travel to India. R. Lanier Britsch's book Nothing More Heroic on this early LDS Church mission in India was written as if narrated by Musser. After this mission he returned to Utah in the William G. Young Company of 1857.

From 1860 to 1876 Musser served as a traveling bishop in Utah. He was one of the most active traveling bishops and would visit all the major settlements in Utah at least twice a year.

In 1876, he was appointed assistant trustee-in-trust of the Church, a top ranking position in overseeing the assets and properties of the Church. Shortly after this he was sent on a mission to the eastern United States.

Musser had served for several years as a clerk in the Church Historians office prior to his appointment as Assistant Church Historian in 1902.

== Community service in Utah ==
Musser held several positions with the Deseret Agricultural and Manufacturing society. He was connected with the Utah Bee Association and the Utah Silk Association. Musser was one of the incorporators of Zion's Bank and Trust company. He was also involved with promoting several plans to build railroads. While serving as traveling bishop Musser served as the general superintendent of the Deseret Telegraph Company. Musser served as Fish and Game Commissioner of Utah Territory from the late 1870s through the early 1890s.

== Writer ==
Musser wrote many pro-Latter Day Saint pamphlets. He was also the editor of the Utah Farmer, an agricultural magazine, and The Palantic, a pro-Mormon literary magazine.

He wrote several pamphlets in defense of the faith of the Latter-day Saints. He authored "To The Press Of The United States" (Philadelphia, May 1877), a press release defending the faith in response to charges that the Latter-day Saints are a "blood-thirsty people" in newspaper coverage of the trial and execution of John D. Lee for his role in the Mountain Meadows Massacre.

== Polygamous marriages ==
Musser was a strong advocate of polygamy. He married his first wife Ann Leaver on January 31, 1858, then married Mary Elizabeth White in 1864, Belinda Marden Pratt (a daughter of Parley P. Pratt) in 1872, and Anna Seegmiller in 1874. Musser is the father of Joseph White Musser, who became a leader in the Mormon fundamentalist movement.

After a US law banning polygamy was passed in 1862, Musser was charged in 1885 with unlawful cohabitation (living with his plural wives), and he was sentenced to pay a fine of US$300 and to six months' imprisonment. Musser maintained that the anti-polygamy prosecutions "were instituted in malice and hypocrisy, or were based upon a gross misconception of the facts".

== Death and legacy ==
Musser died of "surgical shock" in Salt Lake City, Utah at age 79.

The community of Milton in Morgan County, Utah was named for A. Milton Musser.
