= George W. Robinson =

- Born: George Washington Robinson; May 14, 1814; Pawlet, Rutland County, Vermont
- Died: February 10, 1878 (age 63)
- Occupations: church elder, clerk, secretary, recorder, postmaster, banker
- Employer(s): Church of Jesus Christ of Latter Day Saints, self-employed
- Known for: Being an early Latter Day Saints Church father in the 1830s-1840s
- Spouse: Athalia Rigdon
- Relatives: Sidney Rigdon (father-in-law)
- Military career
- Allegiance: Church of Jesus Christ of Latter Day Saints
- Branch: Mormon militia
- Service years: 1838
- Unit: Mormon Danites
- Commands: Mormon Danites commander
- Conflicts: Missouri Mormon War: Battle of Crooked River (1838)

George Washington Robinson (May 14, 1814 – February 10, 1878) was a leader during the early history of the Latter Day Saint movement being the first secretary to the First Presidency of the Church of Jesus Christ of Latter Day Saints. He was also a Danite leader and an official church recorder in the 1830s and was a member of the Quorum of the Twelve Apostles in the Rigdonite church established in 1845.

== Early life ==
George Washington Robinson was born in Pawlet, Rutland County, Vermont.

== Mormon convert ==
=== Church elder ===
George W. Robinson became the son-in-law to prominent Latter Day Saint leader Sidney Rigdon, having married Athalia Rigdon in 1837. Robinson also became the recorder of the church in 1837. During the Missouri Mormon War in 1838 Robinson became a leader of the Danites helping to protect Mormon settlers from and fight anti-Mormon forces. On April 6, 1838, Robinson was appointed the first clerk or secretary to the church's First Presidency, having previously served as the clerk and recorder of the Kirtland high council. Robinson was imprisoned in Liberty Jail with Joseph Smith at Liberty, Missouri for a period of time.

=== Nauvoo ===
In 1839, George Robinson became the first postmaster in Commerce, Illinois, which was later renamed Nauvoo. Robinson was released from his recorder and secretarial duties in 1840 when he moved from Nauvoo across the Mississippi River to Iowa.

=== Disaffection with Church leadership ===
In 1842, Robinson became disaffected with the leadership of Joseph Smith. During the 1844 succession crisis, Robinson supported the leadership aspirations of his father-in-law Sidney Rigdon. In 1845, when Rigdon created a rival church to the church led by Brigham Young, Robinson was selected as a member of the Rigdonite Quorum of the Twelve Apostles.

== Post-Mormon years ==
In 1847, Robinson followed the advice of Rigdon and moved from Nauvoo to Friendship, New York, where in 1864 he founded the First National Bank.
