= Cornelius P. Lott =

American LDS leader (1798–1850)

Cornelius Peter Lott
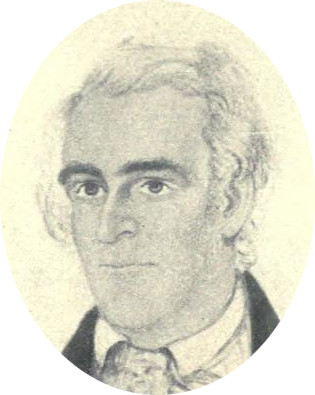

Personal details
- Born: September 22, 1798 New York City, United States
- Died: July 6, 1850 (aged 51) Salt Lake City, Utah, United States
- Resting place: Salt Lake City Cemetery; 40.777°N 111.858°W

Cornelius Peter Lott (September 22, 1798 – July 6, 1850) was an early member of the Latter Day Saint movement, father of one of Joseph Smith's plural wives, a member of the Council of Fifty and a Danite leader.

== Early life and marriage ==
Lott was born in New York City, to Peter Lott and Mary Jane Smiley. His grandfather, also named Cornelius Lott, was sheriff of Somerset County, New Jersey, and served as captain of the Middlesex County Men in the American Revolution.

Lott married Permelia Darrow on April 27, 1823. Sometime before 1834, both joined the Church of Christ (renamed Church of Jesus Christ of Latter Day Saints in 1838). They moved to Kirtland, Ohio, in 1836. He later took on additional, plural wives as well.

== Missouri ==
In 1838, the Lotts moved to Missouri and settled near Haun's Mill. During the 1838 Independence Day celebrations in Far West, Missouri, the military band passed in review of three men acting as Generals: Lott, Jared Carter, and Sampson Avard. Lott was involved with a rogue band of Mormons called "Danites", and during the 1838 Mormon War he led a Danite raid against a farm near Adam-ondi-Ahman. The farm had been harboring weapons and ammunition for a Missouri mob.

== Nauvoo ==
In the winter of 1838–39, the Lotts were driven from Missouri with the rest of the Latter Day Saints. They settled in Pike County, Illinois, forty miles south of the main body of Saints in Nauvoo, in 1839, before moving to Joseph Smith's farm just southeast of Nauvoo.

Once in Nauvoo, Lott took over management of Smith's farm and purchased some adjacent land, on which he built an eight-room farmhouse. While there, he served as a captain of Smith's bodyguard and received his endowment with W.W. Phelps and Joseph Fielding. In addition, Joseph Smith proposed marriage to Lott's daughter, Melissa.

Years later, Joseph Smith III, who was a boy at the time, recalled that the "rather old" Lott (then in his mid-forties and possibly with prematurely gray hair) "was still strong and muscular and was usually willing to demonstrate his strength." Smith related that not long after arriving in Nauvoo, Lott came to his father's red-brick store to purchase supplies. Joseph Smith had spent most of the afternoon wrestling with customers and had "thrown" all of them. When Lott walked in, carrying "a threatening-looking blacksnake whip that seemed to challenge all comers," Smith challenged him to a match. After Lott threw aside the whip and accepted the challenge, Smith was unable to throw him.

== Plural marriage ==
Lott practiced plural marriage. On January 22, 1846, he married three women: Elizabeth Davis, Rebecca Fossett, and Charity Dickenson. Elizabeth left while the family was in Winter Quarters, Nebraska. Rebecca left before the birth of their child, whom he never met. Charity appears to have stayed with him.

In 1848 he married Eleanor Wayman and Phebe Crosby Peck Knight, Hosea Stout's mother-in-law and widow of Joseph Knight.

== Utah ==
In late Spring 1848, Lott served as a captain in Heber C. Kimball's company, an early group crossing the plains. Mary Fielding Smith, a single mother and widow of Joseph Smith's brother Hyrum, was a member of the company. Lott told her that she should stay back until she could gather others to help her and her children make the journey. He said she would be a burden on the company. She refused, and according to her son, later church president Joseph F. Smith, Lott humiliated her throughout the trek. Joseph F. Smith despised Lott for his actions.

Once in the Salt Lake Valley, Lott and his families lived in a two-room house at the southwest corner of Third South and State Street in Salt Lake City. He managed a church farm in the Forest Dale area. One of his daughters married William S. S. Willes. Another of his daughters married John R. Murdock.

Lott died in 1850, of either dysentery or fatigue.
