= Danite =

Mormon fraternal organization

Danites
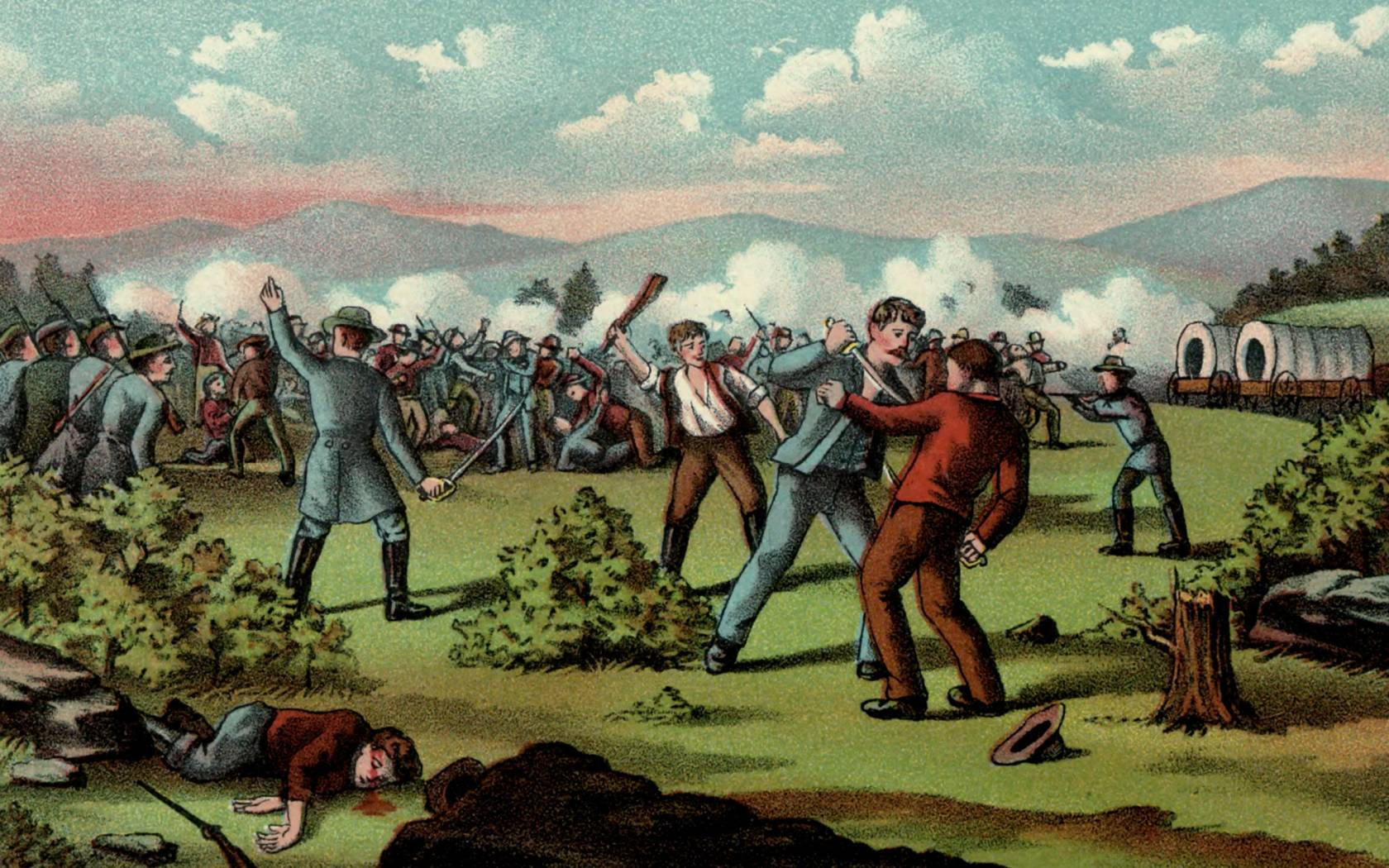
- The Danites during the 1838 Mormon War
- Named after: Prophet Daniel or Biblical Tribe of Dan
- Formation: June 1838
- Founder: Sampson Avard
- Founded at: Far West, Caldwell County, Missouri
- Purpose: To protect the Mormons from attacks, and to carry out reprisals against non-Mormon enemies and internal dissenters
- Services: Military Missouri Mormon War (1838): Daviess Expedition (1838)
- Methods: bodyguarding, policing, paramilitary and militia duties, vigilantism
- Members: 300?; 84 signatories in Danite manifesto; ~150 identified individuals
- Leader: Sampson Avard
- Key people: George W. Robinson (colonel); Jared Carter (captain general); Lyman Wight
- Parent organization: Society of the Daughter of Zion

The Danites were a fraternal organization founded by Latter Day Saint members in June 1838, in the town of Far West, Caldwell County, Missouri.

During their activities in Missouri, the Danites operated as a vigilante group and took a central role in the events of the 1838 Mormon War. They remained an important part of Mormon-related folklore, polemics, and propaganda for the remainder of the 19th century, waning in ideological prominence after Utah gained statehood in 1896. The nature and scope of the organization and the degree to which it was officially connected to the Church of Christ (Latter Day Saints) are not agreed among historians. Public and private statements from Joseph Smith referred to the band as being evil in nature and also a "secret combination" (a term used in the Book of Mormon to signify corruption within a group of people such as gangs, organized crime, and politics, as well as used in general parlance to signify unlawful conspiracy). However, early in the group's existence Smith appeared to endorse its actions, but later turned against it as violence increased and the actions of the Danites inspired a hysteria in Missouri that eventually led to the Extermination Order. According to an essay on the website of the Church of Jesus Christ of Latter-day Saints (LDS Church), "Historians generally concur that Joseph Smith approved of the Danites but that he probably was not briefed on all their plans and likely did not sanction the full range of their activities."

In 1834, during the march of Zion's Camp, a military expedition from Kirtland, Ohio, to Clay County, Missouri, Joseph Smith organized the first Mormon militia known as the "Armies of Israel", which pre-dated the Nauvoo Legion by eight years, to protect his community. Some historians have alleged this earlier militia to be the original formation of the Danite band. After the 1838 Missouri Mormon War, the term "Danite" was often connected with Latter Day Saint peacekeeping, including the Nauvoo, Illinois police, the bodyguards of Joseph Smith, and the "whistling and whittling brigades". Although some members of these later groups had been Danites in the Missouri period, leadership of the 1838 secret society, which came to be known as "Destroying Angels" in particular under group founder Sampson Avard, was not associated with leadership of the peace-keeping militias commonly referred to by the same name.

== Background ==
The Danites organized in the milieu of mutual hostility and conflict between the Mormon settlers and the more established Missourians, with numerous acts of violence perpetrated on both sides. They were active as a formal organization in Missouri in 1838. They began as a group of zealots determined to drive out internal dissention among the Mormons—dissenters which included former high ranking Mormons including the Three Witnesses—but progressed to becoming involved in militia and paramilitary conflicts with U.S. forces and both civilians and law enforcement of Missouri.

The Latter Day Saint movement had experienced periods of conflict and violence with neighboring communities. Prior to this period, Joseph Smith had promoted a non-violent policy, but this era of pacifism was coming to an end. In August 1833, Smith recorded a revelation that stated:

And now verily I say unto you, concerning the laws of the land, it is my will that my people should observe all things whatsoever I command them. And that law of the land which is constitutional, supporting that principle of freedom in maintaining rights and privileges, belongs to all mankind, and is justifiable before me. Therefore, I, the Lord, justify you and your brethren of my church, in befriending that law which is the constitutional law of the land; And to the law of man, whatsoever is more or less than this, cometh of evil.

This revelation encouraged church members "to bear it patiently and revile not" when "men will smite you, or your families" yet also justified self-defense: If, after being endangered three times, "he has sought thy life and thy life is endangered by him, thine enemy is in thy hands and thou art justified."

Prior to 1838, the Latter Day Saint movement had two centers—one in Kirtland, Ohio and the other in northwestern Missouri. The headquarters and First Presidency of the church were in Kirtland, while the Missouri church was led by a Stake Presidency made up of David Whitmer, W. W. Phelps, and John Whitmer. In 1836, John Whitmer and Phelps founded the town of Far West, Missouri, which became the headquarters of the church in Missouri. Throughout 1837, the church in Kirtland was experiencing internal conflicts over the failure of the church's bank. Ultimately, Joseph Smith and Sidney Rigdon of the First Presidency lost control of the headquarters, including the Kirtland Temple, to dissenters led by Warren Parish. Smith and his followers relocated to Far West, Missouri during the early part of 1838, beginning a period where Smith and other church leaders began to take the view that the church was fighting for its life.

In spring 1838, events came to a boiling point as the number of Mormons swelled in Missouri and Ohio and rifts within the church itself developed. Sudden heavy Mormon immigration, combined with their tendency to vote in a bloc, and their anti-slavery political and northern cultural views aroused hostility from the native Missourians. These tensions were escalated by the fact that Joseph Smith had been issuing prophecies that Missouri was meant to be the chosen place for Zion and the gathering of the Saints. Joseph Smith encouraged the Saints to be unafraid and referred to a passage in the 18th chapter of Judges about the tribe of Dan, "If the enemy comes, the Danites will be after them, meaning the brethren in self-defense." One of those who heard Joseph speak of the Danites was Sampson Avard. Sampson Avard secretly organized some of the brethren into companies for mutual defense and protection. He said he had the sanction of the First Presidency. He also taught those who would follow him that they should lead their companies against the gentiles, to rob and plunder them, and waste them away. With the loot, the kingdom of God would be built. The majority of Avard's followers left him in disgust, and soon Avard was excommunicated.

On the fourth of July in 1838, Mormon leader Sidney Rigdon delivered an oration in Far West, the county seat of Caldwell County. While not wishing or intending to start any trouble with his non-Mormon neighbors, Rigdon wanted to make clear that the Mormons would meet any further attacks on them—-such as had occurred in Jackson County during the summer and fall of 1833—with force. This however encouraged the Danites to offer resistance to the mobs that had driven them out of their homes in Jackson County. Latter Day Saints claims to rights to Missouri were countered back and forth with hostile rhetoric from non-Mormon news sources and politicians. Eventually the situation became dire, with one government agent writing:

The citizens of Daviess, Carroll, and some other normal counties have raised mob after mob for the last two months for the purpose of driving the Mormons from those counties and from the State. These things have at length goaded the Mormons into a state of desperation that has now made some members to become the aggressors instead of acting on the defensive.

== Formation ==
In June 1838 under the direction of Joseph Smith and Sidney Rigdon, a group of Mormons began meeting together in Far West under the leadership of Sampson Avard, Jared Carter, and George W. Robinson to discuss the problem of Mormon dissenters. The group organized under the name "The Daughters of Zion." A second group was formed in nearby Adam-ondi-Ahman where stake president and special counselor in the First Presidency John Smith recorded the name Danites in his diary and characterized the meetings as routine events. The name "Danites" probably refers to a Biblical prophecy found in the Book of Daniel (Daniel 7:18). According to Albert P. Rockwood, a loyal Mormon writing in October 1838:

The Companies are called Danites because the Prophet Daniel has said that the Saints shall take the kingdom and possess it forever.

Thomas B. Marsh, former President of the Quorum of the Twelve Apostles, left the church, citing improper handling of the church's finances by its leadership. He began writing and speaking critically of the church, which resulted in his formal excommunication. He left after hearing reports of the destruction of non-Mormon settlements, including Gallatin, by the Mormons. He was present at early Danite meetings and said that the Danites swore oaths "to support the heads of the church in all things that they say or do, whether right or wrong." The newly formed Danites disagreed initially on what steps to take against the dissenters, who had left the church but still lived nearby on land that had murky legal status. The properties had been purchased with a mixture of common and private funds, and in the name of both the LDS Church and private individuals. Reed Peck, another ex-Mormon, alleged that Carter and Dimick B. Huntington proposed that the group "kill these men that they would not be capable of injuring the church." Marsh (while still a practicing Mormon) and John Corrill successfully argued against the proposal.

=== "Salt Sermon" ===
John Corrill recalled that "the first presidency did not seem to have much to do with [the Danites] at first", and some of the Danites clearly saw this sermon as a sign of approval. The matter was tabled until the following Sunday (June 17, 1838) when Sidney Rigdon preached his Salt Sermon, in which he likened the dissenters to "salt that had lost its savor." He went on to state that the dissenters would be "trodden under the foot of men." Corrill stated that "although [Rigdon] did not give names in his sermon, yet it was plainly understood that he meant the dissenters or those who had denied the faith." Rigdon's strongly worded sermon may have played a significant role in encouraging the dissenters to leave the county.

=== Danite Manifesto ===
Ebenezer Robinson (who remained with the church after 1838), recalled that the next day a letter was "gotten up in the office of the First Presidency," which Danite leader Sampson Avard later charged was written by Sidney Rigdon. The letter was addressed specifically to the principal dissenters: Oliver Cowdery, David Whitmer, John Whitmer, William Wines Phelps, and Lyman E. Johnson. The letter demanded the dissenters depart the county, writing:

for out of the county you shall go, and no power shall save you. And you shall have three days after you receive this communication to you, including twenty-four hours in each day, for you to depart with your families peaceably; which you may do undisturbed by any person; but in that time, if you do not depart, we will use the means in our power to cause you to depart; for go you shall.

It made several accusations concerning the actions and character of these dissenters and then stated:

We have solemnly warned you, and that in the most determined manner, that if you do not cease that course of wanton abuse of the citizens of this county, that vengeance would overtake you sooner or later, and that when it did come it would be as furious as the mountain torrent, and as terrible as the beating tempest; but you have affected to despise our warnings, and pass them off with a sneer, or a grin, or a threat, and pursued your former course; and vengeance sleepeth not, neither does it slumber; and unless you heed us this time, and attend to our request, it will overtake you at an hour when you do not expect, and at a day when you do not look for it; and for you there shall be no escape; for there is but one decree for you, which is depart, depart, or a more fatal calamity shall befall you.

The letter — later known as the "Danite Manifesto" — displayed the signatures of eighty-three Mormons, including that of Joseph Smith's brother, and fellow member of the First Presidency, Hyrum, but not Joseph or Rigdon. Robinson later said that all of the signers were Danites.

The letter had the desired effect and the few named dissenters quickly fled the county, relocating to Liberty and Richmond in neighboring Clay and Ray counties. Despite the harsh treatment of the few vocal dissidents, a dozen others were permitted to peacefully remain in the community. One of the expelled dissenters, John Whitmer, said that they had been "driven from their homes" and robbed "of all their goods save clothing & bedding &c." Reed Peck agreed, asserting that "the claims by which this property was taken from these men were unjust and perhaps without foundation cannot be doubted by any unprejudiced person acquainted with all parties and circumstances."

== Expanding role ==
The Danites' role shifted from internal enforcement to external defense when the non-Mormon Missourian majority asked the Mormons to leave, at first making a request without threat of force. In coming months, hostilities between Mormons and Missourians would grow to the point that the Missouri State Militia drove most of the Mormons out of Missouri. Governor Lilburn Boggs issued Missouri Executive Order 44 on October 27, 1838, which expelled the Mormons from Missouri.

However, conflict developed between Smith and the Danites' leader, Sampson Avard. In Smith's account, Avard, while a new member to the Church, formed a "secret combination", an allusion to a nefarious society as discussed in the Book of Mormon. Smith further stated that Avard's pride and zeal prompted him to organize the group contrary to the will of Smith and the other leaders of the Church. According to this view, Avard illegitimately claimed to be the Lord's agent, and according to a quote Smith attributed to Avard, he wanted to profit from vigilantism by taking "spoils of the goods of ungodly Gentiles [non-Mormons]."

Joseph Smith soon took action against Avard in the name of the church, removing him from all military duties and establishing him as a surgeon to help with the wounded; Avard mentions this demotion himself. Avard was eventually excommunicated. Smith's History of the Church states: "When a knowledge of Avard's rascality came to the Presidency of the Church, he was cut off from the Church, and every means proper used to destroy his influence, at which he was highly incensed and went about whispering his evil insinuations, but finding every effort unavailing, he again turned conspirator, and sought to make friends with the mob."

With the opposition leaders ousted and the hostilities increasing, the Danite group took on three additional primary functions, (1) enforcement of the Law of Consecration, (2) political activities, and (3) militia activities.

=== Enforcers ===
The law of consecration was a commandment given to the church to establish a kind of communitarian program whereby the saints were to give or "consecrate all their money and property to the Church" and lease it back, so that the church could purchase lands for settlement by the destitute converts continually pouring into northwestern Missouri. Corrill recalled that "shortly after the Danites became organized, they set out to enforce the Law of Consecration, but this did not amount to much".

=== Political activities ===
In the realm of politics, the Danites were called upon to distribute tickets containing the names of candidates approved by the Presidency for the election which was held on August 6. Church leader John Corrill was the approved candidate and consequently won election to the Missouri House of Representatives, but he conceded, "Many saw that it was taking unfair advantage of the election and were extremely dissatisfied". Except for 15 or 20 votes, the election was nearly unanimous.

A second outpost of Danites had been organized in Daviess County under the leadership of Lyman Wight, who was also a colonel in the state militia. The Danites in Daviess County took part in the Gallatin Election Day Battle, when a group of non-Mormons attempted to prevent any Mormons from voting.

== Militia ==
Danite activity eventually progressed from political action to military action. On July 4, 1838, the Latter Day Saints in Far West held a large Independence Day celebration. As part of the celebration, a military review was held in which both the Mormons of the legal Caldwell County militia (led by Colonel George M. Hinkle), and the Danites (led by Jared Carter, Sampson Avard and Cornelius P. Lott) paraded. The keynote address came from church spokesman, Sidney Rigdon, who gave an oration, sometimes referred to as the Mormons' "Declaration of Independence" from the "persecution of mobs." In it, Rigdon announced:

And that mob that comes on us to disturb us, it shall be between us and them a war of extermination; for we will follow them until the last drop of their blood is spilled; or else they will have to exterminate us, for we will carry the seat of war to their own houses and their own families, and one party or the other shall be utterly destroyed..."

Although the First Presidency was generally pleased with the speech and had copies printed and distributed, Brigham Young later recalled that it was "the prime cause of our troubles in Missouri.

=== Daviess Expedition ===
The new policy of an "aggressive defense against mobs" was put into practice in Daviess County when a group of non-Mormon vigilantes, primarily from Clinton and Platte counties, began to harass Mormons in outlying areas. The vigilantes hoped to drive the Mormons from the county through a policy of intimidation, the burning of isolated homes, and the plundering of property. Seeing the mob violence as a repeat of the nightmares they went through in Independence, Missouri a half-dozen years earlier, the Latter Day Saints requested assistance from state authorities, with little success. On October 18, Joseph Smith called for the assistance of all men who could participate; elements of the Caldwell militia, as well as some of the Danites and their secret oaths of vengeance, gathered at Adam-ondi-Ahman, the Saints' headquarters in Daviess County. From there, Apostle David W. Patten led raiding parties against the settlements of Gallatin, Millport, and Grindstone Forks. The cannon with which the mob had promised to attack Far West was found buried in the ground, and the towns were basically deserted; remaining non-Mormons were expelled, and some stores and homes were burned. Additionally, the property left by the fleeing mobs was "consecrated" by the raiding parties and brought back to the bishop's storehouse in Adam-ondi-Ahman. These actions caused Apostles Thomas B. Marsh and Orson Hyde to dissent after this incident. They traveled to Richmond and swore out an affidavit concerning the existence of the Danites, and of a "destroying company" that had been set up with instructions to burn Richmond and Liberty.

=== Battle of Crooked River ===
1838 saw an escalation in tensions between the members of the Latter Day Saint church and their neighbors in northwestern Missouri. Ray County was located immediately south of the Mormon Caldwell County. The two counties were separated by a so called 'no man's land' measuring six miles by one mile, known as "Bunkham's Strip" or "Buncombe Strip." This unincorporated strip was attached to Ray County for administrative and military purposes. The citizens of Ray County and their neighbors to the west in Clay County, first began to have concerns about the Mormons to the north when a group of "dissenters" from the church were expelled from Caldwell County. These dissenters, including David Whitmer, W.W. Phelps, John Whitmer and Oliver Cowdery had been the leaders of the Latter Day Saint church in Missouri. They relocated their families to Richmond and Liberty, the county seats of Ray and Clay, respectively, and said that their lives had been threatened and their property had been stolen by the Mormons.

Conflicts between the Mormons and non-Mormons in Carroll County and Daviess County throughout the summer put settlers in the more settled counties of Ray and Clay increasingly on edge. This unease reached a bursting point when further dissenters, Thomas B. Marsh and Orson Hyde of the Mormon Quorum of the Twelve Apostles, arrived in Richmond and reported that the Mormons had invaded Daviess County and sacked the county seat of Gallatin. They also charged that a Mormon group known as the Danites planned to burn Richmond and Liberty to the ground. This testimony sent the worried citizens into a near frenzy. Women, children and property were ferried across the Missouri River for protection against an imminent Mormon invasion, and the state militia was put on alert.

==== Lead-up to the battle ====
General David Rice Atchison, of Clay County, commander of the state militia in northwestern Missouri ordered a company led by Captain Samuel Bogart of Clay County to patrol Bunkham's strip to "prevent, if possible, any invasion of Ray county by persons in arms whatever". Bogart was not necessarily the best man for the job. According to Peter Burnett, a resident of Liberty, "Captain Bogart was not a very discreet man, and his men were of much the same character." Bogart had previously participated in a vigilante group that harried the Mormons in Carroll County.

Bogart quickly exceeded his orders. He and his men began visiting the homes of Latter Day Saints living in Bunkham's Strip, forcibly disarming them and ordering them to leave Ray County. Bogart then apparently penetrated into Caldwell County and began to similarly harass Mormons there, advising them to remove to Far West, the county seat. Returning to Ray County, his men captured three Mormons — Nathan Pinkham, Jr., William Seely, and Addison Green — who may have been acting as scouts against a potential invasion from Ray County.

Exaggerated reports quickly made it to Far West to the effect that a "mob" had captured and intended to execute a group of Mormon prisoners. The Mormons immediately assembled an armed rescue party. Although Colonel George M. Hinkle, head of the official Caldwell County militia was available, Joseph Smith placed Apostle David W. Patten in charge of the force. Patten, who had come to be known as "Captain Fear-not", for his part in the attacks in Daviess County, was apparently a leader in the Danite organization, and the choice of him over Hinkle may indicate the rescue was planned as an unofficial excursion. The Mormon force quickly moved south along the main road connecting Far West and Richmond.

==== The battle ====
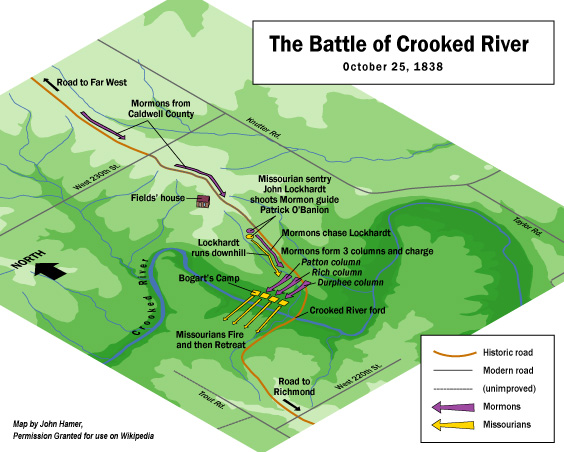
Click the image for an enlarged map illustrating the Battle of Crooked River.

On the night of October 24, 1838, Captain Bogart's unit had camped along the banks of Crooked River in Bunkham's Strip. Patten and the Mormon rescue company approached from the north along the main road. At daybreak on the 25th, the Mormons encountered the militia's sentries. A brief firefight ensued with each side testifying that the other had fired first. One of the sentries, John Lockhart, shot Patrick Obanion, the Mormons' scout. Obanion later died from this wound. Lockhart and the other guards then fled down the hill to the militia camp which took up a defensive position.

The Mormon company approached the camp of the Ray militia and formed a battle line in three columns, led by David W. Patten, Charles C. Rich, and Patrick Durfee. Rich later recalled that soon after the Mormons had formed their lines, the militia "fired upon us with all their guns." A general firefight commenced, but the militia were situated behind the riverbank and held the strategically superior position. Patten decided to charge the militia position, shouting the Mormon battle cry of "God and Liberty!" The Missourians were without swords and so broke their lines and fled across the river in all directions. During the retreat, the Mormons continued to fire and one of the militiamen, Moses Rowland, was killed.

During his charge, however, Patten was shot and mortally wounded. Ebenezer Robinson recalled that Patten had been "brave to a fault, so much so that he was styled and called 'Captain Fearnought'." Although it was not immediately realized, Gideon Carter had also been killed, making three Mormon fatalities and one militiaman fatality. The Mormons collected their wounded as well as the baggage Bogart's unit had left in the camp and made their way back to Far West.

=== Aftermath ===
Although the battle resulted in only four fatalities, the effect was a massive escalation of the Missouri Mormon War. Exaggerated reports (some saying that half of Bogart's men had been lost) made their way to Missouri Governor Lilburn Boggs who responded by issuing Missouri Executive Order 44, known as the "Extermination Order," which stated that "[t]he Mormons must be treated as enemies, and must be exterminated or driven from the state." Boggs called out 2,500 state militiamen to put down what he perceived to be open rebellion by the Mormons. In the end, the leaders of the church were captured and the bulk of the membership were forced to leave the state.

Thousands of Latter Day Saints had flowed into Missouri in just a few years; they were against slavery and voted as a bloc. This led to the unease and the mob action against the Saints; Sidney Rigdon fueled the fire with his July 4 speech. The Missouri state officials considered the Mormons to be the aggressors in the war, and after the destitute saints were forced to flee to Illinois, their homes in Far West and Adam-ondi-Ahman were occupied by the mob. A large number of church leaders, including Joseph Smith, Sidney Rigdon, Hyrum Smith, Parley P. Pratt, and George W. Robinson were charged with many crimes including treason. It was during a preliminary hearing that Smith and the other defendants learned that Danite leader Sampson Avard had testified against them. As a result of the testimony, Judge Austin A. King of the Fifth Circuit of Missouri ruled that there was sufficient evidence to hold Smith, Rigdon and other leaders for trial; nevertheless, they waited for over six months in Liberty Jail for their trial. Despairing of ever being allowed to come to trial, Smith and the others escaped from the prison, and soon made their way to join the Latter Day Saints in Quincy, Illinois.

== Number of Danites ==
The two primary and opposing views concerning the extent of the Danite organization are represented by authors D. Michael Quinn and Alexander L. Baugh.

Quinn follows the affidavit of self-professed Danite John N. Sapp, who stated on September 4, 1838, that the number of Danites was "betwixt eight and ten hundred men, well armed and equipped...." He also credits the testimony of another Danite, Anson Call, who said that "the whole of the Military Force" at Far West belonged to the Danite organization. Based on these and other statements, Quinn concludes nearly the entire fighting force of some 900 Mormon men in Caldwell and Daviess counties had become Danites, and furthermore by end of summer 1838, to be a member in full standing a Mormon must also have been a Danite. The Neal A. Maxwell Institute for Religious Scholarship at Brigham Young University has criticized Quinn's position, arguing it relies on sources of questionable accuracy.

In a second position, Baugh disagrees and argues with Quinn that the Danites were always "a select group." He finds the testimony of John Corrill, who gave the total number of Danites at 300, more reliable than that of Sapp or Call.

== Joseph Smith's involvement ==
According to an essay on the website of the LDS Church, "Historians generally concur that Joseph Smith approved of the Danites but that he probably was not briefed on all their plans and likely did not sanction the full range of their activities." Establishing the true leadership of an organization that self-identifies as secret and unofficial is problematic and has made establishing an accurate history surrounding the Danites difficult. While there are some primary accounts of the Danites and their activities, scholars of LDS church history largely hold that these sources are partisan (and quite often contradictory), with nearly all reports coming from disaffected Mormons such as Sampson Avard (ex-Mormon and former Danite with a well-documented vendetta against Smith and the church), John D. Lee (ex-Mormon who publicly said he had been scapegoated by the church), Fanny Stenhouse (an ex-Mormon who co-authored with her husband a series of exposés on Mormonism), and Ann Eliza Young (the ex-wife of Brigham Young and vocal opponent of the church). Certainly, the existence of the Danite band during the conflict known as the 1838 Mormon War is well established.

Joseph Smith never identified himself as a Danite. However, in 1834, Smith was elected as commander-in-chief of the Armies of Israel by the Kirtland high council. Though the Danite band self-identified as unofficial, there is confusion and controversy surrounding the independence of the Danite organization since its constitution states, "All officers shall be subject to the commands of the Captain General, given through the Secretary of War". Smith had the title of Secretary of War during the three years prior to the year in which it is widely believed the Danites were first organized. However, Smith did not attest to any affiliation with the Danite band, and none of the close contemporaries of Smith alleged otherwise.

In fact, despite likely originally approving of the Danites, Smith wrote of the actions of the Danites largely with disapproval and on more than one occasion. However, in speaking on dissenting Mormons, Smith wrote in his Scriptory Book that after Sidney Rigdon spoke on the subject of "dissenters," they (according to Smith) "took warning, and Soon they were Seen bounding over the prairie like the Scape Goat to carry of[f] their own Sins we have not Seen them Since, their influence is gone, and they are in a miserable condition. So also it with all who turn from the truth to Lying Cheating defrauding & Swindeling." It has been alleged by some historians that these comments evidenced Smith's approval of the Danites' actions.

Further, LDS Church leader Sidney Rigdon expressed disapproval of Danites, although he asserted his belief that the Mormons were within their rights to forcibly expel dissenters from their midst, saying that: "When a country, or body of people have individuals among them with whom they do not wish to associate and a public expression is taken against their remaining among them and such individuals do not remove it is the principle of republicanism itself that gives that community a right to expel them forcibly and no law will prevent it." Again, like the statements made by Smith, that such statements made by Rigdon could be said to be made in reference to the Danites is only suggestive.

There is one statement made by Joseph Smith which endorsed the Danite band, apparently near its inception. In his journal, Smith wrote: "Thus far, according to the order of the Danites. We have a company of Danites in these times, to put to right physically that which is not right, and to cleanse the Church of every great evil which has hitherto existed among us inasmuch as they cannot be put to right by teachings and persuasyons [sic]. This company or a part of them exhibited on the fourth day of July [—] They come up to consecrate, by companies of tens, commanded by their captains over ten."

Nonetheless, over time, as the prominence and violence of the group grew, Smith condemned the group, referring to them as "evil" in nature and a "secret combination" (a negative term in LDS Church usage). Since these condemnations largely appeared after Smith and the Church had been charged with treason in fall of 1838, and after Smith and the Church leaders became concerned with the actions of alleged rogue groups and their potential negative effect on the Mormon community at large, it is unclear whether they reflected philosophical or political positions of the moment.

Smith and the Church leaders eventually were forced to publicly excommunicate the Danite leader, Sampson Avard.

=== Hyrum Smith ===
Hyrum Smith, brother of Joseph Smith, was a member of the First Presidency of the church at the time that his signature appeared on the document known as the "Danite Manifesto." There has been dispute about if he in fact signed the document, or if instead others used his name because of his prominent position in the church.

=== Sampson Avard ===
Sampson Avard became the lead witness for the prosecution in a trial of Joseph Smith and other church leaders. As Avard was well known as the leader of the Danites, his role as a witness was a surprise to both the church and Missourians. Avard testified that he considered "Joseph Smith, as the prime mover and organizer of the Danite band."

Avard went on to implicate Smith as the overall commander of the Daviess Expedition and other Danite vigilante activities. He included a recitation of a Danite Constitution with eight articles, specifying that the "executive power" of the Danite society would be "vested in the president of the whole church." However, Moses Clawson, John Corrill, Reed Peck, and others (all well-known Danites) all named Avard as the head of the organization and not Smith. George M. Hinkle testified under oath that Joseph and Hyrum Smith never commanded any Danites in the field. Statements from known associates of Avard, including Ebenezer Robinson, Morris Phelps, and John D. Lee, place Smith in a more commanding role. Several scholars have pointed to evidence which suggests that, to avoid prosecution, Avard may have promised prosecutors that he and his associates (i.e., Robinson, Phelps, and Lee) would implicate Smith in the Danite organization.

While it is clear that Smith was aware of the existence of the Danites and, at least initially, approved of certain Danite activities, Smith's role in the creation of the Danites and especially his involvement in its later activities (particularly actions of escalating violence) remain unclear. After Avard's excommunication and disaffection from the Latter Day Saint community, Smith continued to publicly condemn both Avard individually and the Danite organization as a whole. No known documents show that the Danite band operated at any time during its history under official Latter Day Saint sanction, nor that the Danite band existed after Avard's excommunication and after 1838.

== Allegations in Utah ==
Historian Leland Gentry asserts that after Sampson Avard was captured in November 1838, the Danite movement "died a quick death." Gentry cites numerous evidences supporting this position in his book, "The Danite Band of 1838." Nevertheless, after the Mormons settled in Nauvoo, Illinois and later in Utah, they were dogged by rumors the Danites continued to exercise influence within the Mormon community.

These beliefs were fueled by the fact that many former Danites occupied prominent paramilitary or law enforcement roles in the new settlements. For example, alleged former Danite Hosea Stout became the chief of police in Nauvoo. Then, after Joseph Smith was assassinated in 1844, Brigham Young made Stout head of the "Whistling and Whittling Brigade" – a group of young boys who intimidated strangers by following them around Nauvoo "whistling" until they left. Another reported former Danite, Orrin Porter Rockwell, became a body guard to Joseph Smith in Nauvoo, and later to Brigham Young. Disaffected and dissenting ex-Mormon, Ann Eliza Young, stated that Rockwell gained fame as one of Young's "Destroying Angels".

Despite the presence of purported former Danites within the LDS Church, there is no evidence they continued to exist as an organized body after 1838, or that they participated in any actions against dissenting and former Mormons in Utah. For instance, while former Danite John D. Lee's lengthy confessional describes the operations of the Danites in Missouri, he makes no indication to the continued existence of the organization after the Mormons left the state.

When the expedition of Lt. John W. Gunnison was killed by Indians in 1853, some said that the Danites had a hand in the affair. However, these claims were refuted by an official investigation led by Gunnison's second in command. Similar reports circulated when Indians killed territorial official Almon W. Babbitt on the plains in 1856, though there is no evidence supporting this allegation.

In the 1870s, Ann Eliza Young and Fanny Stenhouse (both former Mormons) authored exposés of Mormonism. Young and Stenhouse stated that the Danites were active, and primarily occupied with the task of discreetly murdering and disposing of Mormon dissenters and outsiders perceived to be a threat to Brigham Young's power.

=== Brigham Young ===
Brigham Young denied that the Danites continued to exist. However, on July 5, 1857, just before the start of the Utah War, Young used language similar to the fiery sermons that preceded the 1838 Mormon War. In the address Young demanded military action against former Mormon persecutors, mobocrats, and the "priests, editors, and politicians" who were then denouncing the Mormons. Young declared that if these provocateurs came to the Utah Territory, the Mormons would "deal" with them. He stated that anyone who entered the territory and didn't "behave themselves," including any Mormon who "unlawfully disturbs anyone," would "find a 'Vigilance Committee.'" This was most likely a reference to the famous San Francisco Vigilance Committee of 1856, an organization that one writer called "the largest and most influential vigilante group in American history." Young also declared that any such men would find "not only the Danites, whom they talk so much about, biting the horses (sic) heels, but the scoundrels will find something biting 'their' heels."

Otherwise, Young persistently denied the existence of Danitism in Utah. For instance, in June 1857, he said in a public address: "[people claim that the Danites] are in every town and city throughout the whole of the United States, and that their object is not known by the people. That they are all over the world; that there are thousands of them, and that the life of every officer that comes here is in the hands of the Danites. That even the President of the United States is not safe, for at one wink from Brigham the Danites will be upon him and kill him...It is all a pack of nonsense, the whole of it."

Later, in September 1857, Young said in a private meeting of the church leadership,: "the world accuse !(sic) me of controlling the affairs of Calafornia (sic) & kansas (sic) &c. The people do believe that we have a Band Called the Danites but how Could they exist so long without shedding Blood? For we Cannot find that they have killed any body. But I do not know of any such men."

A decade later, Brigham Young again denied the existence of violence by Danites. On April 7, 1867, he stated:

Is there war in our religion? No; neither war nor bloodshed. Yet our enemies cry out "bloodshed", and "oh, what dreadful men these Mormons are, and those Danites! how they slay and kill!" Such is all nonsense and folly in the extreme. The wicked slay the wicked, and they will lay it on the Saints.

Historian Leonard Arrington attributes the stories of Danites in Utah to overzealous descriptions of the "Minute Men," a law enforcement organization created by Brigham Young to pursue marauding Indians and white criminals. Arthur Conan Doyle and other authors had also popularized the idea of blood-thirsty Danites riding rough-shod through Utah in various fictional works. At the same time, there is evidence that, purportedly in order to deter and punish crime in Utah Territory, Brigham Young occasionally authorized local church leaders to engage in vigilante actions on an ad hoc basis. For instance, in early 1857, Young ordered local authorities to monitor two recently released convicts who were on the trail to California. If they were caught stealing livestock along the way, he authorized their summary execution. Historian Ardis Parshall believes that this led to an attack on an unrelated party which wounded several individuals in a case of mistaken identity. Indeed, in the same sermon where he spoke of the Danites and Vigilance Committees in 1857, Young also stated: "There have been men here who have had their plans to arrange for robbing; and I will take the liberty to say that, when we find them, 'judgement will be laid to the line and righteousness to the plummet.' Those are my feelings, and I express them plainly, that the good and honest may be able to pass from the Eastern States to California, and back and forth, in peace...I want the people in the States to know that there are a few poor curses here, and to know that we do not want gangs of highwaymen here. And I say to such characters...we will send you home quick, whenever we can catch and convict you."

These vigilante actions may have also been a source for the continued Danite myth.

== Depictions in popular culture ==
Beginning in the 19th century, a number of authors, including the notable British fiction writers Arthur Conan Doyle and Robert Louis Stevenson, make references to "Danites" as a shadowy, secret group who terrorized the early LDS Church settlements in Utah. These references usually appear in popular fiction or works critical of the LDS Church, and rumors of Danites practicing some form of blood atonement often play a significant role in these accounts. The group has also been depicted on screen.

Washington Bailey, in his memoir, "A Trip To California In 1853", reported local rumor that Brigham Young's "Destroying Angels" were conducting raids on wagon trains near Salt Lake City and blaming it on Indians. However he was not an eyewitness to these events.

Lavinia Honeyman Porter, in her memoir "By Ox Team to California: A Narrative of Crossing the Plains in 1860" also reported rumors of raiding Mormons near Salt Lake City, but did not mention the raiding group by name, and herself passed safely through Salt Lake City and conducted trade and social visits with Mormons.

Danites feature prominently in Story of the Destroying Angel by Robert Louis Stevenson and Fanny Stevenson, part of the collection The Dynamiter. Danites are represented as a world-wide secret organization of spies and assassins, dedicated to enforcing the edicts of Brigham Young. They are described as the force that makes Utah a "strong prison [...] who can escape the watch of that unsleeping eye of Utah?" They are described as bloodthirsty murderers, planning the "massacre of sixty German immigrants" and with the ability of making dissenters disappear without a trace.

A particularly well-known example is Arthur Conan Doyle's fictionalization of the Danites in A Study in Scarlet, the first Sherlock Holmes novel, published in 1887. In the story, the Danites constitute a brutal group of enforcing vigilantes operating under the direction of Brigham Young—and more particularly the fictional Sacred Council of Four, silencing criticism and questioning, and preventing dissenters from leaving the Salt Lake Valley. Doyle's embellishment of the folklore surrounding the original Missouri band transplanted to a romantic wild west setting, the established criminal notoriety of Rockwell, and rumors of Young's Avenging Angels made acceptance of the "authoritative" Sherlock story a simple matter for English readers. However, after a visit to Utah in 1923, Doyle is reported to have said "...he had been misled by writings of the time about the church." In 1991, Doyle's daughter stated that "Father would be the first to admit that his first Sherlock Holmes novel was full of errors about the Mormons."

The Avenging Angel (1995) is a film featuring Brigham Young, Porter Rockwell, and Wild Bill Hickman that centers on the fictional character and his activities as a Danite.

Sally Denton, in her 2003 history of the 1857 Mountain Meadows massacre, American Massacre, claims that the Danites and blood atonement had a prominent role in 19th century Utah society. Denton attributes the creation of the Danites to Joseph Smith as his "secret group of loyalists" and suggests that they became "one of the most legendarily feared bands in frontier America." According to Denton, this "consecrated, clandestine unit of divinely inspired assassins" introduced "the ritualized form of murder called blood atonement--providing the victim with eternal salvation by slitting his throat." Denton said that "blood atonement" was one of the doctrines which Mormons held "most sacred" and that "[t]hose who dared to flee Zion were hunted down and killed." Denton implies that large numbers of such "atonements" occurred during the Mormon reformation of 1856, although "none of the crimes were ever reported in the Deseret News", and that the "bloody regime…ended with [Jedediah] Grant's sudden death, on December 1, 1856."

A major plot sequence of L. E. Modesitt Jr.'s 2009 science fiction novel Haze imagines a far future conspiracy of so-called "Danites" in the Utah city of St. George.

Thriller writer Steve Berry incorporates Danite and blood atonement lore in a contemporary setting in his 2014 novel The Lincoln Myth.

== See also ==
- Elias Higbee
- Latter Day Saints in popular culture
- Mormonism and violence
- Latter-day Saints Militias and Military Units

Preceded by Armies of Israel; 1834	Danites; 1838	Succeeded by Nauvoo Legion (Illinois State Militia); 1840–1845
