= Phoebe Ann Patten =

American missionary

- Born: Phoebe Ann Babcock; Around 1807
- Died: January 15, 1841; Quincy, Illinois
- Other names: Phoebe Anne Babcock Patten, Ann Patten, Phoebe Ann Patten Bently
- Occupation: Seamstress
- Known for: Early member, missionary, and caretaker in Church of Christ (Latter Day Saints)
- Spouse(s): David W. Patten; Benjamin R. Bently

Phoebe Ann Babcock Patten Bentley (c. 1807 – January 15, 1841) was an early member and missionary of the Church of Jesus Christ of Latter Day Saints, as well as a caretaker during the 1838 Mormon War and wife of early church leader and apostle David W. Patten. Little is known about her childhood except that she was born "Ann Babcock" sometime around 1807. At age 21, Babcock met David W. Patten. The two married in 1828, and Babcock adopted Patten's surname.

After her husband joined the Church of Christ (Latter Day Saints) in 1832, Ann was converted and baptized in the same year. While David was away on various missions, Ann Patten lived with other members of the church in Ohio and Missouri and supported herself financially by working as a seamstress. Ann also served a mission to Tennessee with her husband, an assignment almost unheard of at the time.

Following her husband's death at the Battle of Crooked River in 1838, Ann remarried Benjamin R. Bently, a young carpenter and non-Mormon who was living with the Pattens when David died. After a couple of years of marriage, Ann died of consumption on January 5, 1841, at the age of 34.

== Early life ==
Little is known about Phoebe Ann Babcock's early life. Born sometime around 1807, Babcock was living in Dundee, Michigan with her family when she met David W. Patten, a farmer who had recently moved to Michigan from New York and who was seven years her senior. The two married in 1828 in Dundee. It is not known how many children they had, but not one survived to adulthood.

== Conversion and membership ==
David W. Patten joined the Church of Christ (Latter Day Saints) in 1832 after hearing about it from his older brother, John Patten. After her husband's conversion, Ann joined the church the same year. In the years that followed, David was sent on several missions throughout the United States. During this time, Ann Patten supported herself by working as a seamstress and sharing housing with other members of the church in Ohio and Missouri.

Ann continued to support her husband for the rest of his life as he served as a member of the Quorum of the Twelve Apostles. When David was called to serve a mission to Tennessee, Ann decided to accompany him. A wife traveling with her husband on a mission was almost unheard of in the early days of the church. In addition, during conflicts between Mormons and non-Mormons during the 1838 Mormon War, while many of the leaders of the church were imprisoned or away, Ann served as a caretaker for many of the members in the area. Helen Mar Whitney, a member at the time, wrote about Patten:

"She was a noble and self-sacrificing woman, who left all for the gospel's sake... she was early thrown upon her own resources, and though she had a slight and delicate frame she had a persevering and energetic spirit..."

In 1838, David W. Patten was mortally wounded at the Battle of Crooked River. During this time, Ann was living in Far West, Missouri and was quite ill. Ann went with Joseph Smith, Jr., Hyrum Smith, and Heber C. Kimball to where David was dying. Right before he died, David spoke to Ann and said "Whatever you do else, Oh do not deny the faith." Soon afterwards he died.

Immediately after David's death all of the men in Far West were compelled to surrender their weapons and several members of a mob were looting houses in Far West, as a result of Missouri Executive Order 44. Vilate Kimball, a Mormon in Far West, said of Ann Patten's response to the mobs:

"I can never forget her fearless and determined look. Around her waist was a belt to which was attached a large Bowie knife. She had a fire in her stove and a large iron kettle full of boiling water and a big tin dipper in her hand intending, she said, to fight if any of the demons came there. She did not seem in the least excited, her countenance was perfectly calm and she shed no tears."

Despite her illness, during this time Ann Patten took care of several members of the church, including several women whose husbands were imprisoned at the time.

== Remarriage ==
During this time of turmoil, Ann remarried Benjamin R. Bently soon after David W. Patten's death. Bently was a young non-Mormon carpenter who had been living with the Pattens at the time of David's death. Unable to work because she was seriously ill with consumption, Ann accepted when Bently proposed, even though the marriage was deemed inappropriate for the wife of an Apostle to marry a non-Mormon. Bently later joined the church.

== Death ==
Following the expulsion of the Mormons from Missouri, the couple moved to Quincy, Illinois, where they rented a two-bedroom home. However, Ann Patten Bently finally died of consumption on January 5, 1841, after having the disease for five years, at the age of 34.

After Ann's death, Benjamin Bently remarried Rhonda Ann Thompson in 1846.
