= Hosea Stout =

American politician

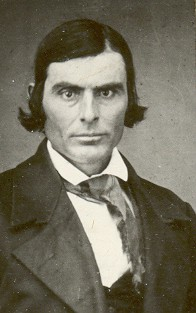
- Stout c. 1850s
- Born: September 18, 1810; Pleasant Hill, Kentucky, U.S.
- Died: March 2, 1889 (aged 78); Utah, U.S.
- Occupations: soldier, chief of police, bodyguard, lawyer, missionary, politician, diarist
- Employer(s): U.S government, Church of Jesus Christ of Latter Day Saints, self-employed
- Known for: Founding first Mormon mission in China in 1850s
- Spouse(s): Samantha Peck and five others
- Parent(s): Joseph Stout and Ann Smith
- Military career
- Allegiance: United States; Mormons
- Branch: United States Army; Mormon militia
- Units: United States Mounted Ranger Battalion (1832–1833); Mormon Danites (1838)
- Conflicts: Black Hawk War; Missouri Mormon War

Hosea Stout (September 18, 1810 – March 2, 1889) was an early leader in the Latter Day Saint movement, a Mormon pioneer, soldier, chief of police, lawyer, missionary, and politician in Utah Territory.

Stout was from Kentucky and one of the few early Mormons to come from the South. The Latter Day Saint Church occasionally opposed slavery which largely discouraged converts from this region of the U.S.

== Early life ==
Stout was born in Pleasant Hill, Kentucky, into the large family of Joseph Stout and Ann Smith, both strict Quakers. As a child, Stout was temporarily put in a Shaker school due to his family's financial hardships. However, after four years in the school, his father's circumstances improved and his father removed him from the school.

== Black Hawk War service ==
In 1832, Stout enlisted with United States Mounted Ranger Battalion under Major Henry Dodge to fight in the Black Hawk War. The U.S. Rangers recruited from frontiersmen who served a one year enlistment and had to provide their own rifles and horses.

== Latter Day Saints movement ==
During the time of the Black Hawk War, Stout became acquainted with the Latter Day Saints movement and was taught by Charles C. Rich, who later became an apostle. In 1837, he sold his business and moved to Caldwell County, Missouri, where the Latter Day Saints had gathered after their expulsion from Jackson County, Missouri, and Kirtland, Ohio. While there he married Samantha Peck. Shortly after this, he was baptized a member of the Church of Jesus Christ of Latter Day Saints.

During the Missouri Mormon War of 1838, Stout was a member of the Danites, a Latter Day Saint vigilante group. He took a central role in the events of the 1838 Mormon War and fought in the Battle of Crooked River. After the Latter Day Saints were forced to leave Missouri and moved to Nauvoo, Illinois, Stout served as a bodyguard for Joseph Smith. During this period, he was also a commander in the Nauvoo Legion and the Chief of Police of Nauvoo. He was further set apart as president of the eleventh Quorum of Seventies and made a member of the Council of Fifty, an organization created by Joseph Smith in preparation for the Second Coming of Christ.

About one month after the death of Joseph Smith and his brother, Hyrum, on June 27, 1844, their brother Samuel also died, under allegedly suspicious circumstances. Samuel Smith's daughter and William Smith, who was the only surviving Smith brother, later alleged that Stout had poisoned Samuel under orders from Brigham Young and Willard Richards, members of the Quorum of the Twelve Apostles. However, Stout was never tried for this alleged crime and Smith's claims are disputed.

Stout was an enthusiastic supporter of Mormon polygamy, calling it the "true and greatest principle of our holy religion."

== Utah Territory ==
=== Nebraska ===
After Brigham Young and the church were forced to leave Nauvoo in 1846, Stout served as the chief of police in Winter Quarters, Nebraska, when the Latter Day Saints migrated there. An early Mormon pioneer, Stout arrived in the Salt Lake Valley as a member of Heber C. Kimball's company in September 1848.

Sometime after leaving Nauvoo, Stout married additional wives, consistent with teachings and practices of the Church of Jesus Christ of Latter-day Saints (LDS Church) at the time. He married a total of six wives.

=== China and Hong Kong missions ===
On August 28, 1852, a decision was made by church leaders that missionaries Hosea Stout, James Lewis, and Chapman Duncan, along with Walter Thompson, were to travel on a mission to China. This was the first Latter-day Saint mission to China, and none in the group knew the Chinese language. Stout and his peers first traveled to the British Colony of Hong Kong, and from there traveled into mainland China. They made no converts there and so returned to Hong Kong, where they managed to convince only a few of their message. In late 1853, Stout and his peers returned to United States. His missions to China and Hong Kong were ultimately unsuccessful.

=== Wyoming ===
In November 1856, Stout helped rescue a snowbound handcart company caught in Wyoming. During the Utah War of 1857–58, Stout helped build and maintain fortifications in Echo Canyon meant to deter federal forces from entering Utah Territory. In later years, "Wild Bill" Hickman admitted to murdering Richard Yates during this period at the mouth of Echo Canyon. In a deal for immunity from prosecution, Hickman implicated Stout and other Mormon leaders in the murder. Stout was arrested for the crime in 1871 and was incarcerated for six months at Fort Douglas before being released and acquitted. In 1877, Stout retired from public life due to poor health and died 11 years later near Salt Lake City.

== Politics ==
In Utah, Stout started a long career in both law and politics. He was elected to the Utah Territory's House of Representatives in 1849 and was a part of the delegation to create a constitution for the proposed State of Deseret. Stout served as the first Attorney General of Utah Territory, and in 1851, he was one of the first lawyers admitted to the bar of Utah. From 1856 to 1857, he served as the speaker of the House. Later, he was chairman of the code commissioners, a territorial prosecutor, and U.S. Attorney.

== Diary ==
One of Stout's greatest contributions was as a diarist. The Diary of Hosea Stout has become an invaluable resource for historians of the Latter Day Saints in the nineteenth century.

== Publications ==
- Stout, Hosea, "Autobiography of Hosea Stout, 1810–1844"
- ——, "Crossing the Plains"
- ——, "On the Mormon Frontier: The Diary of Hosea Stout, 1844–1861"

Current editions:

- Brooks, Juanita (ed.) On the Mormon Frontier: The Diary of Hosea Stout, 1844–1889 (2009). ISBN 978-0-87480-945-9
- Prince, Stephen L. Hosea Stout: Lawman, Legislator, Mormon Defender (2016). ISBN 978-1-60732-476-8
- Stout, Reed A.(ed.) The Autobiography of Hosea Stout (2009). ISBN 978-0-87480-957-2

== See also ==
- Battle Creek, Utah
