= William S. S. Willes =

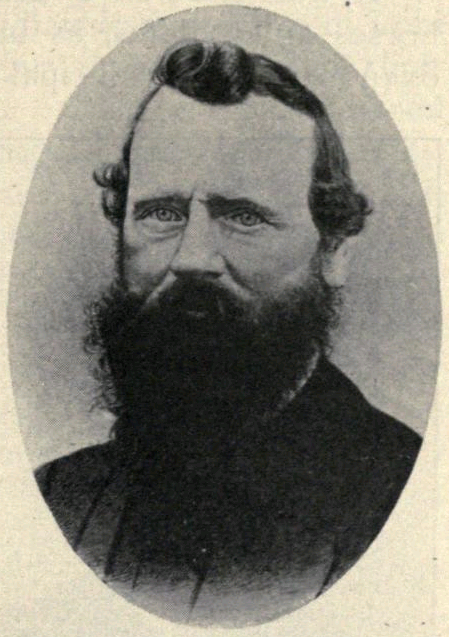
- Born: March 18, 1819; Jefferson County, New York
- Died: February 3, 1871 (aged 51)
- Occupations: Territorial militia captain City councilman
- Spouse(s): Lucinda Alzina Lott (1852); Docia Emmerine Molen (1857)
- Children: 11

William Sydney Smith Willes (March 18, 1819 – February 3, 1871), familiarly known as Sidney Willes, was a Mormon pioneer, member of the Mormon Battalion, and a founder of Lehi, Utah.

== Biography ==
Willes was born in Jefferson County, New York. In 1846, he marched as a member of the Mormon Battalion (private, Company B). In 1851 he arrived in Lehi, Utah. In 1852, he married 18-year-old Lucinda Alzina Lott, daughter of Cornelius Lott. They had 10 children together. Five years later Willes began practicing plural marriage when he married 24-year-old Docia Emmerine Molen. They had one child together, but then divorced. Docia married Lucinda's older brother in 1862. Willes did not take any additional plural wives.

Willes participated in the early political and civic life of Lehi, Utah. In 1853, he served on the first city council and was captain of the Lehi division of the Utah Territory militia, the Nauvoo Legion, in which he was involved in the Walker War and the Utah War. He later served as Alderman and in a variety of other positions, including on the 1865 Lehi Library Association. He was a member of the LDS Church's sixty-eighth quorum of Seventy when it was organized in Lehi in 1862.

During the April 1863 general conference, Willes was called on a mission to England. Upon his return, he captained a pioneer company of English and German saints that crossed the plains in late summer 1865.

Willes died on February 3, 1871, at the age of 51.

== Citations ==
- Gardner, Hamilton (1913), History of Lehi, Including a Biographical Section, Salt Lake City, Utah: The Lehi Pioneer Committee, The Deseret News
