= Thomas B. Marsh =

First President of the Quorum of the Twelve Apostles

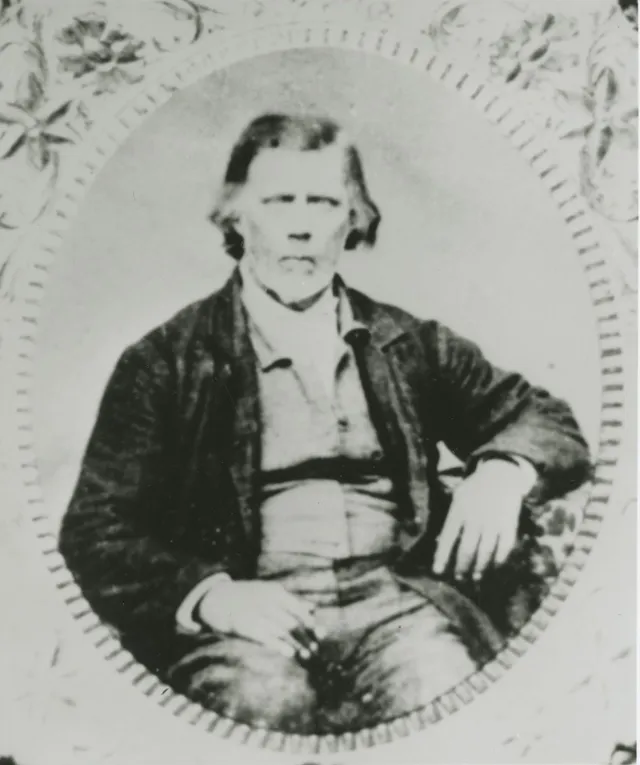

President of the Quorum of the Twelve Apostles
- April 25, 1835 – March 17, 1839
- Successor: Brigham Young
- End reason: Excommunication for apostasy

Quorum of the Twelve Apostles
- April 25, 1835 – March 17, 1839
- Called by: Three Witnesses
- End reason: Excommunication for apostasy

Latter Day Saint Apostle
- April 25, 1835 – March 17, 1839
- Called by: Three Witnesses
- Reason: Initial organization of Quorum of the Twelve
- End reason: Excommunication for apostasy
- Reorganization at end of term: No apostles immediately ordained

Personal details
- Born: Thomas Baldwin Marsh; November 1, 1800; Acton, Massachusetts, U.S.
- Died: January 1866 (aged 65); Ogden, Utah Territory, U.S.
- Resting place: Ogden City Cemetery; 41.233°N 111.962°W

Thomas Baldwin Marsh (November 1, 1800 – January 1866) was an early leader in the Latter-day Saint movement and an original member of the Quorum of the Twelve Apostles, who served as the quorum's first president in the Church of the Latter Day Saints from 1835 to 1838. He withdrew from the church in 1838, was excommunicated from it in 1839, and remained disaffected for almost 19 years. Marsh was rebaptized into the Church of Jesus Christ of Latter-day Saints (LDS Church) in July 1857, but never again served in church leadership positions.

== Early life ==
Marsh was born in the town of Acton, Massachusetts, to James Marsh and Molly Law. He spent his early life farming in Westmoreland, New Hampshire.

As a young man, Marsh developed a pattern of traveling and working for various employers. Marsh ran away at age 14 to Chester, Vermont, and worked as a farmer for three months. Then he left for Albany, New York, working as a waiter for 18 months. He spent two years working at the New York City Hotel, then returned to Albany for a year, and then back at the New York hotel for two more years. He also spent 18 months working as a groom for Edward Griswold on Long Island, New York.

During the time Marsh was employed by Griswold, he married Elizabeth Godkin in New York City on his 20th birthday in 1820. After his marriage, he attempted unsuccessfully to run a grocery business for 18 months. He subsequently spent seven years working at a type foundry in Boston, Massachusetts.

During his time in Boston, Marsh became a member of the Methodist Church. However, Marsh became dissatisfied because he came to believe that Methodism did not correspond to the Bible. Marsh left the Methodist Church and joined a group of friends in what others called a Quietist sect.

== Conversion and baptism ==
In 1829, Marsh unexpectedly left his home in Boston and journeyed west, traveling with Benjamin Hall, one of his friends from the Quietist sect. In his words, "I believed the Spirit of God dictated me to make a journey west." He stayed at Lima, New York in Livingston County for three months before returning home. On the way home, he stopped at Lyonstown, where a woman informed him of the golden plates that Joseph Smith was said to have obtained. She directed him to Palmyra, New York, and told him to seek out Martin Harris for more information.

Marsh traveled to Palmyra in 1830 and discovered Harris at a printing office, working on the printing of the Book of Mormon. Marsh obtained the first sixteen pages of the book as a printer's proof and also met Oliver Cowdery at the printing office.

Returning to his home, Marsh showed the sixteen pages to his wife. They both were pleased and began to correspond with Cowdery and Smith. After the Church of Christ was formed on April 6, 1830, Marsh moved with his family to Palmyra to join them that September.

Shortly after his arrival, Marsh was baptized by David Whitmer in Cayuga Lake on September 3, 1830, and soon after was ordained an elder by Cowdery. From September 26 to 28, 1830, Smith said he received Doctrine and Covenants section 31, a revelation directed at Marsh. In this section, he was told that he would be as "a physician to the church"

Marsh moved with the church to Kirtland, Ohio in the spring of 1831. He was ordained a high priest and received a call to proselytize in Missouri with Ezra Thayre. Thayre delayed for a long time, and so Selah J. Griffin was appointed to take Thayre's place.

== Apostleship ==
Smith organized the first Quorum of the Twelve Apostles on February 14–15, 1835. Smith arranged the members of the quorum by age. As there was confusion over David W. Patten's birth date, Marsh was identified as the eldest of the apostles and was therefore designated quorum president. According to Marsh's autobiographical sketch, published in 1864: "In January, 1835, in company with Bishop Partridge and agreeable to revelation, I proceeded to Kirtland, where we arrived early in the spring, when I learned I had been chosen one of the Twelve Apostles. ... May 4, 1835, in company with the Twelve I left Kirtland and preached through the eastern states, holding conferences, regulating and organizing the churches, and returned September 25. ... In the winter of 1835–36, I attended school, studied the first English grammar under Sidney Rigdon, and Hebrew under Professor Seixas (a Hebrew by birth)". He traveled east with the Twelve Apostles on a mission later in 1835.

After these activities with the Twelve Apostles, Marsh returned to Fishing River, Clay County, Missouri, in April 1836. Severe difficulties between members of the church and the larger community continued to plague the Saints in Missouri. Animosity had been building for years over what one county judge, Samuel Lucas, and other town leaders saw, feeling the Saints and their revelations were threats to their property and political power. Marsh was chosen as a delegate from his community to try to resolve these issues. Despite the efforts of church members, their Missouri neighbors decided that church members must leave Clay County.

Marsh traveled to Latter Day Saint congregations in other states, including Kentucky, gathering loans at an interest of ten percent to help the Clay County Saints obtain new property. The diary of apostle Wilford Woodruff contains an account of part of that journey:

Aug. 20th - Elder [David] Patten preached at the house of Randolph Alexander, and after meeting baptized him and his wife. Brother T. B. Marsh arrived in Tennessee on his mission to collect means, and attend a Conference with the brethren laboring in Tennessee and Kentucky, which was held on Damon's Creek, Callaway County, Kentucky, Sept. 2nd 1836. T. B. Marsh presided. Seven Branches were represented containing 133 members. Sept. 19th. - Elders T. B. Marsh, D. W. Patten, E. H. Groves and Sister Patten left the Saints in Kentucky and Tennessee and started for Far West, Missouri, where they arrived in peace and safety.

In September 1836, Marsh returned to Missouri and joined the Latter Day Saints in their new location, a city called Far West in Caldwell County, Missouri. The town had been founded by the presidency of the Missouri Stake, consisting of David Whitmer, W. W. Phelps and John Whitmer. Around this time, Marsh traveled to Canada on a mission with Joseph Smith and Sidney Rigdon. Meanwhile, in Kirtland, the financial situation of many of the church members unraveled with the failure of the Kirtland Safety Society bank. A dispute arose between the presidency in Missouri and the church's First Presidency in Kirtland over the land funds, with both sides accusing the other of financial improprieties.

Marsh sided with the First Presidency and convened a series of church courts in the spring of 1838. He charged the Whitmers, Phelpses, and Cowdery of financial impropriety and other failings. The court released these men from their positions and disfellowshipped them. On February 10, 1838, Marsh was put in charge of supervising the church in Missouri, with David W. Patten and Brigham Young as his assistants.

In April 1838, Joseph Smith and his first counselor, Sidney Rigdon, moved to Far West, which became the new church headquarters.

== 1838 split with Smith ==
In Missouri, some of the Latter Day Saints, led by Sampson Avard, formed a society which came to be known as the "Danites." According to Marsh, these men swore oaths to "support the heads of the church in all things that they say or do, whether right or wrong".

Although disfellowshipped, David Whitmer, John Whitmer, Oliver Cowdery, W.W. Phelps, and other former leaders (who were known as the "dissenters") continued to live in the county. According to Reed Peck, two of these Danites, Jared Carter and Dimick B. Huntington, proposed at a meeting that the society should kill the dissenters. Marsh and fellow moderate, John Corrill, spoke vigorously against the motion. However, on the following Sunday, Rigdon issued his "Salt Sermon," in which he likened the dissenters to salt that had lost its savor and was "good for nothing, but to be cast out, and to be trodden under foot of men". Within a week the dissenters had fled the county.

On October 18, a group of Mormons entered Daviess County and engaged in the looting and burning of non-Mormon settlements, including Gallatin. Marsh stated:

A company of about eighty of the Mormons, commanded by a man fictitiously named Captain Fearnot [David W. Patten], marched to Gallatin. They returned and said they had run off from Gallatin twenty or thirty men and had taken Gallatin, had taken one prisoner and another had joined the company. I afterwards learned from the Mormons that they had burned Gallatin, and that it was done by the aforesaid company that marched there. The Mormons informed me that they had hauled away all the goods from the store in Gallatin, and deposited them at the Bishop's storehouses at Adam-ondi-Ahmon.

On October 19, 1838, the day after Gallatin was burned, Marsh and fellow apostle, Orson Hyde, left the association of the church. Marsh drafted and signed a legal affidavit against Smith on October 24, 1838, which Hyde also signed. In addition to reporting on the organization of the Danites and on the events in Daviess County, Marsh reported rumors that the Danites had set up a "destroying company" and that "if the people of Clay & Ray made any movement against them, this destroying company was to burn Liberty & Richmond." He further stated his belief that Smith planned "to take the State, & he professes to his people to intend taking the U.S. & ultimately the whole world". The committee that received Marsh's and Hyde's affidavit noted that Marsh and Hyde left the church due to their "conviction of [the Mormons'] immorality and impiety."

Marsh's testimony added to the panic in northwestern Missouri and contributed to subsequent events in the Mormon War.

Marsh was excommunicated from the church on March 17, 1839.

== Rebaptism in Utah ==
On July 16, 1857, Marsh was rebaptized into the LDS Church in Florence, Nebraska. Marsh wrote an autobiography in 1864, recounting his church service and rebellion. It was published in the Millennial Star in June of that year. However, his religious affiliation still may not have been fixed. According to Thomas Job, a missionary of the Reorganized Church of Jesus Christ of Latter Day Saints serving in Utah, shortly before his death Marsh:

had been in the Josephite conference in Salt Lake City, and bore a strong testimony to the truth, and necessity of the reorganization; and when a revelation through young Joseph was read to him he said that it was the voice of God, and again testified that he knew it, and desired us to write to the young prophet to send for him back from here, that he had faith that he would bear the journey, and join the young prophet, if he could go that [last] spring.

After Marsh moved to Utah and joined the LDS Church, he spoke of his split with Smith:

About this time I got a beam in my eye and thought I could discover a mote in Joseph's eye, though it was nothing but a beam in my eye; I was so completely darkened that I did not think on the Savior's injunction: "Thou hypocrite, why beholdest thou the mote which is in thy brother's eye, when a beam is in thine own eye; first cast out the beam out of thine own eye, then thou shalt see clearly to get the mote out of thy brother's eye".

While not a reason for his withdrawal from the church, Marsh also admitted that polygamy had been a "great bugbear" prior to his rebaptism, his concern about the practice being resolved when he read writings of Orson Pratt on the subject and understanding it to be "heaven's own doctrine"

Marsh moved west to Utah Territory in 1857 and settled in Spanish Fork and later Ogden. He died in Ogden in January 1866. He is buried at the Ogden Cemetery.

== "Milk and strippings" story ==
On April 6, 1856, George A. Smith stated that Marsh had left the church because of a dispute between his wife and another female church member over a milk cow, which had escalated all the way up to the First Presidency. LDS Church president Gordon B. Hinckley has repeated the story, as have official church publications.

== Modern opinion in the LDS Church ==
Marsh's conversion story is occasionally cited as an example of how powerful the Book of Mormon can be in convincing people of the truthfulness of the church. When his apostasy is mentioned, he is often referred to either as an example of pride or as an example of one who failed to fulfill his calling to serve the church. For example, in 2006, David A. Bednar of the Quorum of the Twelve Apostles, repeated the "milk and strippings story". He contrasted Marsh's faithlessness with the devotion of Brigham Young. Bednar states: "In many instances, choosing to be offended is a symptom of a much deeper and more serious spiritual malady. Thomas B. Marsh allowed himself to be acted upon, and the eventual results were apostasy and misery. Brigham Young was an agent who exercised his agency and acted in accordance with correct principles, and he became a mighty instrument in the hands of the Lord."

== Notes ==
Church of the Latter Day Saints
(Renamed Church of Jesus Christ of Latter Day Saints in 1838)
First	President of the Quorum of the Twelve Apostles; April 26, 1835 – March 17, 1839	Succeeded by Brigham Young
New creation	Quorum of the Twelve Apostles; April 26, 1835 – March 17, 1839	Succeeded by David W. Patten
