= Sampson Avard =

Mormon vigilante

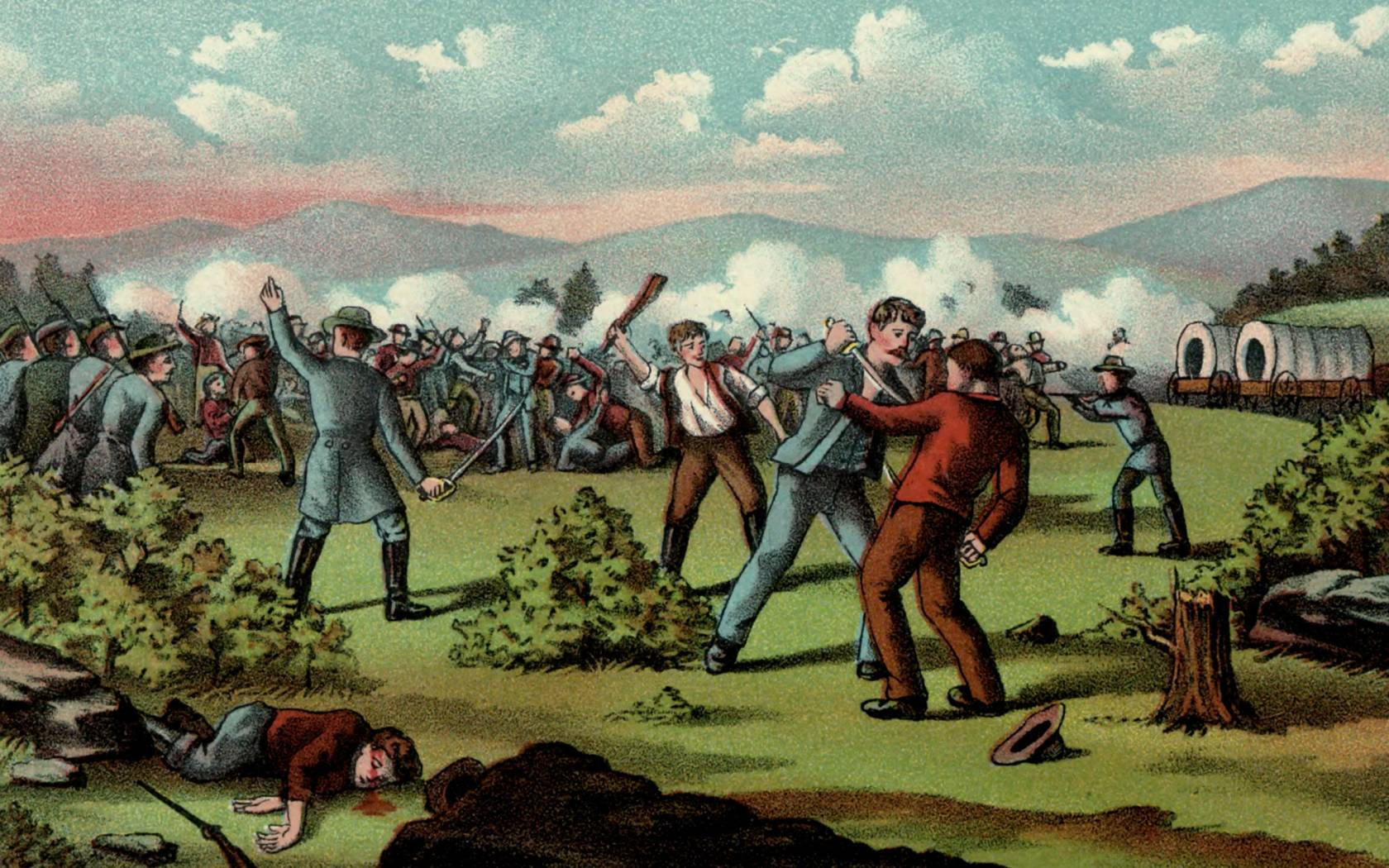
- The Danites, whom Avard co-found and led, during the 1838 Mormon War
- Born: October 23, 1800/1803; Saint Peter, Guernsey
- Died: April 15, 1869 (age 69-72); Edwardsville, Illinois
- Occupations: Physician; minister; church elder; soldier
- Employer(s): Church of Jesus Christ of Latter Day Saints, self-employed
- Known for: Being one of the founders and leaders of the Mormon Danites in 1838
- Military career
- Allegiance: Church of Jesus Christ of Latter Day Saints
- Branch: Mormon militia
- Service years: 1838
- Unit: Mormon Danites
- Commands: Mormon Danites commander
- Conflicts: Missouri Mormon War: Battle of Crooked River (1838)

Sampson Avard (October 23, 1800 – April 15, 1869) was one of the founders and leaders of the Mormon fraternal organization known as the Danites, which existed in Missouri during the 1838 Mormon War.

== Early life ==
Sampson Avard was born on October 23, 1800/1803 at Saint Peter, Guernsey. Subsequently immigrating to the United States, he worked as a physician and later became a Campbellite minister in Pennsylvania.

== Mormon convert ==
In 1835 in Freedom, Pennsylvania, Orson Pratt baptized him a member of Church of the Latter Day Saints.

=== Church elder ===
Pratt ordained him an Elder and leader of the local branch of the church. After serving a mission near his home with Erastus Snow, he moved to the Latter Day Saint community at Kirtland, Ohio in 1836. He was ordained a High Priest in 1837, though his position as a High Priest was also revoked that same year for unclear reasons.

=== Danites ===
In 1838, while living in Far West, Missouri and serving in the church's High Council there, Avard witnessed the heated conflict between the growing Mormon population and the established non-Mormon Missourians. He was the founding organizer and leader of the Danites, a secret paramilitary vigilante militia, bound by oaths and intent on retaliating for Mormon injuries and losses. It remains unclear the extent to which Joseph Smith was aware or in favor of Avard's activities, although he recognized the Danites and encouraged them to be lawful. Danite militaristic activities intensified the 1838 Mormon War and drew the attention of state government and militia.

=== Arrest and excommunication ===
After the Mormons were expelled from Missouri and Joseph Smith was arrested, Avard was the chief witness against Smith, testifying that Smith was the mastermind behind the Danites. Smith denounced the group as "frauds and secret abominations" and excommunicated Avard in March 1839. Avard never attempted to return to the Latter Day Saints.

== Post-Mormon years ==
In 1850 Sampson Avard was practicing medicine in Edwardsville, Illinois.

== Death ==
Sampson Avard died in 1869 in Edwardsville, Madison County, Illinois.
