= Battle of Crooked River =

Skirmish during the 1838 Mormon War

Coordinates: 39°29′50.45″N 94°7′36.96″W

- Part of the 1838 Mormon War
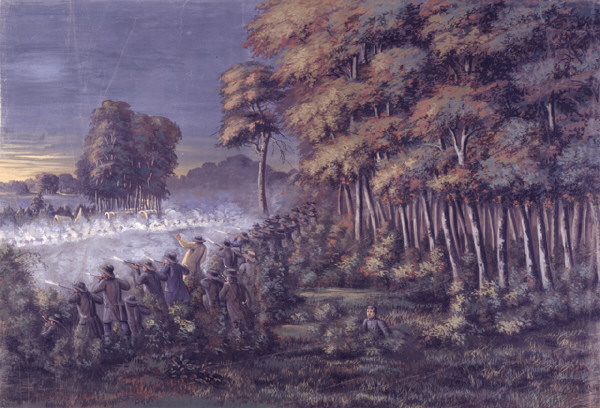
- A painting of the Battle of Crooked River, October 24th 1838
Date	October 25, 1838
Location	Crooked River, Missouri, U.S.
Result	Mormon victory

Belligerents
Mormon forces	Missouri Volunteer Militia

Commanders and leaders
David W. Patten †	David Rice Atchison; Samuel Bogart

Strength
Unknown	1 company

Casualties and losses
3 killed; 8 wounded	1 killed; 1 wounded

The Battle of Crooked River was a skirmish that occurred on October 25, 1838, and was a major escalator of the 1838 Mormon War. A Mormon rescue party, led by David W. Patten, formed to free three Mormon captives taken from Caldwell County the day prior, clashed with a Ray County militia company commanded by Samuel Bogart southeast of Elmira, Missouri. Exaggerated reports of the battle led Missouri Governor Lilburn Boggs to issue Executive Order 44, resulting in the forced expulsion of the Mormons from the state.

== Background ==
Ray County was located immediately south of the Mormon-dominated Caldwell County. The two counties were separated by a no-man's land 24 miles long and 6 miles wide, known as "Bunkham's Strip" or "Buncombe Strip". This unincorporated strip was attached to Ray County for administrative and military purposes.

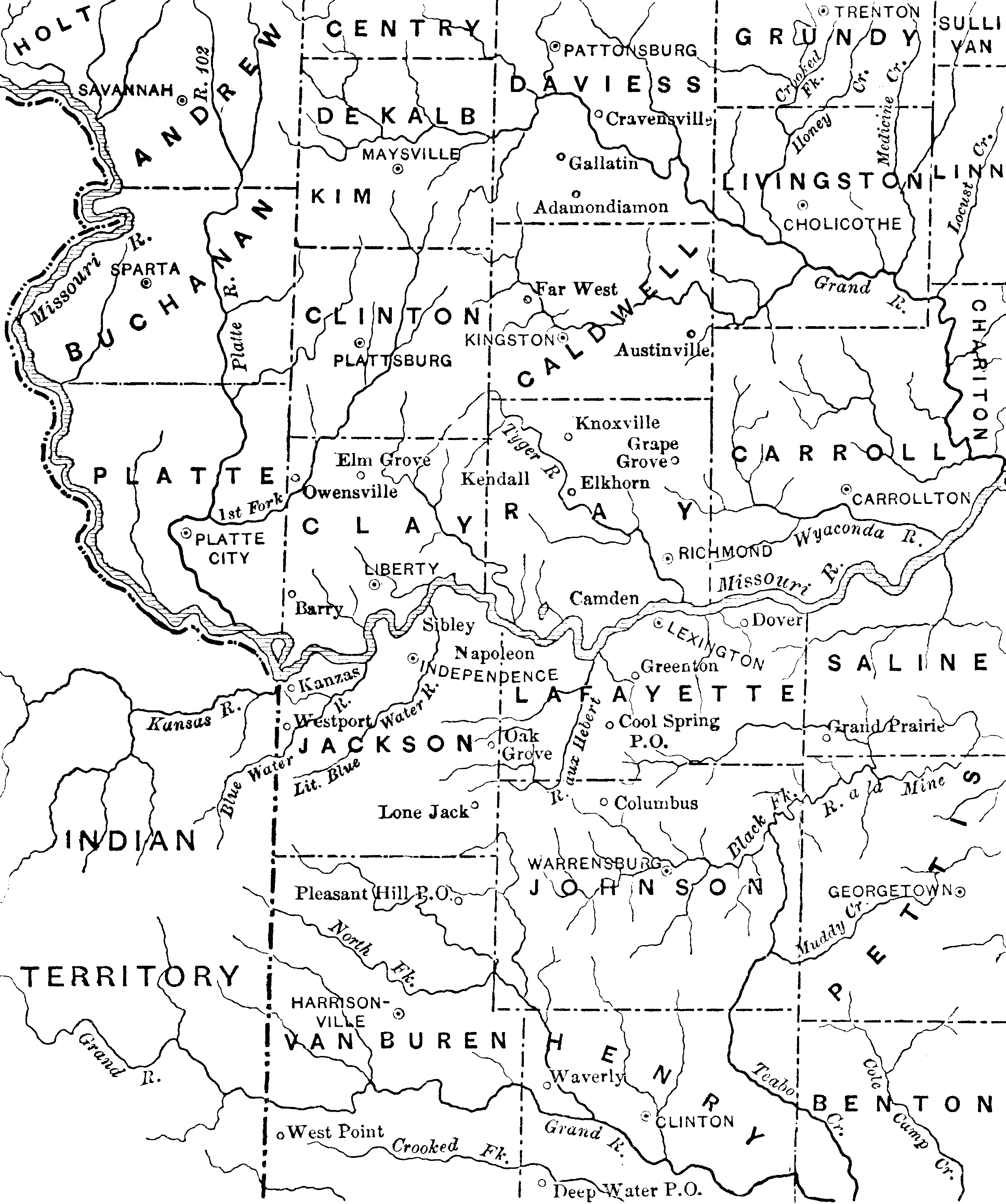
Settlements in western Missouri in 1838

In early 1838, a group of prominent leaders from the Latter Day Saint church, including David Whitmer, William W. Phelps, John Whitmer and Oliver Cowdery, were excommunicated on accounts of wrongdoing. They fled Caldwell County and relocated their families to Richmond and Liberty, the county seats of Ray and Clay, respectively. The expulsion of the dissenters alarmed and created mistrust among the Missourians.

Meanwhile, relations between the Missourians and the Mormons living in the recently colonized Carroll and Daviess counties deteriorated. In August, a brawl erupted in Gallatin when a group of Missourians attempted to block the Mormons from voting. In early October, a mob besieged the Mormon settlement of De Witt, Missouri, demanding that the Mormons leave Carroll County. The citizens of DeWitt appealed for assistance to other Mormon settlements. In response, the Danites, a Mormon vigilante group, marched to Daviess County, Missouri, where they believed the attackers where located, and sacked the county seat of Gallatin. The following day, apostles Thomas B. Marsh and Orson Hyde left their association with the Church, and swore out affidavits reporting on the Daviess County expedition, the existence of the Danites, and rumors that the Danites were planning to attack Richmond and Liberty. Though no such attack was ever contemplated, dispatches of militia forces were authorized to prevent such an invasion.

== Prelude to the battle ==
General David R. Atchison of Clay County, commander of the state militia in northwestern Missouri, ordered a company led by Captain Samuel Bogart of Ray County to patrol Bunkham's Strip to "prevent, if possible, any invasion of Ray county by persons in arms whatever". According to Peter Burnett, a resident of Liberty, "Captain Bogart was not a very discreet man, and his men were of much the same character". Bogart had previously been dispatched to help disperse the siege of De Witt; however his militia went rogue and joined the vigilantes that harried the Mormons in Carroll County.

Bogart and his party began visiting the homes of Latter Day Saints living in Bunkham's Strip, forcibly disarming them and ordering them to leave Ray County. Bogart penetrated into Caldwell County and began to similarly harass Mormons there, advising them to remove to Far West, Missouri, the county seat. Returning to Ray County, his men captured three Mormons — Nathan Pinkham, Jr., William Seely, and Addison Green.

Reports quickly made it to Far West to the effect that a "mob" had captured and intended to execute a group of Mormon prisoners. About midnight, an armed rescue party formed. David W. Patten led the contingent of Caldwell county militia. Patten had come to be known as "Captain Fear-not," for his bravery during the attacks in Daviess County. On the night of October 24, 1838 the Mormon force quickly moved south along the main road connecting Far West and Richmond, approaching Captain Bogart's unit, which was camped along the banks of Crooked River, from the north along the main road. They travelled five hours starting on midnight.

== The battle ==
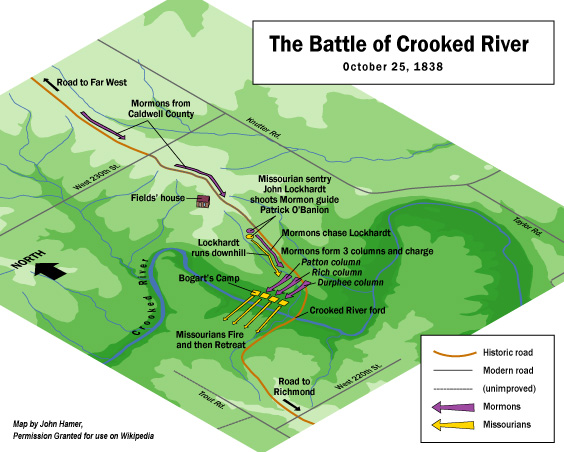
Map illustrating the Battle of Crooked River.

The Mormons encountered one of the militia's sentries, John Lockart, with whom the Mormons briefly exchanged words. After Lockhart reportedly heard a gun snap, he shot at the crowd, hitting Patrick O'Bannion, the Mormons' scout. O'Bannion later died from this wound. Lockhart fled down the hill to the militia camp, while the Mormon company formed a line in three columns, led by David W. Patten, Charles C. Rich, and Patrick Durfee.

Rich later recalled that soon after the Mormons had formed their lines, the militia "fired upon us with all their guns". A general firefight commenced, but the militia were situated behind the riverbank and held the tactically superior position. Patten decided to charge the militia position, shouting the Mormon battle cry of "God and Liberty!" The Missourians were without swords and so broke their lines and fled across the river in all directions.

During his charge, Patten was shot and mortally wounded. Ebenezer Robinson recalled that Patten had been "brave to a fault, so much so that he was styled and called 'Captain Fearnought'". Although it was not immediately realized, Gideon Carter had also been killed, making a total of three Mormon fatalities and one militiaman fatality. The Mormons collected their wounded as well as the baggage which Bogart's unit had left in the camp and made their way back to Far West.

During the conflict, one of the militia men named Samuel Tarwater was injured by Parley P. Pratt. After Tarwater fell unconscious from the injury, D. Michael Quinn states the company of Danites "mutilated the unconscious Tarwater 'with their swords' striking him lengthwise in the mouth, cutting off his under teeth, and breaking his lower jaw; cutting off his cheeks ... and leaving him [for] dead."

Crooked River Casualties
Affiliation	Name	Fate	Details
Mormon	Patrick O'Banion	Died from injuries	Eighteen-year old O'Banion was possibly not a member of the church but was compelled to guide the Mormons to Bogart's camp, which he apparently knew the location of. He was shot by the sentry John Lockhart as the Mormons went down the road towards the Missourian camp. Lockhart and a second sentry fled while the Mormons pursued, with two Mormons (John P. Greene and Lorenzo Young) taking O'Banion to the side of the road before joining the chase. He was mortally wounded and was taken to the house of Stephen Winchester rather than Far West, where he apparently died sometime after David W. Patten, passing anytime between the afternoon of October 25 or the morning of October 26. His may have been one of the three men reportedly wounded in the bowels.
"	David W. Patten	Died from injuries	During the charge on the Missourians led by Patten, he and Charles C. Rich each went after a Missourian who wasn't retreating, and Patten, wearing a white shirt and being an easy target. The Missourian went behind a tree, turned around, and fired. Patten was shot "in his bowels" and gravely wounded. Rich took command after Patten was wounded. Patten was so badly wounded that he asked to be left behind, but was taken off the battlefield on a litter. Because of the severity of his wounds it was decided to stop at Stephen Winchester's home rather than try to reach Far West. He was visited by several other apostles and encouraged them to remain faithful before dying around 4:00pm (an hour after reaching the home).
"	Gideon Carter	Killed	Carter was apparently killed during the charge on the Missouri militia, being shot in the chest and stabbed in the back of the head with a sword. Parley P. Pratt reported seeing a man fall with bloody face wounds, and Carter was so badly disfigured that he was assumed to be a Missourian and left on the field. He wasn't accounted for after the battle, and so it wasn't until then that his body was recovered and hastily buried (his body was reportedly exhumed and mutilated by Missourians and was reburied by the Mormons afterwards). It is possible that Carter may have been accidentally killed by a fellow Mormon by being stabbed in the head during the confusion of the charge.
"	Eli Chase	Wounded	Shot in the knee (one man was reported shot in both thighs, this may have been Chase).
"	James Hendricks	Wounded	Hendricks was shot in the neck during the battle and fell over, and was the only wounded Mormon to survive the battle who never fully recovered for his wounds, being permanently crippled. He was paralyzed from the neck down and could only speak. He was at Stephen Winchester's house during the day, accompanied by his wife Drusilla, and that night was taken to Far West.
"	Curtis Hodge	Wounded	Shot in the hip, and was one of the four badly wounded men who stopped at the Winchester home.
"	Joseph Holbrook	Wounded	Holbrook was stabbed in the left arm with a sword which fractured his elbow. His bones had to be set and his arm was stiff and useless for four months.
"	Arthur Millikan	Wounded	The exact nature of his wound is not known. In addition to the wounds of the men listed above, one man was reported shot in the arm and another in his "bowels."
"	William Seely	Wounded	Seely was one of the three Mormons held hostage by Bogart and had been placed between the two engaging units, attempted to run to the Mormon lines during the fight with the other two hostages but was shot in the left shoulder and found by the Mormons bleeding from his mouth. He had to be removed on a litter and suffered severe pain.
"	Norman Shearer	Wounded	The exact nature of his wound is not known. In addition to the wounds of the men listed above, one man was reported shot in the arm and another in his "bowels."
Missouri Militia	Moses Rowland	Killed	Rowland was shot in the back during the Mormon charge and milita's retreat, and fell down the bank into the river. He was apparently killed instantly. His death was considered murder by Judge Austin A. King and five men (including Parley P. Pratt) were committed to jail a month after the battle.
"	Mr. Clark	Wounded	Badly wounded and originally left for dead on the battlefield but apparently survived.
"	Wyatt Craven	Wounded	26-year old Craven was apparently wounded during the battle and taken prisoner. En route to Far West it was decided that he be allowed to escape, but while he was running from his guards one opened fire and shot him in the hip, although he was able to escape to Ray County despite much pain.
"	Martin Dunnaway	Wounded	
"	Thomas H. Lloyd	Wounded	
"	John Lockhart	Wounded	
"	Edwin Odell	Wounded	
"	Samuel Tarwater	Wounded	32-year old Tarwater was attacked by Mormons with swords and knives and brutally stabbed his head (with some of his brain being exposed), mouth (his lower jaw was broken and many teeth lost), and neck, leaving him bedridden for six months. He struggled with speech and memory and was the only Missouri militiaman who received a pension from the state until his death on account of his wounds.

== Aftermath ==
The battle served as a catalyst for a massive escalation of the Mormon War. Exaggerated reports of the Mormon incursion into Daviess County and of the battle (some claiming that half of Bogart's men had been lost) made their way to Missouri Governor Lilburn Boggs. He responded by issuing an executive order calling out 2,500 state militiamen to put down what he perceived to be open rebellion by the Mormons. Two days later, Governor Boggs issued an order that "the Mormons must be treated as enemies and must be exterminated or driven from the state" and directed the militia to carry this into effect.

On October 30, a mob of approximately 200 men killed 17 men and boys at Haun's Mill. Two days later, Joseph Smith and approximately 50 other church leaders were arrested. Most of these leaders were released within three weeks. In November, the rest were marched first to Independence, then to Richmond, and then to Liberty, where they were incarcerated in Liberty Jail. Joseph and Hyrum Smith were indicted by a grand jury on the charge of treason. They escaped while being transferred to Boone County.

== See also ==
- Latter Day Saint martyrs
