= David W. Patten =

American Mormon apostle (1799–1838)

Quorum of the Twelve Apostles
- February 15, 1835 – October 25, 1838

Latter Day Saint Apostle
- February 15, 1835 – October 25, 1838
- Reason: Initial organization of Quorum of the Twelve
- Reorganization at end of term: No apostles immediately ordained

Personal details
- Born: David Wyman Patten; November 14, 1799; Vermont
- Died: October 25, 1838 (aged 38); Ray County, Missouri

David Wyman Patten (November 14, 1799 – October 25, 1838) was an early leader in the Latter Day Saint movement and an original member of the Quorum of the Twelve Apostles. He was killed at the Battle of Crooked River and is regarded as a martyr by members of the Church of Jesus Christ of Latter-day Saints (Church of Jesus Christ). He is referred to twice in the Church of Jesus Christ's Doctrine and Covenants—once in section 114 and posthumously in section 124.

== Early life ==
Patten was born to Benoni and Edith Cole Patten in Vermont, and moved to Theresa, New York, as a young child. He was the 11th of 13 children. He was around 6'1" and of a dark complexion. As a youth, Patten moved to the town of Dundee in eastern Michigan. While there, at the age of 28 he married Phoebe Ann Babcock in 1828. The two had one stillborn child; they had no children live to adulthood. Patten allied himself with the local Methodist congregation during this time, all the while professing a belief that there was "no true religion on the earth."

== Conversion ==
In 1830, Patten heard about the publication of the Book of Mormon. He became "greatly agitated in mind and desired to see it." That summer, he had the opportunity to read the preface and the Testimony of the Three Witnesses that was attached to the book. Two years later, Patten learned that his brother John had recently joined the Church of Christ (the original name of the church founded by Joseph Smith). Excited, David rode three hundred miles to his brother's house in Fairplay, Indiana, to investigate the church. On June 15, 1832, Patten was baptized by his brother.

== Missions and church service ==
Patten served several short missions for the church, and was one of the first missionaries to visit the southern United States. Two days after his baptism, Patten was ordained an elder by Elisha H. Groves, and soon after sent on a mission to Michigan Territory. On this trip, he was accompanied by another recent convert, Joseph Wood. Together, the two traveled for 23 days without much food or money, instead relying on nearby families for sustenance and a place to sleep. This assignment lasted "a short season," during which time Patten baptized his wife. Healing was a distinctive feature of Patten's missionary labors. Abraham O. Smoot said that "he never knew an instance in which David's petition for the sick was not answered." Patten described some accounts of his healing: "Jesus called upon me to lay hands on [Brother] Coltrain who accidentally burned his hand and he received no harm. Brother William Smith had a pain in his eye and I laid my hand on him in the name of Jesus Christ and the pain left him."

Patten was ordained a high priest by Hyrum Smith on September 2, 1832.

At the end of 1832, several missionaries, including Patten, were sent to states on the east coast in response to a revelation received by Joseph Smith in September of the same year. Over the next few months, Patten traveled with other missionaries, including John Murdock, William Smith, Zebedee Coltrin, John F. Boynton, Hyrum Smith, and Reynolds Cahoon. Patten began preaching in Ohio and made his way to Pennsylvania, and then to New York and back to Kirtland, Ohio, the headquarters of the church. He returned home on February 15, 1833, and within a month was called on his third mission, this time to preach near Theresa, New York, where his mother and some of his siblings lived. Patten left on March 25, 1833, accompanied by Reynolds Cahoon. During their journey, the two visited congregations of church members along the way and advised them to move to Kirtland. During one of these visits, a heckler interrupted a meeting in Avon, New York, ridiculing the missionaries and refusing to be quiet. Patten told him to be quiet or he would "put him out", to which the heckler responded, "You can't do it." Patten answered "In the name of the Lord, I will" and picked the man up with both hands, took him to the back door, and reportedly threw him ten feet into a wood pile. This story became a popular tale for early members of the church.

Patten was known to sing using the gift of tongues. On February 27, 1833 Sidney Rigdon interpreted a song of Patten's and transcribed it into Revelation Book 2. Their hymn was about Enoch's vision as found in Joseph Smith's revision of Genesis. The interpreted hymn was mailed to Independence, MO where W.W. Phelps published it, unattributed, in the May 1833 edition of the Evening and Morning Star. Sometime before publication the text was adapted into a song with meter and rhyming. The original hymn was never published.

By May 1833, Patten and his companion had arrived at Theresa. They stayed their first night there at the house of Patten's brother Archibald. After remaining in Theresa and preaching for a few weeks, on May 20, 1833, Patten's mother was baptized by Brigham Young, as were two of Patten's brothers, Ira and Archibald, and two sisters, Polly and Betsy. After a while, Patten traveled south to Henderson, New York, where he preached and converted eighty people. After that, Patten returned to Kirtland. In the time following his mission, he worked on constructing the Kirtland Temple and moved his family from Michigan to Ohio.

Altogether, Patten served twelve short missions for the church in the eastern United States in 1832 and 1833 and in Tennessee with Warren Parrish in 1834. During this time, he was persecuted by mobs while establishing numerous branches of the church.

Nancy Alexander Tracy, an early member of the church who converted at age sixteen, wrote of Patten: "I could at a glance see the noble spirit he possessed beaming in his countenance, and when he began to speak it was with such force and power. Before he was half through I could have borne my testimony of the truth of the gospel and doctrine he was preaching."

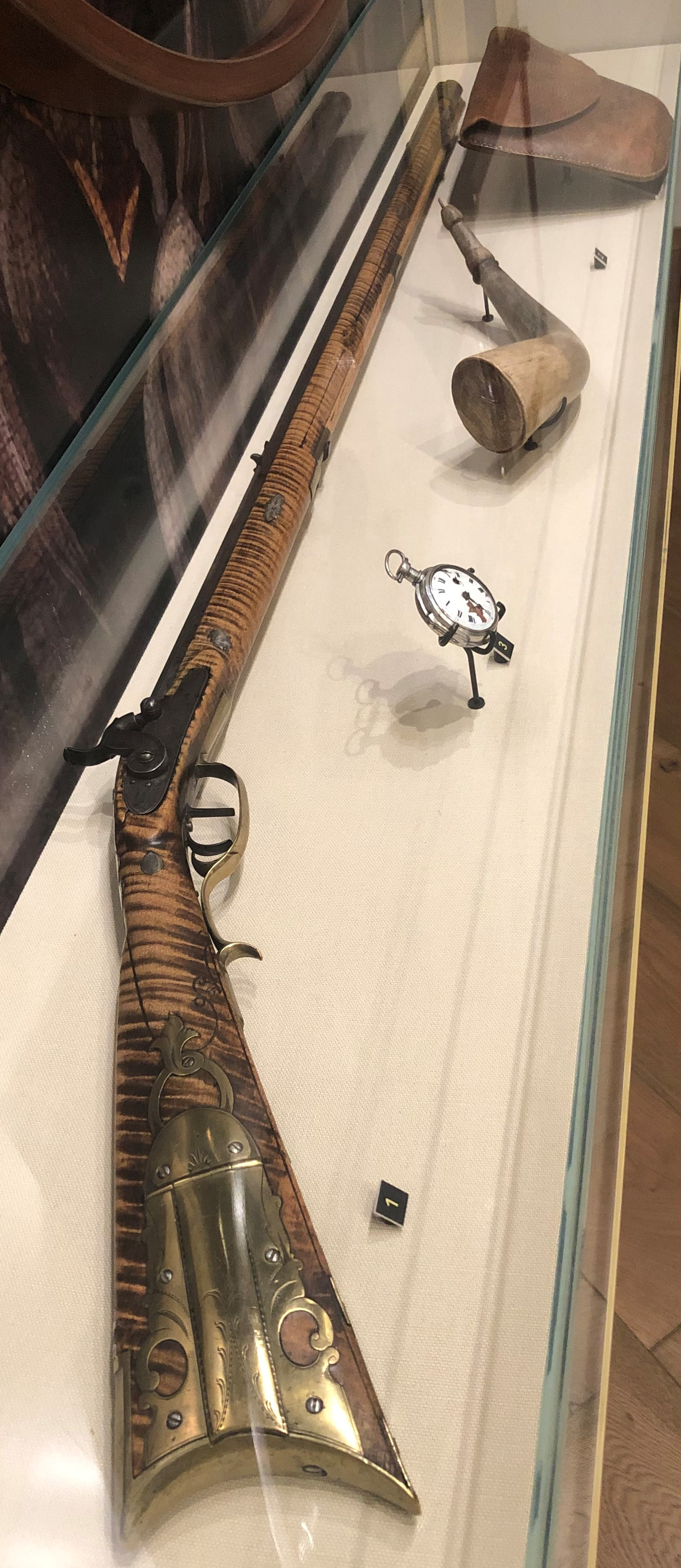
Rifle, shot pouch, powder horn, and pocket watch carried by Patten into the battle of Crooked River. Rifle is made of curly maple wood.

== Apostleship ==
Patten became one of the original apostles of the Church of the Latter Day Saints on February 15, 1835, receiving his ordination from Oliver Cowdery, David Whitmer, and Martin Harris, jointly known as the Three Witnesses. He served as an apostle from 1835 until his death in 1838.

In late 1836, Patten settled in Far West, Missouri. On February 10, 1838, Thomas B. Marsh and Patten were called to serve as Presidents pro tempore of the church in Missouri until the president of the church, Joseph Smith, and his counselor Sidney Rigdon returned. Later that year, on April 6, 1838, when Marsh was called to be President pro tempore of the church by himself, Patten was appointed to be Marsh's assistant; fellow apostle Brigham Young also served as an assistant to Marsh. Latter Day Saints in Missouri began to refer to Patten by the nickname "Captain Fear-Not."

Doctrine and Covenants section 114, delivered April 17, 1838, is directed to Patten, in which he is called to serve another mission.

== Story of meeting Cain ==
Patten is reportedly the source of a story which has become a part of Mormon folklore. As related by Abraham O. Smoot after Patten's death, Patten says he encountered a very tall, hairy, dark-skinned man in Paris, Tennessee, who said that he was Cain. The account states that Cain, the son of Adam from the Bible, had earnestly sought death but was denied it, and that his mission was to destroy the souls of men.

The recollection of Patten's story is quoted in Spencer W. Kimball's The Miracle of Forgiveness. In the 1980s, Patten's story was used by some Latter-day Saints to explain Bigfoot sightings in South Weber, Utah.

== Battle of Crooked River ==
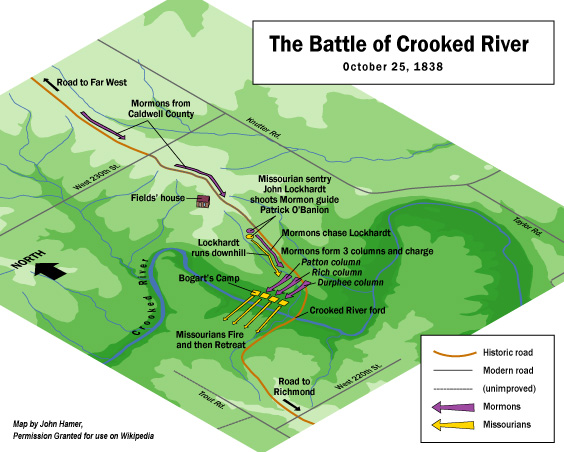
A map of the Battle of Crooked River.

Patten died due to wounds received in the Battle of Crooked River. This conflict was primarily caused by deteriorating conditions between Mormon settlers and other religious groups in Missouri. As tensions between Mormon and non-Mormon groups increased, a group of men from the state militia abducted three Mormon men on October 24, 1838. In response, Patten led a group of Mormon men to rescue the men. Before daybreak on the 25th, as the Mormon militia approached the ford where the state militia was camped, a non-Mormon guard, John Lockhart, called out, "Who goes there?" and immediately fired at the Mormons. The shot hit Patrick O'Bannion, one of Patten's guides, and mortally wounded him. Crying, "God and liberty," Patten ordered a charge and led the Mormon militia in the attack. Patten, who was serving as commander of the Mormon militia group, was shot in the bowels. The three men who had been held by the state militia were rescued.

The wounded Patten was carried from the battlefield to the home of Stephen Winchester, four miles distant. En route he was visited by Joseph Smith, Hyrum Smith, and his wife. Patten reiterated his testimony of the church to his visitors. Upon seeing her husband dying, Ann Patten exclaimed, "Oh God! Oh my husband! How pale you look." His final words to his wife were, "Whatever you do else, O do not deny the faith," after which he addressed the others in the room. Moments after this, about 10 p.m., he died. Regarding Patten's death, Joseph Smith said, "There lies a man who has done just as he said he would—he has laid down his life for his friends." Patten was buried in an unmarked grave on October 27, 1838, in Far West, Missouri.

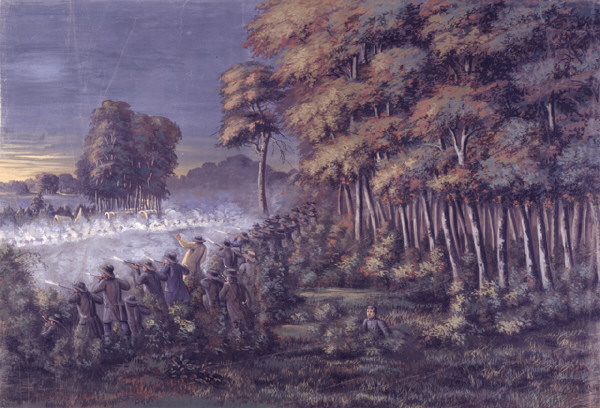
A painting of the Battle of Crooked River

== Legacy ==
After Patten's death, the Quorum of the Twelve Apostles did not have twelve apostles again until 1841, when Lyman Wight was ordained. Between Patten’s death and Wight's ordination, John E. Page, John Taylor, Wilford Woodruff, George A. Smith, and Willard Richards had been ordained and added to the Quorum to replace Patten and apostles who had been excommunicated.

Shortly after the Battle of Crooked River, Missouri Executive Order 44 was issued by Missouri Governor Lilburn W. Boggs. Only days later, the Latter Day Saints living in the community of Haun's Mill were attacked by a mob and experienced many casualties. These events ultimately led to the expulsion of the Latter Day Saints from Missouri.

After Patten's death, Wilford Woodruff lionized Patten as a martyr and ascribed unspecified miraculous healings to his administration. In Doctrine and Covenants section 124, a revelation states, "David Patten I have taken unto myself; behold, his priesthood no man taketh from him."

== See also ==
- Latter Day Saint martyrs

Church of the Latter Day Saints titles Renamed Church of Jesus Christ of Latter Day Saints in 1838
Preceded by Thomas B. Marsh	Quorum of the Twelve Apostles; February 15, 1835–October 25, 1838	Succeeded by Brigham Young
