= List of historic sites of the Church of Jesus Christ of Latter-day Saints =

The Church of Jesus Christ of Latter-day Saints holds a number of sites as historically significant. This list is intended as a quick reference for these sites. The sites may or may not be owned by the church.

In addition, independent historic registries have recognized a number of current or formerly church-associated properties, such as the L.D.S. Ward Building in Lava Hot Springs, Idaho, listed on the U.S. National Register of Historic Places.

== Northeast ==
=== Palmyra ===
Hill Cumorah Visitors' Center

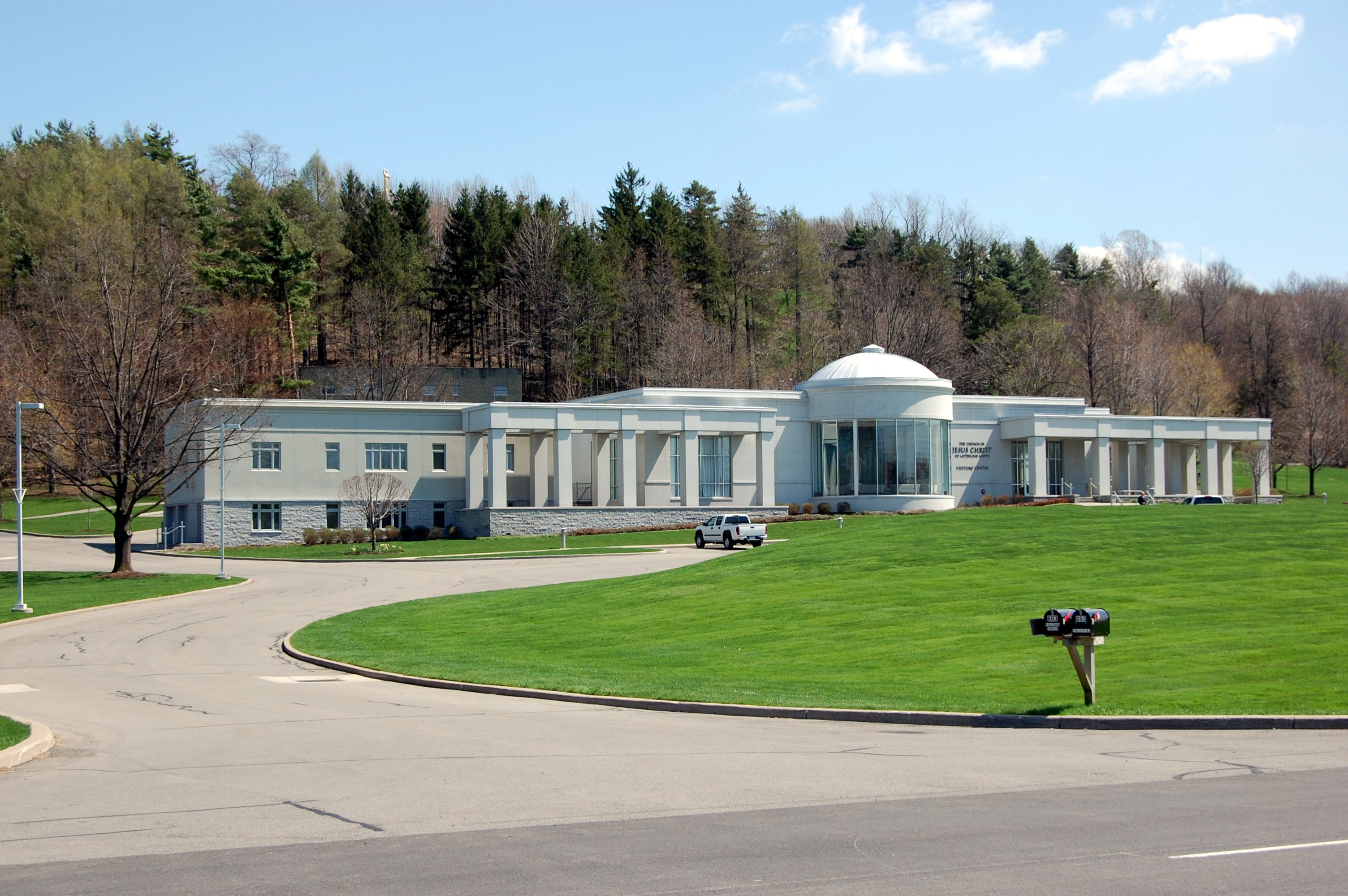

Book of Mormon Historic Publication Site

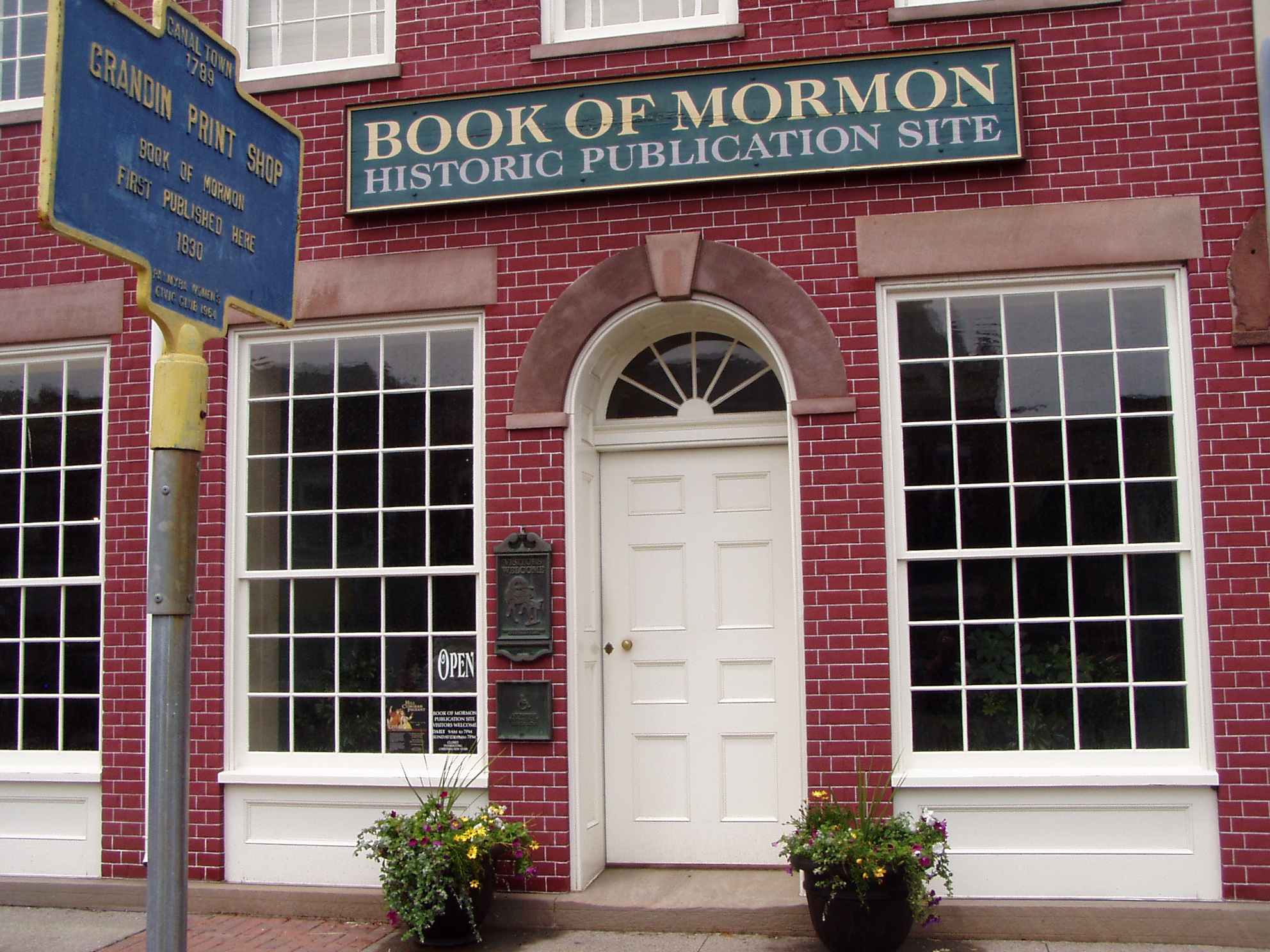

Smith Family Farm

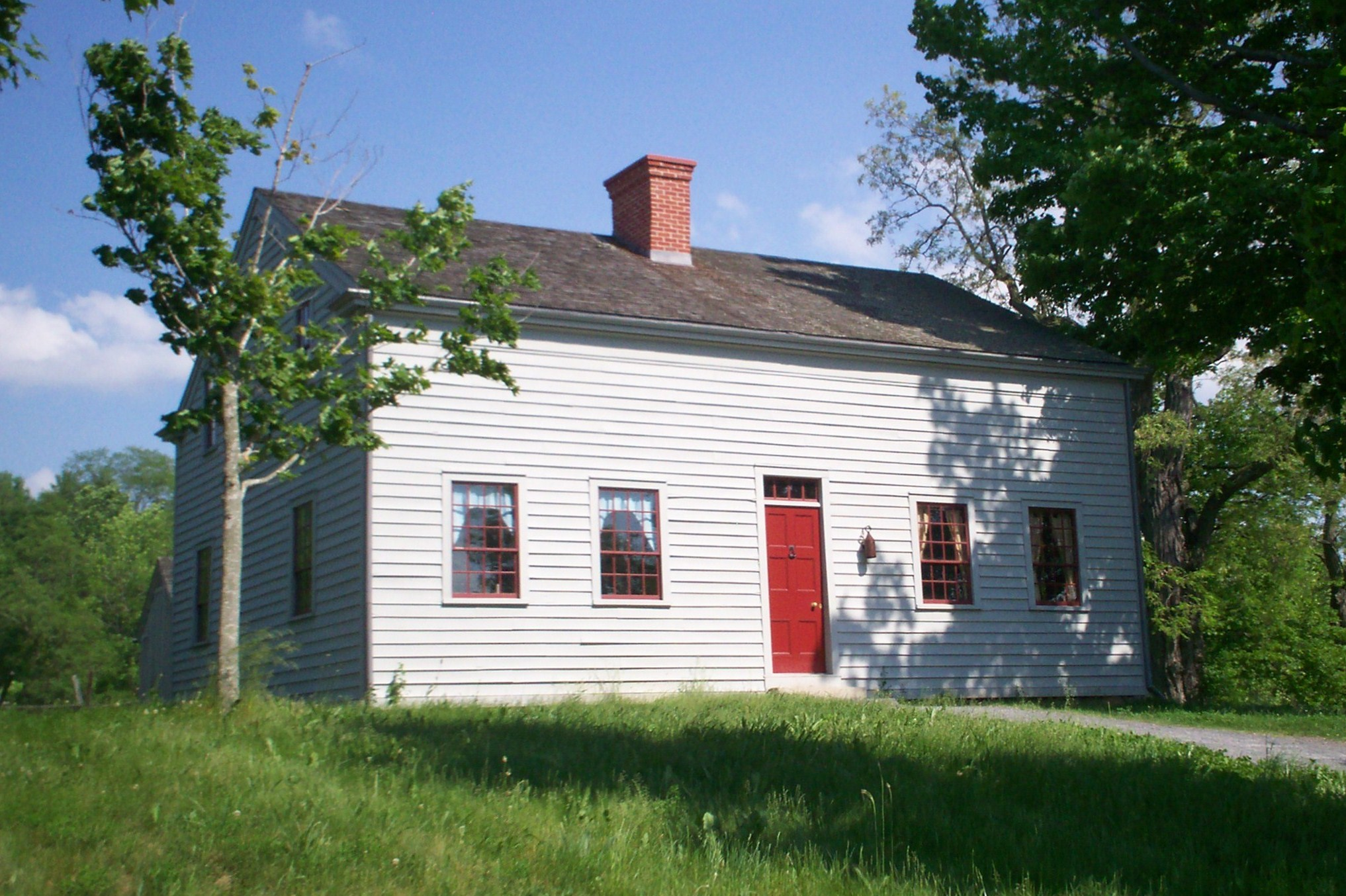

Sacred Grove

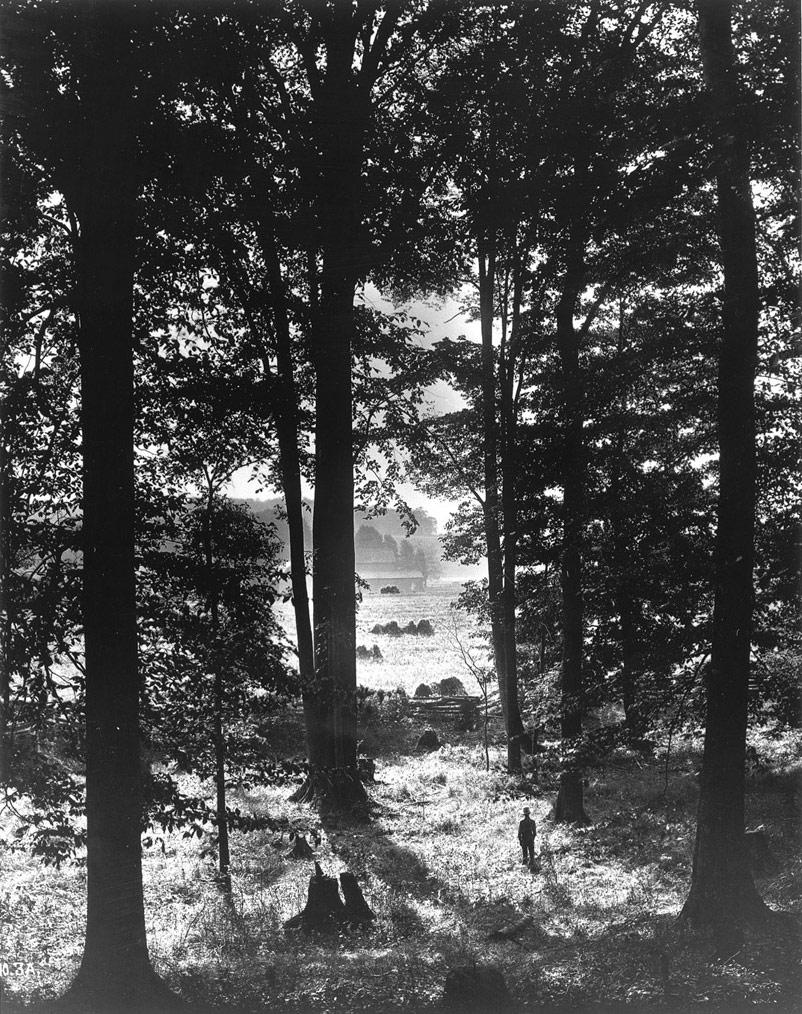

=== Kirtland ===
Kirtland Temple
Historic Kirtland Village
Includes:
- Newel K. Whitney Store
- Newel K. Whitney Home

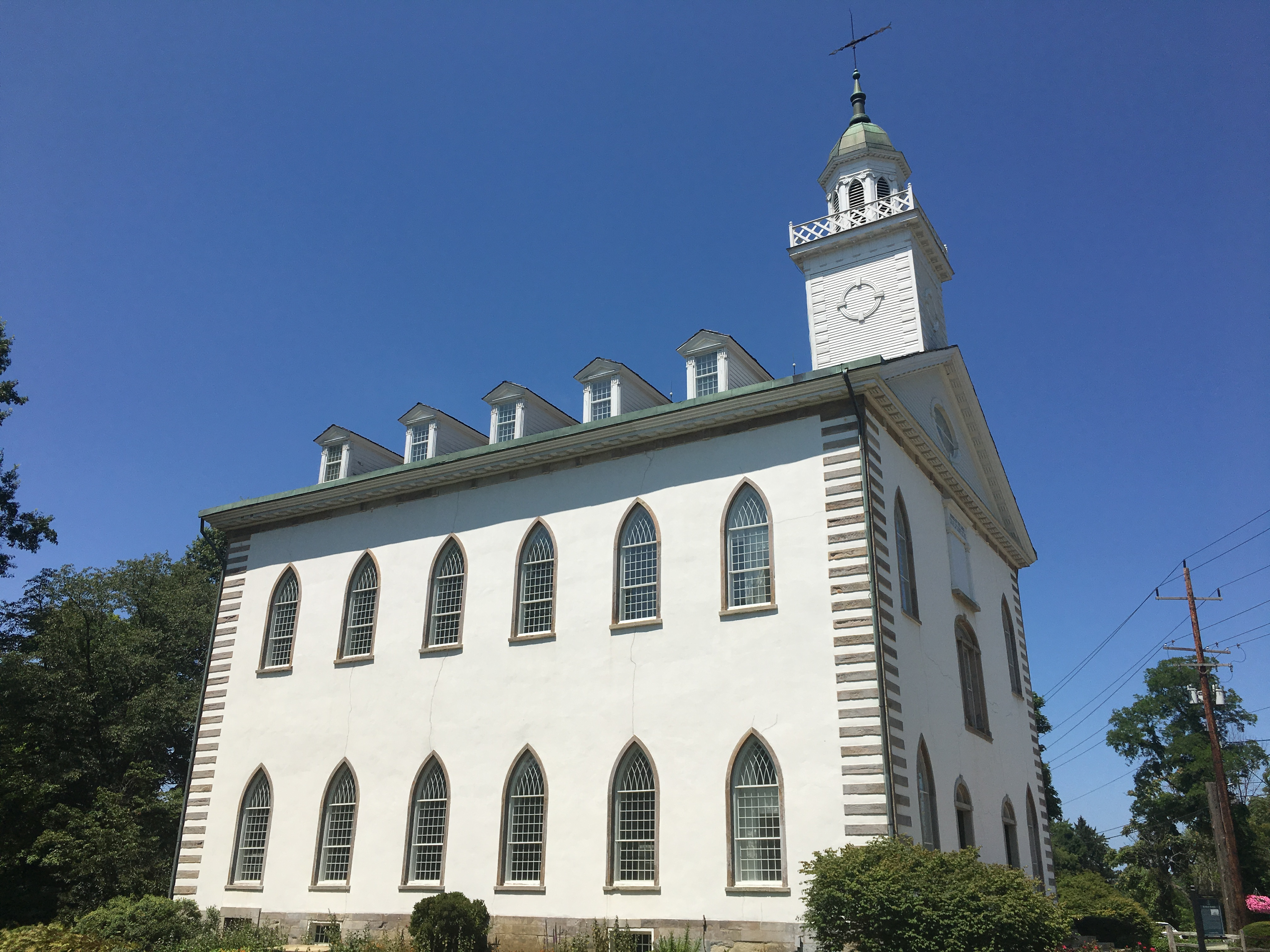

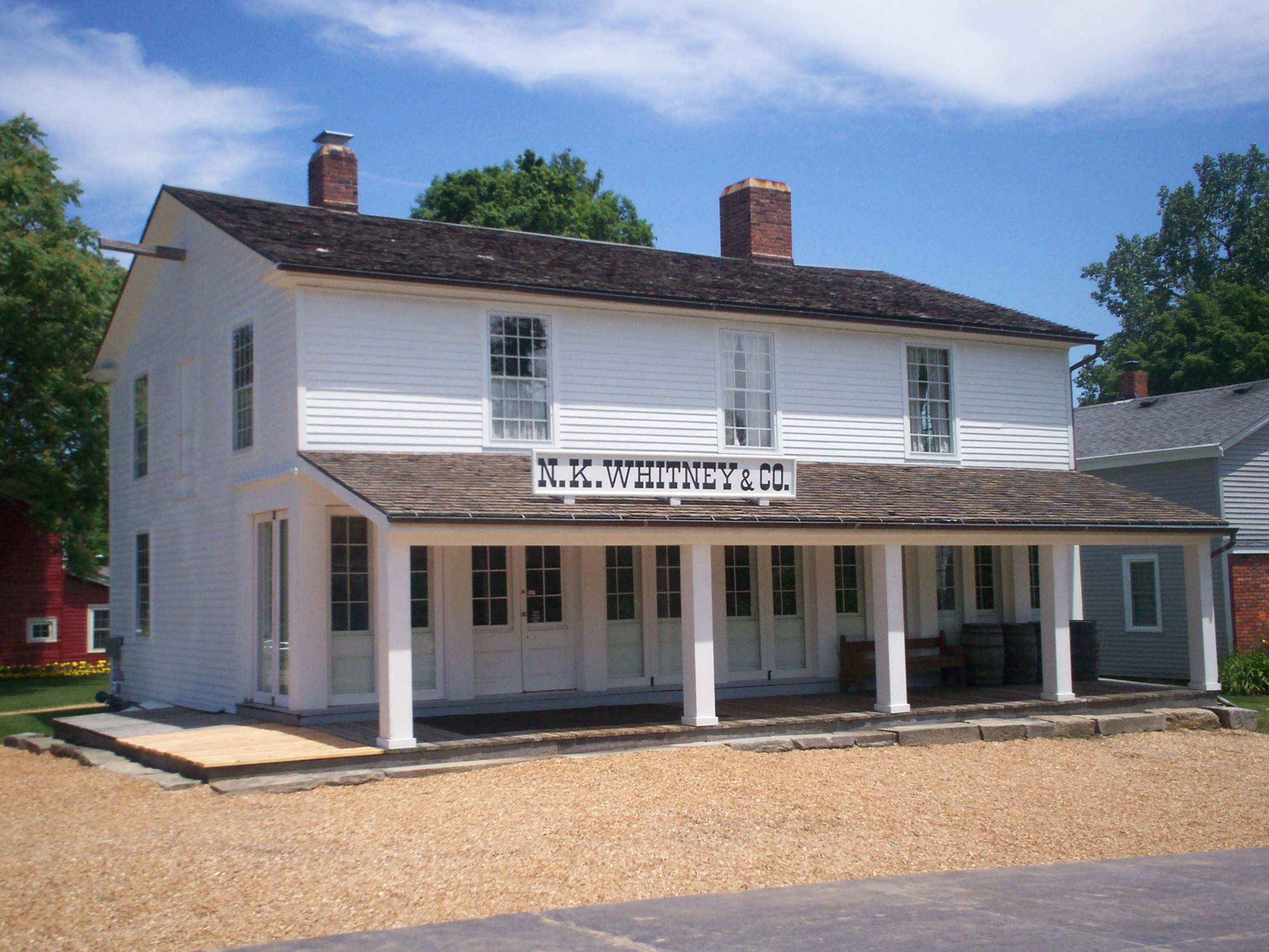

Whitney Store

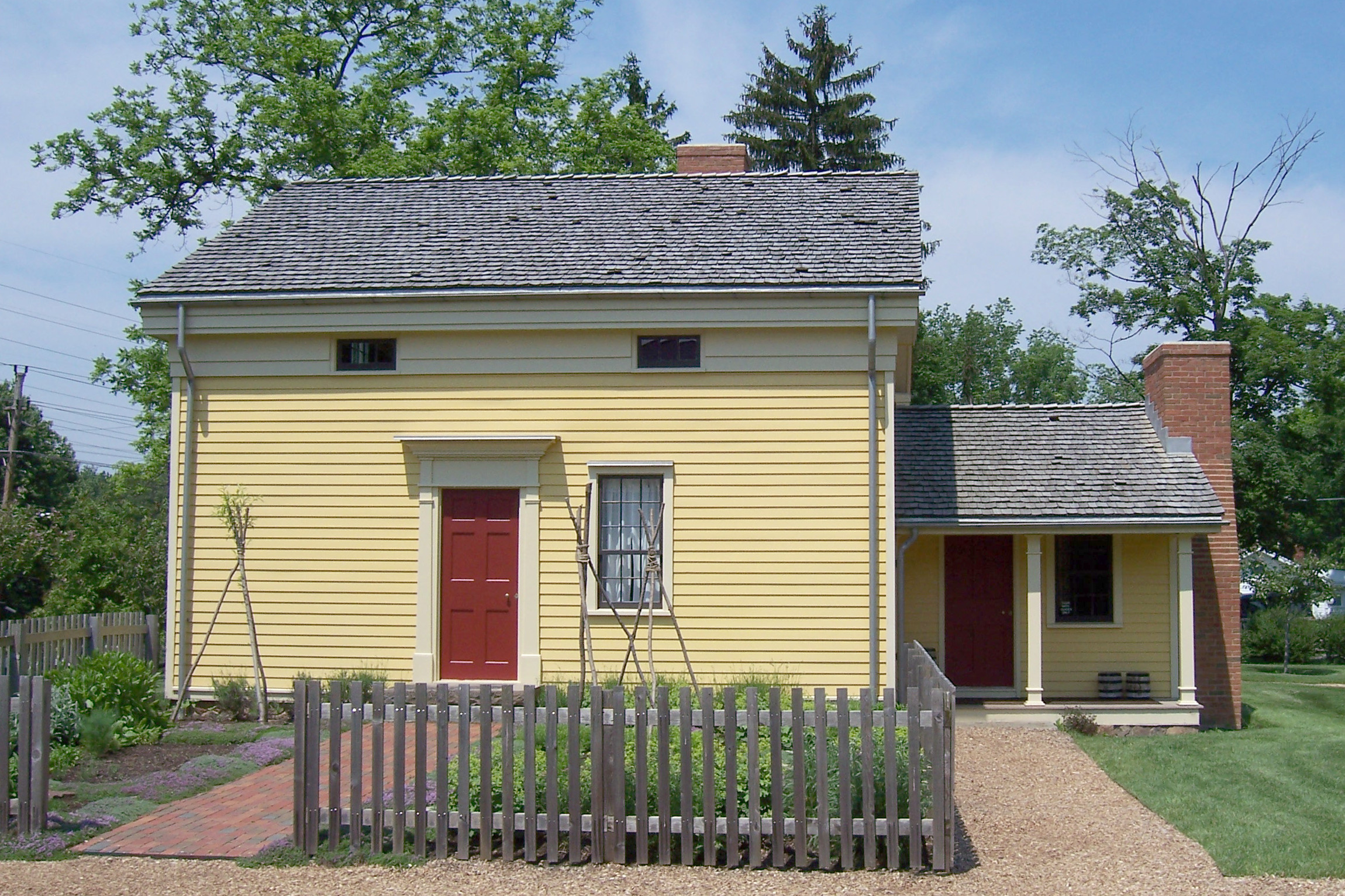

Whitney Home

=== Other Northeast ===
John Johnson Farm

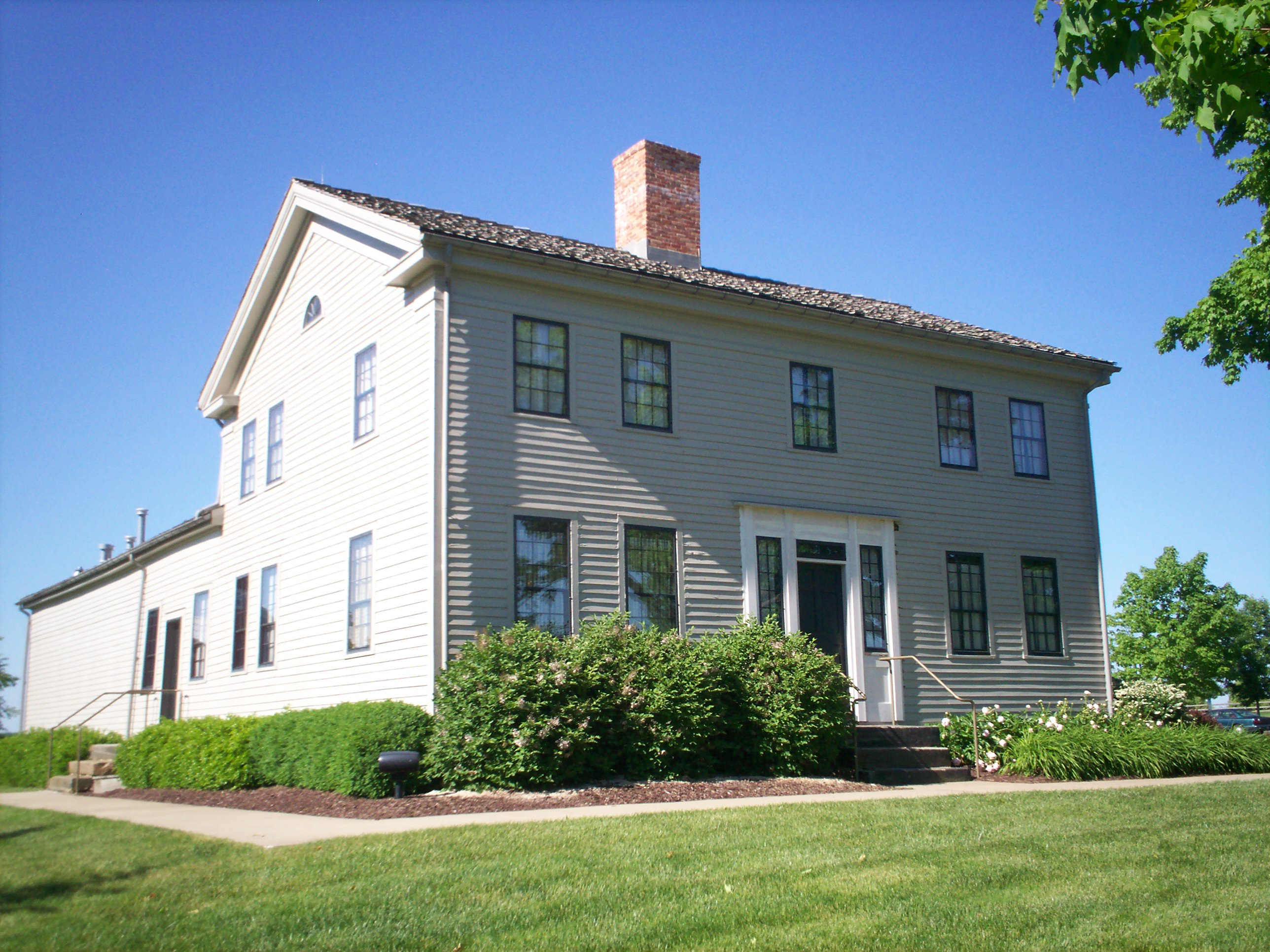

Joseph Smith Birthplace Memorial

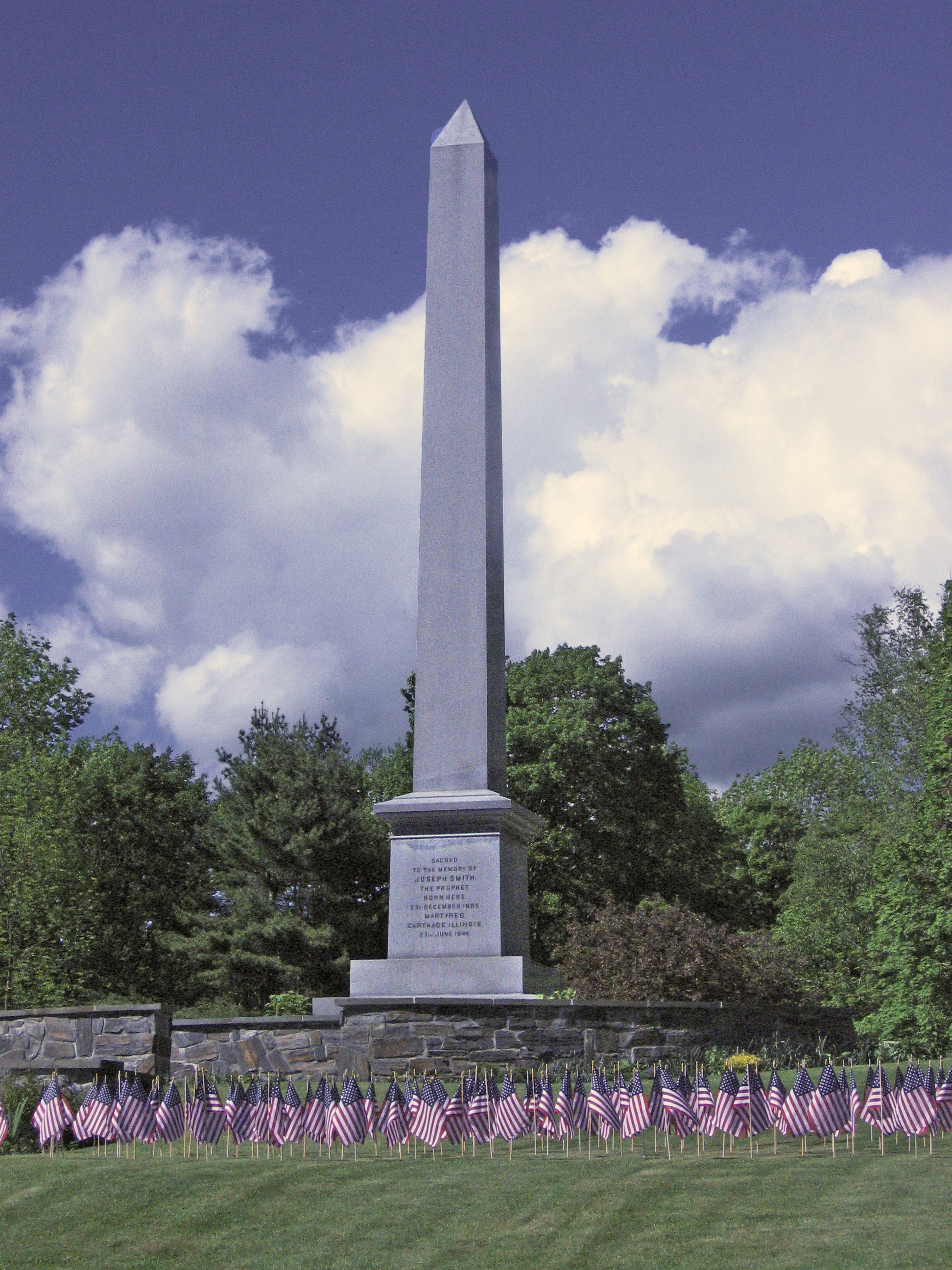

Peter Whitmer log home

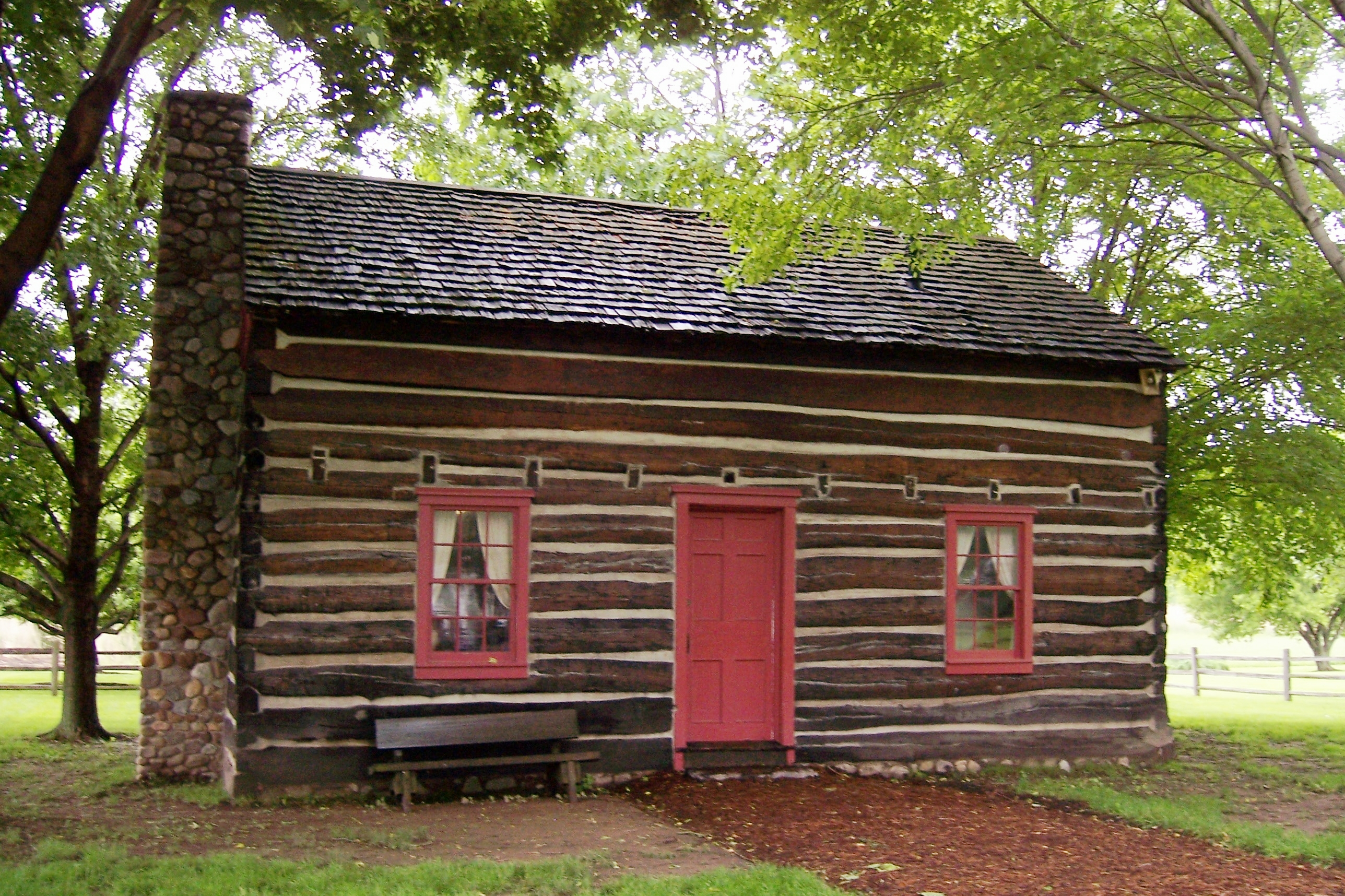

Priesthood Restoration Site

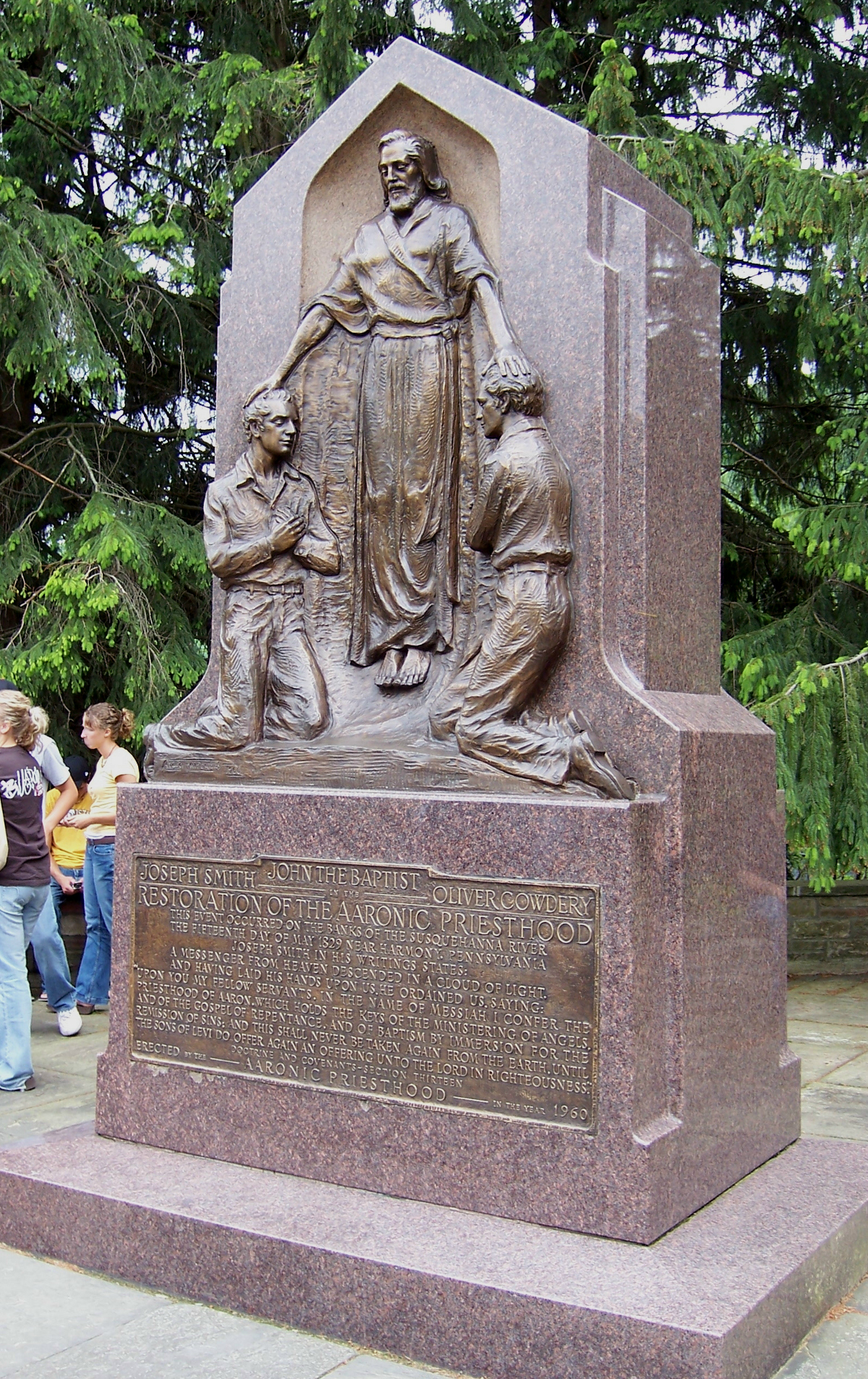

Susquehanna River

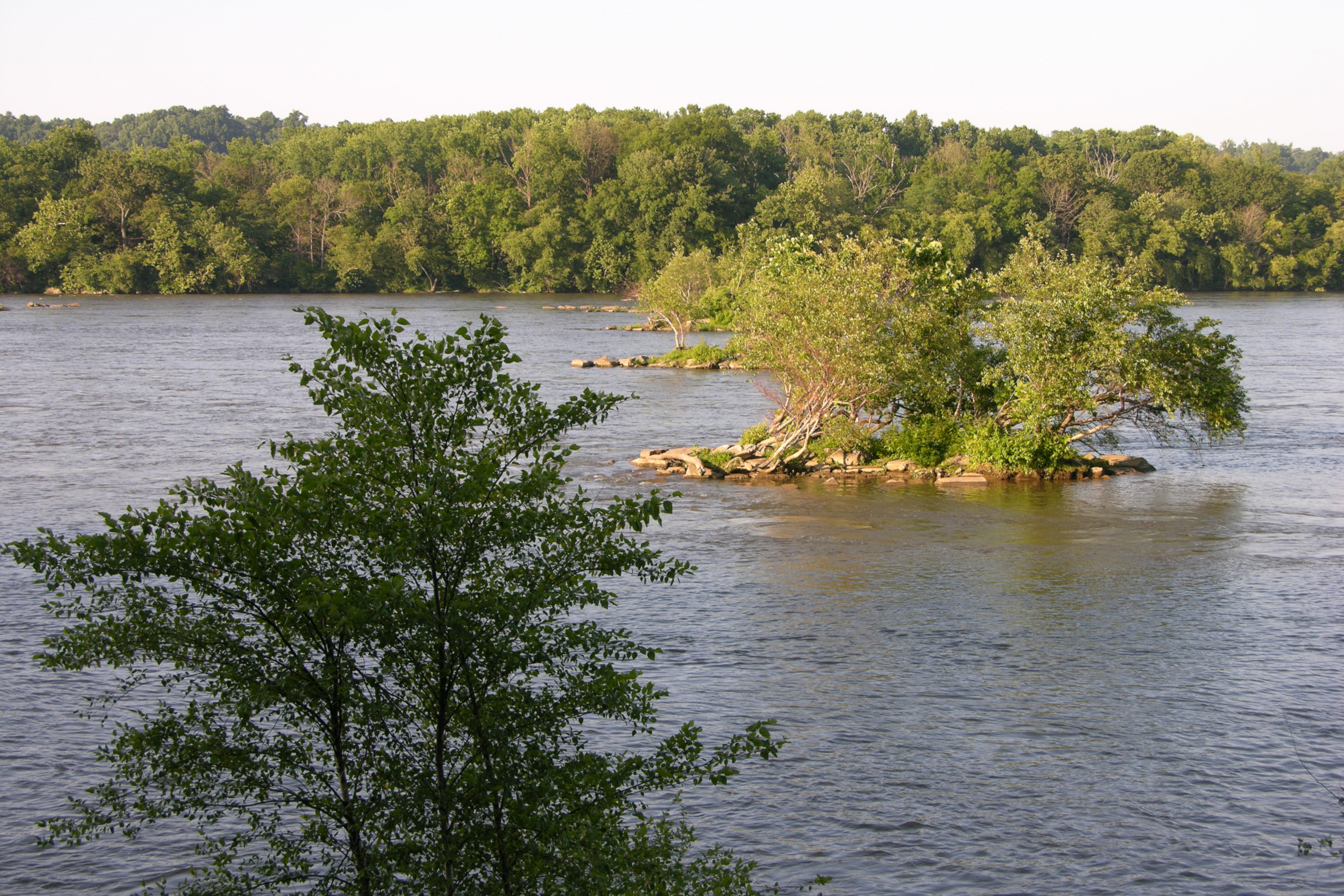

Washington D.C. Temple Visitors' Center

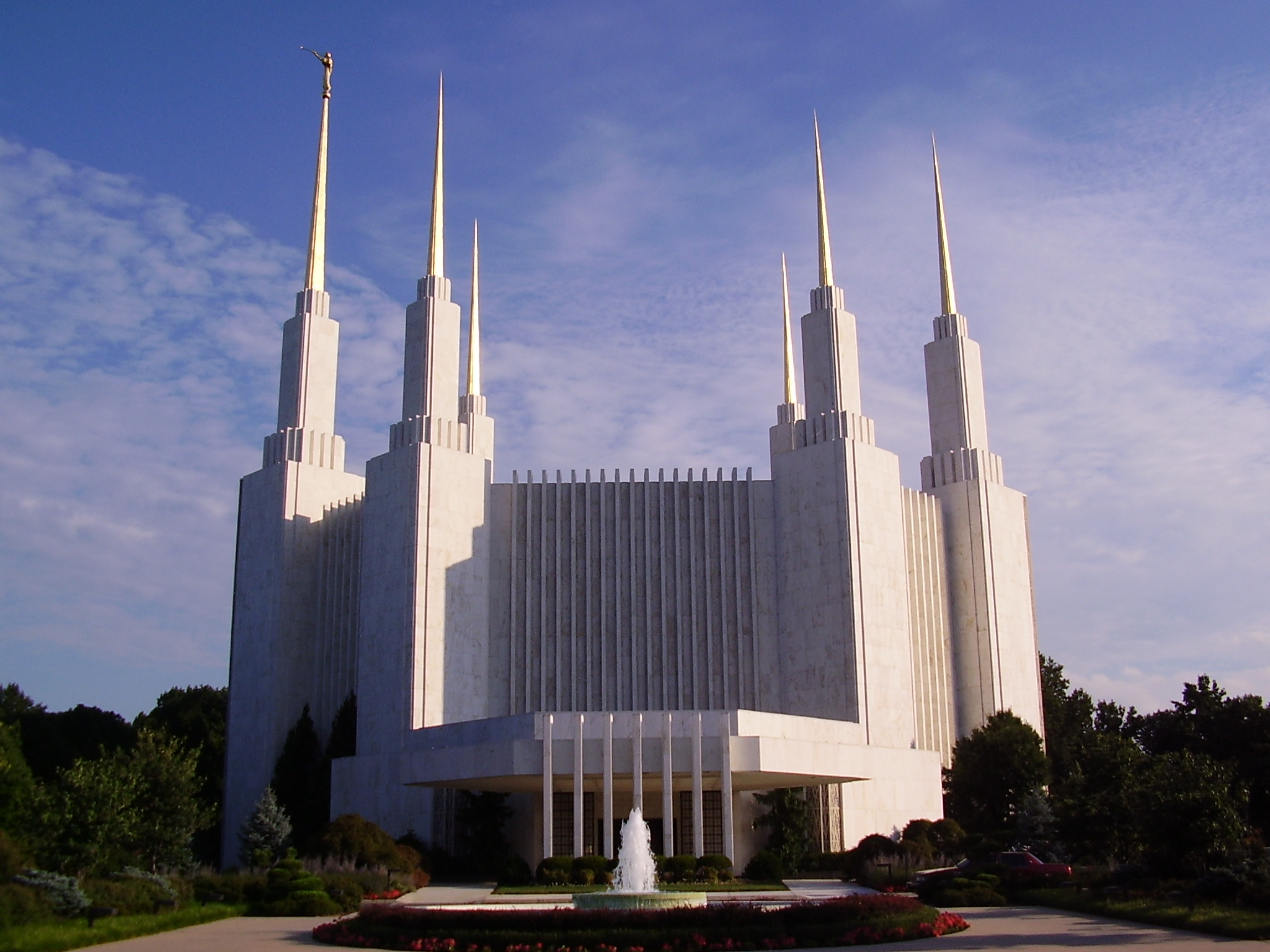

Washington D.C. Temple

== Midwest ==
=== Nauvoo ===
Nauvoo Temple / Nauvoo Illinois Temple and Visitors' Center
Red Brick Store

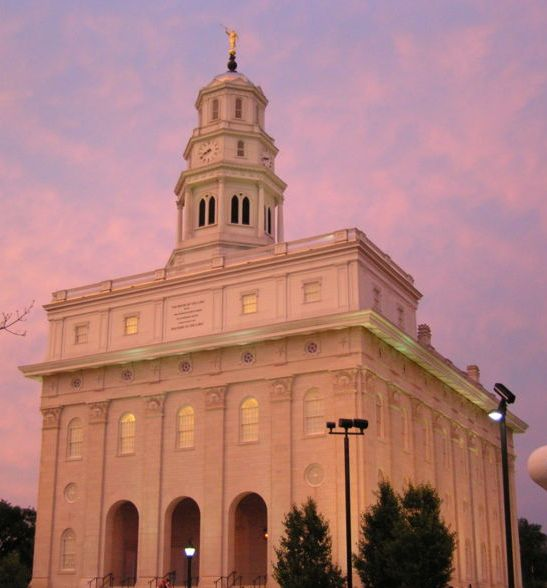

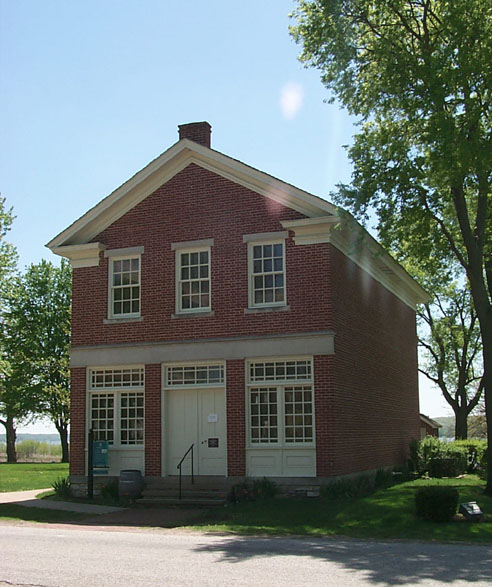

=== Missouri ===
Adam-ondi-Ahman

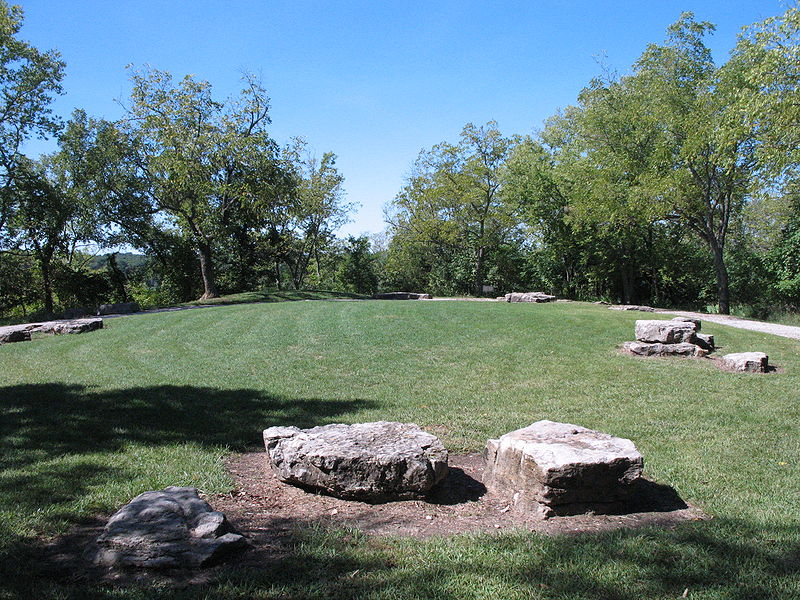

Far West Temple Site

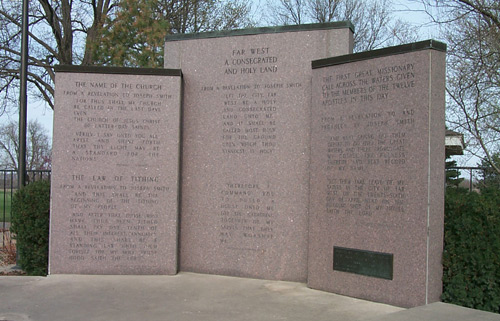

Hawn's Mill

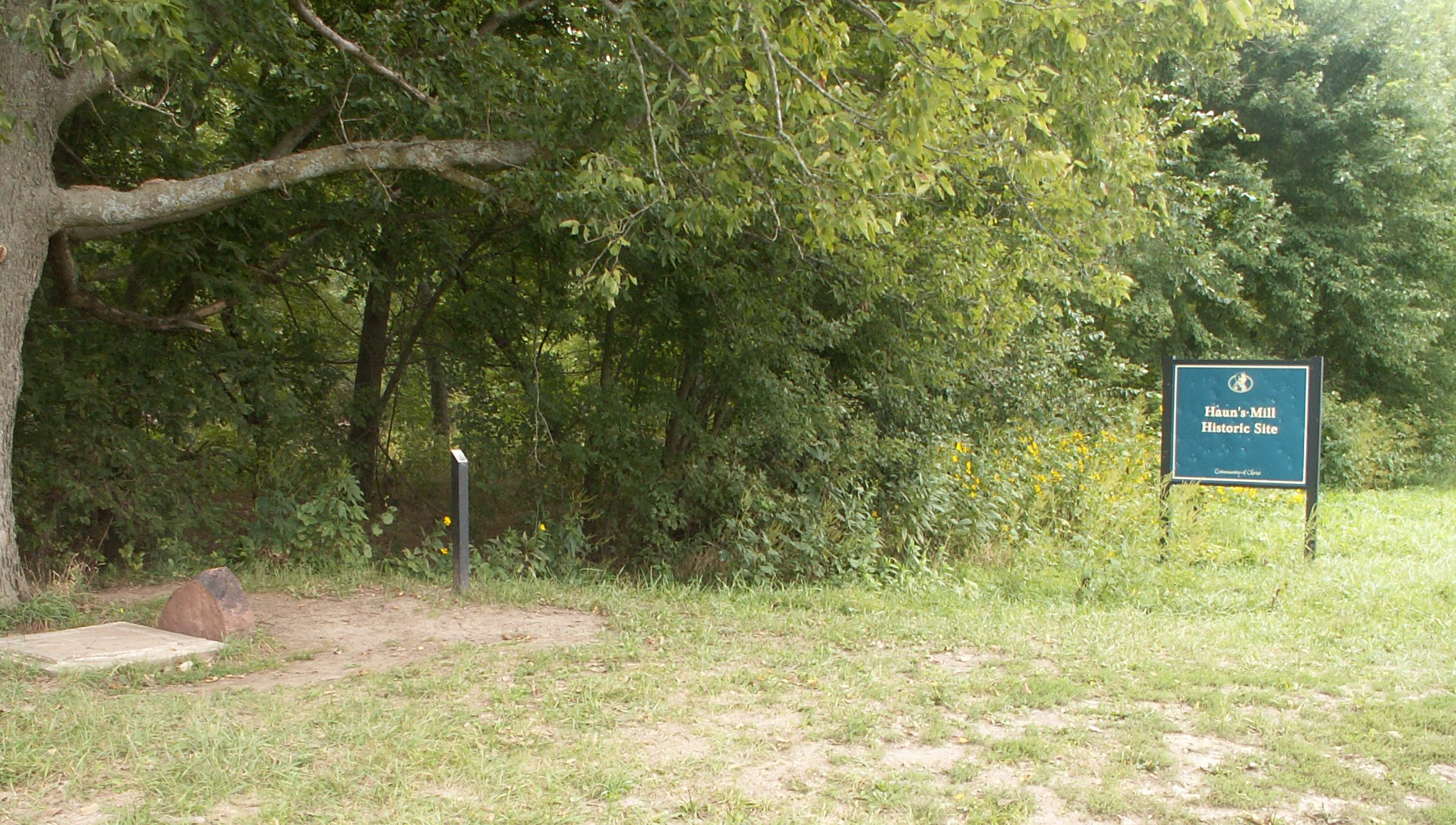

Independence Visitors' Center

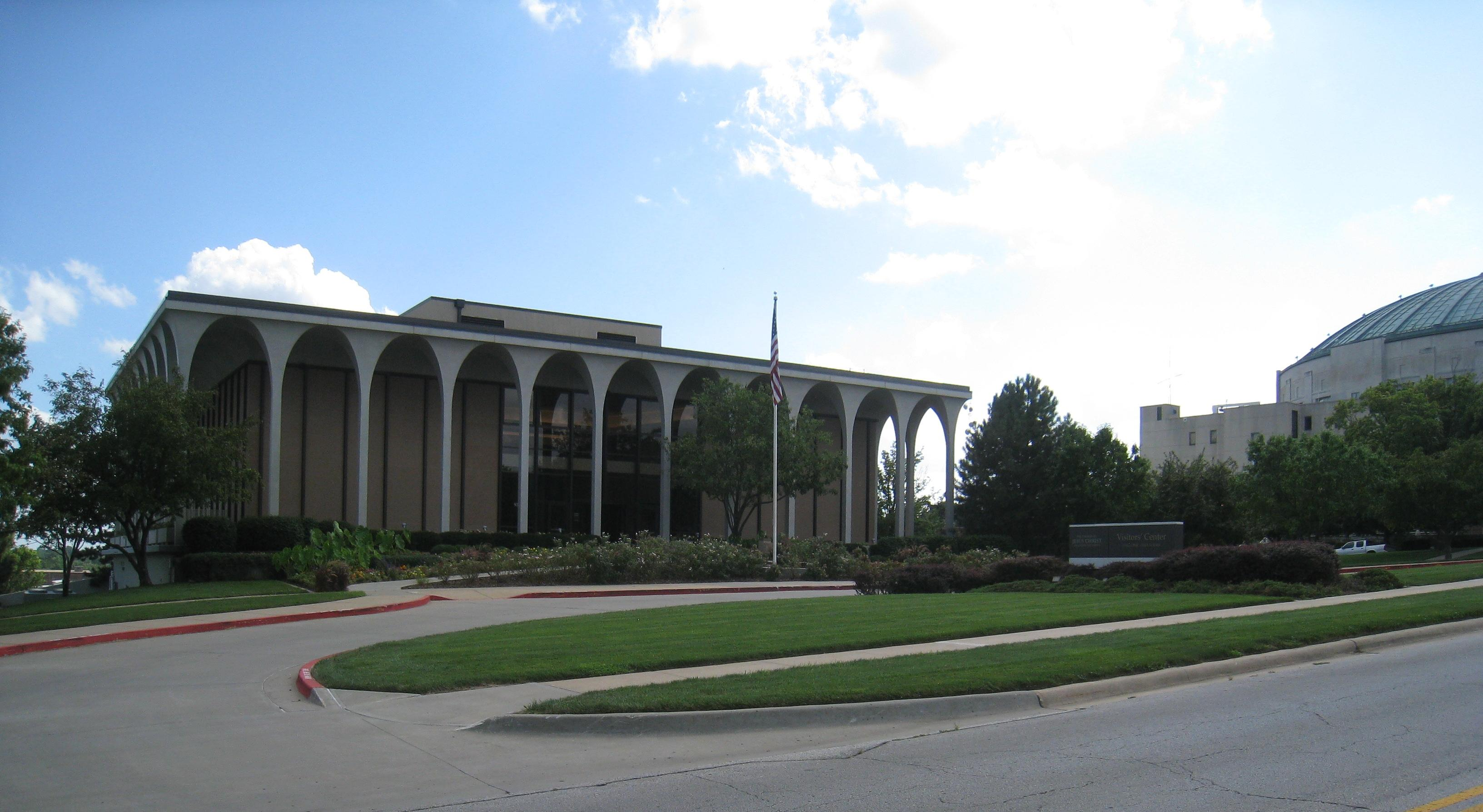

Liberty Jail

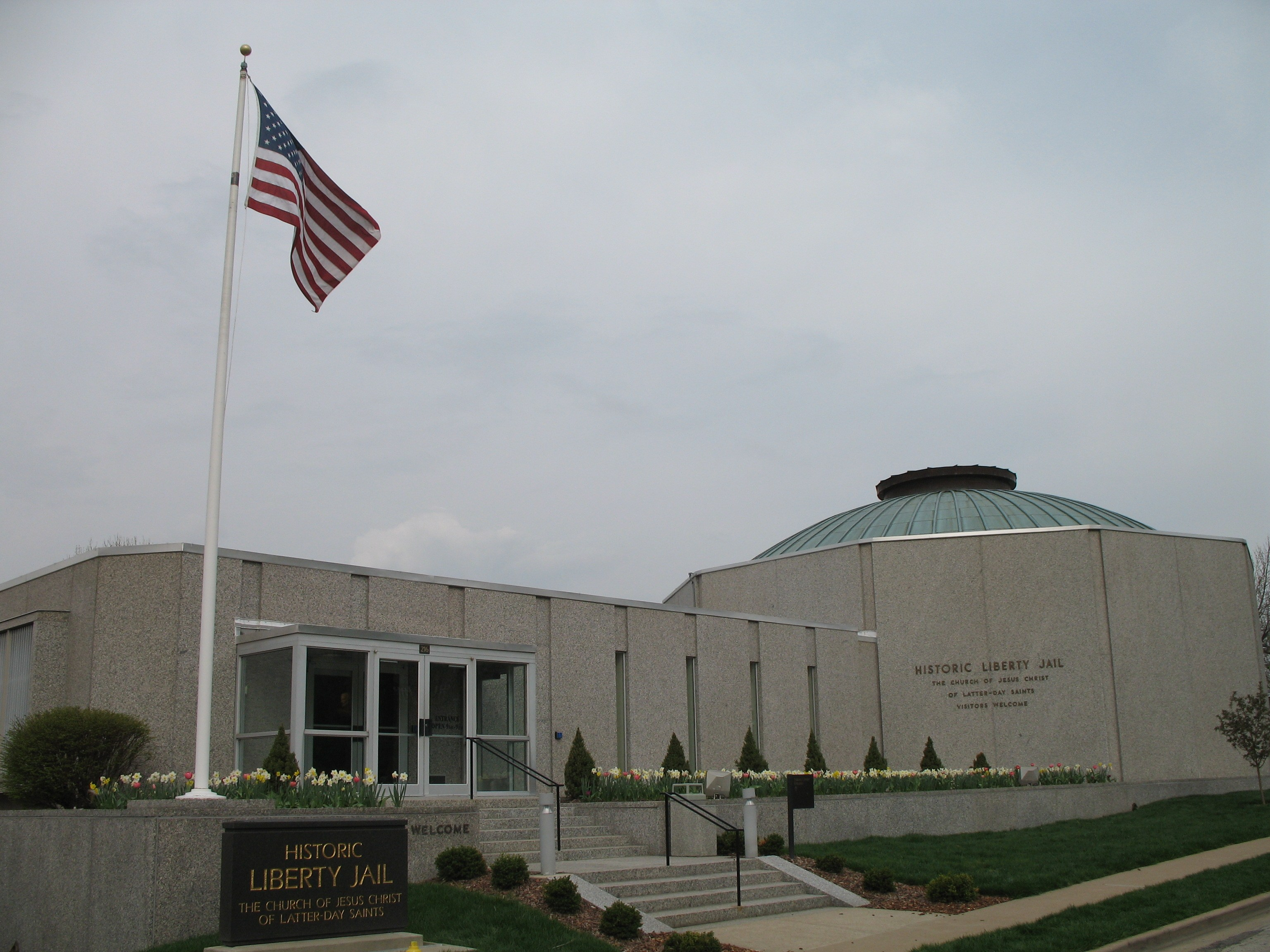

Independence (Zion) Temple Lot

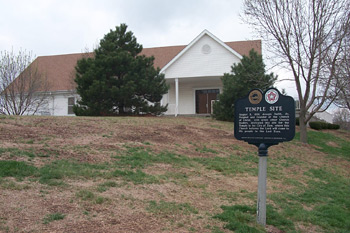

=== Other Midwest ===
Carthage Jail

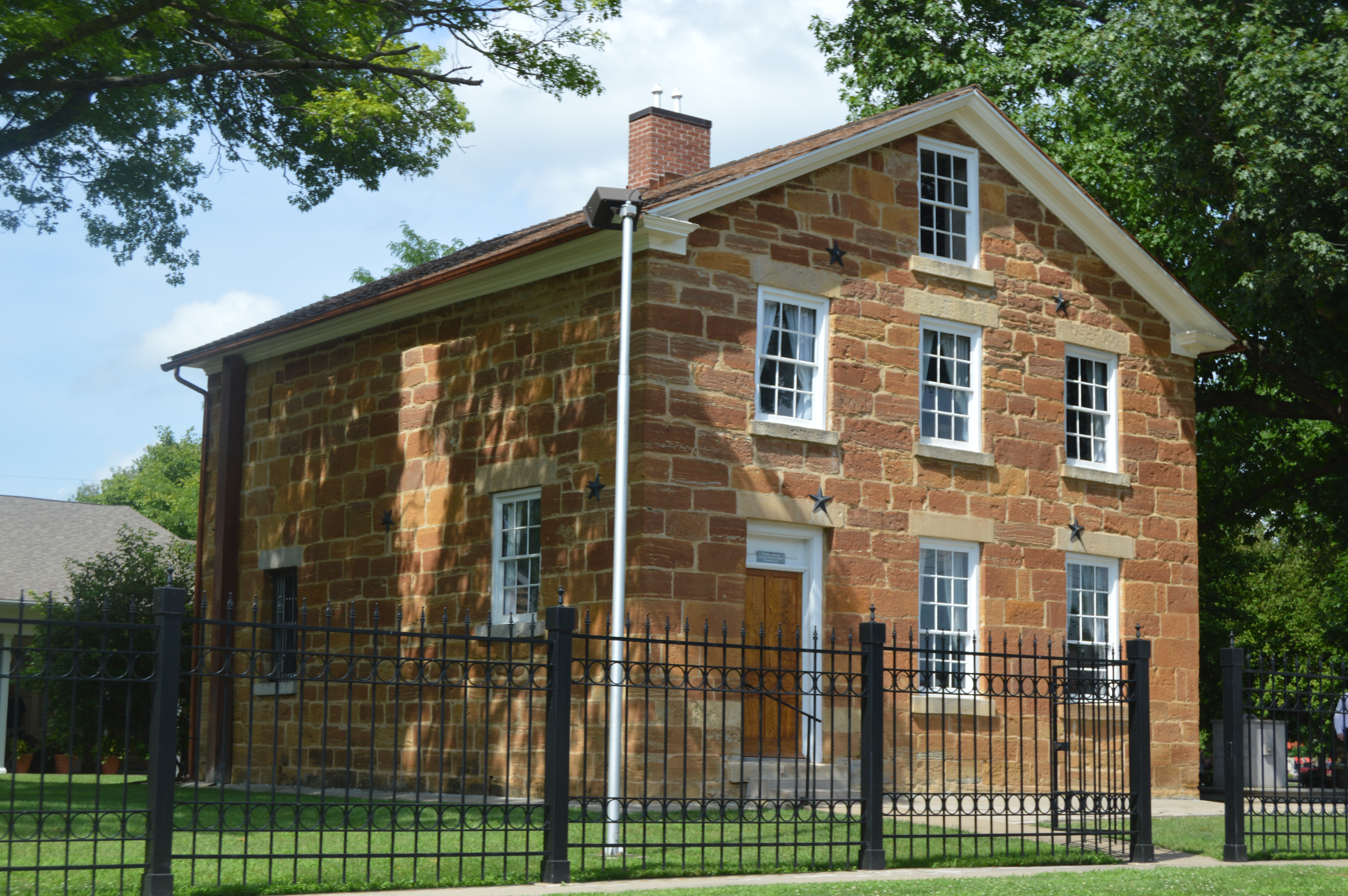

Mount Pisgah, Iowa

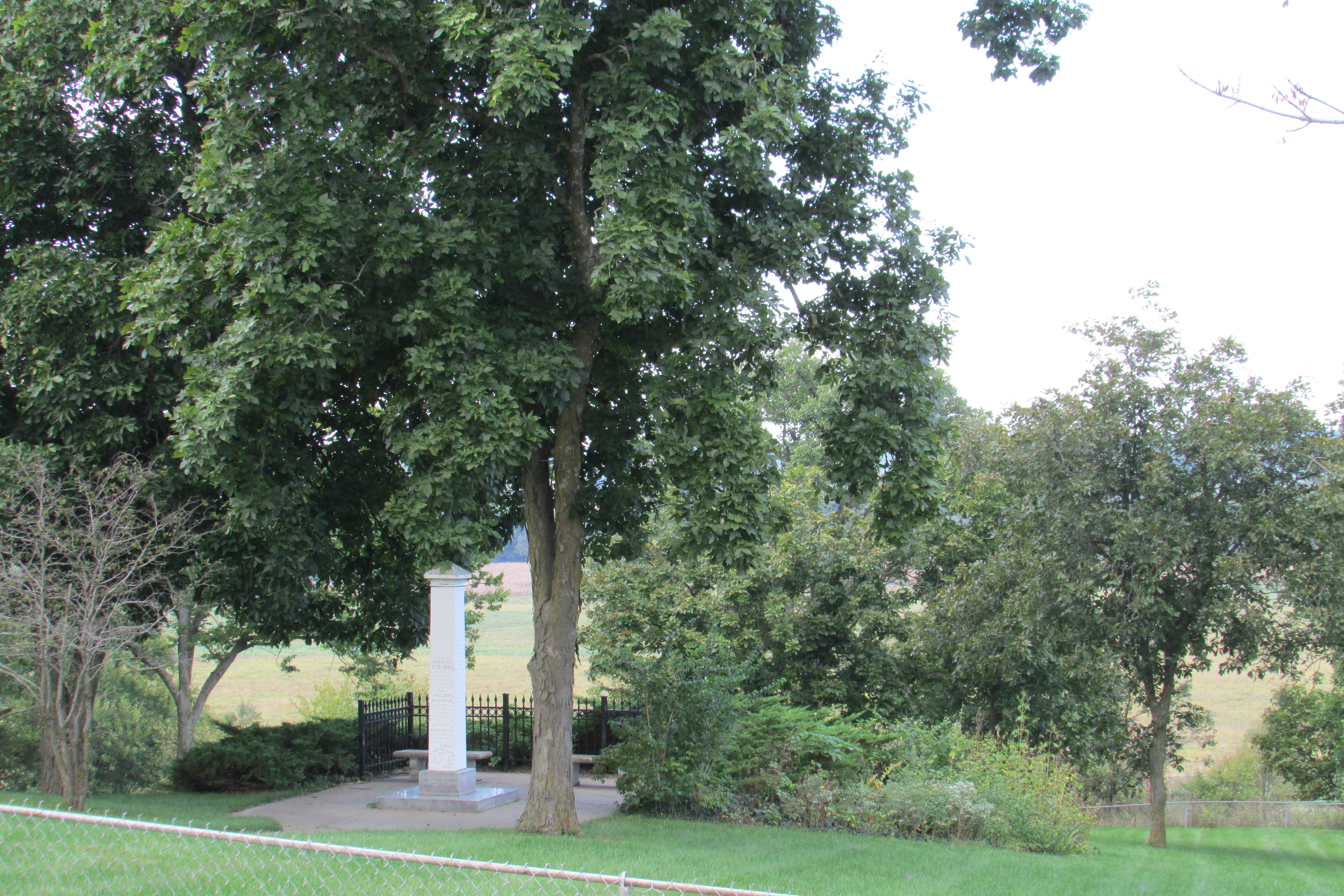

Kanesville Tabernacle (Council Bluffs, Iowa)

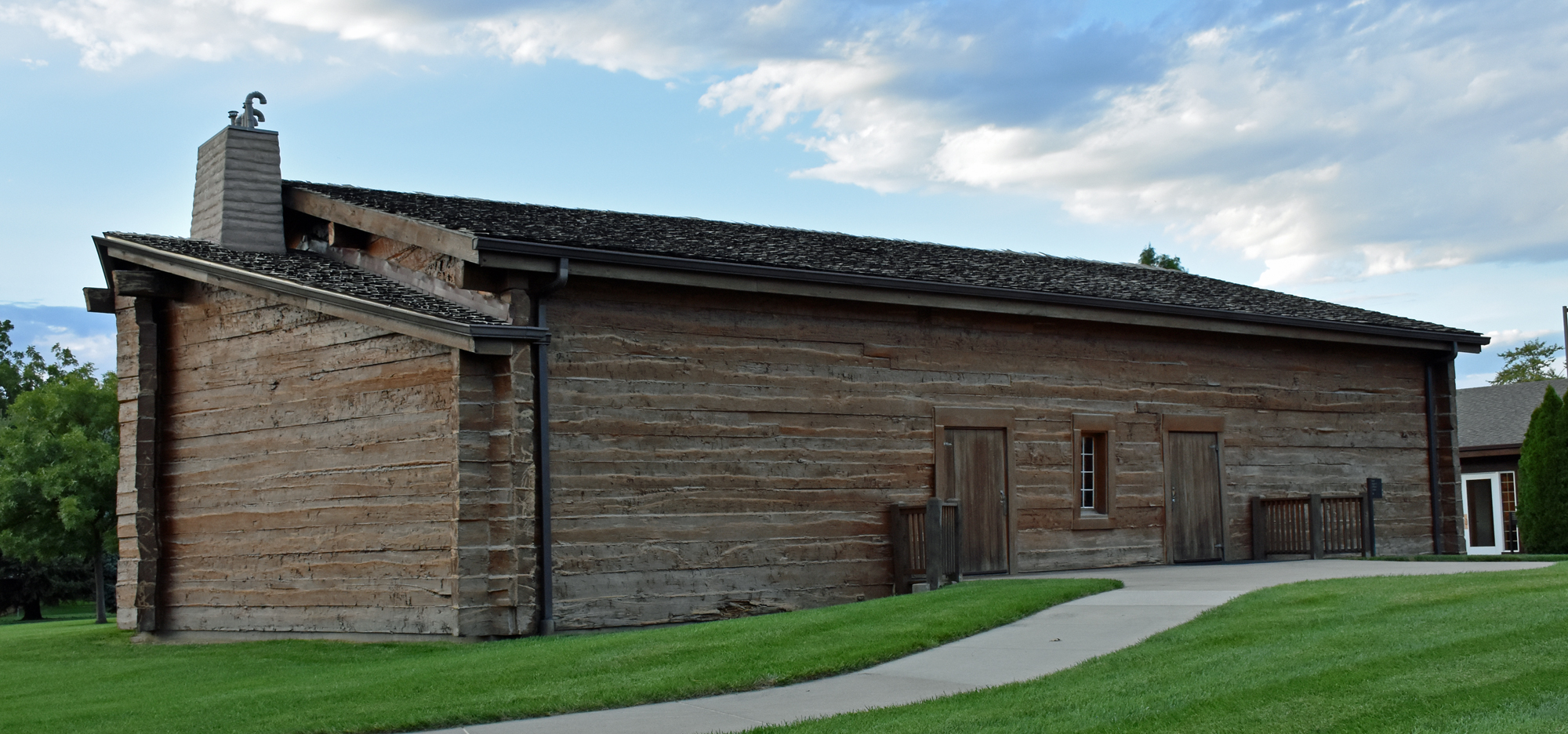

Winter Quarters, Nebraska

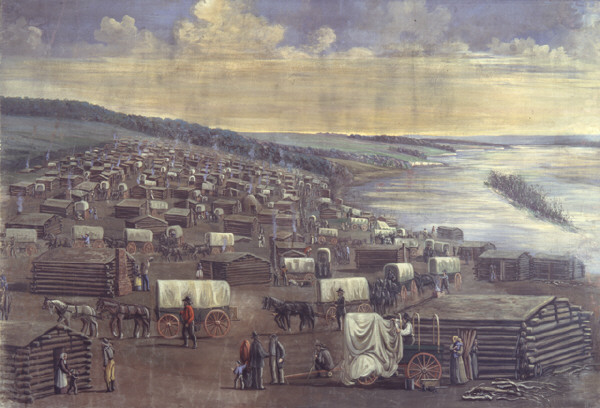

Mormon Trail Center (Omaha, Nebraska)

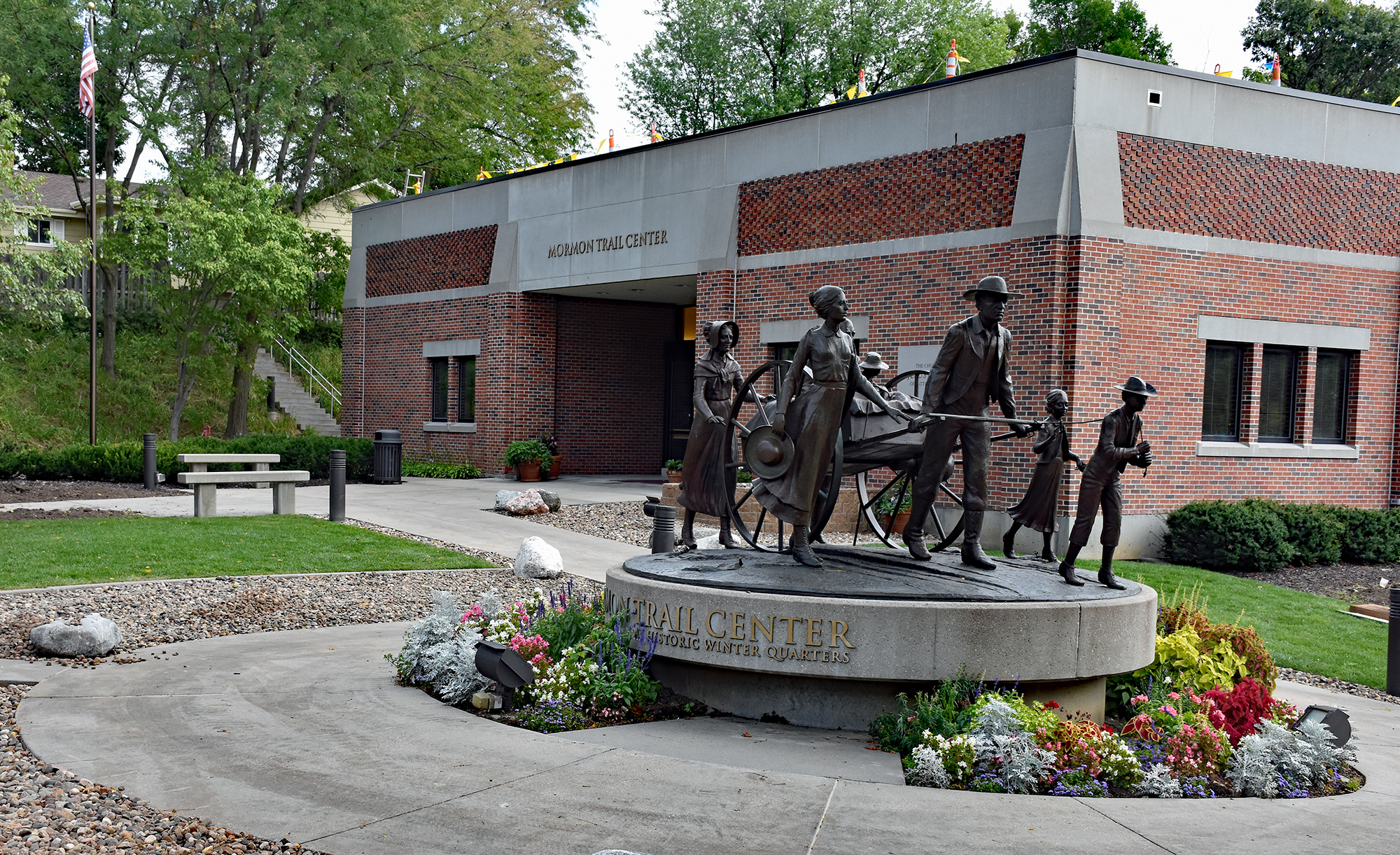

== West ==
=== Salt Lake City ===
Brigham Young Complex
Includes:
- Beehive House
- Lion House

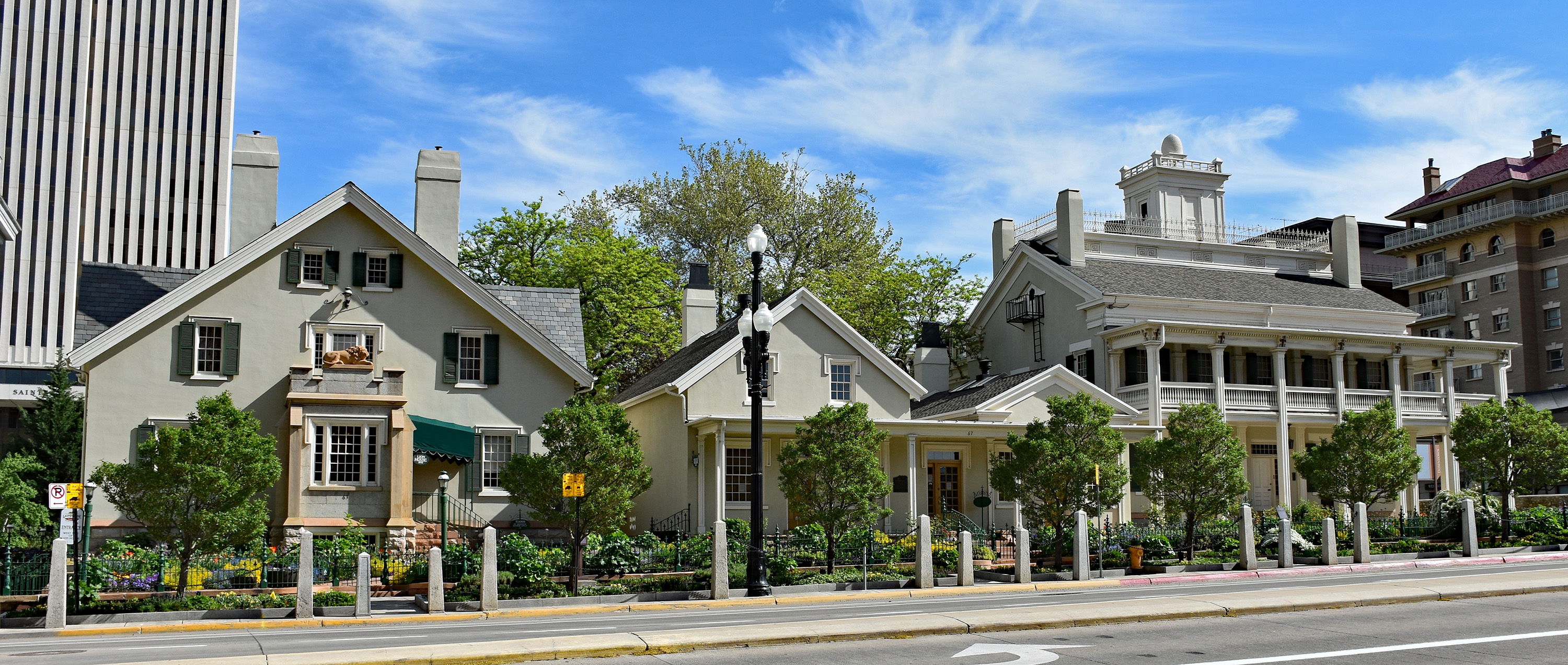

The Brigham Young Complex

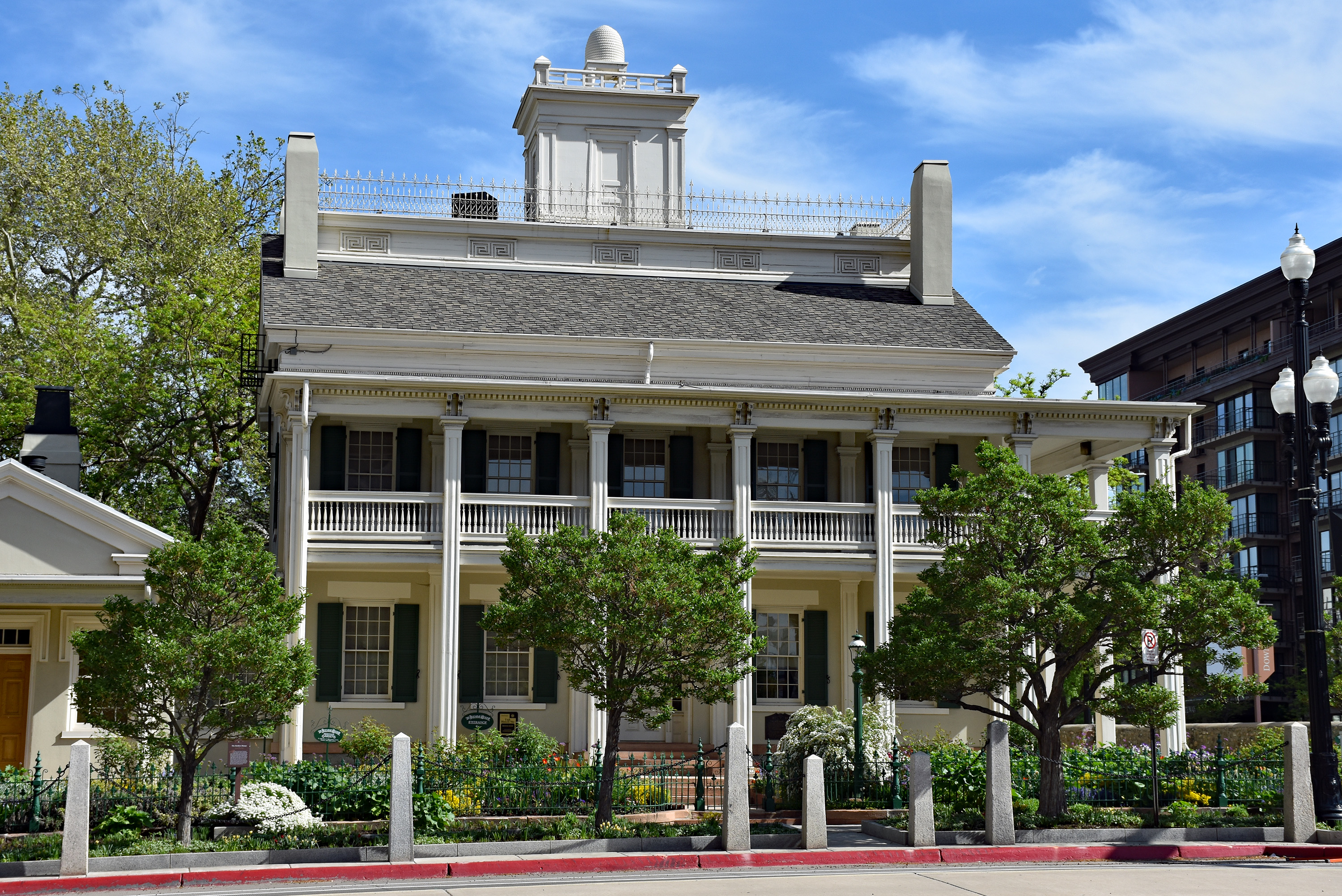

Beehive House

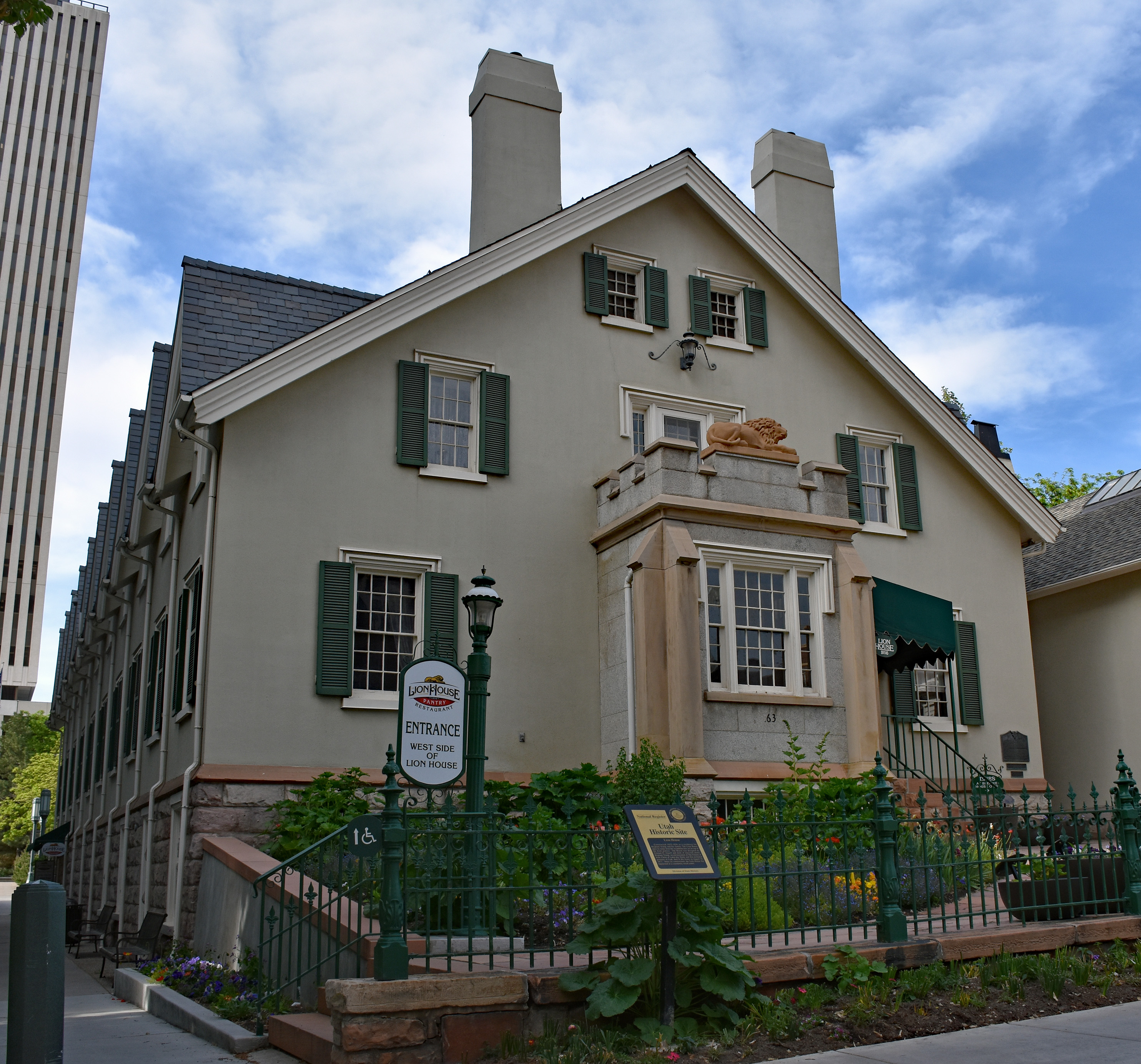

Lion House
Church Administration Building

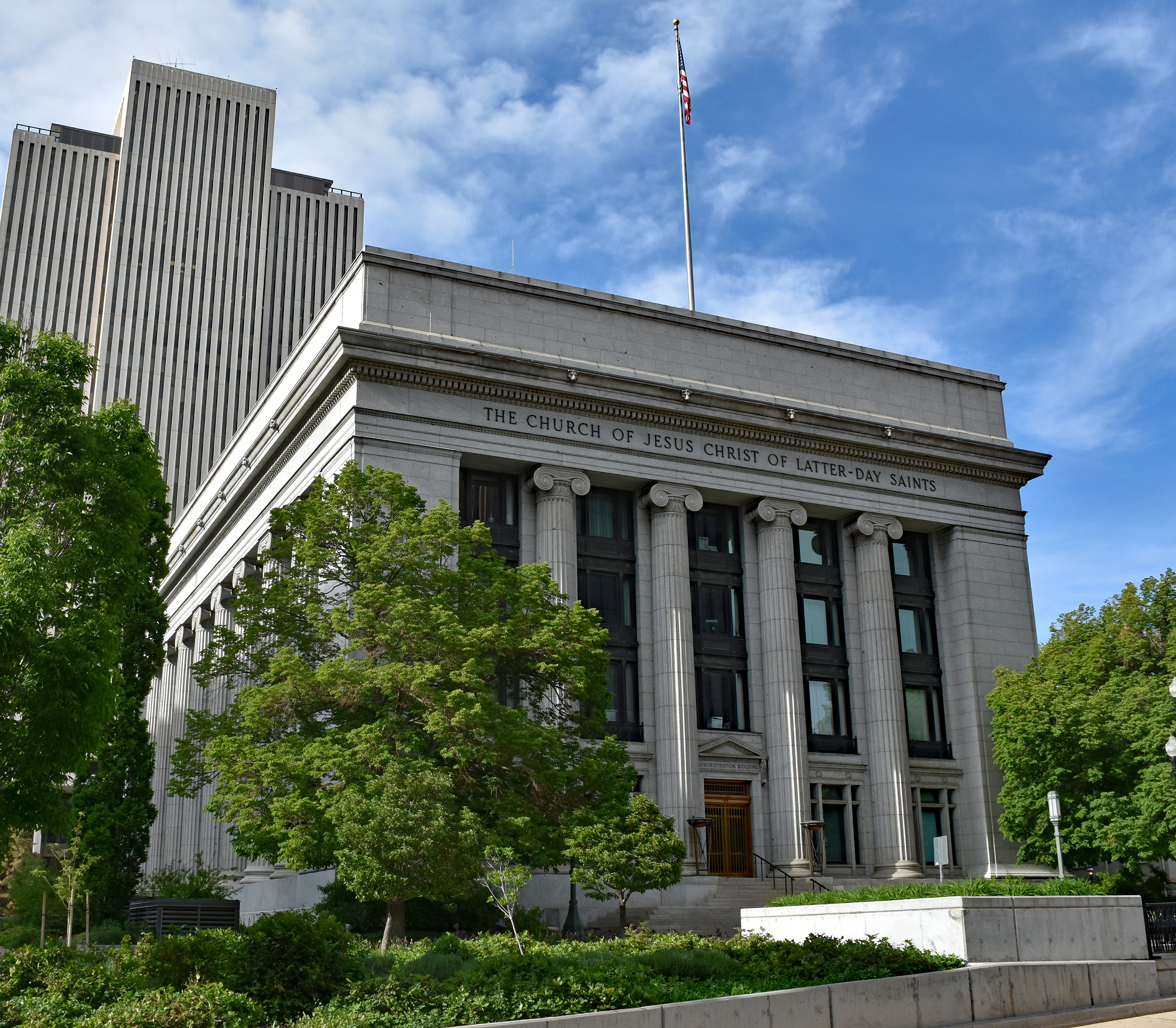

Church History Library

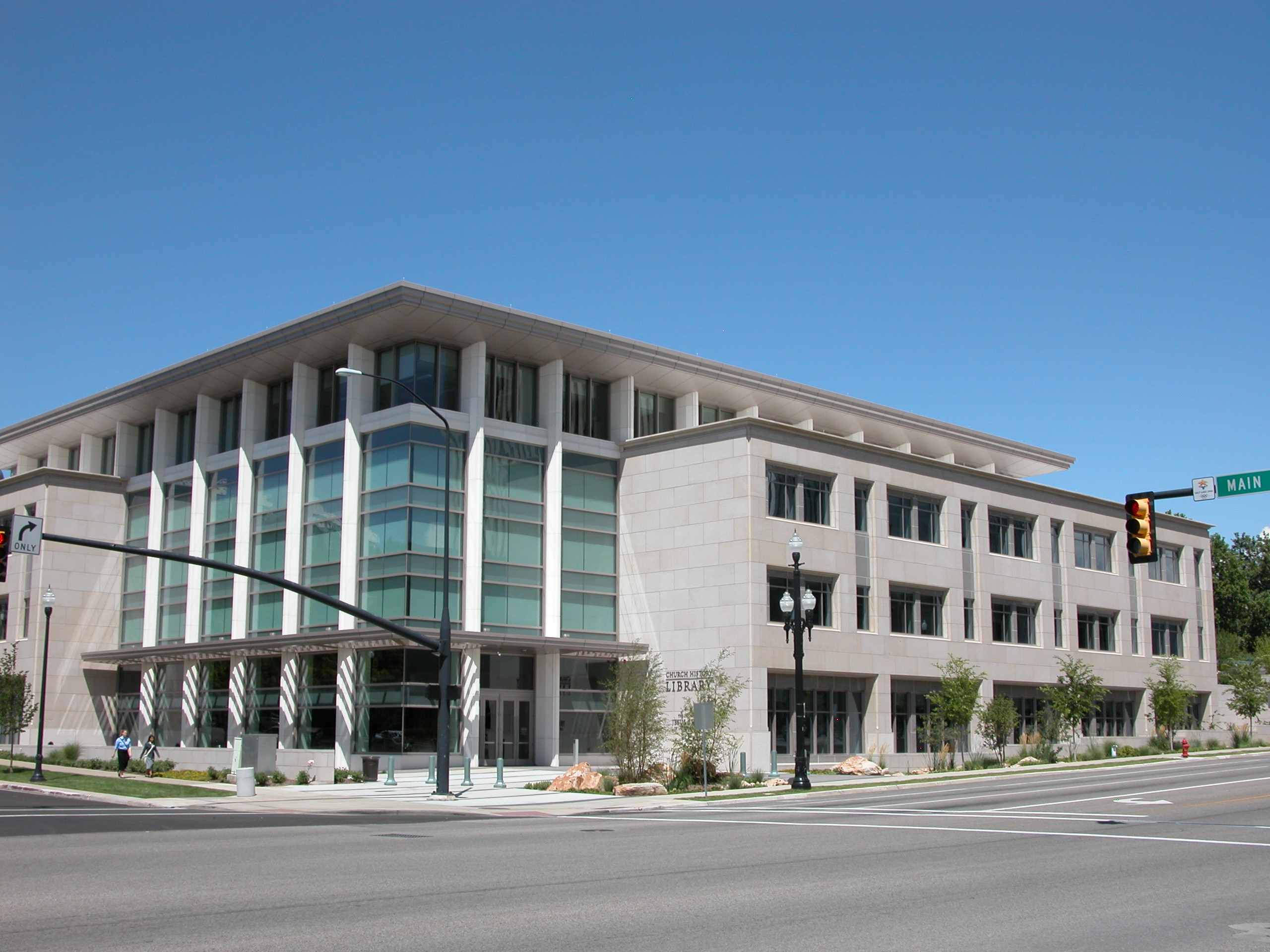

Church History Museum

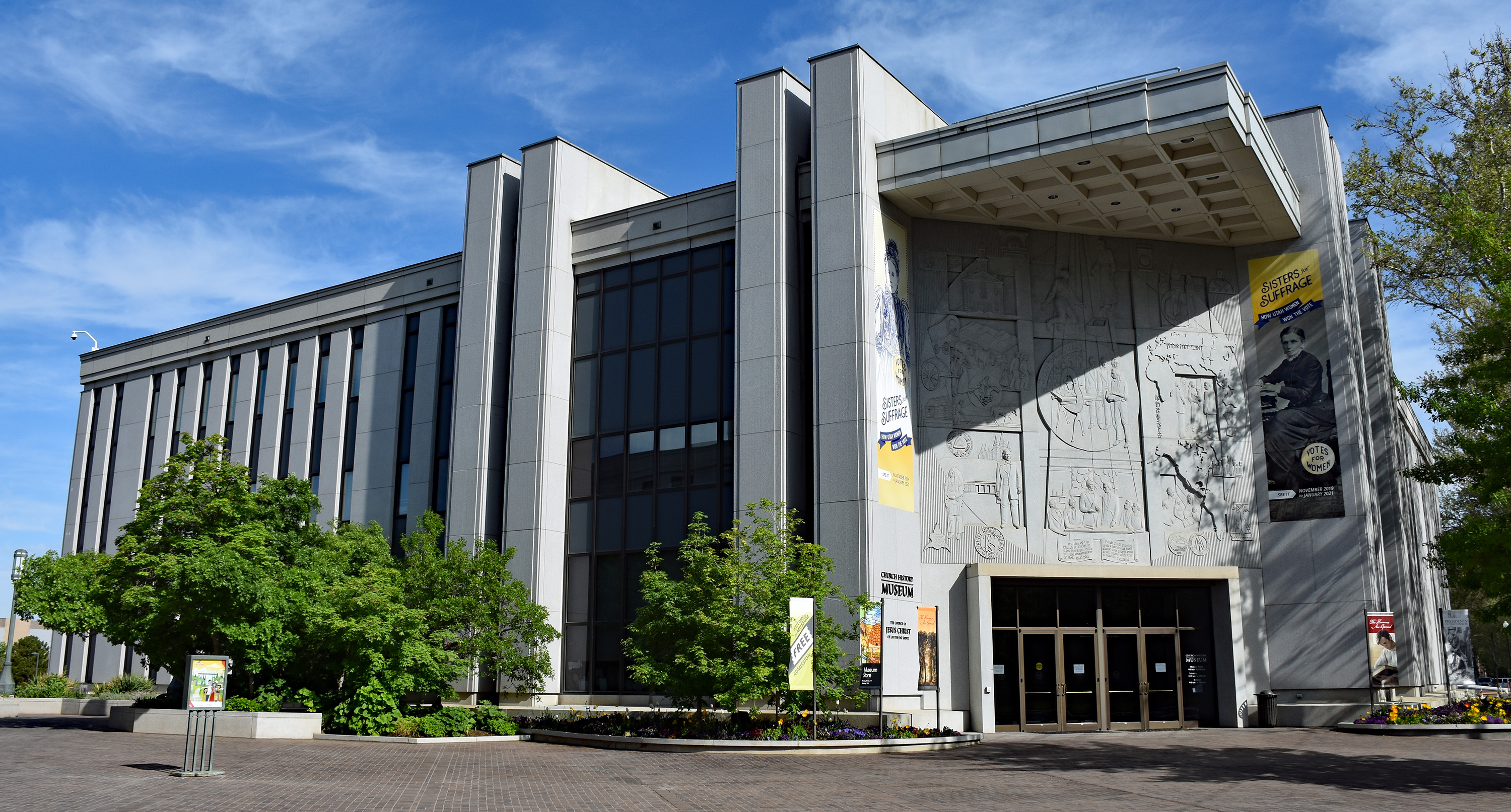

Church Office Building

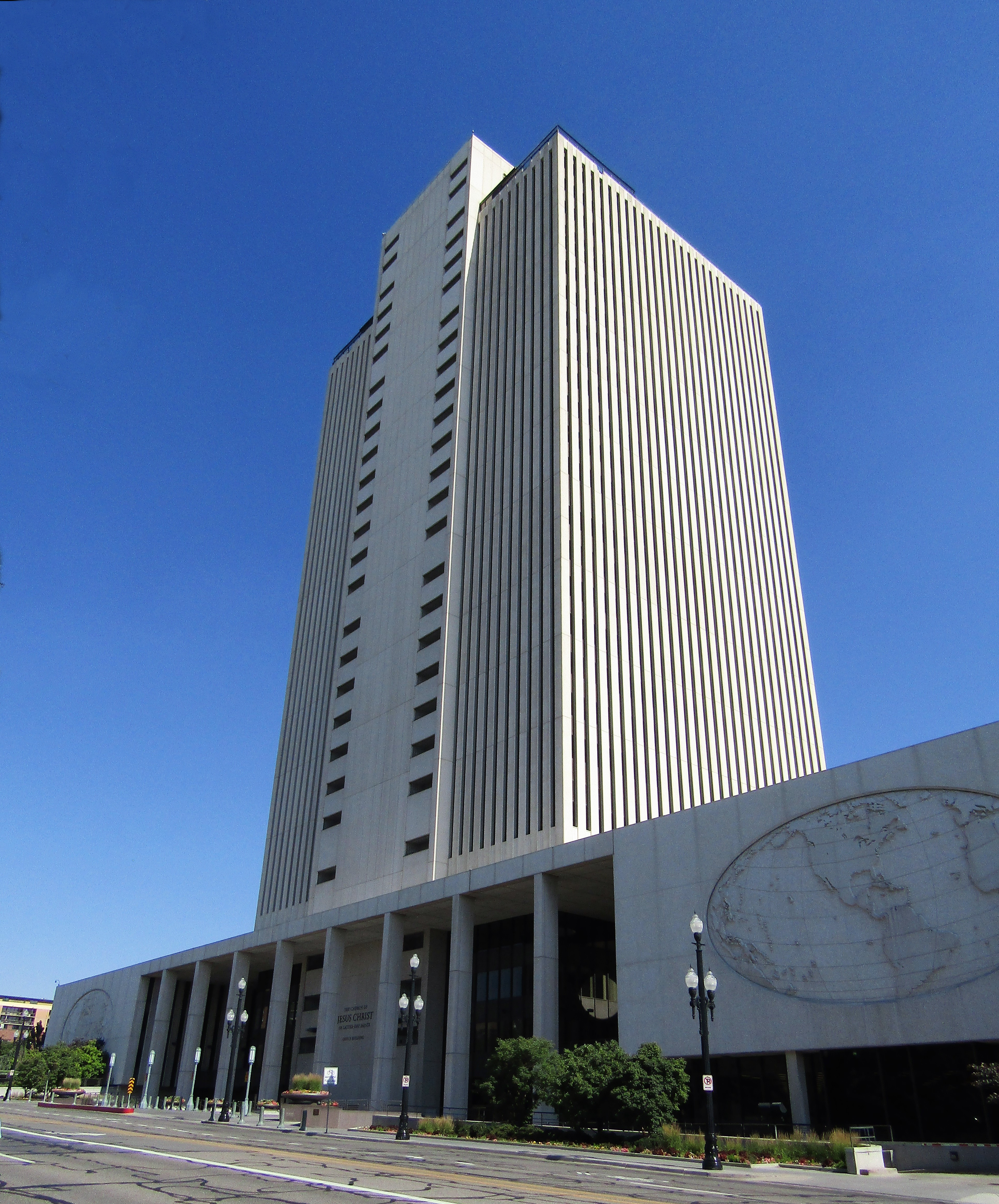

Conference Center
includes:
- Conference Center Organ

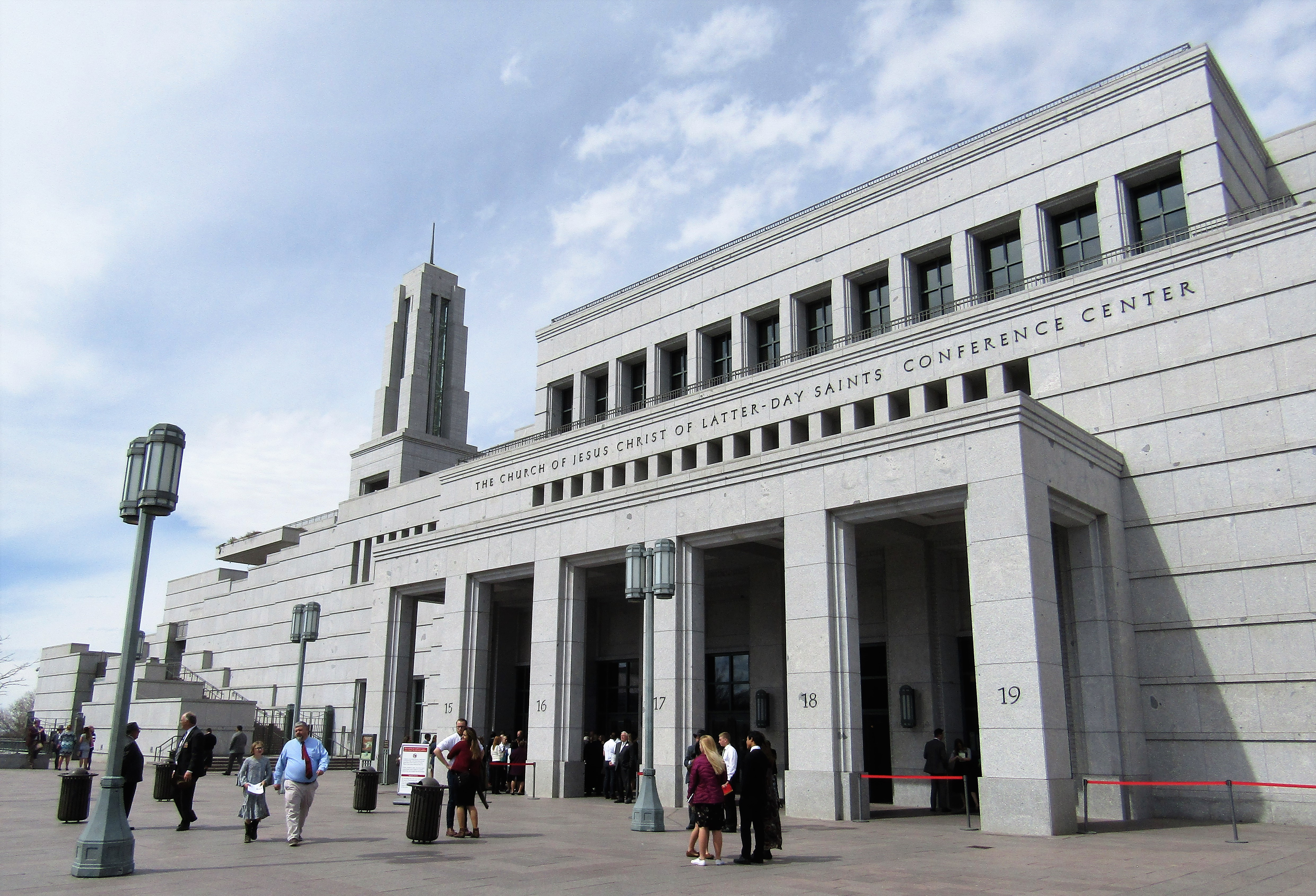

Conference Center

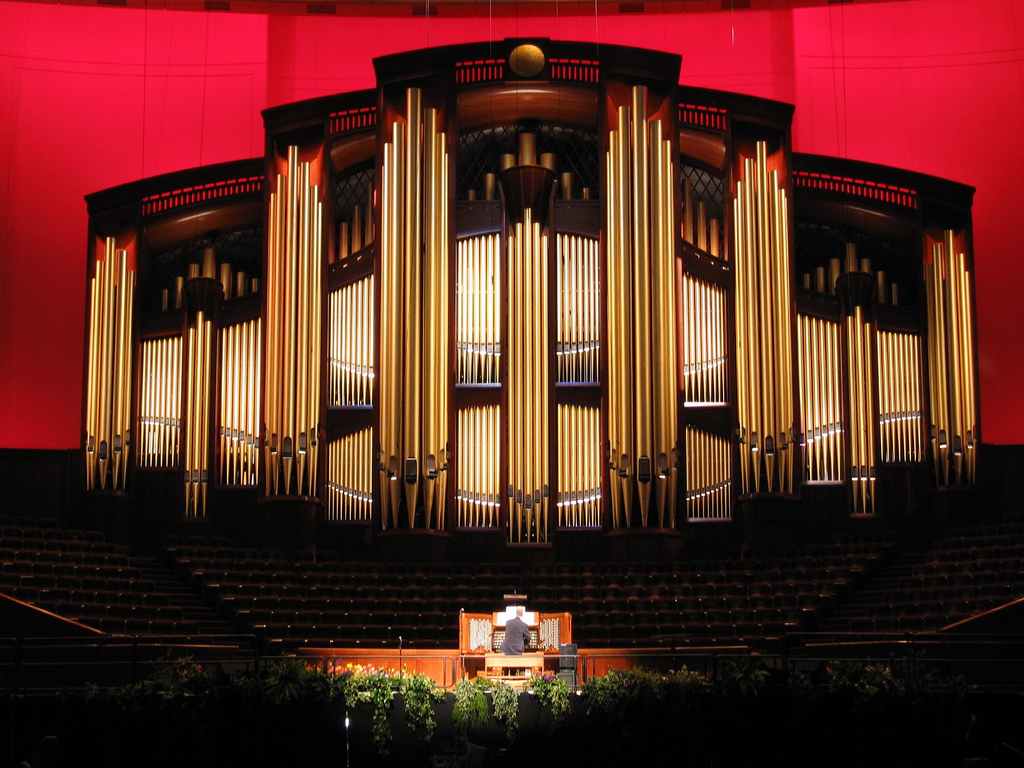

Conference Center Organ
Family History Library

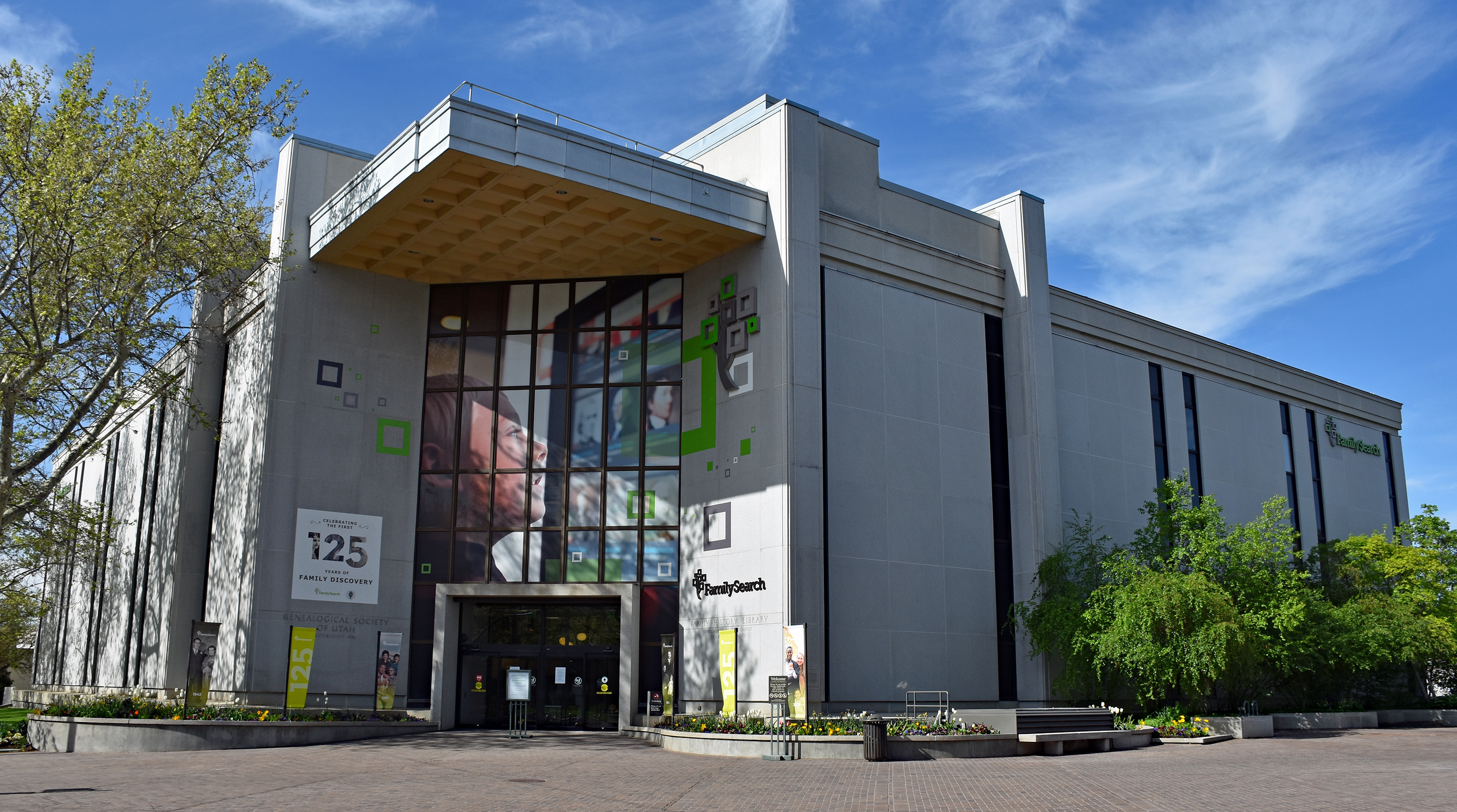

Joseph Smith Memorial Building

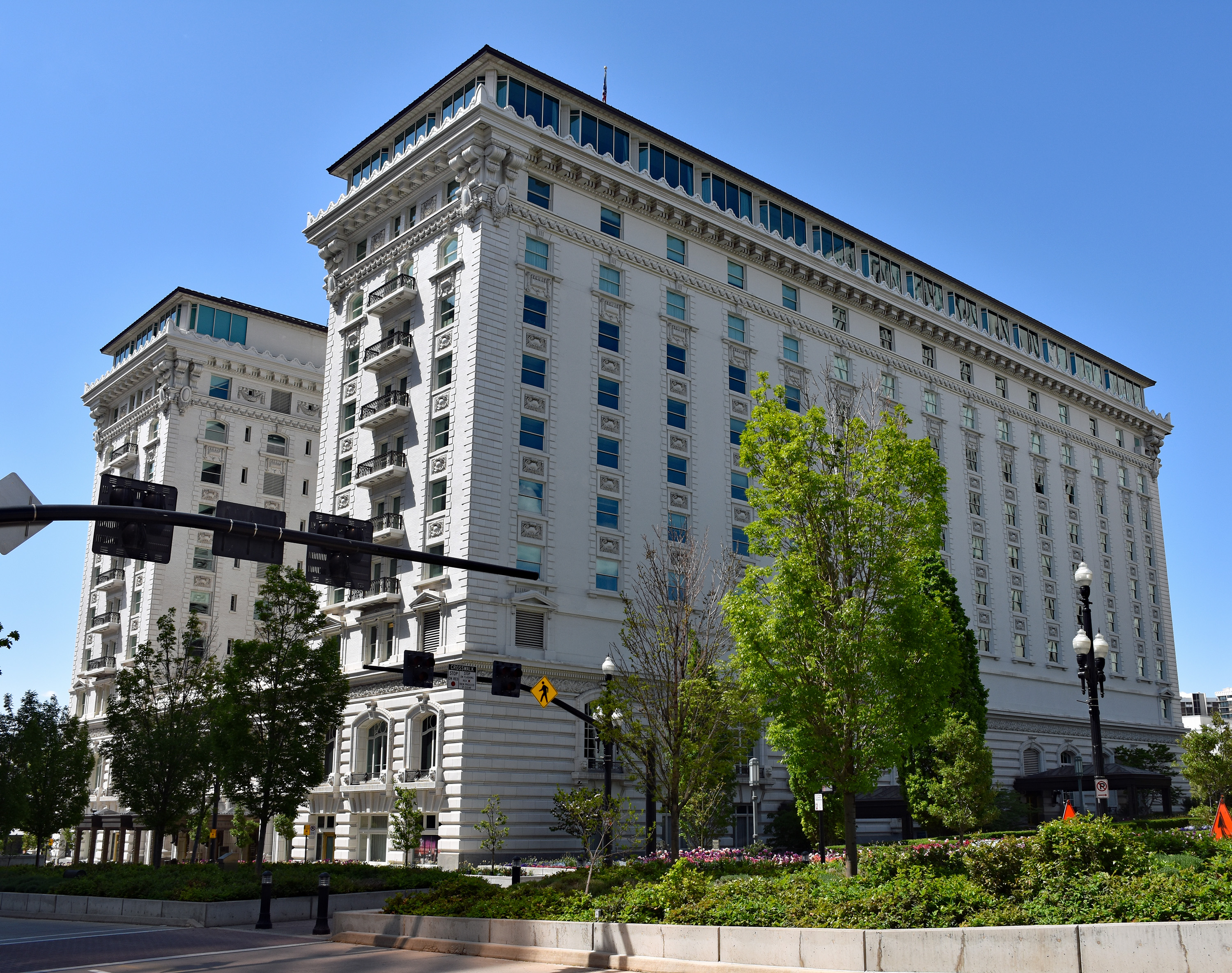

Mormon Pioneer Memorial Monument/Young Family Cemetery

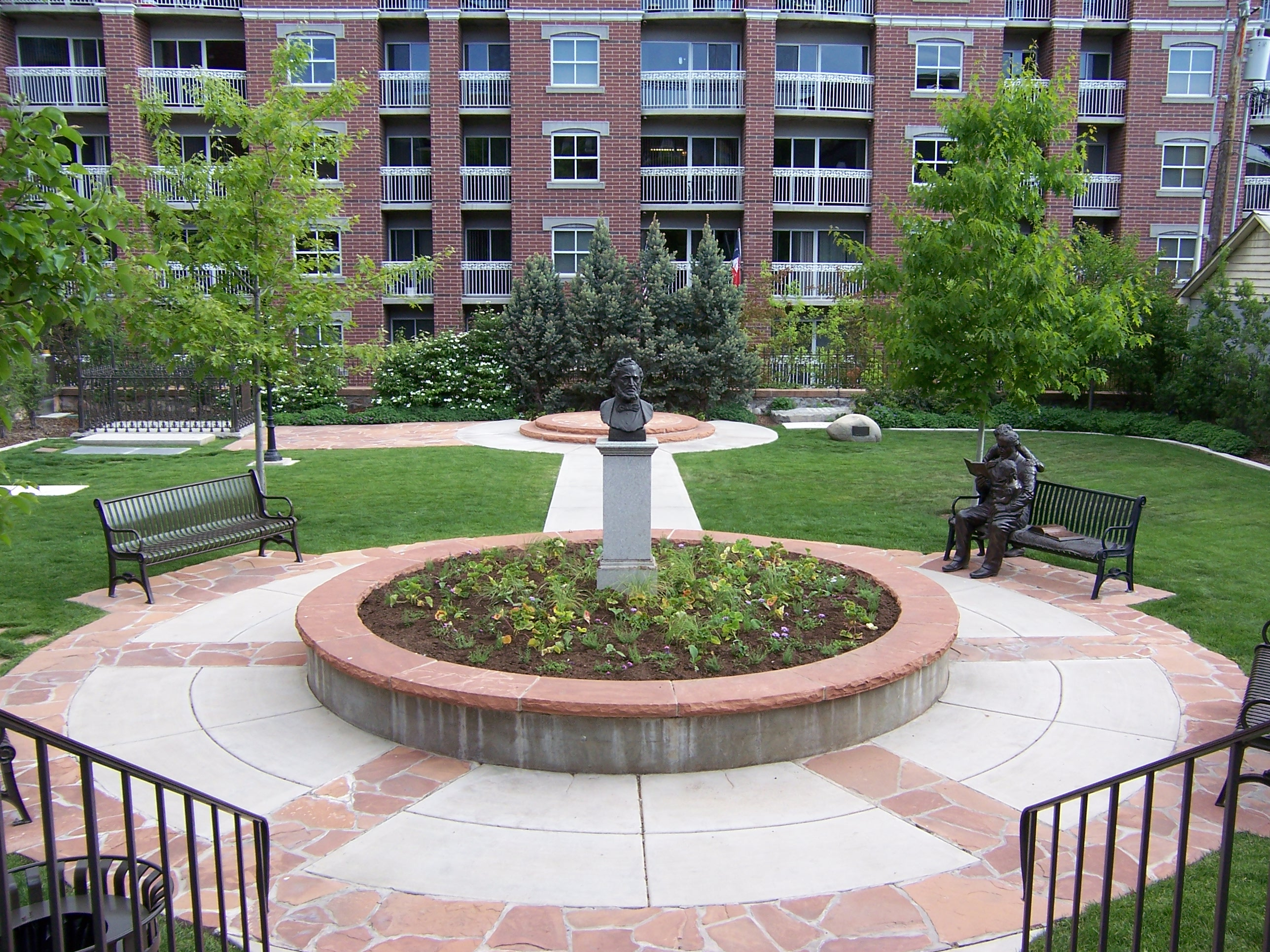

Temple Square
Includes:
- Salt Lake Temple
- Salt Lake Assembly Hall
- Salt Lake Tabernacle
  Includes:
  - Salt Lake Tabernacle organ

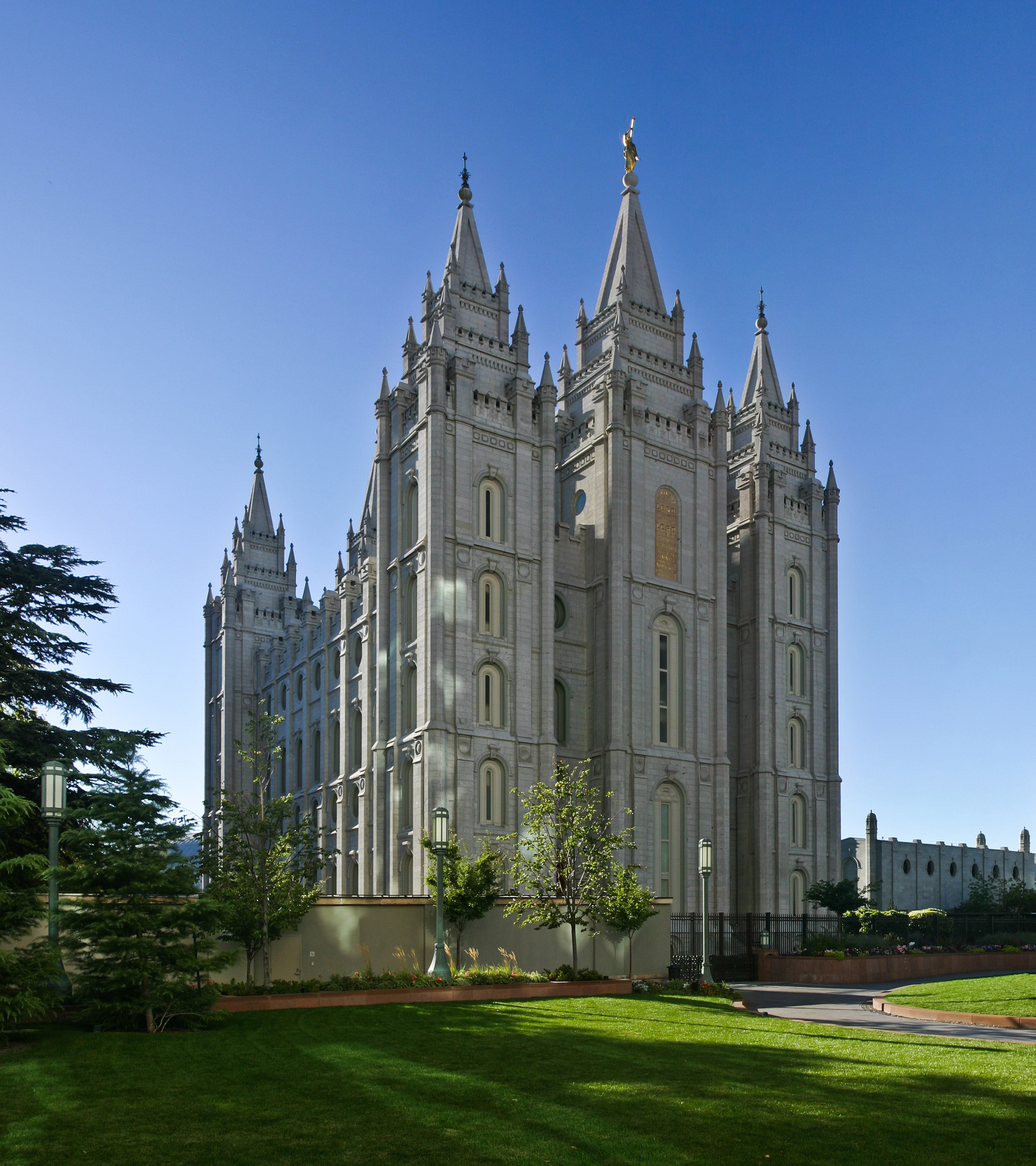

Salt Lake Temple

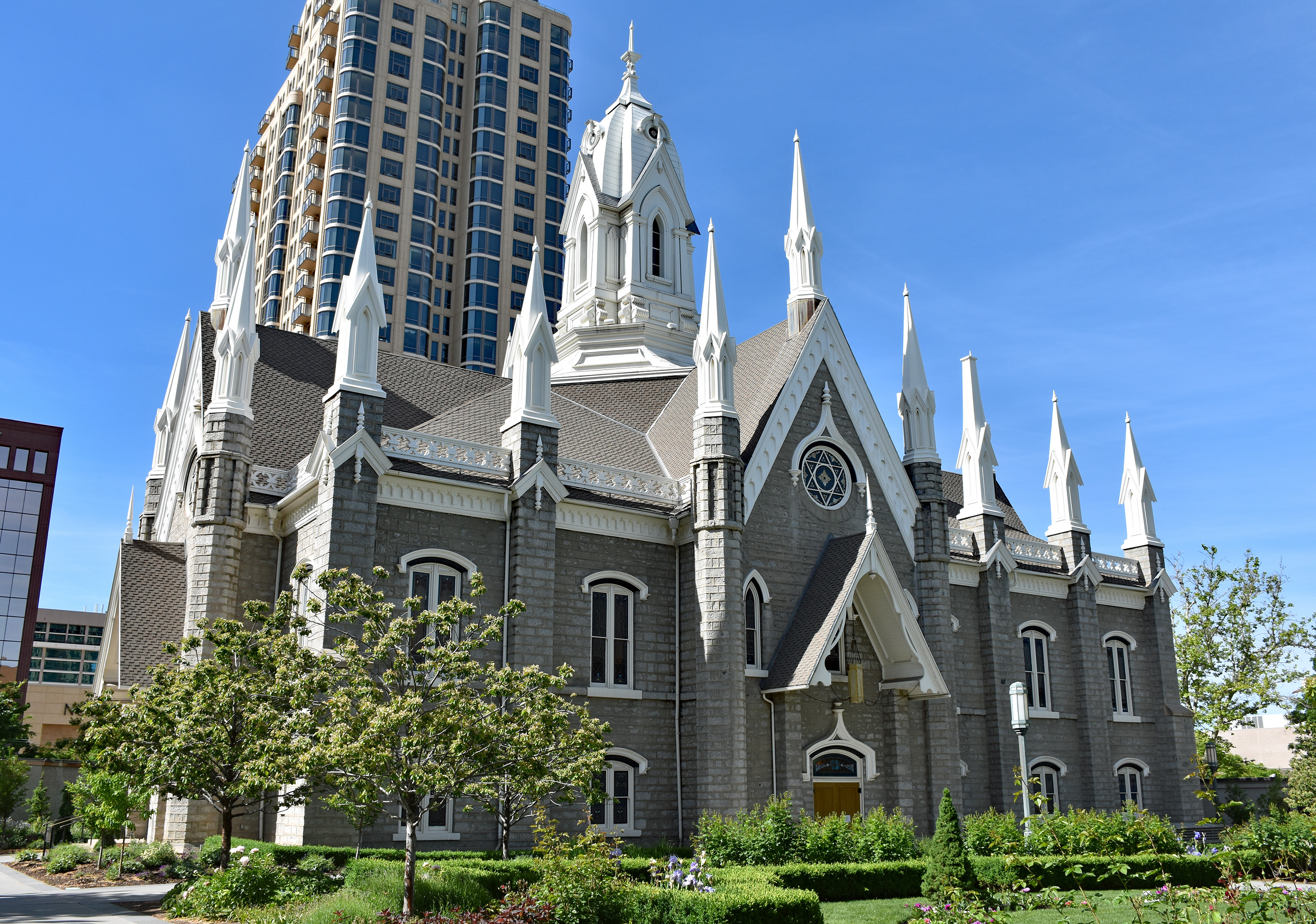

Assembly Hall

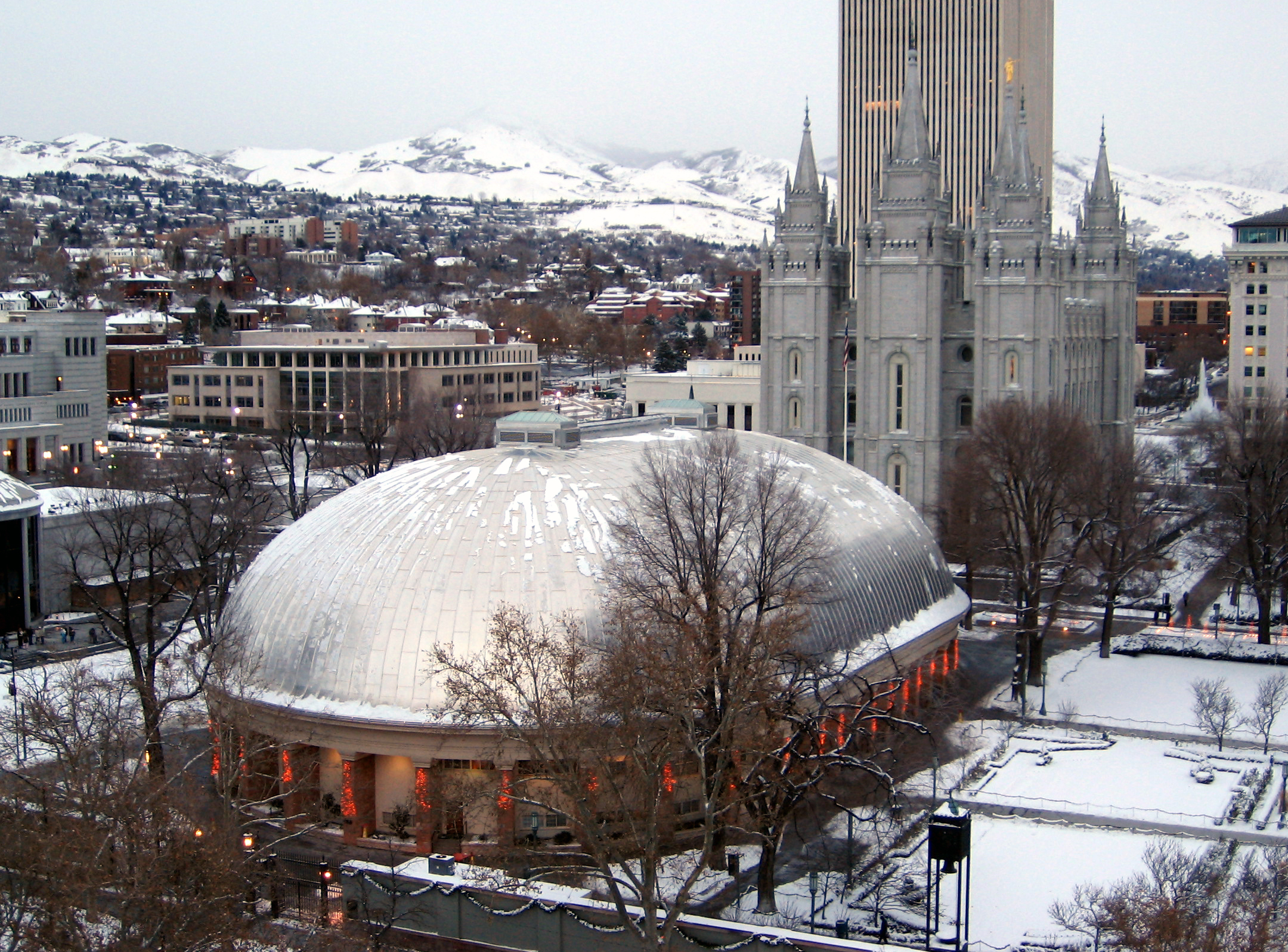

Tabernacle

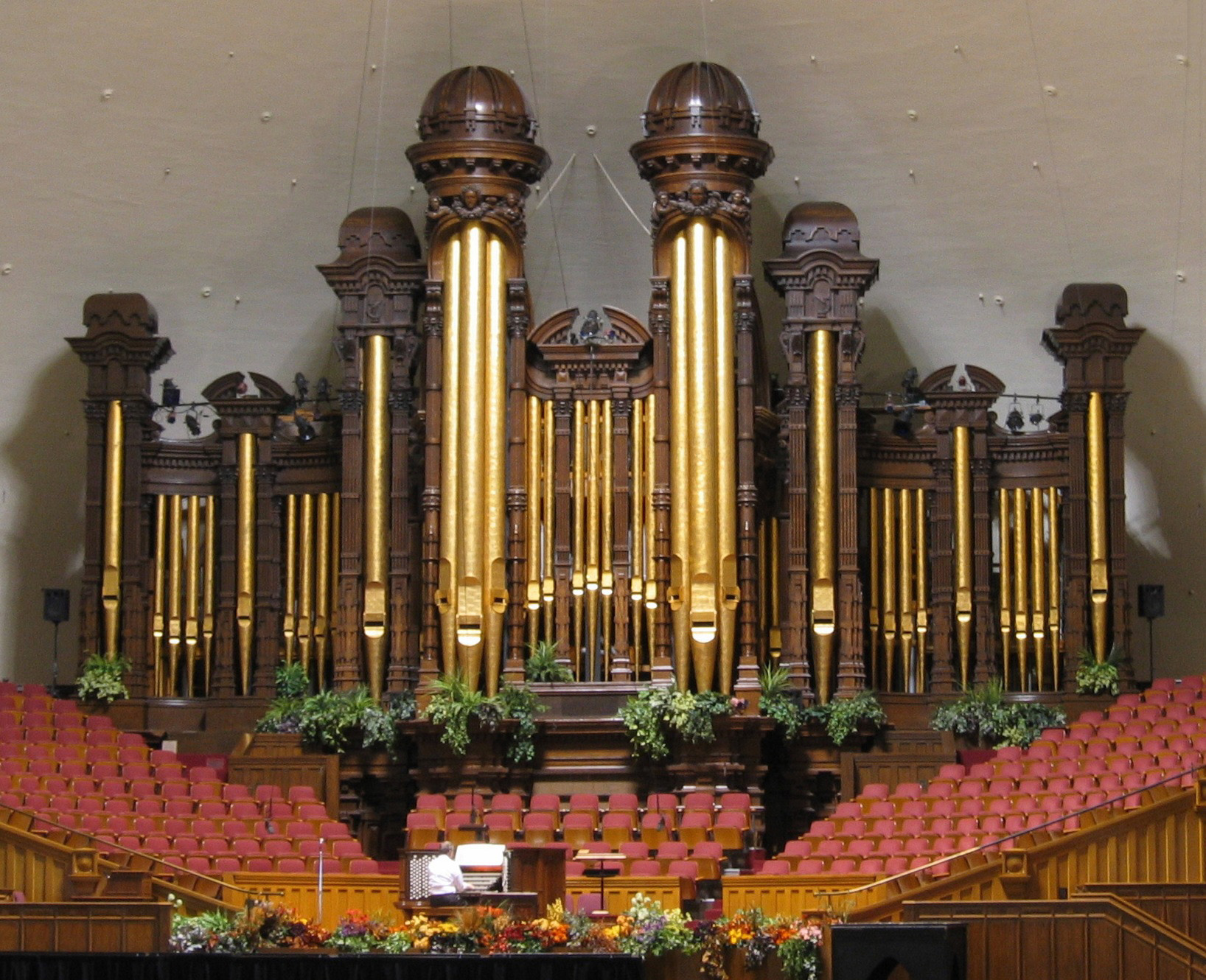

Tabernacle Organ
Relief Society Building

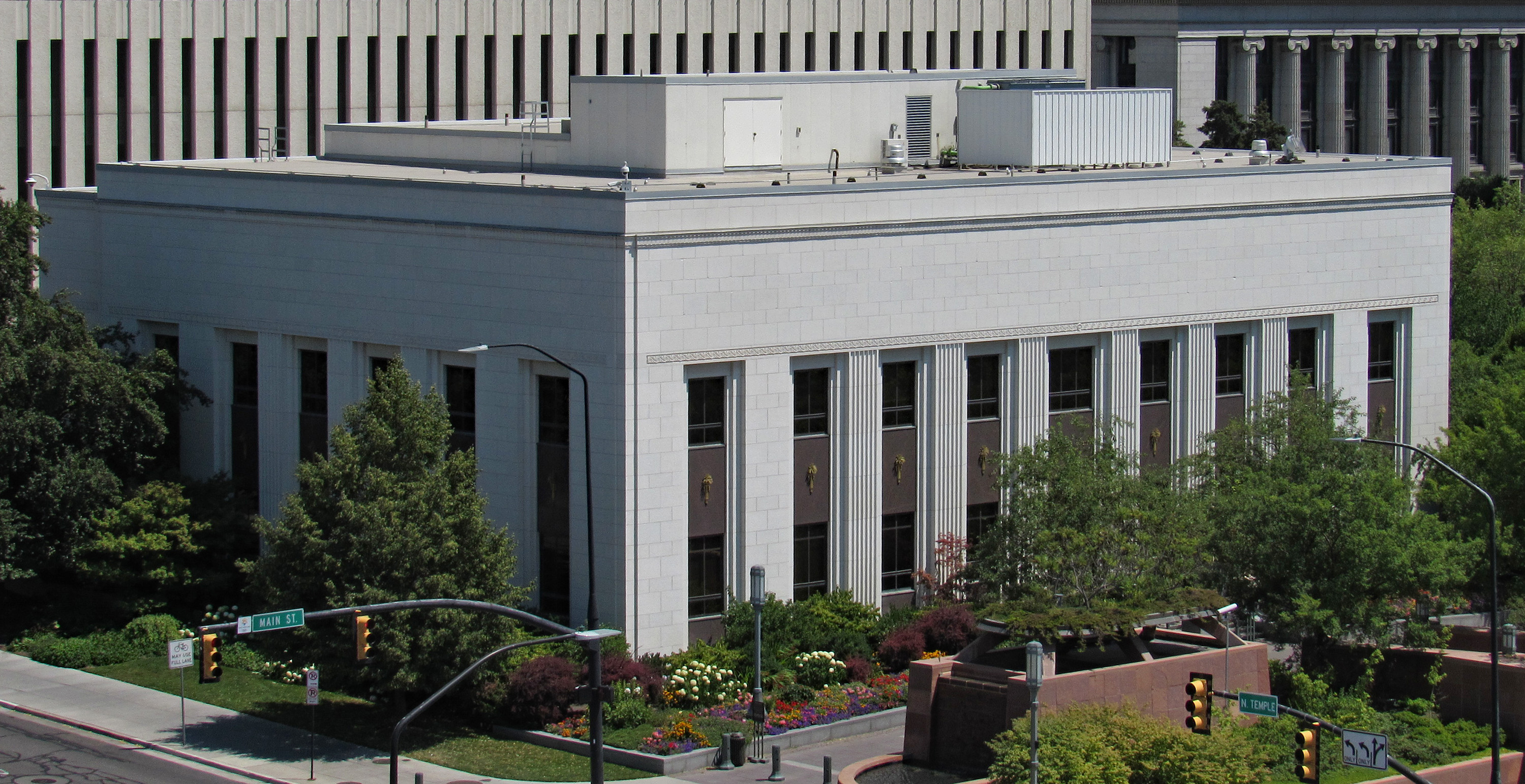

=== Other West ===
Chesterfield, Idaho

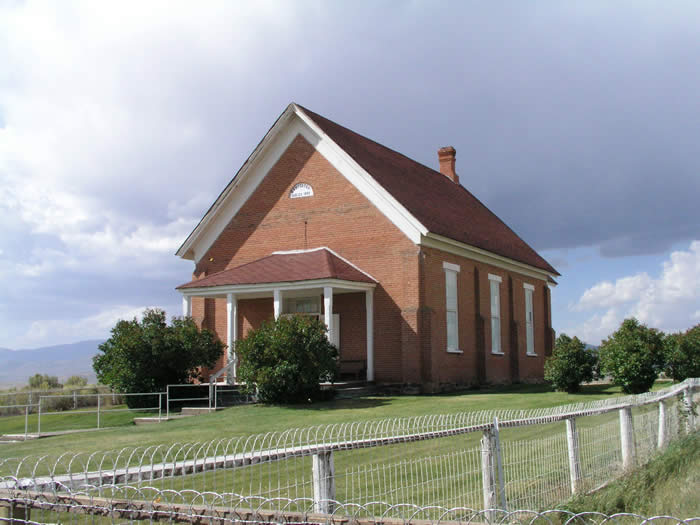

Cove Fort

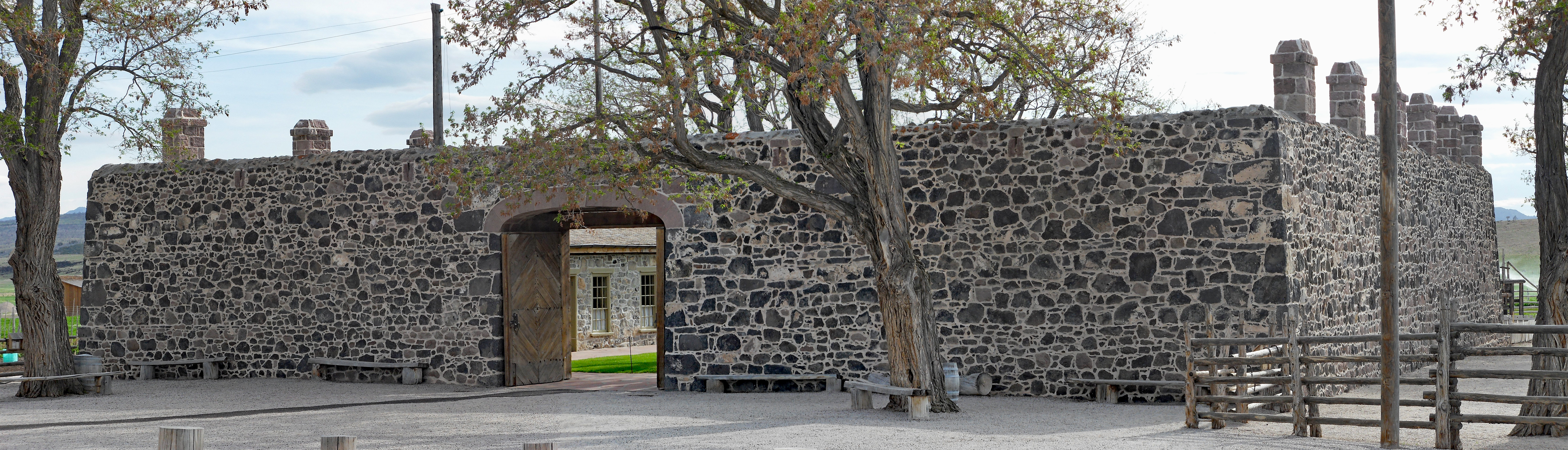

Fort Moore Pioneer Memorial

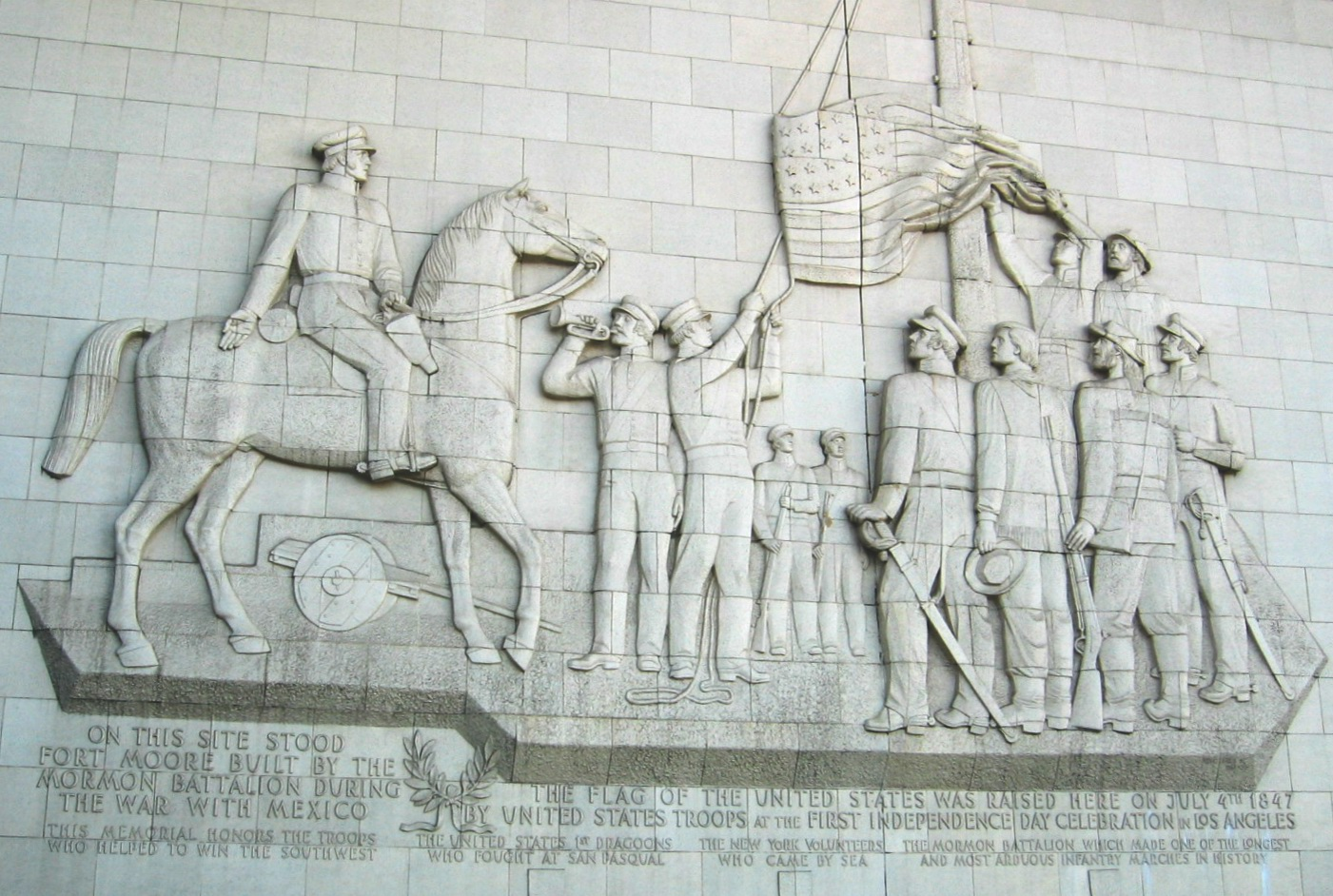

Laie Hawaii Temple Visitors' Center

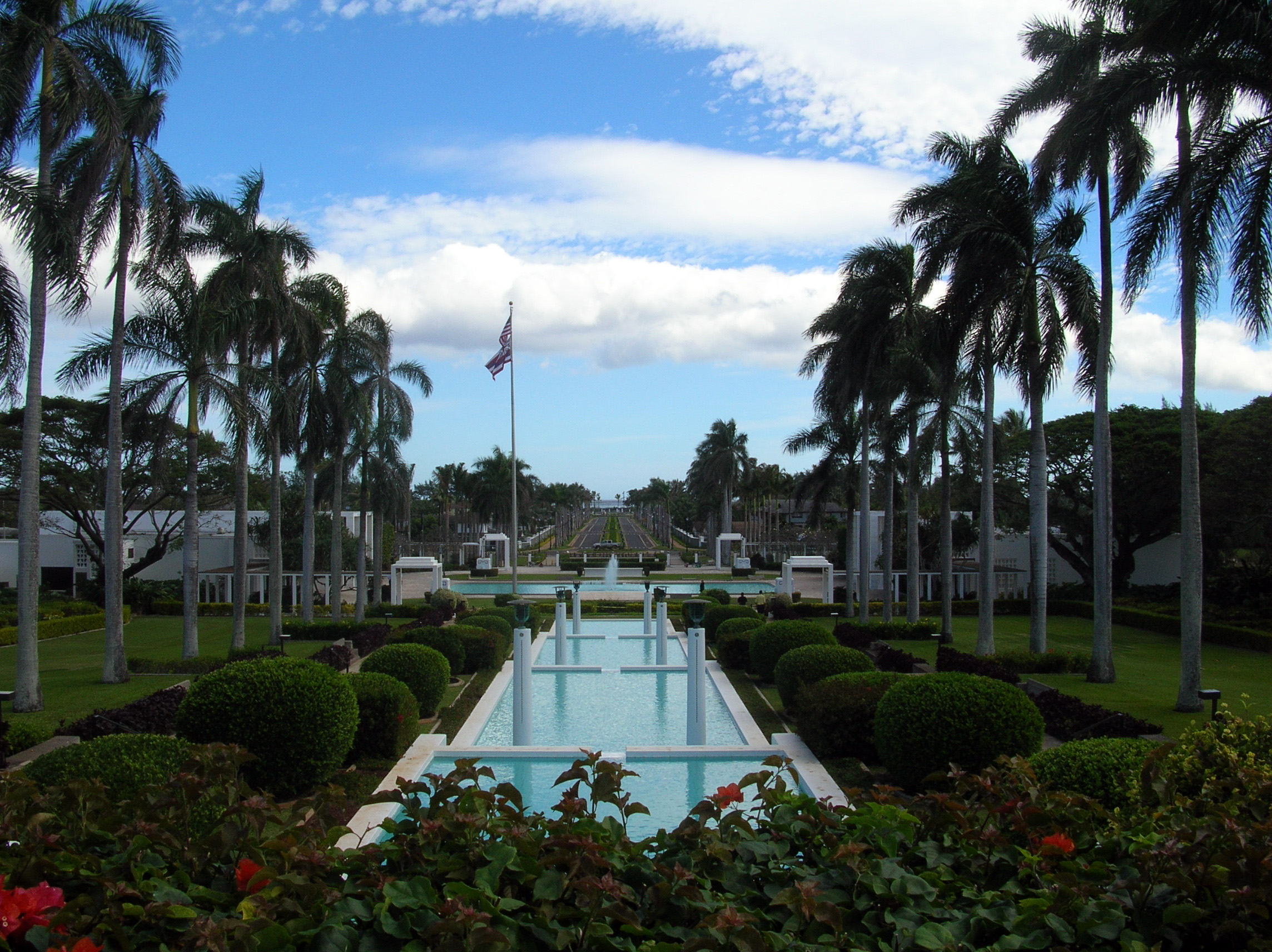

Martin's Cove

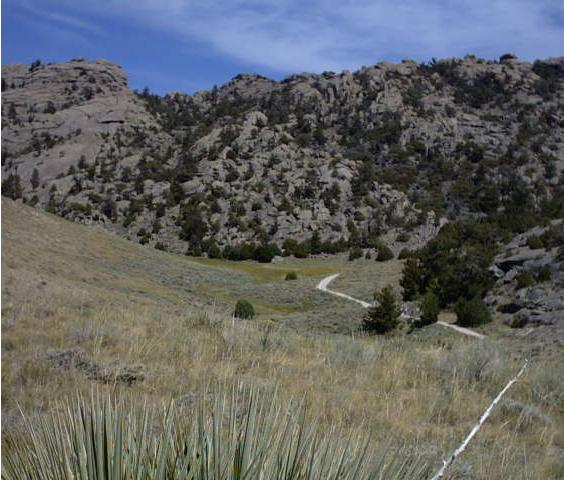

Mormon Battalion Historic Site

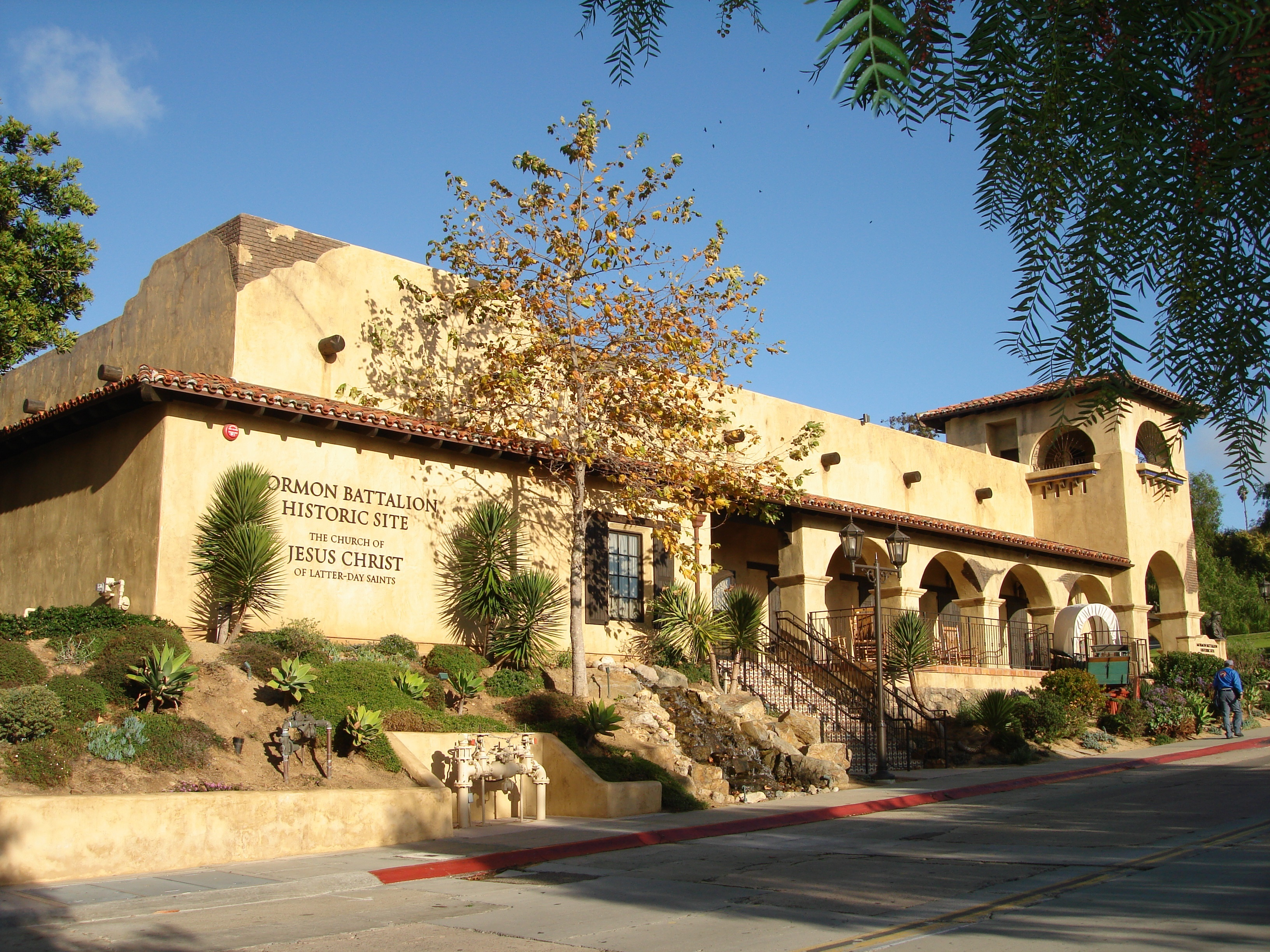

Pipe Spring National Monument

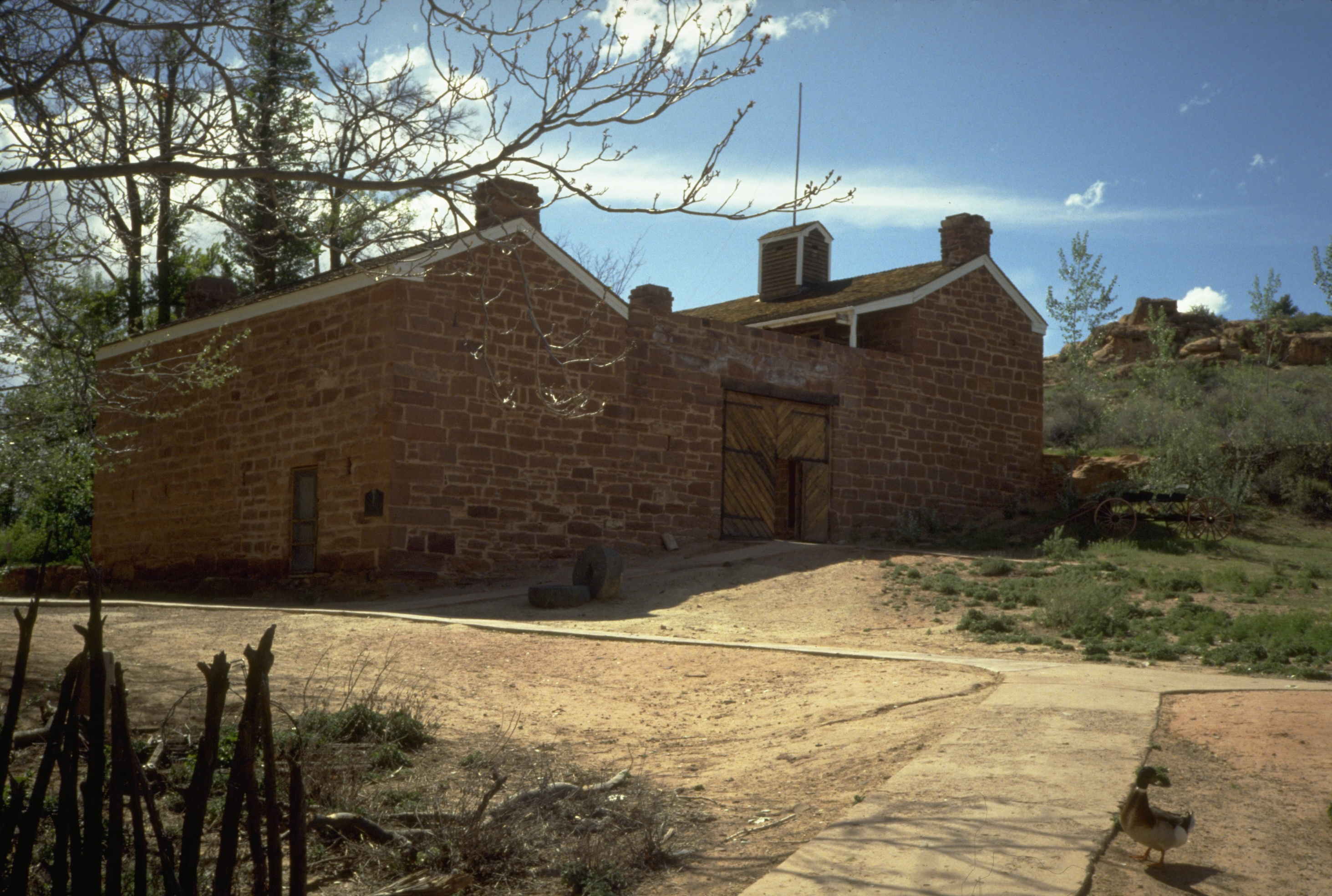

Polynesian Cultural Center

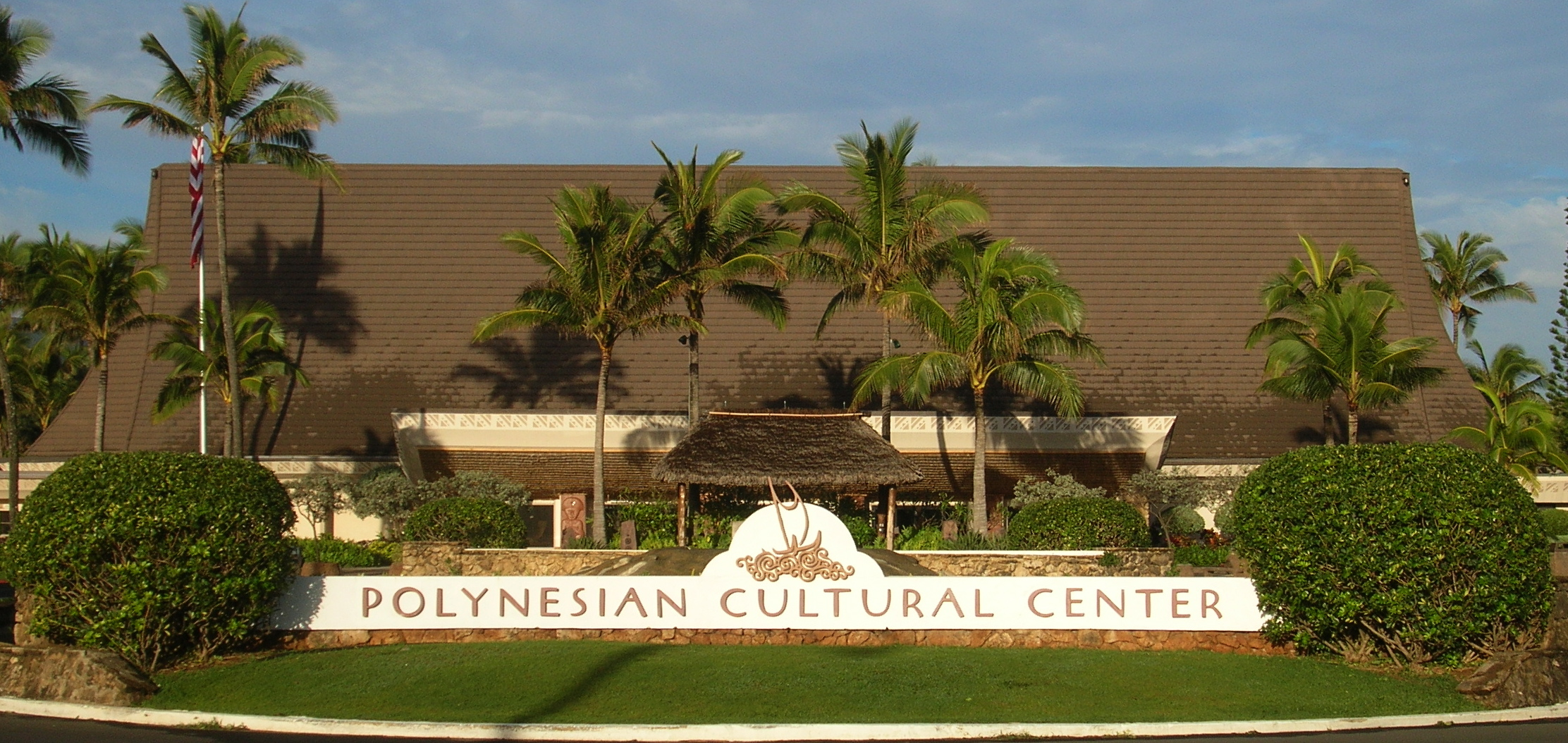

St. George Temple Visitors' Center

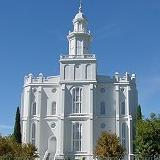

St. George Utah Temple

== Non-U.S. ==
Jerusalem Center

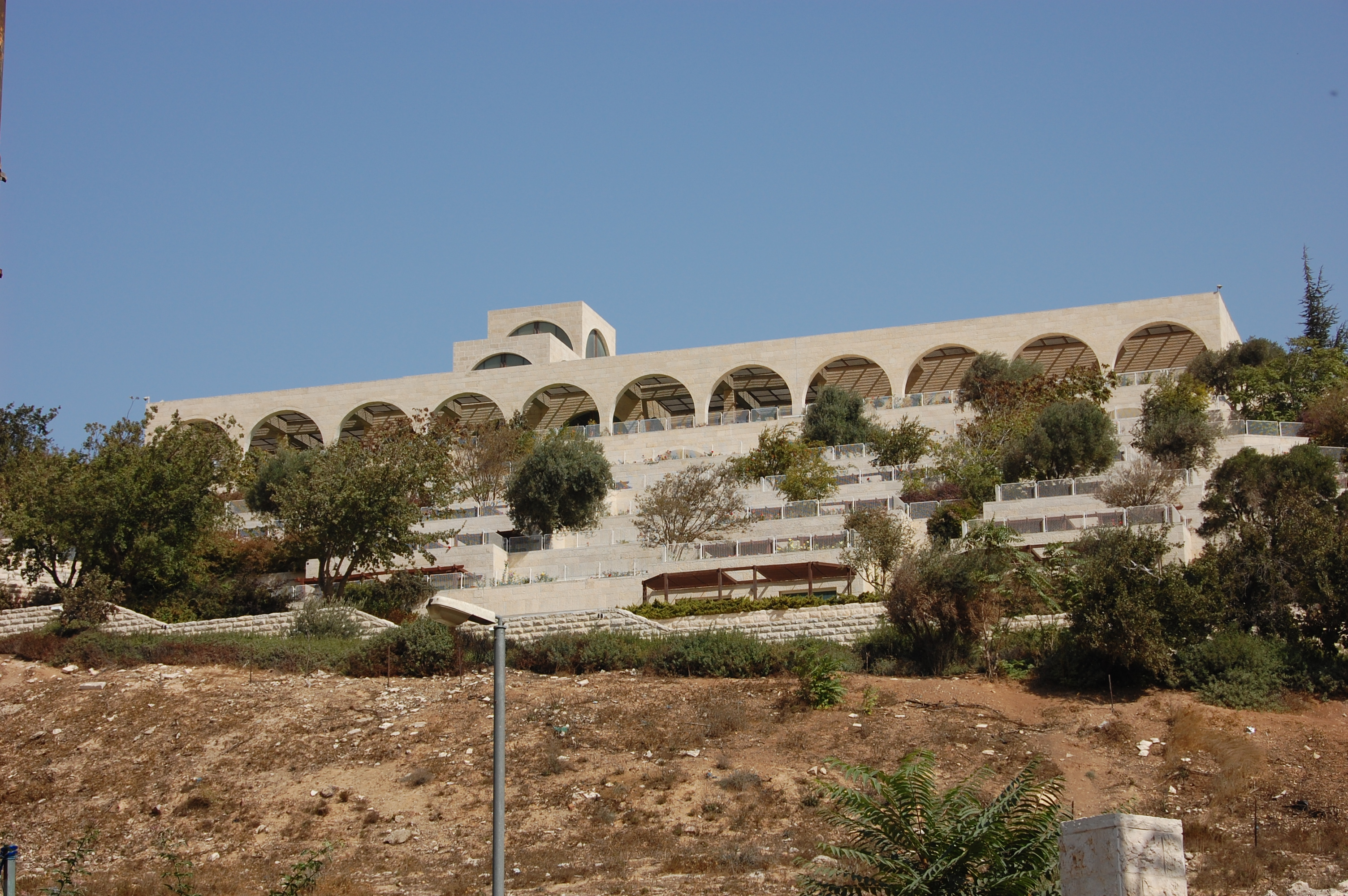

Gadfield Elm Chapel

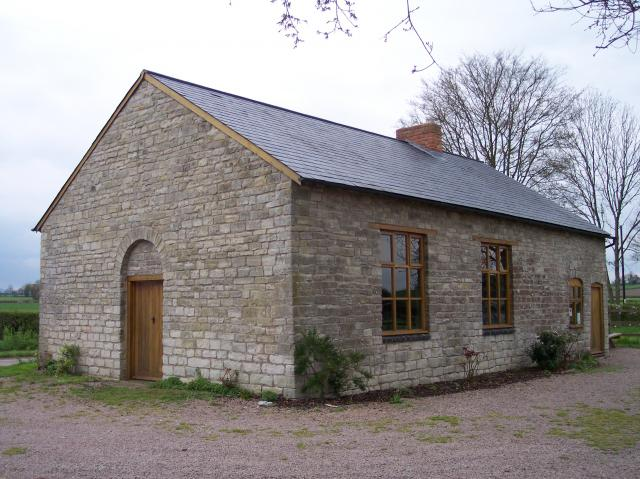

Mexico City Temple Visitors' Center

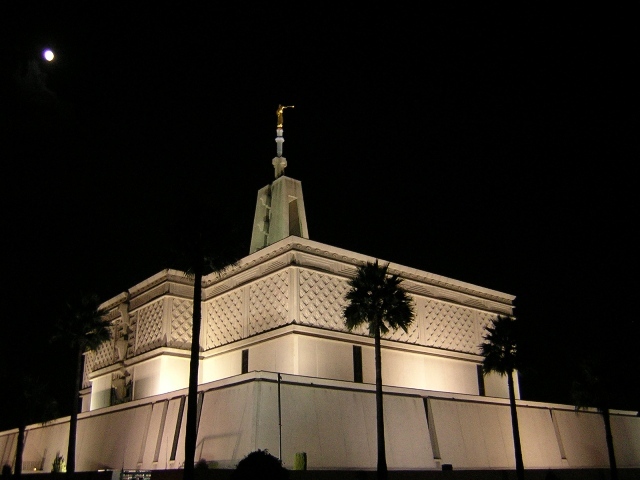

México City México Temple
New Zealand Temple Visitors' Center

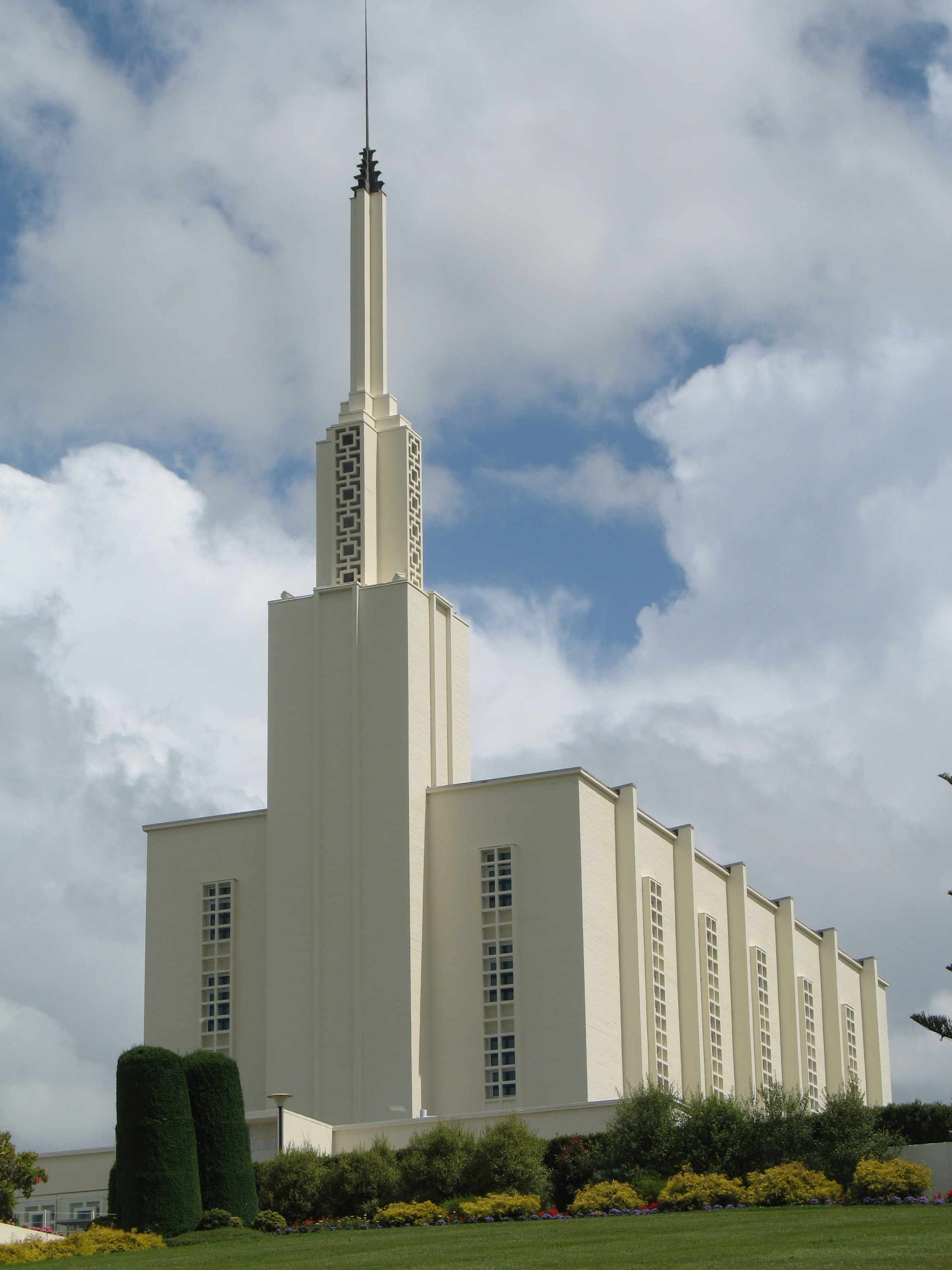

Hamilton New Zealand Temple

== See also ==
- Mormon Corridor
- Mormon Historic Sites Foundation
- Mormon Pioneer National Heritage Area
