= The Church of Jesus Christ of Latter-day Saints in New York =

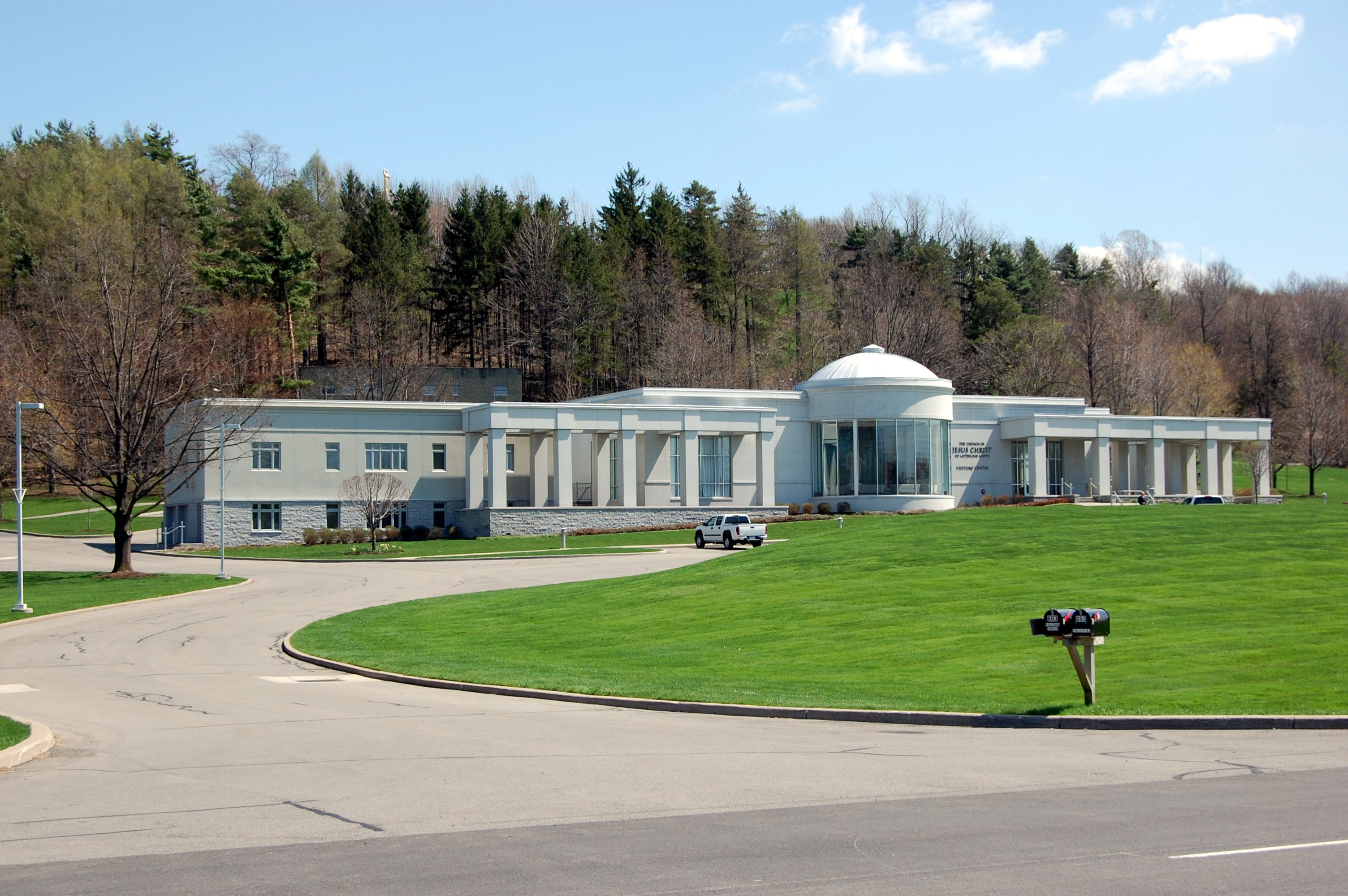
- The Church of Jesus Christ of Latter-day Saints Visitors Center at Hill Cumorah.
- Area: US Northeast
- Members: 92,133 (2025)
- Stakes: 17
- Districts: 1
- Wards: 96
- Branches: 48
- Total Congregations: 144
- Missions: 2
- Temples: 2
- FamilySearch Centers: 65

The Church of Jesus Christ of Latter-day Saints in New York refers to the Church of Jesus Christ of Latter-day Saints (LDS Church) and its members in the state of New York. New York was the boyhood home of Joseph Smith, founder of the Latter Day Saint movement. Much of the early history of the now-worldwide LDS Church is centered in upstate New York. The LDS Church was organized on April 6, 1830, in Fayette, New York under the name of the Church of Christ.

Official church membership as a percentage of general population was 0.41% in 2014. According to the 2014 Pew Forum on Religion & Public Life survey, less than 1% of New Yorkers self-identify themselves most closely with the LDS Church. The LDS Church is the 13th largest denomination in New York.

== History ==
Membership in the New York
Year	Membership
1900	975
1930	1,500
1974	17,072
1989*	38,000
1999	60,516
2009	75,852
2019	83,293
2024	92,133
*Membership was published as a rounded number. Source: Wendall J. Ashton; Jim M. Wall, Deseret News, various years, Church Almanac State Information: New York

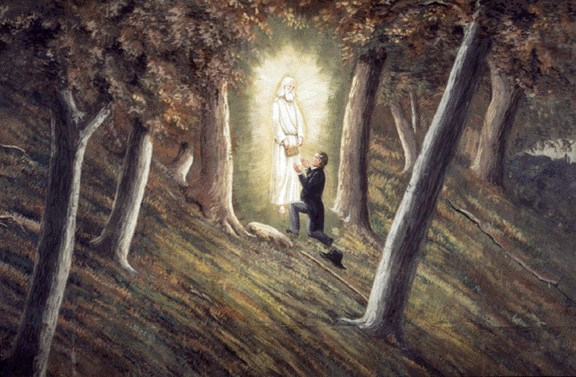
Smith received golden plates from the angel Moroni at the Hill Cumorah.

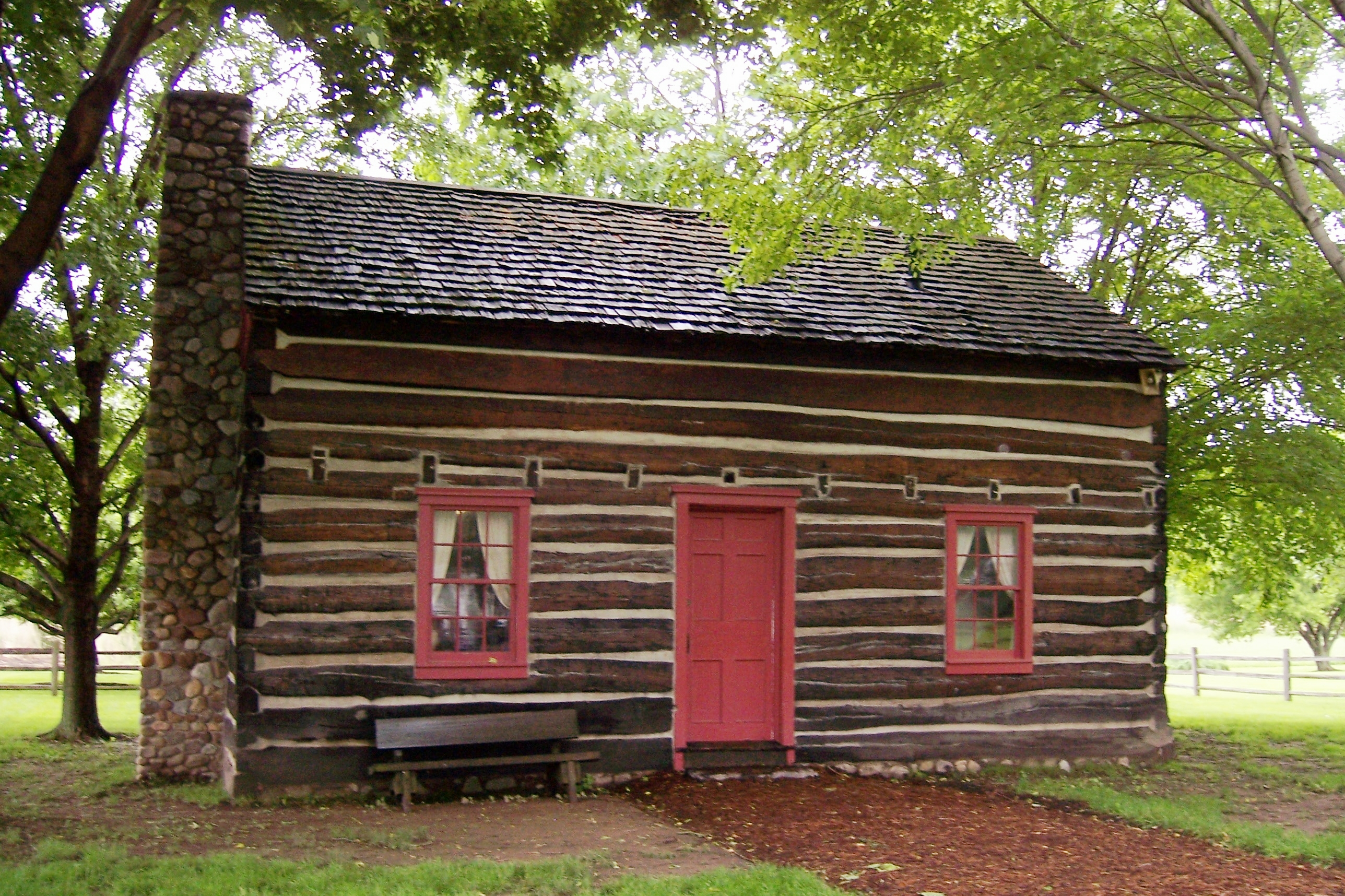
Replica of a cabin at the Peter Whitmer Farm, Fayette (Waterloo), New York where the LDS Church was organized.

The early history of the LDS Church is deeply rooted in the state of New York with pivotal moments taking place in upstate New York and New York City. Joseph Smith stated that while praying in a wooded area near his home in Palmyra in 1820, God and Jesus Christ, in a vision, appeared to him and set in motion the eventual establishment of a new religion.

According to his later accounts, Smith was visited by an angel named Moroni, while praying one night in 1823. Smith said that this angel revealed the location of a buried book made of golden plates that would be translated into the Book of Mormon.

The completed work was published in Palmyra on March 26, 1830, by printer E. B. Grandin. Soon after, on April 6, 1830, Smith and his followers formally organized the Church of Christ, and small branches were established in Palmyra, Fayette, and Colesville, New York. The Book of Mormon brought Smith regional notoriety and opposition from those who remembered the 1826 Chenango County trial.

In July 1840, the first group of new converts from Liverpool, England, arrived on the Britannia ship in the New York harbor.

On April 6, 2000, 170 years after the church was organized, the Palmyra New York Temple was dedicated. The temple overlooks the Sacred Grove and other historic sites. The first temple in New York City, the Manhattan New York Temple, was dedicated on 13 June 2004.

== Stakes ==
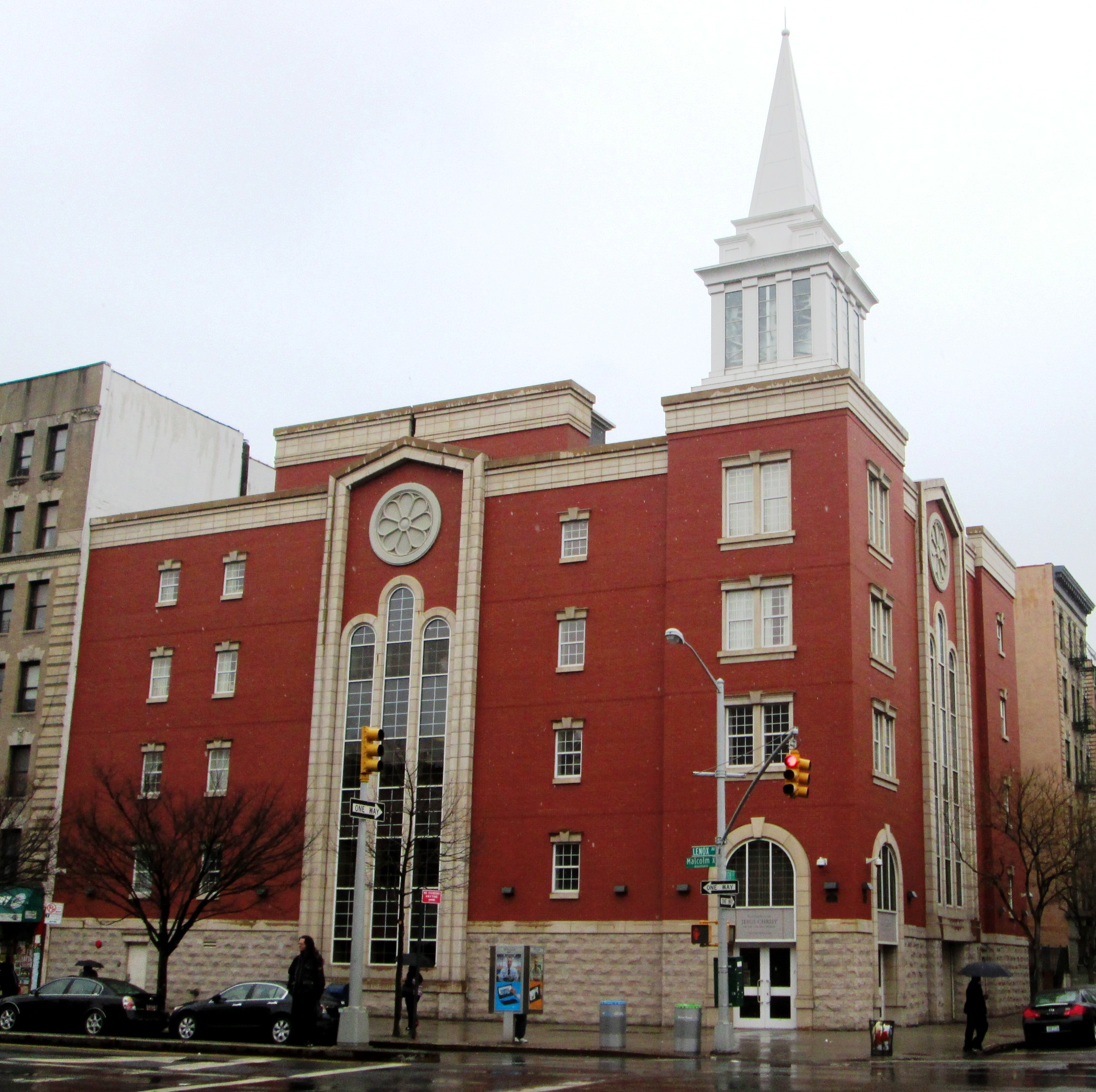
A meetinghouse of the Church of Jesus Christ of Latter-Day Saints in the Harlem neighborhood of Manhattan.

As of July 2026, New York was home to the following stakes:

Stake/District	Organized	Mission	Temple District
Albany New York Stake	8 Jun 1969	New York Syracuse	Hartford Connecticut
Brooklyn New York Stake	22 Nov 1998	New York New York City	Manhattan New York
Buffalo New York Stake	15 Sep 1974	New York Syracuse	Palmyra New York
Jamestown New York Stake	23 Mar 1986	Pennsylvania Pittsburgh	Pittsburgh Pennsylvania
Lynbrook New York Stake	13 Apr 2014	New York New York City	Manhattan New York
Newburgh New York Stake	2 Mar 1997	New Jersey Morristown	Hartford Connecticut
New York New York Stake	9 Dec 1934	New York New York City	Manhattan New York
New York New York YSA Stake	18 Jun 2017	New York New York City	Manhattan New York
Owego New York Stake	25 May 1969	New York Syracuse	Palmyra New York
Palmyra New York Stake	30 Jun 1985	New York Syracuse	Palmyra New York
Plainview New York Stake	20 Aug 1967	New York New York City	Manhattan New York
Potsdam New York District	1 Jan 2000	New York Syracuse	Palmyra New York
Rochester New York Stake	21 Jan 1962	New York Syracuse	Palmyra New York
Soldier Hill New Jersey Stake (Note: Stake located outside of New York with congregation(s) meeting in New York)	12 Apr 1981	New Jersey Morristown	Manhattan New York
Syracuse New York Stake	19 Oct 1975	New York Syracuse	Palmyra New York
Utica New York Stake	14 Jan 1996	New York Syracuse	Palmyra New York
Westchester New York Stake	9 Nov 1997	New York New York City	Manhattan New York
Woodside New York Stake	31 Oct 2004	New York New York City	Manhattan New York

== Missions ==
Mission	Organized
New York New York City Mission*	6 May 1839
New York Syracuse Mission*	26 Jan 1964

- New York New York Mission, originally known as the Eastern States, was organized on May 6, 1839. It was discontinued in 1850, 1858 and 1869, then reopened in 1854, 1865 and 1893 respectively. On June 20, 1974, it ras renamed the New York New York Mission, and then renamed New York New York South Mission on July 1, 1993, when the New York New York North Mission Was Created.
- The Cumorah Mission was renamed the New York Rochester Mission on June 20, 1974.

=== Bermuda Branch ===
The Bermuda Branch is a branch in the New York New York Stake as of July 2026. The LDS Church reported 197 members in the branch as of 2018.

== Temples ==
New York currently has two temples.

Temples in New York

= Operating
= Under construction
= Announced
ButtonBlack.svg|10px|link=Template:LDSmap]] = Temporarily Closed

77. Palmyra New York Temple; Official website; News & images	
Location: Announced: Groundbreaking: Dedicated: Size: Style:	Manchester and Palmyra, New York, United States; February 21, 1999 by Gordon B. Hinckley; May 25, 1999 by Gordon B. Hinckley; April 6, 2000 by Gordon B. Hinckley; 10,900 sq ft (1,010 m^{2}) on a 5-acre (2.0 ha) site Classic modern, single spire - designed by Dave A. Richards; Church A&E Services
119. Manhattan New York Temple (Closed for renovation); Official website; News & images	
Location: Announced: Groundbreaking: Dedicated: Size:	New York City, U.S. August 7, 2002 by Gordon B. Hinckley; September 23, 2002 by Gordon B. Hinckley; June 13, 2004 by Gordon B. Hinckley; 20,630 sq ft (1,917 m^{2}) on a 0.3-acre (0.12 ha) site - designed by Frank Fernandez

=== Harrison New York ===
The Harrison New York Temple, previously known as the White Plains New York Temple, was a planned LDS Church temple that was to be constructed in Harrison, New York. Construction of the temple was to take place on a 24-acre site purchased by the LDS Church at the intersection of Interstate 287 and Hutchinson River Parkway. Reportedly, efforts had been underway until 2004, but construction was never started and eventually suspended. After delays by lawsuits and objections by local officials, this temple was removed from the list on the LDS Church's official temple website soon after the dedication of the Manhattan New York Temple in 2004.

. Harrison New York Temple (Efforts suspended in 2006); News & images	
Location: Announced: Size: Notes:	Harrison, New York, U.S. September 30, 1995 by Gordon B. Hinckley; 28,400 sq ft (2,640 m^{2}) on a 24-acre (9.7 ha) site Originally named the White Plains New York Temple the temple was renamed as the Harrison New York Temple. Along with the Boston Massachusetts Temple, it was to be built instead of the Hartford Connecticut Temple announced in October 1992. Reportedly, efforts were still underway in 2004, though delayed by lawsuits and objections by local officials. According to a Deseret News article about the Manhattan Temple. However, this temple was removed from the list on the Church's official temple website soon after the dedication of the Manhattan New York Temple.

== See also ==
- The Church of Jesus Christ of Latter-day Saints membership statistics (United States)
