= Palmyra New York Temple =

Temple of LDS church

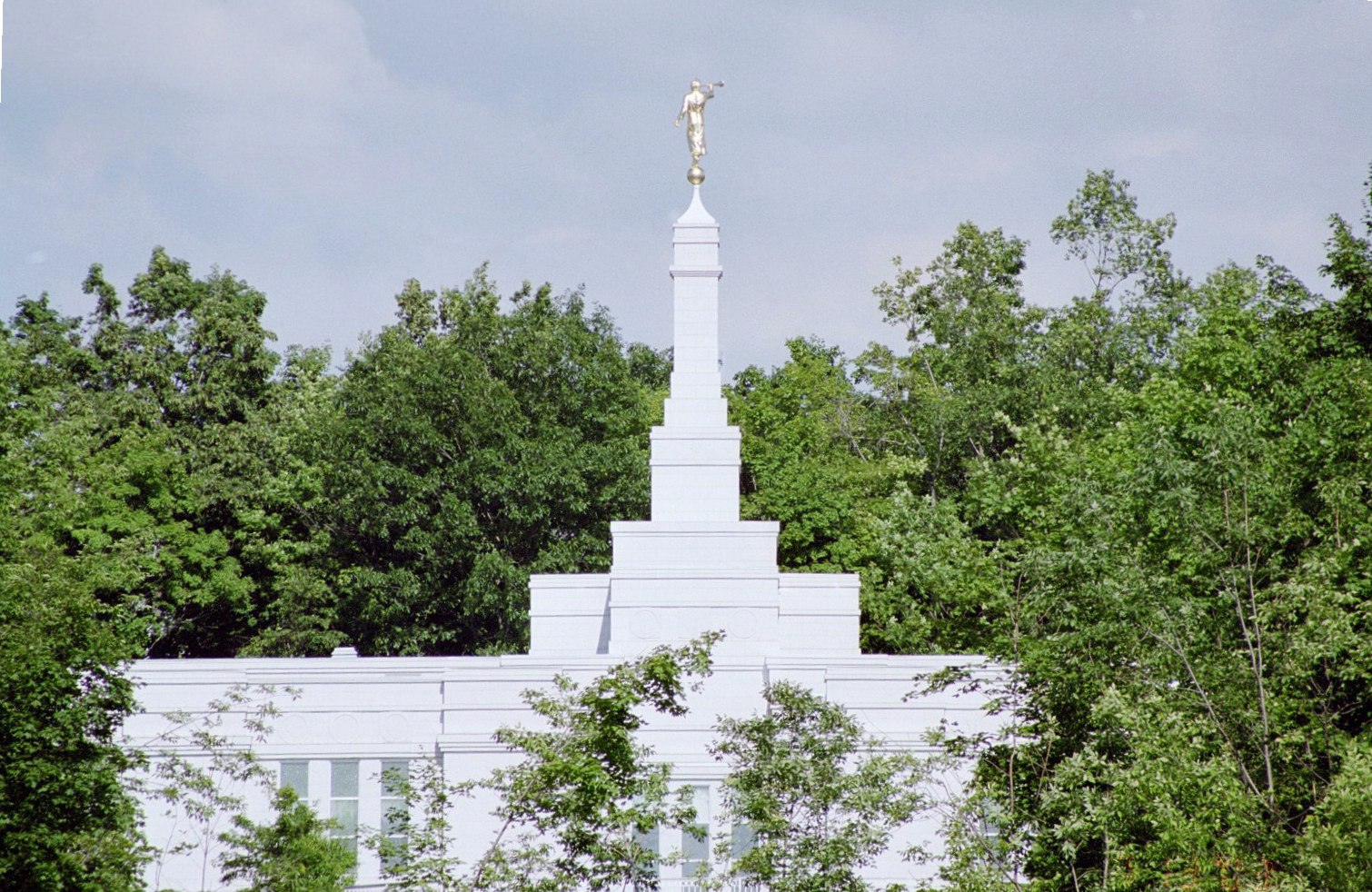
- Palmyra Temple as seen from the Sacred Grove
- Interactive map of Palmyra New York Temple
- Number: 77
- Dedication: April 6, 2000, by Gordon B. Hinckley
- Site: 5 acres (2.0 ha)
- Floor area: 10,900 ft^{2} (1,010 m^{2})
- Height: 71 ft (22 m)
- Official website • News & images

Church chronology
← Louisville Kentucky Temple	Palmyra New York Temple	→ Fresno California Temple

Additional information
- Announced: February 21, 1999, by Gordon B. Hinckley
- Groundbreaking: May 25, 1999, by Gordon B. Hinckley
- Open house: March 25 – April 1, 2000
- Current president: Daniel Kimbler
- Designed by: Dave A. Richards; Church A&E Services
- Location: Manchester and Palmyra, New York, United States
- Coordinates: 43°2′20.09039″N 77°14′12.80040″W
- Exterior finish: Bethel White granite
- Design: Classic modern, single spire
- Baptistries: 1
- Ordinance rooms: 2 (two-stage progressive)
- Sealing rooms: 2
- Visitors' center: Yes

The Palmyra New York Temple is the 77th operating temple of the Church of Jesus Christ of Latter-day Saints. The intent to build the temple was announced on February 9, 1999. It was the first temple built in New York.

The temple site, atop a wooded hill in western New York, is in an area prominent in the early history of the Latter Day Saint movement. Nearby is the grove of trees known as the Sacred Grove where the church's founder and first president, Joseph Smith, said he saw God the Father and Jesus Christ, an event known as the First Vision. The temple grounds, on the border between the towns of Manchester and Palmyra, are also on the grounds of the original Smith Family Farm. The church was organized thirty miles away in Fayette, New York in 1830.

The temple has a single spire topped with a statue of the angel Moroni. The temple was designed by Dave A. Richards and church architectural services, using a classic modern style. A groundbreaking ceremony, to signify the beginning of construction, was held on May 25, 1999, conducted by church president Gordon B. Hinckley.

== History ==
The temple was announced by the First Presidency in a letter to local church leaders on February 9, 1999. The site was selected due to its significance to the church. At the groundbreaking ceremony, held May 25, 1999, Hinckley commented on the area's rich history, saying that it was in that locale that the church truly began to grow. Hinckley also marveled at how much the church had grown since its founding in 1830.

Local reaction to the new temple was positive and more than 30,700 visitors toured it before it was dedication. The temple serves about 18,000 church members within seven stakes. The temple was dedicated by Hinckley on April 6, 2000, the 170th anniversary of the church' organization. About 1,200 members attended the dedicatory sessions inside the temple, while nearly 1.5 million members viewed the broadcast of the services throughout the United States and Canada.

The temple has a total of 10,700 square feet (990 m^{2}), two ordinance rooms, and two sealing rooms. The exterior is white marble. Forty art glass windows inside the temple depict local events in the church's history. A gold statue of the angel Moroni tops the single spire. Ornate carved cherry wood railings, wainscoting, and moldings line the halls, along with hand-sculpted carpeting.

In 2020, like all others in the church, the Palmyra New York Temple was closed in response to the COVID-19 pandemic.

== Design and architecture ==
The building has a classic modern style, coupled with a traditional Latter-day Saint temple design. The temple's architecture reflects the cultural heritage of Palmyra and its spiritual significance to the church.

The temple is on a 5-acre (2.0 ha) near several sites important to the church’s history, including the Sacred Grove and the Hill Cumorah. At the bottom of the hill where the temple sits are two homes where the Smith family lived: a replica of a log cabin and a white frame house.

The structure stands 71 feet tall and is constructed with Bethel White granite. The exterior is characterized by stained-glass depictions of the Sacred Grove and a statue of the angel Moroni. The design uses elements that reflect both the local culture and broader church symbolism.

The interior features a mural of the First Vision, and the temple lobby has clear windows to provide views of the Sacred Grove. There are cherrywood moldings throughout the temple’s interior. The temple includes two sealing rooms, two ordinance rooms, a celestial room, and a baptistry.

The design uses elements representing Latter-day Saint symbolism, providing spiritual meaning to the temple's appearance and function. Symbolism is an important subject to church members and include the angel Moroni statue on top of the temple’s steeple. To church members, the statue represents “the restoration of the gospel of Jesus Christ” through Joseph Smith.

== Temple presidents ==
The church's temples are directed by a temple president and matron, each serving for a term of three years. The president and matron oversee the administration of temple operations and provide guidance and training for both temple patrons and staff.

The first president of the Palmyra New York Temple was Dale S. Dallon, with the matron being Barbara J. Dallon. As of 2024, Daniel Kimbler is the president, with Karen Kimbler serving as matron.

== Admittance ==
Following the completion of the temple, the church announced that a public open house would be held from March 25-April 1, 2000. The temple was dedicated by Gordon B. Hinckley on April 6, 2000. Like all the church's temples, it is not used for Sunday worship services. To members of the church, temples are regarded as sacred houses of the Lord. Once dedicated, only church members with a current temple recommend can enter for worship.

Temples in the Northeastern United States
- = Operating
- = Under construction
- = Announced
- = Temporarily Closed

== See also ==
- Comparison of temples (LDS Church)
- List of temples (LDS Church)
- List of temples by geographic region (LDS Church)
- Temple architecture (LDS Church)
