= George Edward Anderson =

American photographer

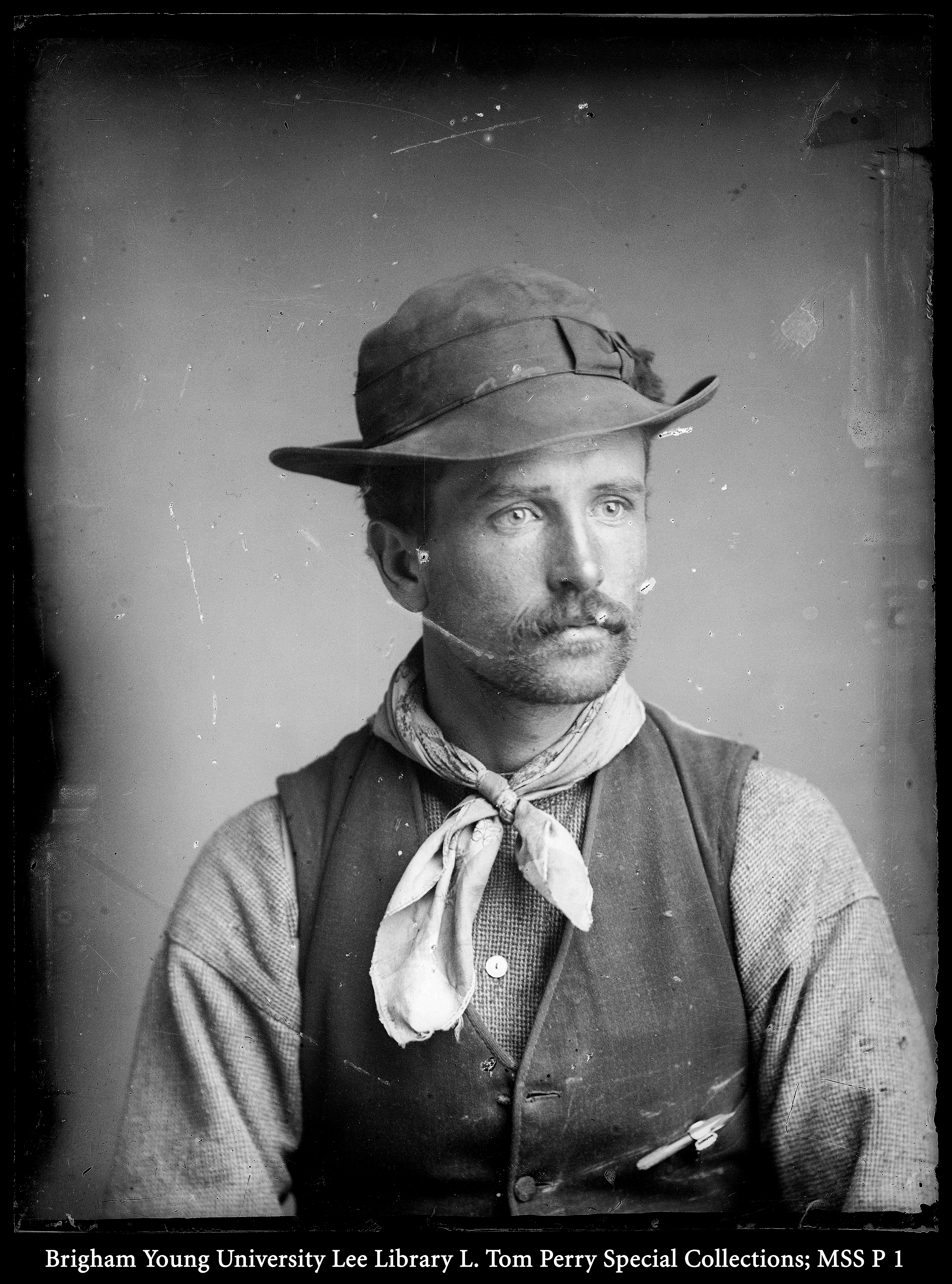
A photo of George Edward Anderson, Mormon photographer, between c. 1880 and c. 1910

George Edward Anderson (October 28, 1860 – May 9, 1928) was an early American photographer known for his portraiture and documentary photographs of early historical sites of the Church of Jesus Christ of Latter-day Saints (LDS Church) and Utah settlements.

== Biography ==
George Edward Anderson was born in Salt Lake City, Utah, and apprenticed as a teenager under photographer Charles Roscoe Savage. At Savage's Art Bazar Studio, Anderson became friends with fellow apprentices John Hafen and John F. Bennett. Hafen later become an accomplished artist and Bennett was instrumental in preserving Anderson's glass plate negatives.

At seventeen, Anderson established his photography studio in Salt Lake City with his brothers, Stanley and Adam. The railroad allowed Anderson to establish tent studios in Manti, Utah, Springville, Utah, and Nephi, Utah. In 1886 Anderson opened a stationary studio he named Temple Bazar in Manti where the LDS Church was building a new temple. While in Manti he met Olive Lowry, whom he married on May 30, 1888. They were the second couple to be married in the newly finished Mormon temple in Manti, Utah. Later that year Anderson sold his Manti studio and moved to Springville. There, Anderson employed apprentices, some of which went on to become well-known photographers, such as Elfie Huntington and Joseph Bagley. Anderson used his traveling tent studio, setting up in small towns throughout central, eastern, and southern Utah, where he documented the lives of residents in the years 1884 to 1907.

=== LDS mission ===
In 1907 Anderson was called to serve a mission in England. After traveling to the east to board his ship in April 1907, Anderson decided to take photos of religious landmarks. This culminated in almost a year taking photos in the Eastern United States. Anderson left the United States in April 1908 to travel to England where he proselyted and took photos. On March 27, 1910, Anderson was released from his mission, however, he stayed another year and a half while he continued proselyting and documenting the area with photography. Upon his return to America, Anderson took John Collett an eleven-year-old, crippled boy back to the states with him. Anderson returned to the United States setting up a photography studio in South Royalton, Vermont, near the birthplace of LDS prophet Joseph Smith. He added a number of Church history site photographs, as well as portraits of Church members and local residents to his growing collection. In November 1913, almost seven years since Anderson left on his mission, he returned to his family and home in Springville, Utah.

=== Later years ===
After a seven-year absence his photographic business was unhealthy and his family life was strained. Business and money were not Anderson's motivating forces; art and religion were. Continuing to experience financial and marital strains, Anderson tried to revive his traveling tent studio but with little success. He was able to earn some money from the sale of The Birth of Mormonism booklet, which he published many years before. The last years of Anderson's life were spent in documenting families and life in Utah Valley and traveling to newly constructed temples. In 1923 he traveled to Cardston, Alberta, Canada with LDS Church authorities for the dedication of that city's LDS temple. He spent two years in Canada, returning to Springville in 1925. He became ill in the fall of 1927, and despite his wife's urging not to go, Anderson went with LDS Church officials to document the dedication of a temple in Mesa, Arizona. It was his last trip. He died of heart failure on May 9, 1928, after being brought home to Springville, Utah.

== Legacy ==
Although known as a portrait photographer, Anderson's studio portraits are complemented by thousands of documentary portraits taken near homes, barns, and businesses. These photos document families, small town Utah history, railroad history, mining history (including the Scofield mine disaster), and the building of the Church of Jesus Christ of Latter-day Saints temples. Landscape photography was not Anderson's main interest, but his photographs of Church sites are important documents of LDS history. He photographed these sites while traveling across the country to begin his LDS Church mission in England from 1909 to 1911. The Deseret Sunday School Union of the Church published some of the views, as Anderson called them, in a booklet entitled The Birth of Mormonism in Picture. Anderson was essentially unsung as a photographer during his lifetime, only in the last 30 years has Anderson been recognized for his photographic artistry. Primarily, the work of Rell G. Francis along with Nelson Wadsworth and Richard Holzapfel, has brought his work to the attention of this generation.

Charles Reynolds, picture editor of the Popular Photography magazine, commented at a Brigham Young University photo seminar on 11 December 1973 about his introduction to Anderson's photographs. After attending an exhibition at the Springville Museum of Art, arranged by Rell Francis, he said "I go to shows several times a week in New York City . . . and I have rarely seen anything as impressive as those photographs. . . . It is awfully hard to astonish me. . . . The George Anderson pictures that I saw today weren't sensationalized pictures in any way. They were very sweet, beautiful, lovely pictures. . . ."

== Selected works ==
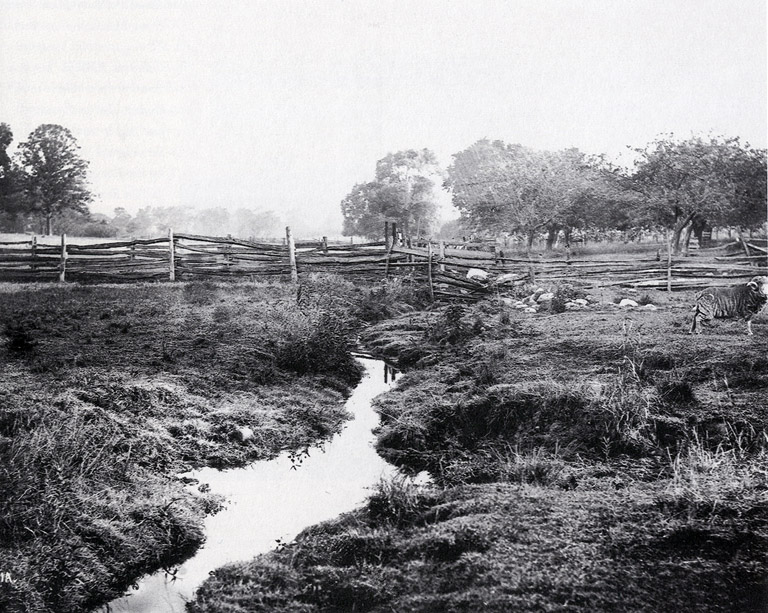
George Edward Anderson's photo of the Smith Family Farm in Manchester, New York

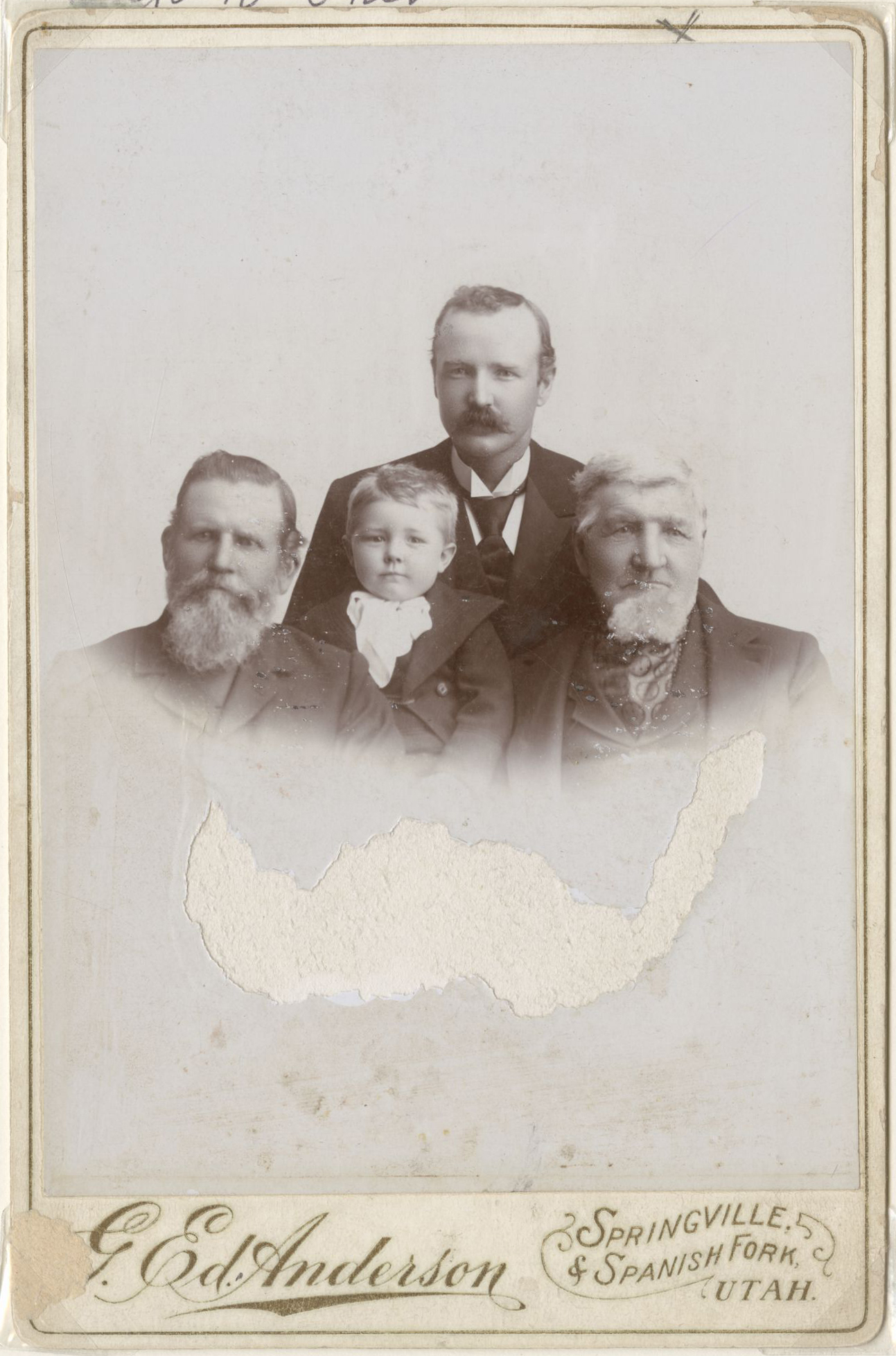
Archibald Gardner and family

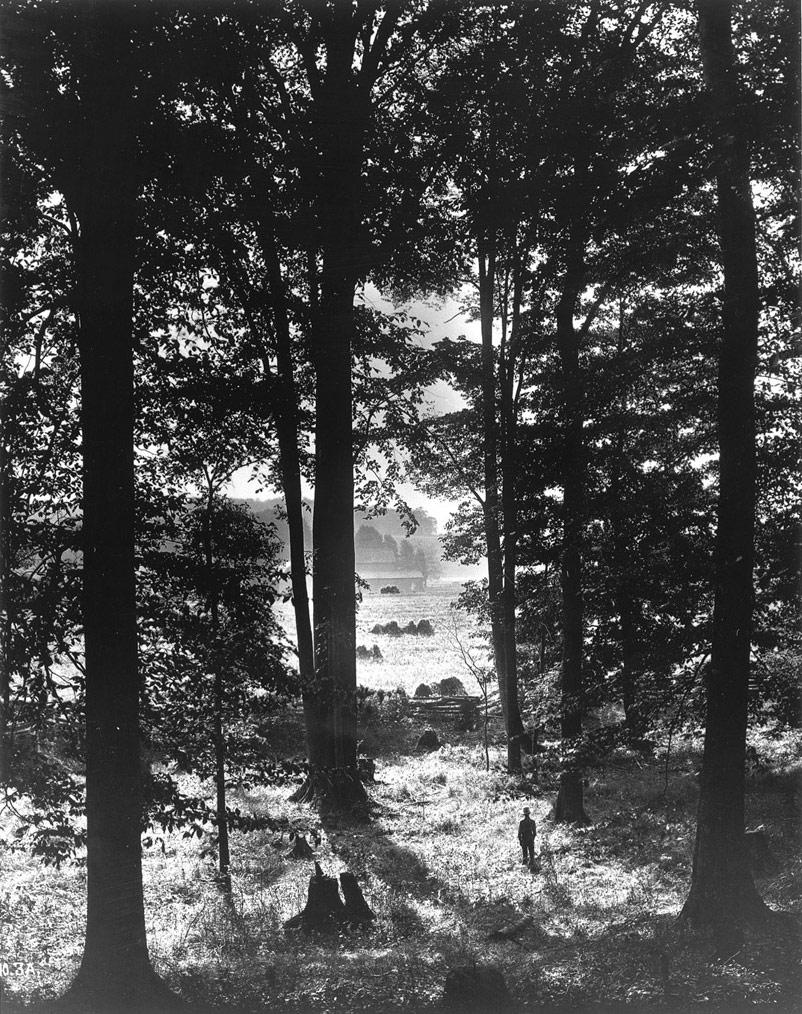
Sacred Grove (1907)

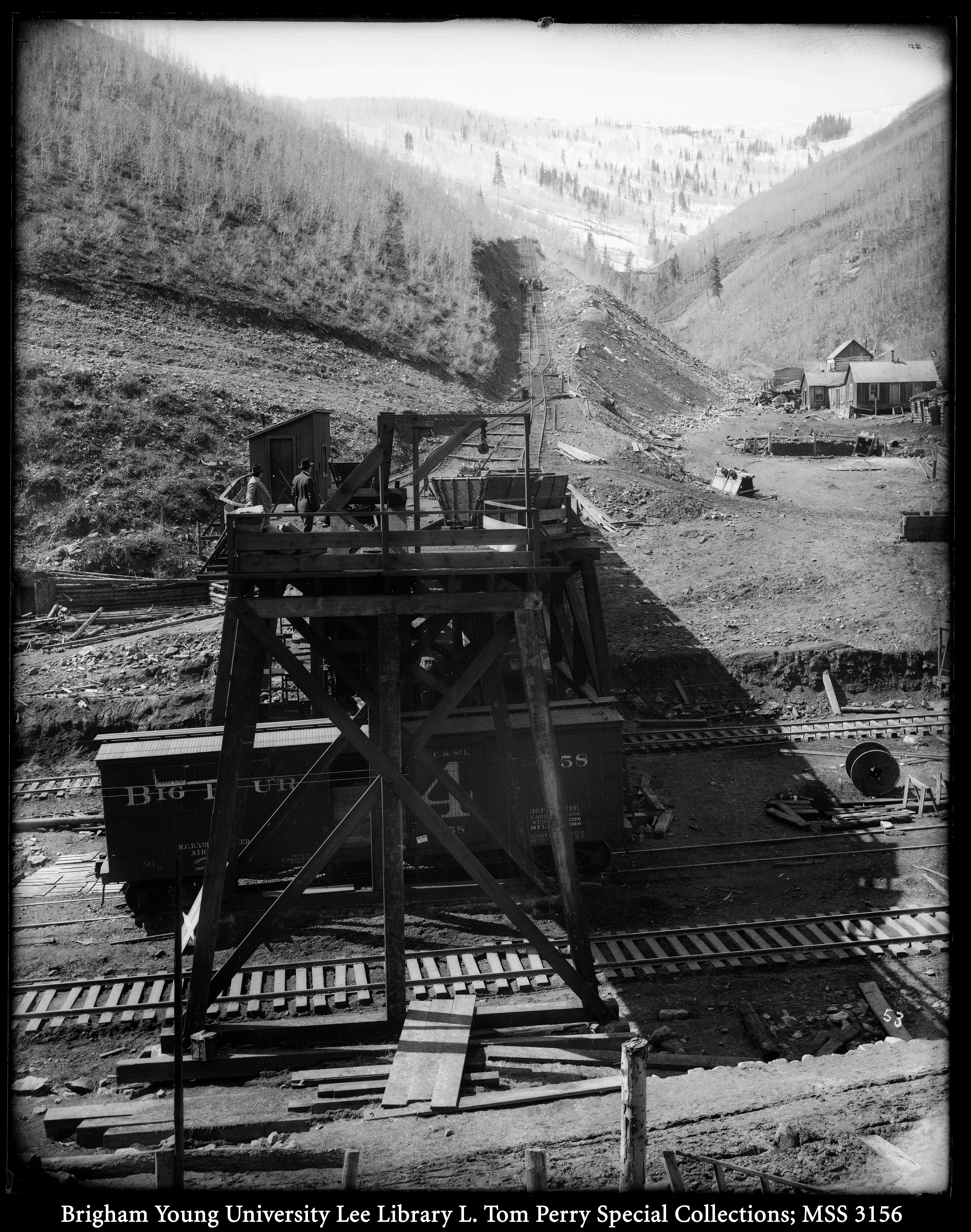
A photograph, taken outdoors, of men working on railroad tracks. There are two sets of tracks running horizontally and one set running up a hill to the distance. There is what appears to be a large chute over the two horizontal tracks. The vertical tracks are likely to be mining tracks with a coal car on them.

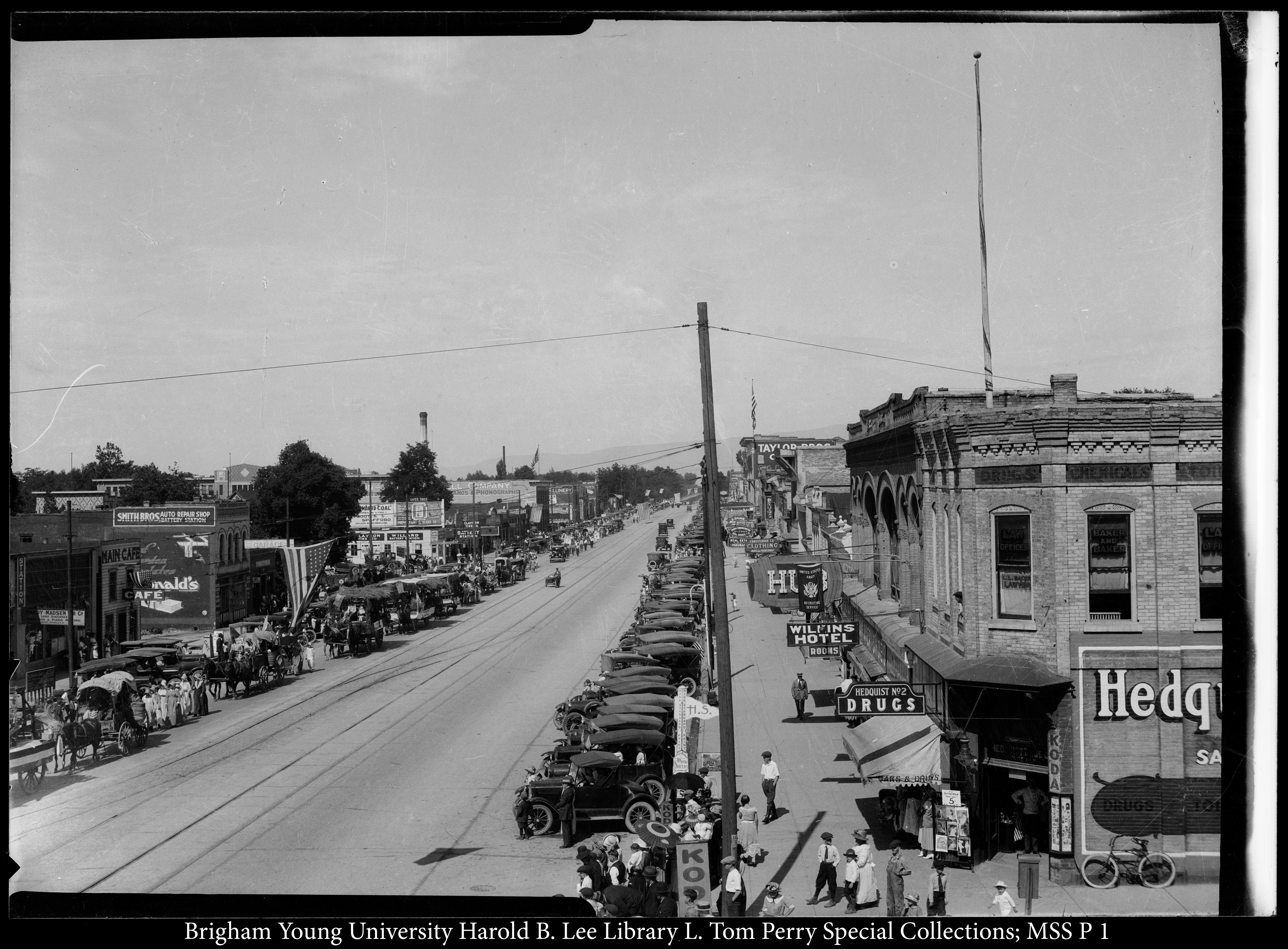
Center Street at 100 West facing west, with a parade on the south side of Center Street. Numerous automobiles line the street and businesses such as Hedquist Drugs, Wilkins Hotel, Taylor Brothers, and Smith Brothers Auto Repair Shop line the street.

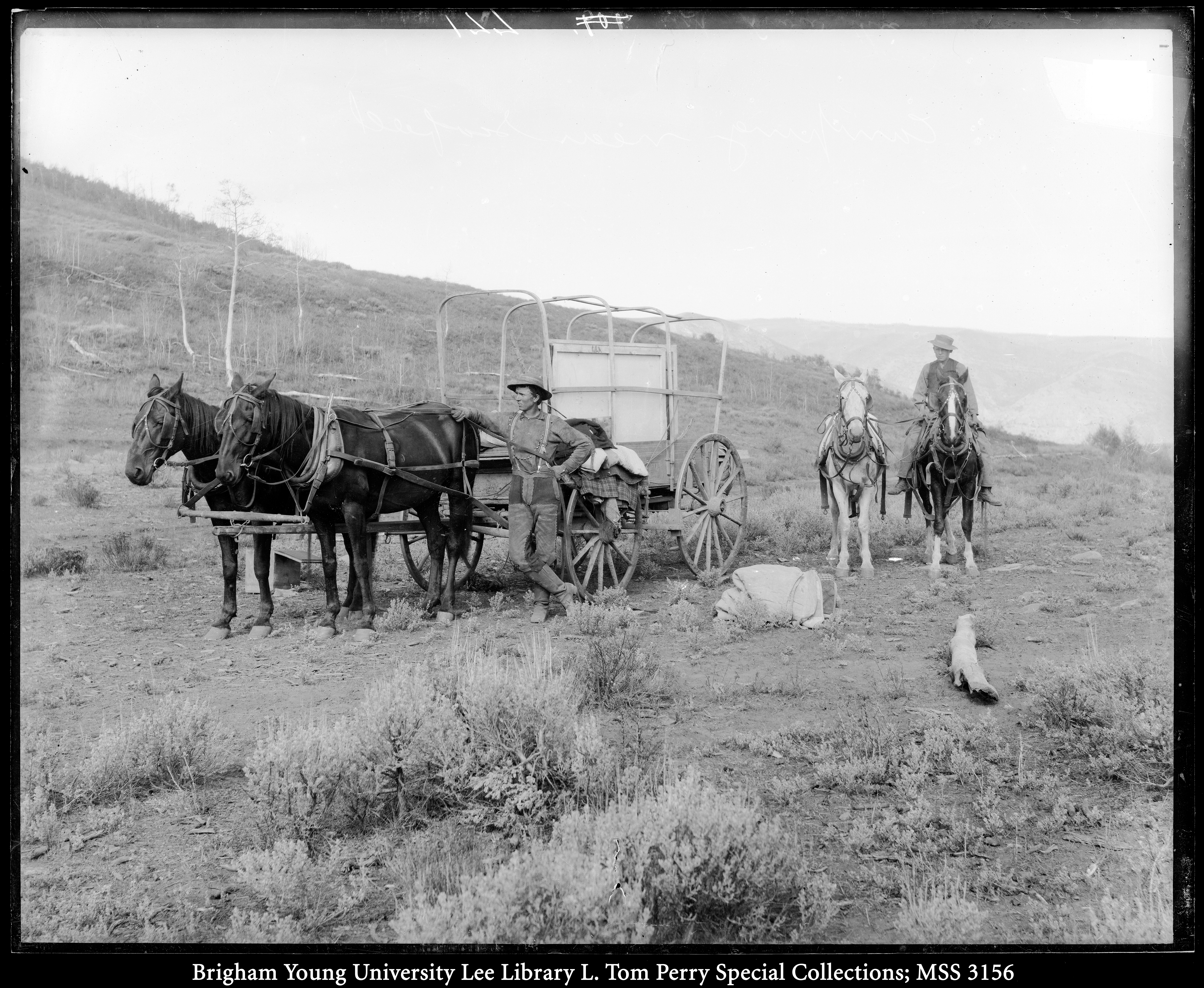
A man standing next to two horses that are harnessed to a wagon and another man is riding a horse and holding a spare horse behind the wagon. Taken outdoors.
