= First Vision =

Theophany that Joseph Smith received in the spring of 1820

Coordinates: 43.040669°N 77.244404°W

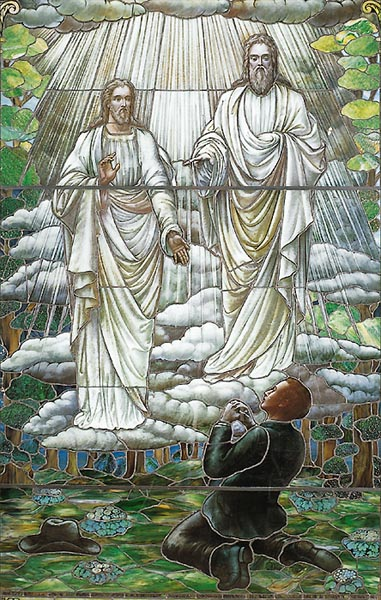
Stained glass depiction of Joseph Smith's First Vision, completed in 1913 by an unknown artist (Church History Museum, Salt Lake City).

The First Vision (also called the Grove Experience by members of the Community of Christ) refers to a theophany which Latter Day Saints believe Joseph Smith experienced in the early 1820s, in a wooded area in Manchester, New York, called the Sacred Grove. Smith described it as a vision in which he received instruction from God the Father and Jesus Christ.

According to the account Smith told in 1838, he went to the woods to pray about which church to join but fell into the grip of an evil power that nearly overcame him. At the last moment, he was rescued by two shining "Personages" (implied to be God the Father and Jesus) who hovered above him. One of the beings told Smith not to join any of the existing churches because they all taught incorrect doctrines.

Smith wrote several accounts of the vision between 1832 and 1842, two of which were published in his lifetime. Consistency of the accounts is a subject of debate, whether variations are indicators of significant shifts in Smith's theology or are simply changing emphasis of minor details. The First Vision is revered in Latter-day Saint theology as the first step in the Latter Day Saint restoration. Although it was relatively unknown to early adherents to the Latter Day Saint movement, Joseph Smith's 1838 account became widely circulated within a few years. The event grew in emphasis in the Church of Jesus Christ of Latter-day Saints in the late 19th century. For Latter-day Saints, the First Vision corroborates distinctive doctrines such as the bodily nature of God the Father and the uniqueness of the Restored Gospel of Jesus Christ as the only true path to exaltation.

== Story of the vision ==
Smith wrote or dictated several versions of his vision story, and told the story to others who later published what they remember hearing. Taken together, these accounts set forth the following details:

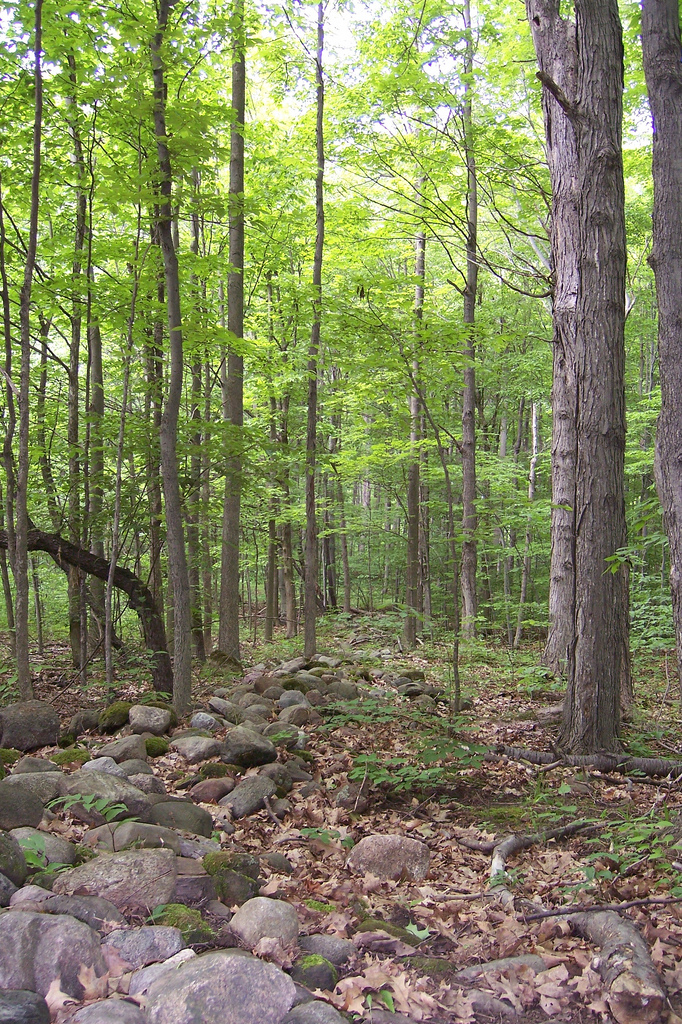
Joseph Smith said his first vision occurred in a grove of trees near his home.

Smith said that when he was about twelve (c. 1817–18), he became interested in religion and distressed about his sins. He studied the Bible and attended church, but the accounts differ as to whether he determined on his own that there was no existing religion built upon the true teachings of Jesus or whether the idea that all churches were false had not "entered his heart" until he experienced the vision. During this period of religious concern, he determined to turn to God in prayer. An early account says the purpose of this prayer was to ask God for mercy for his sins while later accounts emphasize his desire to know which church he should join. Smith said he went one spring morning to a secluded grove near his home to pray. He said he went to a stump in a clearing where he had left his axe the day before and began to offer his first audible prayer.

He said his prayer was interrupted by a "being from the unseen world." Smith said the being caused his tongue to swell in his mouth so that he could not speak. One account said he heard a noise behind him like someone walking towards him and then, when he tried to pray again, the noise grew louder, causing him to spring to his feet and look around, but he saw no one. In some of the accounts, he described being covered with a thick darkness and thinking that he would be destroyed. At his darkest moment, he knelt a third time to pray and, as he summoned all his power to pray, he felt ready to sink into oblivion. At that moment, he said his tongue was loosed and he saw a vision.

Smith said he saw a pillar of light brighter than the noonday sun that slowly descended on him, growing in brightness as it descended and lighting the entire area for some distance. As the light reached the tree tops, Smith feared the trees might catch fire. But when it reached the ground and enveloped him, it produced a "peculiar sensation." "[H]is mind was caught away from the natural objects with which he was surrounded; and he was enwrapped in a heavenly vision."

While experiencing the vision, he said he saw one or more "personages", described differently in Smith's accounts. In his earliest written account, Smith said he "saw the Lord." In diary entries, he said he saw a "visitation of Angels" or a "vision of angels" that included "a personage," and then "another personage" who testified that "Jesus Christ is the Son of God," as well as "many angels". In later accounts, Smith consistently said that he had seen two personages who appeared one after the other. These personages "exactly resembled each other in their features or likeness." The first personage had "light complexion, blue eyes, a piece of white cloth drawn over his shoulders, his right arm bare." In later accounts, one of the personages called Smith by name "and said, (pointing to the other), 'This is my beloved Son, hear him.'" Although Smith did not explicitly identify the personages, most Latter Day Saints infer that they were God the Father and Jesus.

In two accounts, Smith said that the Lord told him his sins were forgiven, that he should obey the commandments, that the world was corrupt, and that the Second Coming was approaching. Later accounts say that when the personages appeared, Smith asked them "O Lord, what church shall I join?" or "Must I join the Methodist Church?" In answer, he was told that "all religious denominations were believing in incorrect doctrines, and that none of them was acknowledged of God as his church and kingdom." All churches and their professors were "corrupt", and "all their creeds were an abomination in his sight." Smith was told not to join any of the churches, but that the fullness of the gospel would be made known to him at a later time. After the vision withdrew, Smith said he came to and found himself sprawled on his back.

== Context ==
=== Background ===
Smith was born on December 23, 1805, in Sharon, Vermont, and in 1816, his family moved to a farm just outside the town of Palmyra, New York. In the first several decades of American society in the 1800s, there was a proliferation of religious options. During the Second Great Awakening, revivals occurred in many communities in the northeastern United States. The religious environment in the region where the Smith family lived was so intense it is referred to today as the burned-over district. In the Palmyra area itself, large multi-denominational revivals occurred in 1816–17 and 1824–25. Within eight miles of the Smith family farm, at least four Methodist, three Presbyterian, two Baptist, and several Quaker groups held regular meetings. Despite the large number of congregations however, only about 11% of Palmyra residents belonged to any organized religion in 1820, which was in line with the national average.

Besides organized religion, the Smith family was exposed to a number of other belief systems. A large ill-defined group of early Americans have been lumped into the term "seekers". This group held a heterogeneous set of beliefs; including that religion with creeds were unnecessary and the apostolic church no longer was on the earth. Cunning folk traditions or folk magic was also prevalent in Palmyra; intertwined and considered congruous with Christianity. Deism, the belief that God exists but does not intervene in earth, also had a growing hold in American culture with the publication of Thomas Paine's popular book The Age of Reason.

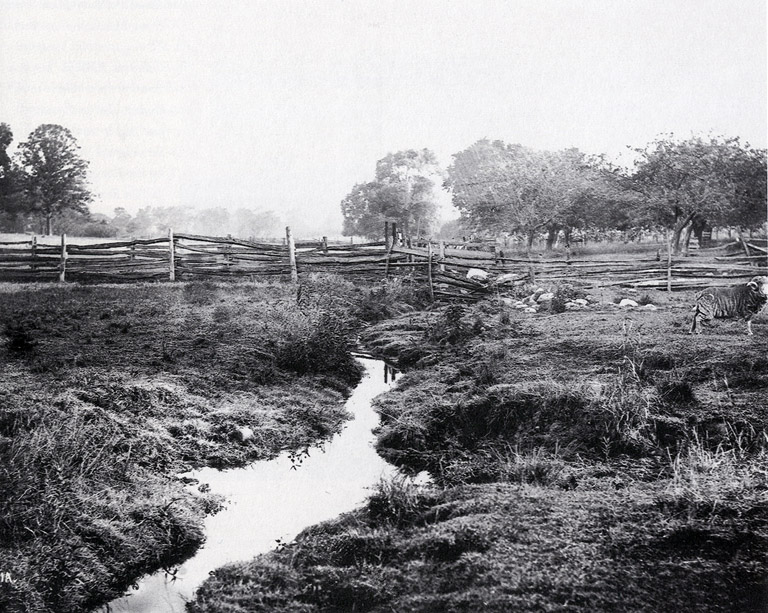
George Edward Anderson's photograph of the Smith Family Farm in Manchester, New York, c. 1907. (LDS Archives)

Richard Bushman has called the spiritual tradition of the Smith family "a religious melee." Like many other Americans living on the frontier at the beginning of the 19th century, Smith and his family believed in visions, dreams, and other communications with God. In 1811, Smith's maternal grandfather, Solomon Mack, described a series of visions and voices from God that resulted in his conversion to Christianity at the age of seventy-six.

Joseph Smith's mother, Lucy Mack Smith, had a "believers baptism" early in her marriage, but did not formally join to any denomination early in her marriage. Joseph Smith Sr. was a combination of deist and seeker, who was skeptical of organized religion, but not irreligious. Before Smith was born, Lucy went to a grove near her home in Vermont and prayed about her husband's repudiation of evangelical religion. That night she said she had a dream which she interpreted as a prophecy that Joseph Sr. would later accept the "pure and undefiled Gospel of the Son of God." She also stated that Smith Sr. had a number of dreams or visions between 1811 and 1819, the first of which occurring when his mind was "much excited upon the subject of religion." The first of Joseph Sr.'s visions confirmed to him the correctness of his refusal to join any organized religious group. Smith's father additionally joined the local masonic lodge, with Smith's older brother Hyrum sometime shortly after arriving in Palmyra.

Smith's older brother Alvin did not join any organized religion. Lucy said that after Alvin died in late 1823, she sought comfort in religion, and formally joined the Presbyterian church in either 1824 or 1825 along with her children Hyrum, Samuel and Sophronia.

=== Dating the First Vision ===
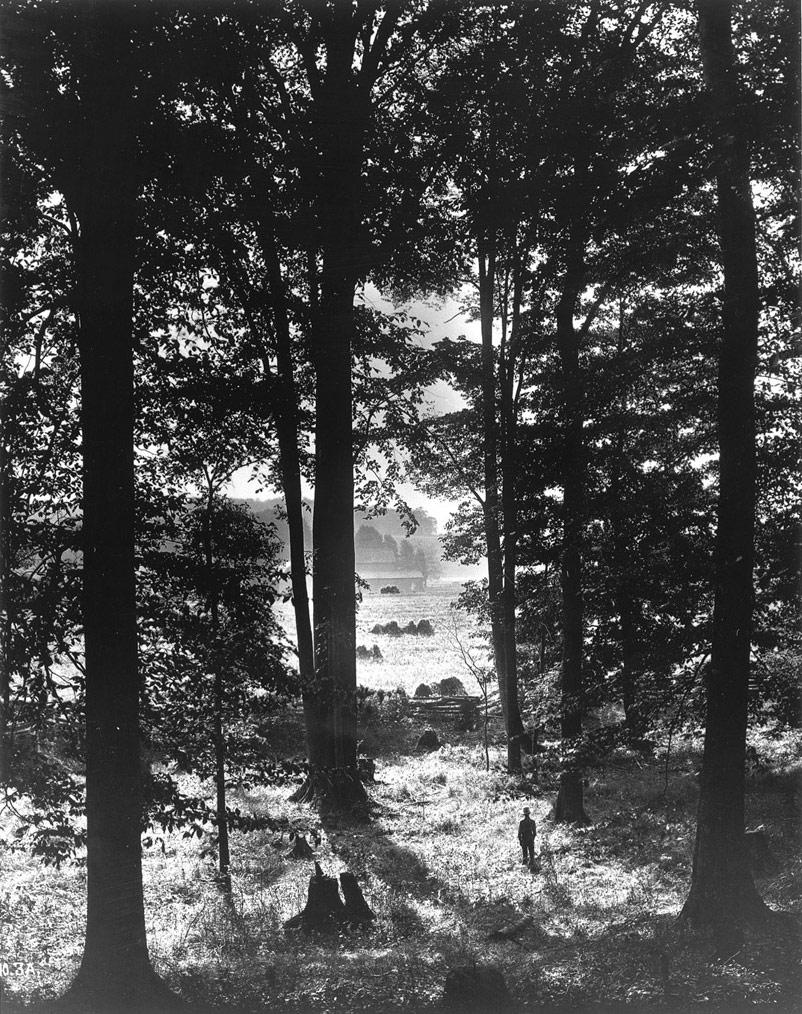
Photograph of the Sacred Grove by George Edward Anderson, circa 1907

Smith never gave a specific date of his reported vision, but said it occurred in the early 1820s, when he was in his early teens. In the 1832 account Smith says that from age twelve to fifteen he was pondering the situation of the world in his heart, placing the vision in 1821. Smith's scribe Frederick G. Williams inserted into the 1832 account that it had occurred "in the 16th year of [his] age" or 1821. In the 1838 account, Smith said the vision took place "early in the spring of eighteen hundred and twenty." In both his 1835 and 1842 account, Smith wrote that it occurred when "about fourteen years of age."

Historians have looked at contextual clues from the accounts to further narrow down the date. In the 1838 account Smith noted the following events:

- "Sometime in the second year after our removal to Manchester, there was in the place where we lived an unusual excitement on the subject of religion"
- "(The unusual excitement) commenced with the Methodist"
- "(The unusual excitement) soon became general among all the sects in that region of country, ... and great multitudes united themselves to the different religious parties, which created no small stir and division among the people"
- "My Fathers family was proselyted to the Presbyterian faith and four of them joined that Church, Namely, My Mother Lucy, My Brothers Hyrum, Samuel Harrison, and my Sister Sophronia."
- "It was on the morning of a beautiful clear day early in the spring"

Each of these details have been the subject of significant research and debated widely among historians, critics, apologists and polemicists, sparking a variety of historical and theological interpretations. In the fall of 1967 the Reverend Wesley P. Walters published a pamphlet asserting that the "unusual excitement" Joseph Smith wrote of matched the Palmyra revival of 1824, and was anachronistic to the 1820 setting. Walters' pamphlet created a stir, and provoked a strong response from scholars at Brigham Young University (BYU). By spring of 1968 BYU Professor Truman G. Madsen organized around three dozen scholars to respond to Walters, and wrote to the First Presidency of the LDS Church that the "first vision has come under severe historical attack." Walters's thesis and the subsequent response has framed the historical debate.

==== Dating the move to Manchester ====
Local moves of the Smith family have been used in attempts to identify the date of the vision. Smith wrote that the First Vision occurred in "the second year after our removal to Manchester." The evidence for the date of this move has been interpreted by many believers as supporting 1820 and by non-believers as supporting 1824. Manchester land assessment records show an increase in assessed value of the Smith property in 1823. Because the tax assessment of the Smiths' Manchester land rose in 1823, critics argue that the Smiths completed their Manchester cabin in 1822, which suggests an approximate date of 1824 for the First Vision. Joseph Smith Sr. was first taxed for Manchester land in 1820. In 1821 and 1822, the land was valued at $700, but in 1823, the property was assessed at $1000, which may indicate "that the Smiths had completed construction of their cabin and cleared a significant portion of their land". In response, some Mormon apologists argue that in 1818, the Smiths mistakenly constructed a cabin 59 feet north of the actual property line (which would have been in Palmyra rather than Manchester) and the 1823 increase in the property assessment was related to the completion of a wood frame home on the Manchester side of the Palmyra–Manchester township line. The latter interpretation would lend support for dating the First Vision to 1820.

==== Dating the revival ====
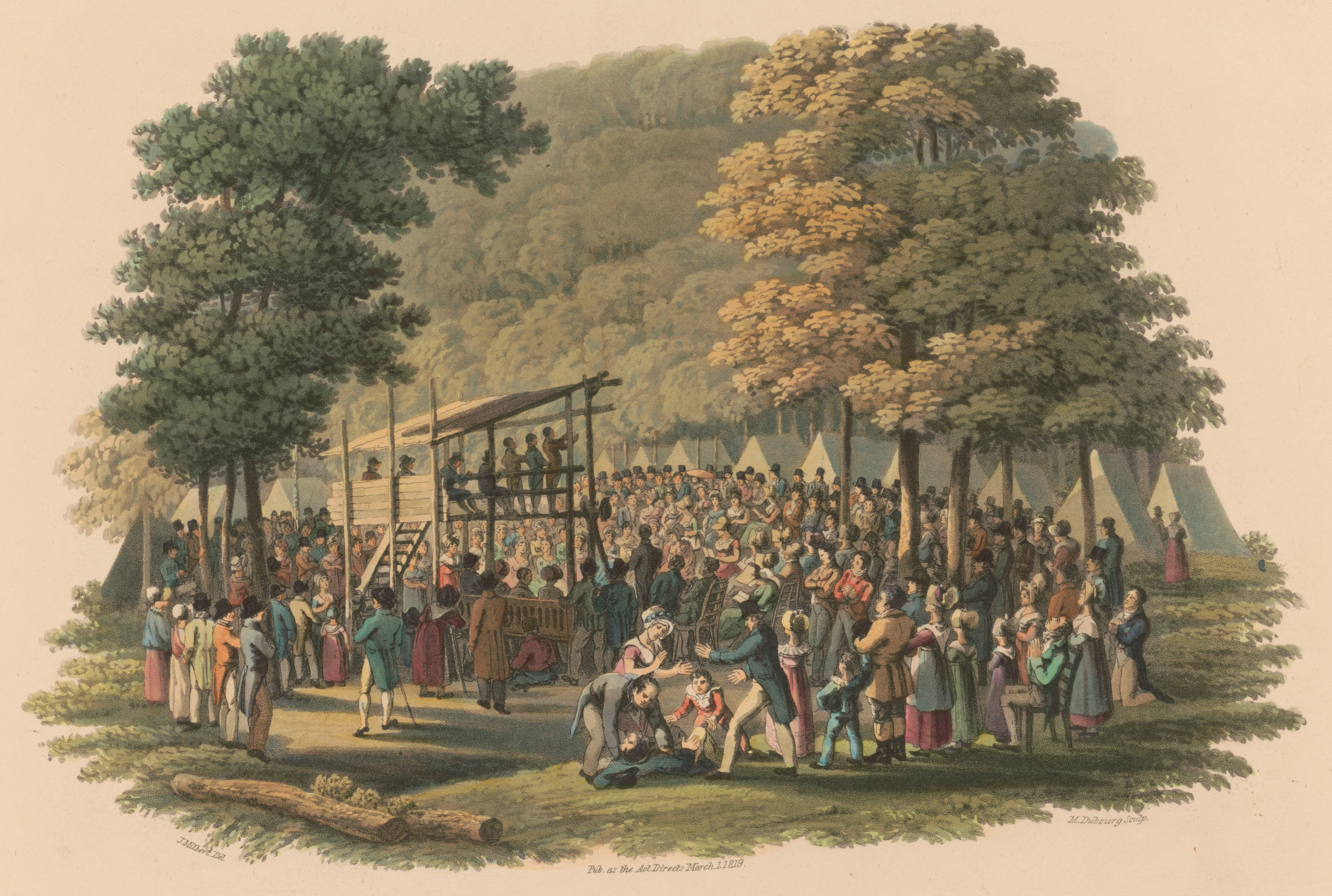
Typical scene from a Methodist camp meeting

Richard Bushman wrote that Smith "began to be concerned about religion in late 1817 or early 1818, when the aftereffects of the revival of 1816 and 1817 were still being felt." Milton V. Backman wrote that religious outbreaks occurred in 1819–20 within a fifty-mile radius of Smith's home: "Church records, newspapers, religious journals, and other contemporary sources clearly reveal that great awakenings occurred in more than fifty western New York towns or villages during the revival of 1819–1820 .... Primary sources also specify that great multitudes joined the Methodist, Presbyterian, and Calvinist Baptist societies in the region of country where Joseph Smith lived." Richard Lloyd Anderson has pointed out that there was a Methodist Camp Meeting in Palmyra in 1818, with about 400 in attendance, that is verified by a contemporary journal. This agrees with the three-year time frame of his pondering on religion mentioned in Smith's 1832 account. Backman cited evidence of a Methodist Camp Meeting in Palmyra in June 1820.

==== Dating the Smith family conversions to Presbyterianism ====
In the 1838 version of the First Vision (first published in 1842) that has been canonized by the LDS Church, his family's decision to join the Presbyterian Church occurs in the same year as his First Vision.

The draft copy of Lucy Mack Smith's history does not mention the first vision at all. However, the fair copy, penned by the same scribe as the draft copy, and which was in the possession of Lucy and on which she registered a copyright, includes in the narrative a copy of the 1838 version of the first vision, beginning with Joseph's words "I was at this time in my fifteenth year." After the first vision account, Lucy continues with "From this time until the 21st of Sep. 1823, Joseph continued as usual to labor with his father; and nothing during this interval occurred of very great importance..." At this point Lucy describes the visitations of Moroni and the promise of the golden plates, followed by the death of Alvin, in November 1823.

Lucy then states that she and some of her children sought comfort in the religious revival after Alvin's death. This statement has been taken to refer to her and three of the children (Hyrum, Samuel, and Sophronia) joining the Presbyterian church. If so, and if Joseph's statement that they joined this church in the same year as his first vision is accurate, then the first vision would have taken place in 1824. However, this conclusion requires ignoring both Joseph's statement that the first vision occurred during his fifteenth year and Lucy's chronology in the fair copy. Alternatively, D. Michael Quinn says that Joseph Smith's account is a conflation of events over several years, a typical biographical device for streamlining the narrative.

==== Dating the "beautiful, clear day" ====
In the 1838 account Smith said that this vision occurred "on the morning of a beautiful, clear day, early in the spring of eighteen hundred and twenty." Two LDS Church members collaborated and detailed a claim on their website that the date was March 26, 1820 relying on an interpretation of the Enoch calendar to calculate the date along with weather reports and maple sugar production records. Mark Staker, an expert on the sacred grove site, states that early spring would be "sometime in most likely March, April, or the beginning weeks of May."

==== Dating the Methodist leader's rejection of Smith ====
In his 1838 account, Smith relayed sharing the vision with a Methodist leader. Recalled Smith: "I was greatly surprised at his behavior, he treated my communication not only lightly but with great contempt, saying it was all of the devil, that there was no such thing as visions or revelations in these days, that all such things had ceased with the apostles and that there never would be any more of them." Vogel notes "It is surprising that [Smith] would not anticipate this reaction. According to his own later account, he said that Jesus had declared to him that all the churches were false, that their professors were hypocrites, and that the wicked would soon be destroyed. Little wonder that a minister would disagree with this. But in fact, these details were certainly introduced retrospectively."

One line of thought dates Smith's rejection to 1828, after Smith's first child had died and he had lost the 116 pages. Voguel speculates: "[Smith] undoubtedly wondered if the lost manuscript and the death of his first-born son were signs of God’s displeasure with him. For some time, he was evidently prepared to abandon his quest to translate the plates... It was about this time that Joseph began attending Methodist class meetings with his wife’s family. The class met on Wednesdays, usually at the home of the Reverend Nathaniel Lewis, Emma's uncle." Other members objected to Smith's admission, and claimed "he was a disgrace to the church, that he could not be a member of the church unless he broke off his sins by repentance, made public confession, renounced his fraudulent and hypocritical practices, and gave some evidence that he intended to reform". Faced with a potential disciplinary investigation, Smith withdrew his name from Methodist class membership.

Another line of thought places Smith's rejection by the Methodist leader earlier. Writes Vogel: "placing Smith’s conversation with the minister in the context ofthe 1824-25 revival and the possibility that Smith actually related his 1823 and 1824 encounters with the heavenly messenger on the hill, the minister’s reaction begins to make sense. While the preacher would have found little to condemn in Jesus forgiving a teenager ofhis sins, he certainly would have objected to an encounter with a treasure guardian and the promise of new canon to supplant the primacy of the Bible."

== Recorded accounts of the vision ==
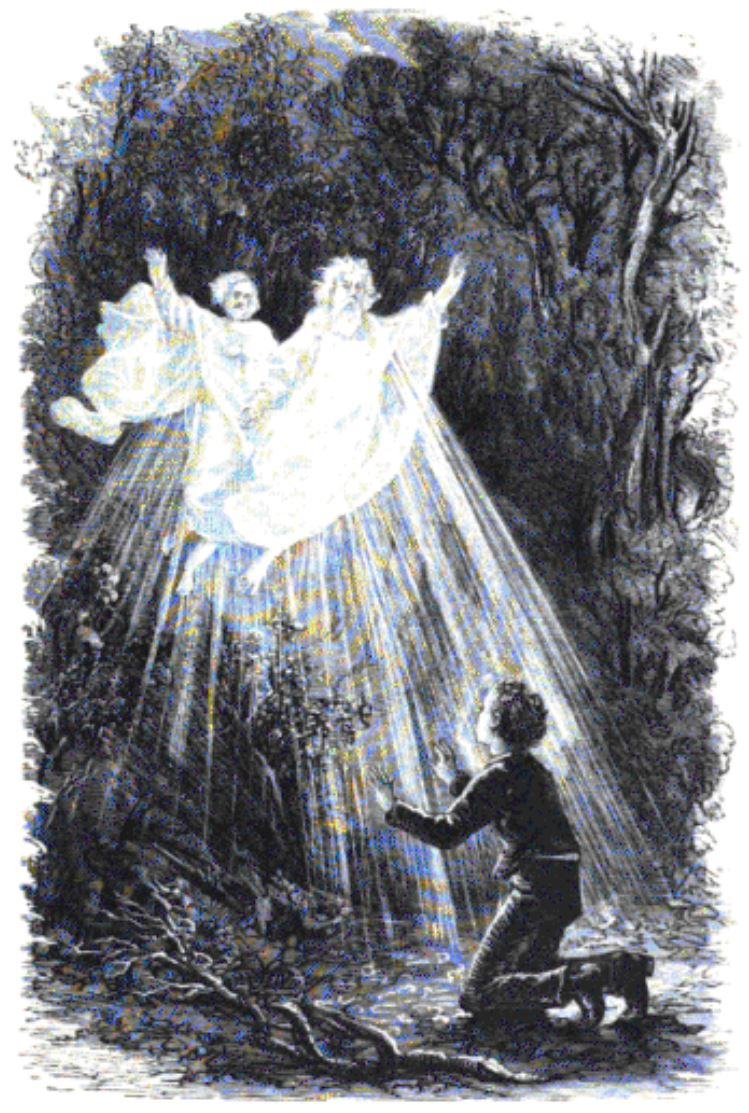
Woodcut by J. Hoey of Joseph Smith's First Vision first published in 1873 in T. B. H. Stenhouse's book Rocky Mountain Saints. This is the earliest known depiction of the First Vision.

The importance of the First Vision within the Latter Day Saint movement evolved over time. There is little evidence that Smith discussed the First Vision publicly prior to 1830. Mormon historian James B. Allen notes that:

The fact that none of the available contemporary writings about Joseph Smith in the 1830s, none of the publications of the Church in that decade, and no contemporary journal or correspondence yet discovered mentions the story of the first vision is convincing evidence that at best it received only limited circulation in those early days.

=== 1830s reference to early Christian regeneration ===
In June 1830, Smith provided the first clear record of a significant personal religious experience prior to the visit of the angel Moroni. At that time, Smith and his associate Oliver Cowdery were establishing the Church of Christ, the first Latter Day Saint church. In the "Articles and Covenants of the Church of Christ," Smith recounted his early history, noting

"For, after that it truly was manifested unto [Smith] that he had received remission of his sins, he was entangled again in the vanities of the world, but after truly repenting, God visited him by an holy angel ... and gave unto him power, by the means which was before prepared that he should translate a book."

No further explanation of this "manifestation" is provided. Although the reference was later linked to the First Vision, its original hearers would have understood the manifestation as simply another of many revival experiences in which the subject testified that his sins had been forgiven.

=== 1832 Smith account ===
The earliest extant account of the First Vision was handwritten by Smith in 1832 in a letter book, but its existence was not known outside the Church History department until it was published in 1965. Sometime around 1930, the pages on which the account was written were torn from the letter book, removed from the Church Historian's collection and placed into a private safe in the custody of Apostle Joseph Fielding Smith. In 1952, General Authority Levi E. Young met with amateur historian LaMar Peterson and told him of a "strange account" in Joseph's handwriting that did not mention God the Father. In 1964, Peterson told Jerald and Sandra Tanner about the account, and they subsequently asked permission from Joseph Fielding Smith to see it, but were denied. In 1964, Smith authorized the showing of the account to Paul R. Cheesman, a BYU student working on his master's thesis. The Tanners obtained a copy of the thesis transcript and the account was published for the first time in 1965.

[T]he Lord heard my cry in the wilderness and while in <the> attitude of calling upon the Lord <in the 16th year of my age> a pillar of fire light above the brightness of the sun at noon day come down from above and rested upon me and I was filled with the spirit of god and the <Lord> opened the heavens upon me and I saw the Lord and he spake unto me saying Joseph <my son> thy sins are forgiven thee. go thy <way> walk in my statutes and keep my commandments behold I am the Lord of glory I was crucifyed for the world that all those who believe on my name may have Eternal life <behold> the world lieth in sin and at this time and none doeth good no not one they have turned aside from the gospel and keep not <my> commandments they draw near to me with their lips while their hearts are far from me and mine anger is kindling against the inhabitants of the earth to visit them according to th[e]ir ungodliness and to bring to pass that which <hath> been spoken by the mouth of the prophets and Ap[o]stles behold and lo I come quickly as it [is] written of me in the cloud <clothed> in the glory of my Father ...."

Unlike Smith's later accounts of the vision, the 1832 account emphasizes personal forgiveness and mentions neither an appearance of God the Father nor the phrase "This is my beloved Son, hear him." In the 1832 account, Smith also stated that before he experienced the First Vision, his own searching of the scriptures had led him to the conclusion that mankind had "apostatized from the true and living faith and there was no society or denomination that built upon the Gospel of Jesus Christ as recorded in the new testament."

=== 1834 Cowdery account ===
In several issues of the Mormon periodical Messenger and Advocate (1834–35), Oliver Cowdery wrote an early biography of Smith. In one issue, Cowdery explained that Smith was confused by the different religions and local revivals during his "15th year" (1820), leading him to wonder which church was the true one. In the next issue of the biography, Cowdery explained that reference to Smith's "15th year" was a typographical error, and that actually the revivals and religious confusion took place in Smith's "17th year."

Therefore, according to Cowdery, the religious confusion led Smith to pray in his bedroom, late on the night of September 23, 1823, after the others had gone to sleep, to know which of the competing denominations was correct and whether "a Supreme being did exist." In response, an angel appeared and granted him forgiveness of his sins. The remainder of the story roughly parallels Smith's later description of a visit by an angel in 1823 who told him about the golden plates. Thus, Cowdery's account, containing a single vision, differs from Smith's 1832 account, which contains two separate visions, one in 1821 prompted by religious confusion (the First Vision) and a separate one regarding the plates on September 22, 1822. Cowdery's account also differs from Smith's 1842 account, which includes a First Vision in 1820 and a second vision on September 22, 1823.

=== 1835 Smith accounts ===
On November 9, 1835, Smith dictated an account of the First Vision in his diary after telling it to a stranger who had visited his home earlier that day. Smith said that when perplexed about religions matters, he had gone to a grove to pray but that his tongue seemed swollen in his mouth and that he had been interrupted twice by the sound of someone walking behind him. Finally, as he prayed, he said his tongue was loosed, and he saw a pillar of fire in which an unidentified "personage" appeared. Then another unidentified personage told Smith his sins were forgiven and "testified unto [Smith] that Jesus Christ is the Son of God." An interlineation in the text notes, "and I saw many angels in this vision." Smith said this vision occurred when he was 14 years old and that when he was 17, he "saw another vision of angels in the night season after I had retired to bed" (referring to the later visit of the angel Moroni who showed him the location of the golden plates). Smith identified none of these personages or angels with "the Lord" as he had in 1832.

A few days later, on November 14, 1835, Smith told the story to another visitor, Erastus Holmes. In his journal, Smith said that he had recited his life story "up to the time I received the first visitation of angels, which was when I was about fourteen years old."

=== 1838 Smith account ===
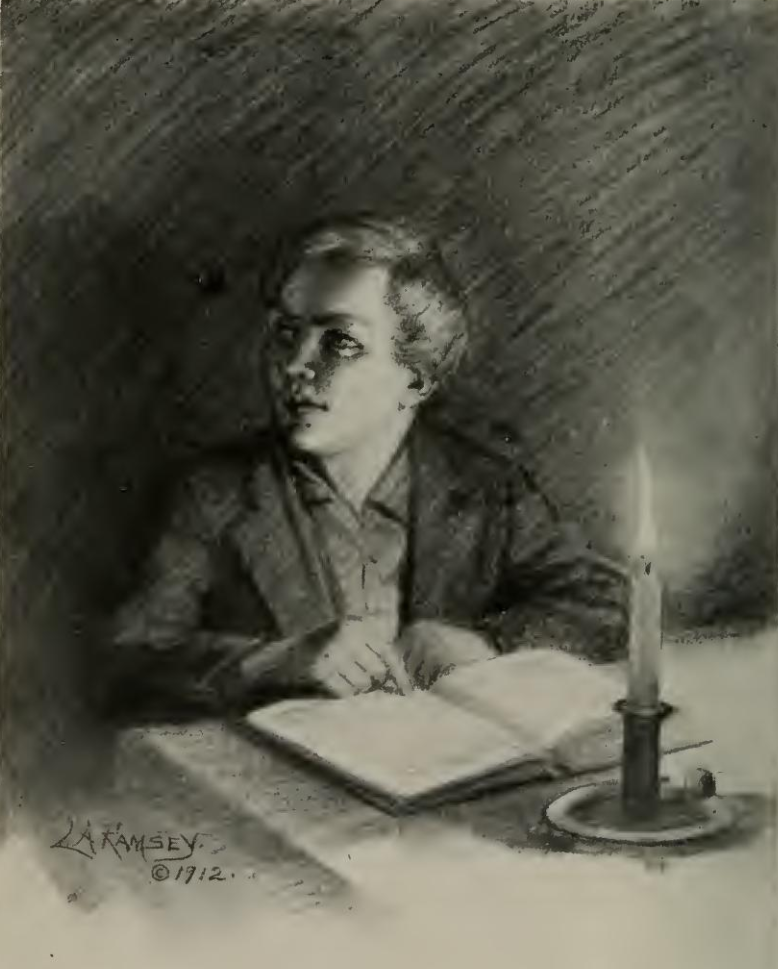
1912 artistic depiction of Joseph Smith reading James 1:5 as described in the 1838 account of the First Vision

In 1838, Smith began dictating a history, introduced as "I have been induced to write this history ... in relation both to myself and the Church." This history included a new account of the First Vision, later published in three issues of Times and Seasons. This version was later incorporated into the Pearl of Great Price, which was canonized by the LDS Church in 1880, as Joseph Smith–History. Thus, it is often called the "canonized version" of the First Vision story.

This version differs from the 1840 version because it includes the proclamation, "This is My Beloved Son, hear Him" from one of the personages, whereas the 1840 version does not. The canonized version says that in the spring of 1820, during a period of "confusion and strife among the different denominations" following an "unusual excitement on the subject of religion", Smith had debated which of the various Christian groups he should join. While in turmoil, he read from the Epistle of James: "If any of you lack wisdom, let him ask of God, that giveth to all men liberally, and upbraideth not; and it shall be given him."

One morning, deeply impressed by this scripture, the fourteen-year-old Smith went to the woods near his home, knelt, and began his first vocal prayer. Almost immediately he was confronted by an evil power that prevented speech. A darkness gathered around him, and Smith believed that he would be destroyed. He continued the prayer silently, asking for God's assistance though still resigned to destruction. At this moment a light brighter than the sun descended towards him, and he was delivered from the evil power.

In the light, Smith "saw two personages standing in the air". One pointed to the other and said, "This is My Beloved Son, hear Him." Smith asked which religious sect he should join and was told to join none of them because all existing religions had corrupted the teachings of Jesus Christ.

In his 1838 account, Smith wrote that he made an oblique reference to the vision to his mother in 1820, telling her the day it happened that he had "learned for [him]self that Presbyterianism is not true." Lucy did not mention this conversation in her memoirs in her own words, but included the narrative from Joseph's 1838 account directly.

Smith wrote he "could find none that would believe" his experience. He said that shortly after the experience, he told the story of his revelation to a Methodist minister who responded "with great contempt, saying it was all of the devil, that there was no such thing as visions or revelations in these days; that all such things had ceased with the apostles, and that there never would be any more of them." He also said that the telling of his vision story "excited a great deal of prejudice against me among professors of religion, and was the cause of great persecution, which continued to increase." There is no extant evidence from the 1830s for this persecution beyond Smith's own testimony. None of the earliest anti-Mormon literature mentioned the First Vision. Smith also said he told others about the vision during the 1820s, and some family members said that they had heard him mention it, but none prior to 1823, when Smith said he had his second vision. Joseph's mother recorded the 1820-23 persecution of Joseph in her memoir, stating "From this time until the 21st of Sep. 1823, Joseph continued as usual to labor with his father; and nothing during this interval occurred of very great importance; though he suffered, as one would naturally suppose every kind of opposition and persecution from the different orders of religion."

=== 1840 Pratt account ===
In September 1840, Orson Pratt published a version of the First Vision in England. This version states that after Smith saw the light, "his mind was caught away, from the natural objects with which he was surrounded; and he was enwrapped in a heavenly vision." Pratt's account referred to "two glorious personages who exactly resembled each other in their features or likeness".

=== 1842 Wentworth Letter ===
In 1842, two years before his death, Smith wrote to John Wentworth, editor of the Chicago Democrat, outlining the basic beliefs of his church and including an account of the First Vision. Smith said that he had been "about fourteen years of age" when he had received the First Vision. Like the Pratt account, Smith's Wentworth letter said that his "mind was taken away from the objects with which I was surrounded, and I was enwrapped in a heavenly vision." and had seen "two glorious personages who exactly resembled each other in features, and likeness, surrounded with a brilliant light which eclipsed the sun at noon-day." Smith said he was told that no religious denomination "was acknowledged of God as his church and kingdom" and that he was "expressly commanded to 'go not after them.'"

=== Smith's accounts found in later reminiscences ===
In the rough draft of her autobiography, Smith's mother, Lucy Mack Smith, describes her son being visited in 1823 by an angel, who told him "...there is not a true church on the Earth," but does not include a First Vision narrative. The fair copy of the autobiography, prepared under Lucy's direction by the scribe who had also penned the rough draft, includes in the narrative a copy of the 1838 version of the First Vision from Times and Seasons.

Late in his life, Smith's brother William gave two accounts of the First Vision, dating it to 1823, when William was twelve years old. William said the religious excitement in Palmyra had occurred in 1822–23 (rather than the actual date of 1824–25); that it was stimulated by the preaching of a Methodist, the Rev. George Lane, a "great revival preacher"; and that his mother and some of his siblings had then joined the Presbyterian church.

William Smith said he based his account on what Joseph had told William and the rest of his family the day after the First Vision:

[A] light appeared in the heavens, and descended until it rested upon the trees where he was. It appeared like fire. But to his great astonishment, did not burn the trees. An angel then appeared to him and conversed with him upon many things. He told him that none of the sects were right; but that if he was faithful in keeping the commandments he should receive, the true way should be made known to him; that his sins were forgiven, etc.

In an 1884 account, William also stated that when Joseph first saw the light above the trees in the grove, he fell unconscious for an undetermined amount of time, after which he awoke and heard "the personage whom he saw" speak to him.

=== Other accounts of the vision ===
This is an incomplete list of various accounts of the first vision.

==== Secondhand accounts ====
Nature	Year	Author	Other Information
Missionary Tract (German)	1842	Orson Hyde	Orson Hyde of the Quorum of the Twelve Apostles published this account of Smith’s early visions in Frankfurt, Germany, in 1842. Relying heavily on the 1840 Pratt account, Hyde composed the text in English and translated it into German for publication. He called it 'Ein Ruf aus der Wüste' meaning 'A Cry out of the Wilderness'.
Journal extract	1843	Levi Richards	Having attended a meeting where Smith spoke, Richards recorded a testimony born by Joseph Smith regarding the events and the truthfulness of the first vision.
Joseph Smith Jr. Interview	1843	David Nye White	White, editor of the Pittsburgh Weekly Gazette, interviewed Smith in his home as part of a two-day stop in Nauvoo, Illinois.
Journal extract	1844	Alexander Neibaur	A close associate of Smith, Neibaur recorded this very detailed account presumably after a recitation of his vision in a casual environment.

==== Reminicences and Records of other early Latter-Day Saints ====
Nature	Year	Author	Other Information
Book	1855	Brigham Young	In the Journal of Discourses Vol. 2 on page 171, Young refers to the first vision as a catalyst for the restoration.
Discourse	1890	Wilford Woodruff	Recorded in the Latter-Day Saints Millennial Star Woodruff quotes the 1838 Smith account and reiterates the uniqueness and the value of the first vision

== Comparison of written accounts ==
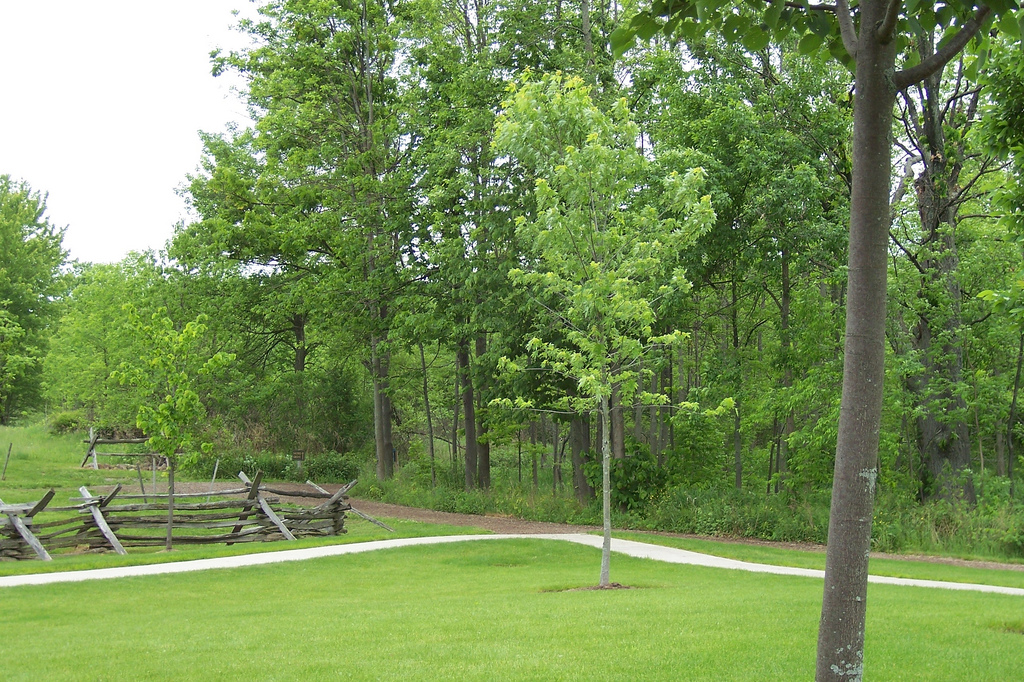
Entrance to the Sacred Grove—property owned by the LDS Church—is open to visitors.

In the first written accounts of the First Vision, the central theme is personal forgiveness, while in later accounts the focus shifts to the apostasy and corruption of churches. In early accounts, Smith seems reluctant to talk about the vision; in later versions, various details are mentioned that were not mentioned in the earliest narratives.

Jerald and Sandra Tanner cite the multiple versions of the First Vision as evidence that it may have been fabricated by Smith. For instance, they have specifically pointed out that it is unclear between various versions whether Smith was 14 or 15 at the time of the vision; whether he attended a contemporaneous religious revival; whether the supernatural personages told Smith that his sins were forgiven; whether the personages were angels, Jesus, God, or some combination; and whether Smith had already determined for himself that all churches were false before he experienced the vision. However, Stephen Prothero argues that any historian should expect to find differences in narratives written many years apart, and that the key elements are present in all the accounts.

Some believers view differences in the accounts as overstated. Richard L. Anderson wrote, "What are the main problems of interpreting so many accounts? The first problem is the interpreter. One person perceives harmony and interconnections while another overstates differences." Other believers view the differences in the accounts as reflective of Smith's increase in maturity and knowledge over time.

The following table compares elements of First Vision accounts:

Source of First Vision	Supernatural beings	Messages from beings	Notes
1832 Joseph Smith's own handwriting from his Letterbook	"The Lord"	"Thy sins are forgiven thee"; the "world lieth in sin" and has "turned aside from the gospel"; and a brief apocalyptic note.	Only account in Joseph Smith's handwriting. Frederick G. Williams edited Joseph's account to take place in his "16th year" (i.e. when he is 15 years old). All other accounts state his age as 14.
1835, Nov. 9, 14 - Joseph Smith diary (Ohio Journal, handwritten, Warren Parrish scribe)	Two personages, and "many angels"	"Thy sins are forgiven thee" and Jesus is the "son of God"	No mention of revivals or corrupt churches.
1838/1839 - History of the Church, Early Draft (James Mulholland Scribe)	Two personages appear, and one says "This is my beloved Son, hear him".	The personages tell Smith that all churches are corrupt.	No mention of "sins forgiven". A revival is mentioned. First edited and published in 15 March, 1 April 1842 Times and Seasons, later incorporated into History of the Church, and later into the Pearl of Great Price as Joseph Smith–History and thus is sometimes referred to as the "canonized version".
1842, March 1 - Times and Seasons, as part of the Wentworth letter	Two personages appear, and one says "This is my beloved Son, hear him".	The personages tell Smith that all churches are corrupt.	No mention of "sins forgiven". A revival is mentioned.
1843, July - Letter from Joseph Smith to D. Rupp	Two personages appear. No mention of "this is my son".	The personages tell Smith that all churches are corrupt.	No mention of "sins forgiven". No revival mentioned. Available online here. See also the Wentworth letter.
1843, Aug 29 - Interview with journalist David White	Two personages appear. "Behold my beloved son, hear him".	The personages tell Smith that all churches are corrupt.	Revival is mentioned. No mention of "sins forgiven".

Accounts of others:

Source of First Vision	Supernatural beings	Messages from beings	Notes
1834: Cowdery Account	An angel appears to Joseph in his bedroom.	Angel grants forgiveness of his sins.	Remainder of the story roughly parallels Smith's later description of a visit by an angel in 1823 who told him about the golden plates.
1840, September - Interesting Account of Several Remarkable Visions , Orson Pratt,	Two "glorious personages, who exactly resembled each other in their features".	"his sins were forgiven". The personages tell Smith that all churches are corrupt.	This is the first published version. No mention of revival. Online here.
1841, June - A Cry from the Wilderness , Orson Hyde	Two "glorious personages" who resembled "each other in their features".	No specific message.	No mention of "sins forgiven" or revival. Smith determines for himself that all churches are corrupt.
1844, May 24 - as told to Alexander Neibaur	Two personages appear. One has a "light complexion" and "blue eyes". "This is my beloved son harken ye him".	Methodist churches are wrong. All churches are corrupt.	Revival is mentioned. No mention of "sins forgiven".
1845 - Lucy Mack Smith, History, 1844–1845, draft copy	An angel visited Joseph in 1823	"...there is not a true church on the Earth."	The fair copy prepared under Lucy's direction by her scribe includes in the narrative a copy of the 1838 version of the first vision as found in the Times and Seasons.

== Interpretations and responses to the vision ==
Smith said that he was persecuted by local "professors of religion" after sharing his story. Historian D. Michael Quinn noted that at the time, the Smith family practiced various Cunning Folk traditions that were criticized by leaders of organized religion, and that Smith's vision may have given Smith confidence to ignore those leaders and continue being an active participant in the Cunning Folk culture.

Among contemporary denominations of the Latter Day Saint movement, the First Vision is typically viewed as a significant (often the most significant) event in the latter day restoration of the Church of Christ. However, the faiths differ in their teachings about the vision's precise meaning and details. Secular scholars and non-Mormons view the vision as a deliberate deception, false memory, delusion, or hallucination, or some combination of these.

=== The Godhead in Latter Day Saint theology ===
The first vision is often used to illustrate various LDS doctrines about the attributes of God and the nature of the Godhead. The LDS Church teaches that the vision shows that the members of the Godhead are three separate beings.

In academia it is assumed that differences in Smith's first vision accounts reflect an evolving concept of the Godhead. For example, references to God in the early writings by Smith, including the Book of Mormon, can be seen as more Trinitarian or modalistic, where God is a single entity, but manifests himself in different modes, sometimes as the Father, sometimes as the Son, but always as an expression of the same one God. Modalism was common in upstate New York at the time, so the appearance of a single personage (Jesus) in Smith's 1832 account would be consistent with prevailing modalistic thought.

Smith's early revelations and writings frequently referred to the Father and the Son being one, but after May 1833, he never again referred to God the Father and Jesus as being one. In 1835, the Lectures on Faith were published as part of the Doctrine and Covenants, teaching a form of Binitarianism where the Father is a "personage of the spirit" and the Son is a "personage of tabernacle" looking exactly the same in appearance, with the Holy Ghost being the shared mind between them. Joseph Smith's later accounts of the First Vision reflects the theology of the Lectures on Faith, for example, the 1835 account notes that "a personage appeared in the midst of this pillar of flame, ... Another personage soon appeared, like unto the first." By the 1840s Smith was teaching a form of social trinitarianism—that members of the Godhead were separate and distinct individuals united in purpose.

LDS Church scholars generally do not accept the view that the early Latter Day Saints were modalists or binitarian. Smith himself also rejected criticism that his views of God had changed, saying "I have always declared God to be a distinct personage, Jesus Christ a separate and distinct personage from God the Father, and that the Holy Ghost was a distinct personage and a Spirit: and these three constitute three distinct personages and three Gods."

=== Early awareness by Latter Day Saints ===
The importance of the First Vision within the Latter Day Saint movement evolved over time. Early adherents were unaware of the details of the vision until 1840, when the earliest accounts were published in Great Britain. An account of the First Vision was not published in the United States until 1842, shortly before Smith's death. Jan Shipps has written that the vision was "practically unknown" until an account of it was published in 1842. LDS historian Richard Bushman wrote, "At first, Joseph was reluctant to talk about his vision. Most early converts probably never heard about the 1820 vision."

=== Interpretation and use by the LDS Church ===
According to the LDS Church, the vision teaches that God the Father and Jesus Christ are separate beings with glorified bodies of flesh and bone; that mankind was literally created in the image of God; that Satan is real but God infinitely greater; that God hears and answers prayer; that no other contemporary church had the fullness of Christ's gospel; and that revelation has not ceased. In the 21st century, the vision features prominently in the Church's program of proselytism.

An official website of the LDS Church calls the First Vision "the greatest event in world history since the birth, ministry, and resurrection of Jesus Christ." In 1998, church president Gordon B. Hinckley declared,

Our entire case as members of The Church of Jesus Christ of Latter-day Saints rests on the validity of this glorious First Vision. It was the parting of the curtain to open this, the dispensation of the fullness of times. Nothing on which we base our doctrine, nothing we teach, nothing we live by is of greater importance than this initial declaration. I submit that if Joseph Smith talked with God the Father and His Beloved Son, then all else of which he spoke is true. This is the hinge on which turns the gate that leads to the path of salvation and eternal life.

In 1961, Hinckley had gone further: "Either Joseph Smith talked with the Father and the Son or he did not. If he did not, we are engaged in a blasphemy." Likewise, in a January 2007 interview conducted for the PBS documentary The Mormons, Hinckley said of the First Vision, "it's either true or false. If it's false, we're engaged in a great fraud. If it's true, it's the most important thing in the world .... That's our claim. That's where we stand, and that's where we fall, if we fall. But we don't. We just stand secure in that faith."

A 2012 Pew Research survey of self-identified members of the LDS Church asked how important believing that Joseph Smith saw God the Father and Jesus Christ was to being a "good Mormon." 80% responded that it was essential, 13% responded that it was important but not essential, and 6% responded that it was either not too, or not at all essential.

==== Historical usage ====
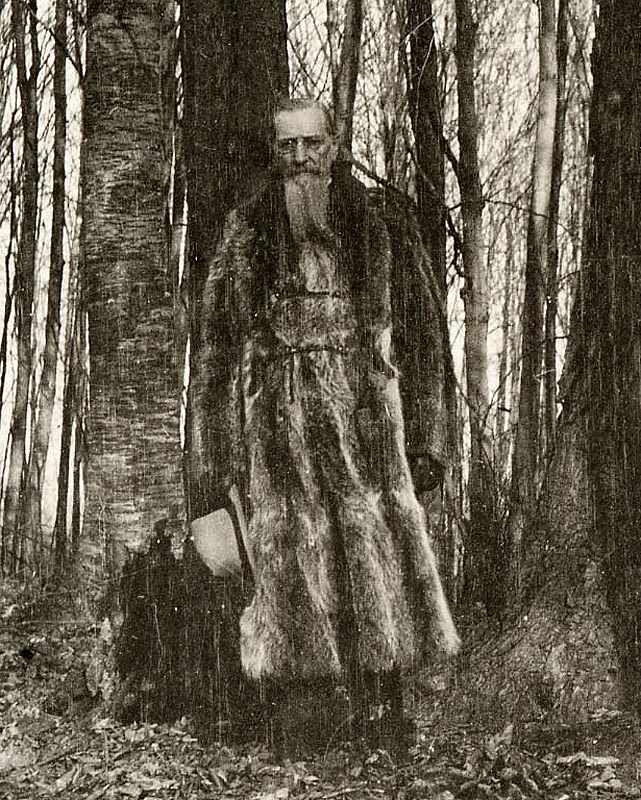
LDS President Joseph F. Smith in the Sacred Grove in 1905, helping to establish the First Vision as a defining element of the theology of the LDS Church

The canonical First Vision story was not emphasized in the sermons of Smith's immediate successors, Brigham Young and John Taylor, within the LDS Church. Hugh Nibley noted that although a "favorite theme of Brigham Young's was the tangible, personal nature of God," he "never illustrates [the theme] by any mention of the first vision." This is not to say that Young did not teach about the First Vision, since he clearly did on multiple occasions.

Taylor gave a complete account of the First Vision story in an 1850 letter written as he began missionary work in France, and he may have alluded to it in a discourse given in 1859. Throughout the late 1870s and 1880s, Taylor made multiple, explicit references to the First Vision in his sermons, books and letters. These included his 1886 letter to his family, one of his last major theological pronouncements in which he stated "God revealed Himself, as also the Lord Jesus Christ, unto his servant the Prophet Joseph Smith".

Three non-Mormon students of Mormonism, Douglas Davies, Kurt Widmer, and Jan Shipps, agree that the church's emphasis on the First Vision was a "'late development', only gaining an influential status in LDS reflection late in the nineteenth century." The first important visual representation of the First Vision was painted by the Danish convert C. C. A. Christensen sometime between 1869 and 1878; George Manwaring, inspired by the artist, wrote a hymn about the First Vision ("Oh, How Lovely Was the Morning", later renamed "Joseph Smith's First Prayer"), first published in 1884.

Widmer states that it was primarily through "the post 1883 sermons of Latter-day Saint Apostle George Q. Cannon that the modern interpretation and significance of the First Vision in Mormonism began to take shape." As the sympathetic but non-Mormon historian Jan Shipps has written, "When the first generation of leadership died off, leaving the community to be guided mainly by men who had not known Joseph, the First Vision emerged as a symbol that could keep the slain Mormon leader at center stage." The centennial anniversary of the vision in 1920 "was a far cry from the almost total lack of reference to it just fifty years before." By 1939, even George D. Pyper, the Church's Sunday School superintendent and manager of the Mormon Tabernacle Choir, found it "surprising that none of the first song writers wrote intimately of the first vision."

Church president Joseph F. Smith helped raise the First Vision to its modern status as a pillar of church theology. Largely through Joseph F. Smith's influence, Smith's 1838 account of the First Vision became part of the canon of the church in 1880 when the faith canonized Smith's early history as part of the Pearl of Great Price. After plural marriage ended at the turn of the 20th century, Joseph F. Smith heavily promoted the First Vision, and it soon replaced polygamy in the minds of adherents as the main defining element of Mormonism and the source of the faith's perception of persecution by outsiders. From 1905 to 1912, the story of the First Vision began to be incorporated into church histories, missionary tracts, and Sunday school lesson manuals. As a result, belief in the First Vision is now considered fundamental to the faith, second in importance only to belief in the divinity of Jesus.

In 1920, the LDS Church held a commemoration in the Sacred Grove to celebrate the 100th anniversary of the First Vision. At the 200th anniversary in 2020, a video recording of church president Russell M. Nelson reading "The Restoration of the Fulness of the Gospel of Jesus Christ: A Bicentennial Proclamation to the World" in the grove was released at the church's general conference.

=== Perspectives within the Community of Christ ===
The Community of Christ generally refers to the First Vision as the "grove experience" and takes a flexible view about its historicity, emphasizing "the healing presence of God and the forgiving mercy of Christ" felt by Joseph Smith. The modern church is Trinitarian, and in contrast to the LDS Church, does not use the First Vision as evidence for the Godhead being three separate beings.

William Smith, a younger brother of Smith, and a key figure in the early Reorganized Church of Jesus Christ of Latter Day Saints (RLDS Church, renamed the Community of Christ in 2001), gave several accounts of the First Vision, although in 1883 he stated that a "more elaborate and accurate description of his vision" was to be found in Smith's own history.

The RLDS Church did not emphasize the First Vision during the 19th century. In the early-20th century, there was a revival of interest, and during most of the century, the First Vision was viewed as an essential element of the Restoration. In many cases, it was taught as the foundation and even the embodiment of the Restoration. The vision was also interpreted as a justification for the exclusive authority of the RLDS Church as the Church of Christ.

In the mid- to late-20th century, writers within the RLDS Church emphasized the First Vision as an illustration of the centrality of Jesus. The church began taking a broader view of the vision, and used it as an example of how God evolves the church over time through revelation and restoration. There was less emphasis on the Great Apostasy and a growing belief that the First Vision itself was not necessarily identical with Smith's later reconstructions and interpretations of the vision, what one RLDS Church Historian has called "genuine historical sophistication." In 1980, this Church Historian noted that he had "systematically brought to the attention" of hundreds of church members "the substantive differences in half a dozen accounts of the First Vision" and expressed his satisfaction that RLDS scholars, "deeply moved and augmented by the presence of the wondrously diverse and conflicting accounts of the First Vision," could "begin the exciting work of developing a mythology of Latter Day Saint beginnings."

=== View of The Church of Jesus Christ (Bickertonite) ===
The Church of Jesus Christ (Bickertonite), a Rigdonite branch with 15,000 members headquartered in Pennsylvania, has had an independent history since the 1844 succession crisis. The church refers to the vision obliquely in a lengthy excerpt from Smith's 1842 account included in its official literature, in which the date "1820" and "a personage" (singular, not plural) are mentioned in paraphrases.

=== Church of Christ (Temple Lot) ===
The Church of Christ (Temple Lot), a branch with 7,000 adherents, rejects many of Smith's post-1832 revelations. Nevertheless, the church uses several elements of the 1842 account of the First Vision, including Smith's desire to know which church he should join, his reading of James 1:5, his prayer in the grove, the appearance of God the Father and Jesus Christ, the statement by Jesus that all existing churches were corrupt, and the instruction that Smith should join none of them.

=== Criticism and response ===
Writing of the "unusual excitement on the subject of religion" described in the First Vision story canonized by the LDS Church, Milton V. Backman said that although "the tools of the historian" could neither verify nor challenge the First Vision, "records of the past can be examined to determine the reliability of Joseph's description regarding the historical setting." Grant Palmer and other critics claim that there are serious discrepancies between the various accounts, as well as anachronisms revealed by lack of contemporary corroboration. Other critics, like Fawn Brodie and Jerald and Sandra Tanner, argue that the Smith's accounts are not unique and not much different from similar visions and accounts being reported by others, such as Elias Smith and Asa Wild, around the same time.

Leaders of the LDS Church have acknowledged that the First Vision as well as the Book of Mormon and Smith himself constitute "stumbling blocks for many." Apostle Neal A. Maxwell wrote:

In our own time, Joseph Smith, the First Vision, and the Book of Mormon constitute stumbling blocks for many—around which they cannot get—unless they are meek enough to examine all the evidence at hand, not being exclusionary as a result of accumulated attitudes in a secular society. Humbleness of mind is the initiator of expansiveness of mind.

In a 2007 PBS documentary, Richard Mouw, an evangelical theologian and student of Mormonism, summarized his feelings about the First Vision:

My instinct is to attribute a sincerity to Joseph Smith. And yet at the same time, as an evangelical Christian, I do not believe that the members of the godhead really appeared to him and told him that he should start on a mission of, among other things, denouncing the kinds of things that I believe as a Presbyterian. I can't believe that. And yet at the same time, I really don't believe that he was simply making up a story that he knew to be false in order to manipulate people and to gain power over a religious movement. And so I live with the mystery.

== Side-by-side comparison of Joseph Smith vision accounts ==
Smith's various statements share commononalities (rendered in green), each mentioning a young Smith praying for guidance and experiencing a vision of a bright light. In the three latest accounts, Smith references a grove or woods, cites the Epistle of James as justification to pray for wisdom, and receives an answer from supernatural "personages".

Other details (rendered in orange) vary across accounts, with him being sixteen in the earliest account and fourteen in some others. In his earliest account which went unpublished until 1965, Smith has already concluded from on his own study that none of the churches are true; but in later accounts, Smith learns none of the churches are true from the supernatual beings. His first account makes no reference to personages, while his second account suggests the personages may merely be angels; But in the later two account, the personages are identified with the Father and the Son: the third account has one personage explicitly identified the other as "My Beloved Son", and the latest account notes the "personages exactly resembled each other in features and likeness".

Summer 1832 History	November 1835 Journal	1838 History	1842 Wentworth Letter
My mind became exceedingly distressed, for I became convicted of my sins, and by searching the scriptures I found that mankind did not come unto the Lord but that they had apostatized from the true and living faith, and there was no society or denomination that was built upon the gospel of Jesus Christ as recorded in the New Testament. I felt to mourn for my own sins and for the sins of the world, for I learned in the scriptures that God was the same yesterday, today, and forever, that he was no respecter of persons, for he was God.	Being wrought up in my mind respecting the subject of religion, and looking at the different systems taught the children of men, I knew not who was right or who was wrong.	My mind at times was greatly excited, the cry and tumult were so great and incessant. The Presbyterians were most decided against the Baptists and Methodists, and used all the powers of both reason and sophistry to prove their errors, or, at least, to make the people think they were in error. On the other hand, the Baptists and Methodists in their turn were equally zealous in endeavoring to establish their own tenets and disprove all others. In the midst of this war of words and tumult of opinions, I often said to myself: What is to be done? Who of all these parties are right; or, are they all wrong together? If any one of them be aright, which is it, and how shall I know it?	When about fourteen years of age, I began to reflect upon the importance of being prepared for a future state, and upon enquiring about the plan of salvation, I found that there was a great clash in religious sentiment; if I went to one society, they referred me to one plan, and another to another, each one pointing to his own particular creed as the summum bonum of perfection. Considering that all could not be right, and that God could not be the author of so much confusion, I determined to investigate the subject more fully, believing that if God had a church it would not be split up into factions, and that if he taught one society to worship one way, and administer in one set of ordinances, he would not teach another principles which were diametrically opposed.
For I looked upon the sun, the glorious luminary of the earth, and also the moon, rolling in their majesty through the heavens, and also the stars shining in their courses, and the earth also upon which I stood, and the beasts of the field, and the fowls of heaven, and the fish of the waters, and also man walking forth upon the face of the earth in majesty and in the strength of beauty, whose power and intelligence in governing the things which are so exceedingly great and marvelous, even in the likeness of him who created them. And when I considered upon these things, my heart exclaimed, "Well hath the wise man said, 'It is a fool that saith in his heart, there is no God.'" My heart exclaimed, "All, all these bear testimony and bespeak an omnipotent and omnipresent power, a being who maketh laws and decreeth and bindeth all things in their bounds, who filleth eternity, who was and is and will be from all eternity to eternity." And I considered all these things and that that being seeketh such to worship him as worship him in spirit and in truth.	And considering it of the first importance that I should be right in matters that involve eternal consequences, being thus perplexed in mind I retired to the silent grove and bowed down before the Lord, under a realizing sense that he had said (if the Bible be true), "Ask, and you shall receive; knock, and it shall be opened; seek, and you shall find," and again, "If any man lack wisdom, let him ask of God, who giveth to all men liberally, and upbraideth not." Information was what I most desired at this time, and with a fixed determination to obtain it,	While I was laboring under the extreme difficulties caused by the contests of these parties of religionists, I was one day reading the Epistle of James, first chapter and fifth verse, which reads: If any of you lack wisdom, let him ask of God, that giveth to all men liberally, and upbraideth not; and it shall be given him. Never did any passage of scripture come with more power to the heart of man than this did at this time to mine. It seemed to enter with great force into every feeling of my heart. I reflected on it again and again, knowing that if any person needed wisdom from God, I did; for how to act I did not know, and unless I could get more wisdom than I then had, I would never know; for the teachers of religion of the different sects understood the same passages of scripture so differently as to destroy all confidence in settling the question by an appeal to the Bible. At length I came to the conclusion that I must either remain in darkness and confusion, or else I must do as James directs, that is, ask of God. I at length came to the determination to "ask of God," concluding that if he gave wisdom to them that lacked wisdom, and would give liberally, and not upbraid, I might venture.	Believing the word of God, I had confidence in the declaration of James; "If any man lack wisdom, let him ask of God, who giveth to all men liberally and upbraideth not, and it shall be given him."
Therefore, I cried unto the Lord for mercy, for there was none else to whom I could go and obtain mercy. And the Lord heard my cry in the wilderness, and while in the attitude of calling upon the Lord, in the sixteenth year of my age,	I called upon the Lord for the first time in the place above stated. Or in other words, I made a fruitless attempt to pray; my tongue seemed to be swollen in my mouth, so that I could not utter. I heard a noise behind me, like some person walking towards me. I strove again to pray but could not. The noise of walking seemed to draw nearer. I sprung up on my feet and looked around but saw no person or thing that was calculated to produce the noise of walking. I kneeled again. My mouth was opened and my tongue liberated, and I called on the Lord in mighty prayer.	So, in accordance with this, my determination to ask of God, I retired to the woods to make the attempt. It was on the morning of a beautiful, clear day, early in the spring of eighteen hundred and twenty. It was the first time in my life that I had made such an attempt, for amidst all my anxieties I had never as yet made the attempt to pray vocally. After I had retired to the place where I had previously designed to go, having looked around me, and finding myself alone, I kneeled down and began to offer up the desires of my heart to God. I had scarcely done so, when immediately I was seized upon by some power which entirely overcame me, and had such an astonishing influence over me as to bind my tongue so that I could not speak. Thick darkness gathered around me, and it seemed to me for a time as if I were doomed to sudden destruction. But, exerting all my powers to call upon God to deliver me out of the power of this enemy which had seized upon me, and at the very moment when I was ready to sink into despair and abandon myself to destruction—not to an imaginary ruin, but to the power of some actual being from the unseen world, who had such marvelous power as I had never before felt in any being—just at this moment of great alarm,	I retired to a secret place in a grove and began to call upon the Lord. While fervently engaged in supplication, my mind was taken away from the objects with which I was surrounded,
a pillar of light above the brightness of the sun at noonday came down from above and rested upon me. I was filled with the spirit of God, and the Lord opened the heavens upon me and I saw the Lord.	A pillar of fire appeared above my head. It presently rested down upon me and filled me with joy unspeakable. A personage appeared in the midst of this pillar of flame, which was spread all around and yet nothing consumed. Another personage soon appeared, like unto the first.	I saw a pillar of light exactly over my head, above the brightness of the sun, which descended gradually until it fell upon me. It no sooner appeared than I found myself delivered from the enemy which held me bound. When the light rested upon me I saw two Personages, whose brightness and glory defy all description, standing above me in the air. One of them spake unto me, calling me by name and said, pointing to the other—This is My Beloved Son. Hear Him!	and I was enwrapped in a heavenly vision and saw two glorious personages who exactly resembled each other in features and likeness, surrounded with a brilliant light which eclipsed the sun at noonday.
And he spake unto me, saying, "Joseph, my son, thy sins are forgiven thee. Go thy way, walk in my statutes, and keep my commandments. Behold, I am the Lord of glory. I was crucified for the world, that all those who believe on my name may have eternal life. Behold, the world lieth in sin at this time, and none doeth good, no, not one. They have turned aside from the gospel and keep not my commandments. They draw near to me with their lips while their hearts are far from me. And mine anger is kindling against the inhabitants of the earth, to visit them according to their ungodliness and to bring to pass that which hath been spoken by the mouth of the prophets and apostles. Behold and lo, I come quickly, as it is written of me, in the cloud, clothed in the glory of my Father."	He said unto me, "Thy sins are forgiven thee." He testified unto me that Jesus Christ is the son of God. And I saw many angels in this vision.	My object in going to inquire of the Lord was to know which of all the sects was right, that I might know which to join. No sooner, therefore, did I get possession of myself, so as to be able to speak, than I asked the Personages who stood above me in the light, which of all the sects was right (for at this time it had never entered into my heart that all were wrong)—and which I should join. I was answered that I must join none of them, for they were all wrong; and the Personage who addressed me said that all their creeds were an abomination in his sight; that those professors were all corrupt; that: "they draw near to me with their lips, but their hearts are far from me, they teach for doctrines the commandments of men, having a form of godliness, but they deny the power thereof." He again forbade me to join with any of them; and many other things did he say unto me, which I cannot write at this time. When I came to myself again, I found myself lying on my back, looking up into heaven.	They told me that all religious denominations were believing in incorrect doctrines and that none of them was acknowledged of God as his church and kingdom. And I was expressly commanded to "go not after them," at the same time receiving a promise that the fulness of the gospel should at some future time be made known unto me.
My soul was filled with love, and for many days I could rejoice with great joy. The Lord was with me, but I could find none that would believe the heavenly vision. Nevertheless, I pondered these things in my heart.	I was about fourteen years old when I received this first communication.	When the light had departed, I had no strength; but soon recovering in some degree, I went home. And as I leaned up to the fireplace, mother inquired what the matter was. I replied, "Never mind, all is well—I am well enough off." I then said to my mother, "I have learned for myself that Presbyterianism is not true." It seems as though the adversary was aware, at a very early period of my life, that I was destined to prove a disturber and an annoyer of his kingdom; else why should the powers of darkness combine against me? Why the opposition and persecution that arose against me, almost in my infancy?	
