= Sacred Grove (Latter Day Saints) =

Forest in New York important to the Latter Day Saint movement

Coordinates: 43.040669°N 77.244404°W

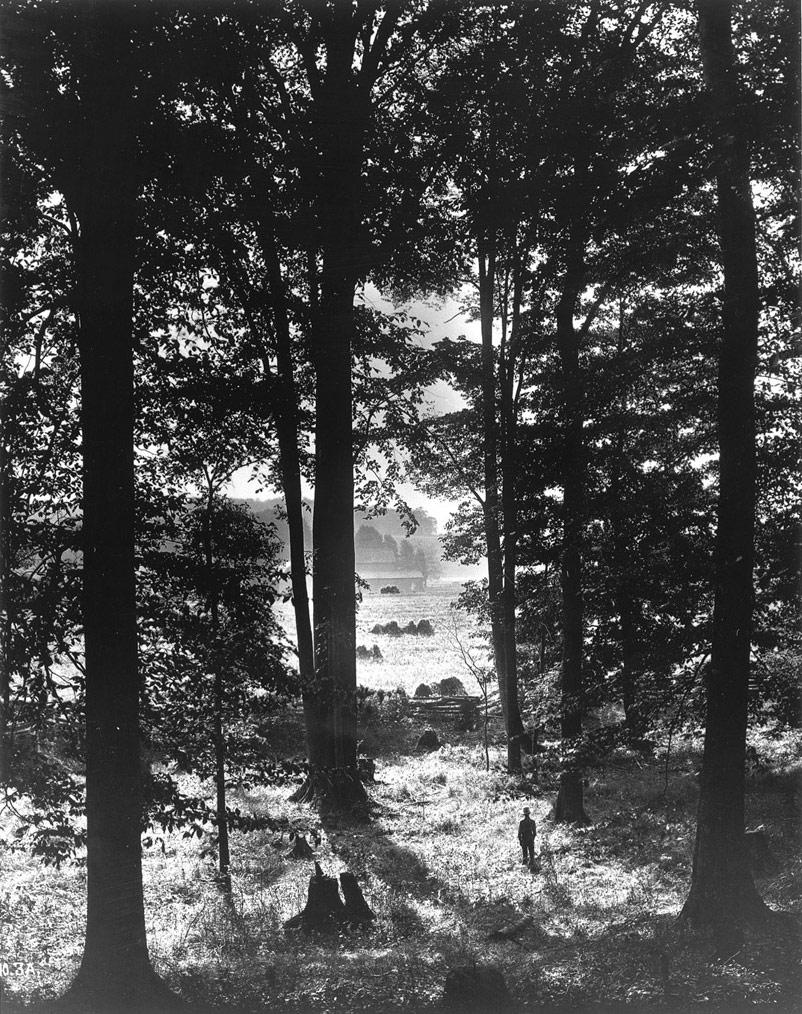
Photograph of the grove by George Edward Anderson, circa 1907

The Sacred Grove is a forested area of western New York near the home of Joseph Smith where the foundational event of the Latter Day Saint movement took place. It is the location where Smith said he had his First Vision, a theophany, occurring in the spring of 1820.

The exact location of the Sacred Grove is not known, but it would likely have been west of Smith's adolescent home on the border of the towns of Palmyra and Manchester. This area was being cleared at the time for farming by the Smith family, who were also using the trees to harvest maple syrup. The area has been purchased by the Church of Jesus Christ of Latter-day Saints (LDS Church), which cares for the area and allows tourists to visit. Latter Day Saints view the place as a sacred site.

The Sacred Grove was ranked the No. 74 Most Holy Place on Earth by religious leaders, writers and scholars in the Patheos multi-faith religion project Sacred Spaces: The 100 Most Holy Places on Earth.

== First Vision ==
The Sacred Grove's historical significance is as the location of Smith's First Vision. In the early 19th century, the western New York area had "caught fire" so many times with intense revivalism that it later became known as the burned-over district. As an early adolescent, the revivalism both interested and confused Smith, and he became concerned "for the wellfare of my immortal Soul," which led him to study the scriptures (Smith 1832, pp. 1–2). Believing that "there was no society or denomination that built upon the gospel of Jesus Christ as recorded in the New Testament" (Smith 1832, p. 2), and not knowing where to turn for forgiveness of his sins, he went to the woods near his home to pray (Smith 1832, p. 3). While praying, Smith said he saw a "pillar of light", and then "his mind was caught away" into a vision (Pratt 1840, p. 5) where two personages, identified as God the Father and Jesus Christ, told him his sins were forgiven and that all churches were false and corrupt (Pratt 1840, p. 5; Smith 1842c, p. 748).

This story has become a foundational element for the LDS Church and other organizations in the Latter Day Saint movement. Adherents believe this vision started Smith on a path toward him becoming a prophet, translating the Book of Mormon from golden plates, and re-establishing the Church of Christ.

== The Eight Witnesses ==
The Sacred Grove is also suggested as a possible site where Smith showed the golden plates to Eight Witnesses in June 1829. Smith's mother, Lucy Mack Smith, said the event took place at a location near the Smith log home "where the [Smith] family were in the habit of offering up their secret devotions to God" (Smith 1853, p. 140). Followers believe the plates had been taken there by the Angel Moroni, who had buried them there after their abridgement 1,400 years earlier. (Smith 1853, p. 140).

== Today ==
The Sacred Grove is often visited as part of the Smith Family Farm, a historical site of the LDS Church, located at 843 Stafford Road. The church operates a welcome center on the farm, which includes a replica of the log home built in 1818 by Smith's father, Joseph, Sr., as well as the original frame home built by the Smiths in 1825.

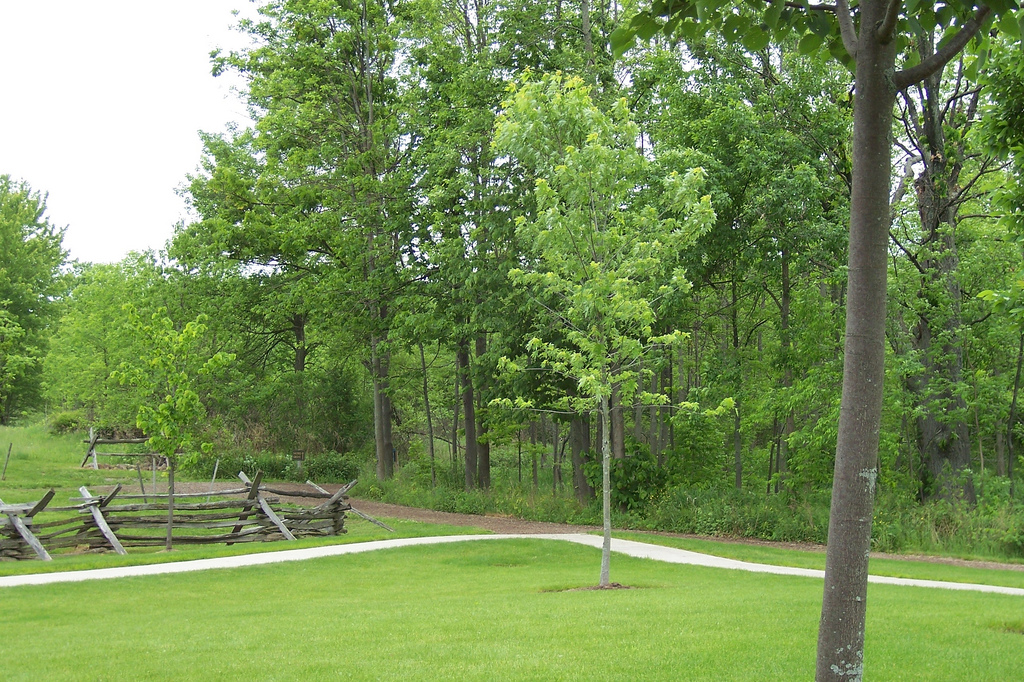
The Sacred Grove—property owned by the LDS Church—is open to visitors.

Visitors to the area are able to walk through the grove on a series of interconnecting dirt trails. The majority of the trees within the Sacred Grove are too young to have been present at the time the Smith family lived there. Bob Parrot, a forestry specialist hired by the church to care for the grove, has identified only six trees in the grove that were alive in 1820; these trees are referred to as the "Witness Trees". The Sacred Grove Conservation Program, which was created after the nearby log home was reconstructed, has been implemented to restore the grove to its 1820 size.

Other historic sites close to the Smith Farm are the Hill Cumorah and its associated visitors' center, near where Smith said he was given the records that he translated the Book of Mormon from, as well as the E. B. Grandin Printing Shop in Palmyra, where the initial printing of the Book of Mormon took place.

== Commemorations ==
In 1920, the LDS Church held a commemoration in the grove to celebrate the 100th anniversary of the First Vision. At the 200th anniversary of the First Vision in 2020, a video recording of Church president Russell M. Nelson reading "The Restoration of the Fulness of the Gospel of Jesus Christ: A Bicentennial Proclamation to the World" in the grove was released at the church's general conference.

== See also ==
- Adam-ondi-Ahman
- Holy of Holies (LDS Church)
- List of historic sites of The Church of Jesus Christ of Latter-day Saints
- Most Holy Place
- Temple (LDS Church)
