= Smith Family Farm =

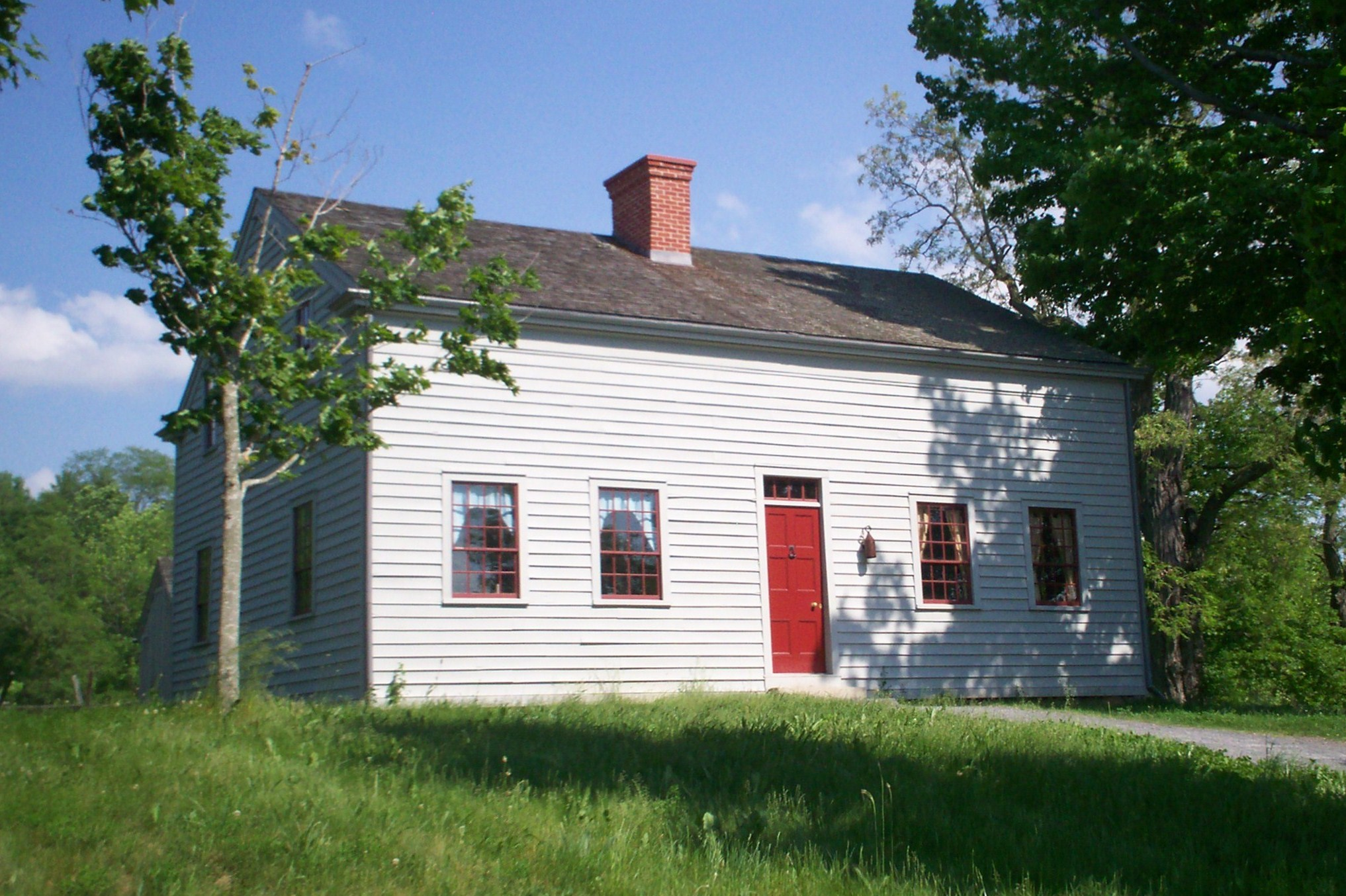
- The Smiths' frame home

- Site location within New York, USA
- 43.038234°N 77.240893°W
- Location: Townships of Palmyra, Wayne County and Manchester, Ontario County, New York, United States

History
- Founded: 1820s

Site notes
- Governing body: The Church of Jesus Christ of Latter-day Saints

The Smith Family Farm was the boyhood home of Joseph Smith, the founder of the Latter Day Saint movement.

The farm—located in the townships of Palmyra, Wayne County and Manchester, Ontario County, New York—includes the Sacred Grove, the Smiths' restored frame home, and a reconstructed log home. The farm site passed into ownership of the Church of Jesus Christ of Latter-day Saints (LDS Church) in 1915, and in the 1990s, the church restored the frame home, reconstructed the log home, and built a welcome center. Church missionaries provide free tours.

== History ==
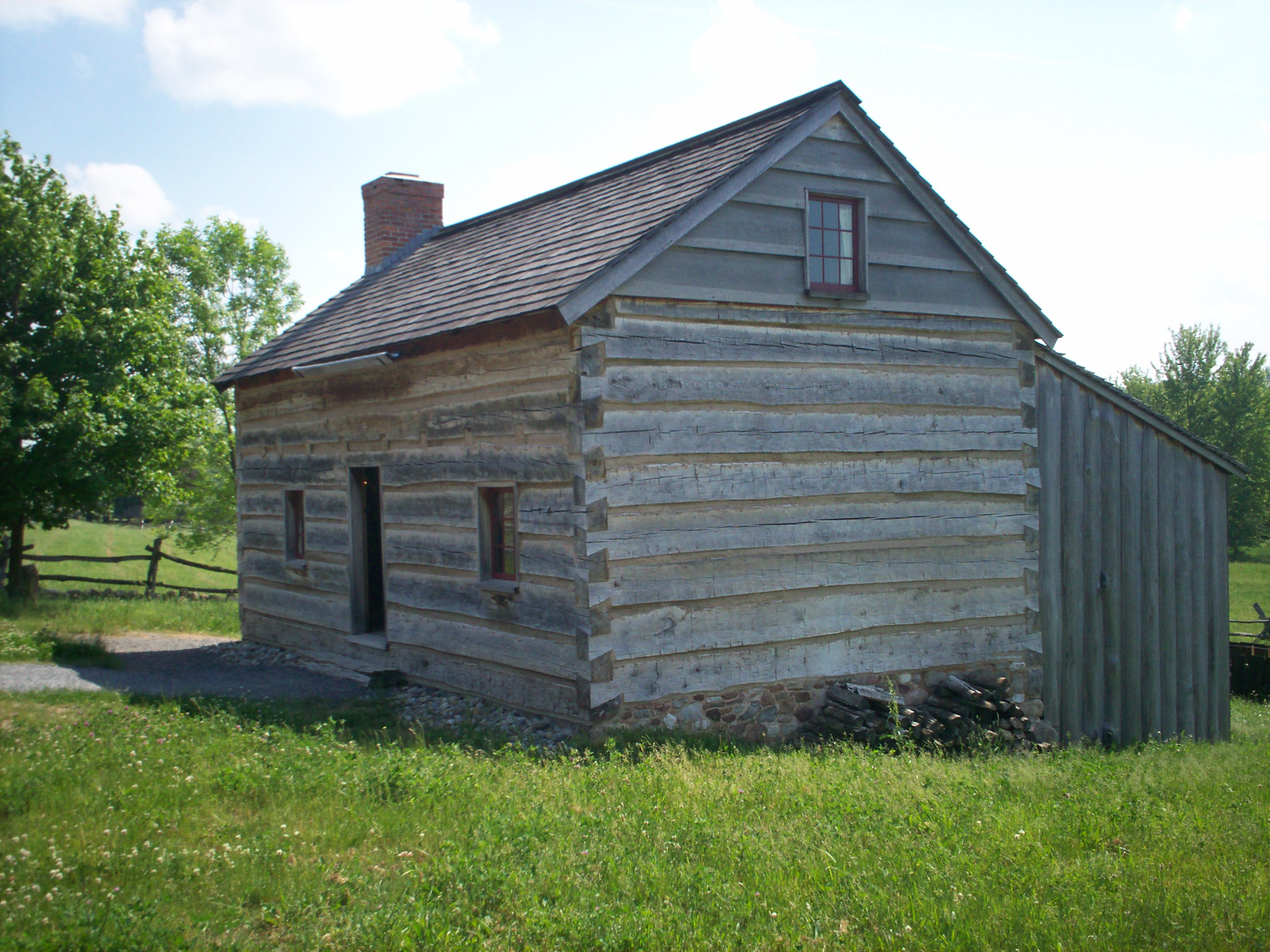
Reconstructed Smith log cabin

Joseph Smith Sr., his wife Lucy Mack Smith, and some of their children moved from Norwich, Vermont, to Palmyra, New York, in 1816. In 1818 or 1819, the family built a log home near property owned by the estate of Nicholas Evertson of New York City, but did not enter a purchase agreement for the land until a land agent had been appointed in 1820. Smith, Sr. agreed to pay the Evertson estate between $600 and 700 for the 100-acre (0.4 km^{2}) farm. In 1825, the family moved into a larger and more comfortable frame home that they had built on the property but were unable to make payments on the land. A carpenter who had completed the house sued the Smiths for his costs in February 1825. A new agent for the Evertson estate also foreclosed on them, although a sympathetic Quaker, Lemuel Durfee, purchased the farm and permitted the family to rent the frame house until they returned to the log home in the spring of 1829. The Smiths left the area in 1830.

The farm was purchased by the LDS Church in 1907 and passed into its care in 1915. The instigator of the purchase was LDS Church president Joseph F. Smith. The grove of trees on the site where Joseph Smith was assumed to have had his First Vision became a pilgrimage site, and centennial celebrations were held there in 1920.
