= Joseph Daniel Bagley =

American businessman, and photographer

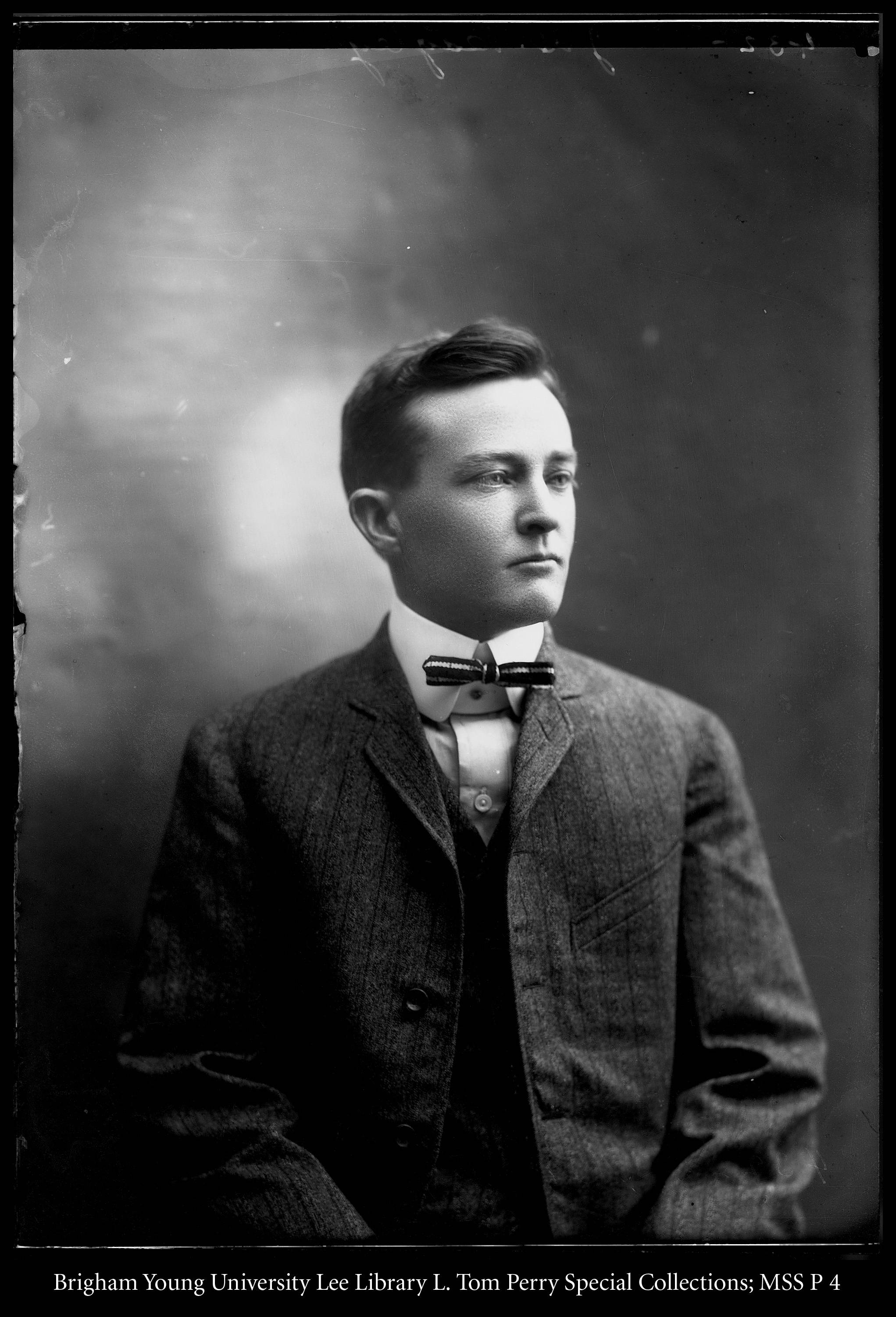
Portrait of Joseph Bagley

Joseph Daniel Bagley (born Joseph Daniel Flannigan; December 17, 1874 – June 16, 1936) was an American beekeeper, businessman, and photographer. He operated an apiary and a photography studio in Springville, Utah. Bagley traveled around Utah, taking photos and setting up galleries.

== Early life ==
Bagley was born on December 17, 1874, to Thomas Emmett Flannigan and Margaret Melissa Bagley in Toquerville, Utah. At a young age, Bagley began to live with his maternal grandparents and took their last name. His grandfather was a beekeeper and taught Bagley the trade.

== Career ==
Bagley operated the Western Bee and Honey Company, which was one of the largest apiaries in the area at the time.

Bagley began working as an apprentice for photographer George Edward Anderson in Springville, Utah. There, Bagley met another apprentice, Elife Caroline Huntington. In 1903, Bagley and Huntington left Anderson's studio and started their own photography studio across the street. When Anderson left to serve a mission for the Church of Jesus Christ of Latter-day Saints in England, Bagley and Huntington expanded their photography business. Their studio was in business for more than 33 years. At the studio, Bagley took portraits, made picture frames, and developed pictures. Bagley and Huntington traveled across Utah on their motorcycle, taking photos of multiple towns and people and setting up galleries. Bagley and Huntington advertised their studio as being willing to "go anywhere, to "photograph everything."

Bagley often worked at the apiary during the summer and at the photography studio during the winter.

=== Photography style ===
One author says that Bagley and Huntington's legacy remains due to their "willingness to confront, starkly at times, the pains and complexities of life." Another author refers to their work as "unusual" for their time. Besides portraits, Bagley and Huntington photographed subjects such as disability, alcohol use, gambling, and loneliness.

== Personal life ==
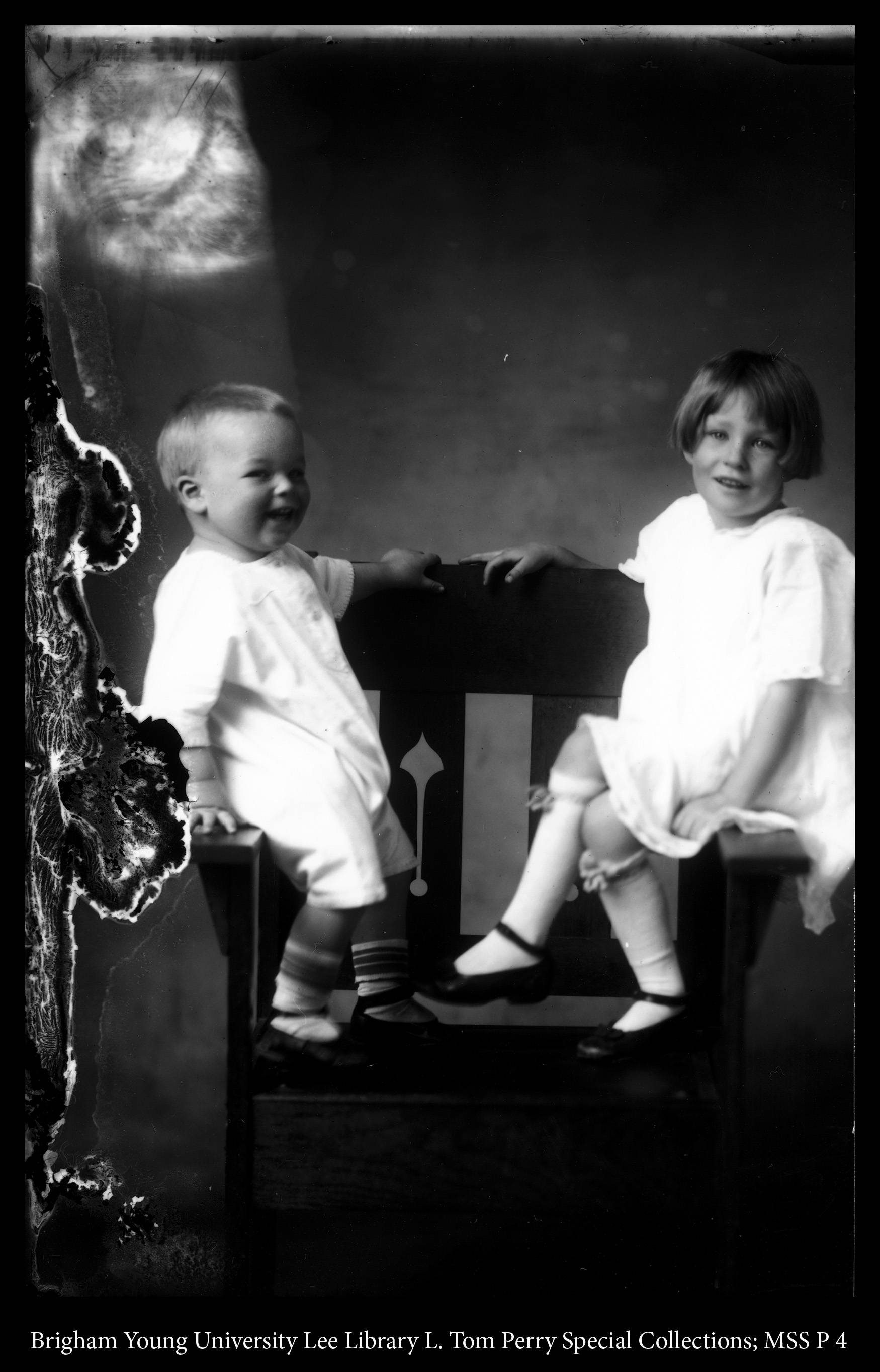
Two of Bagley's children

Bagley married Emma Spafford on June 19, 1907. They had four children, two of which survived to adulthood. Spafford died in 1926 and Bagley began to experience financial and family troubles. He trained his only son, Daniel, in beekeeping and photography. Bagley's daughters often lived with relatives while Daniel lived with his father and helped with the family businesses.

In May 1936, Bagley married Huntington in a simple ceremony in their studio. However, Bagley died six weeks after their marriage on June 16, 1936.

== Collections ==
Bagley's work is held in the permanent collections of the Huntington Bagley Collection and the Rell G. Francis Collection, both housed at Brigham Young University; the Springville Museum of Art, the Mapleton, Utah Historical Photographs collection, and the Domestic Life Photograph Collection of the Utah State Historical Society.

== Selected works from the Huntington- Bagley Collection ==
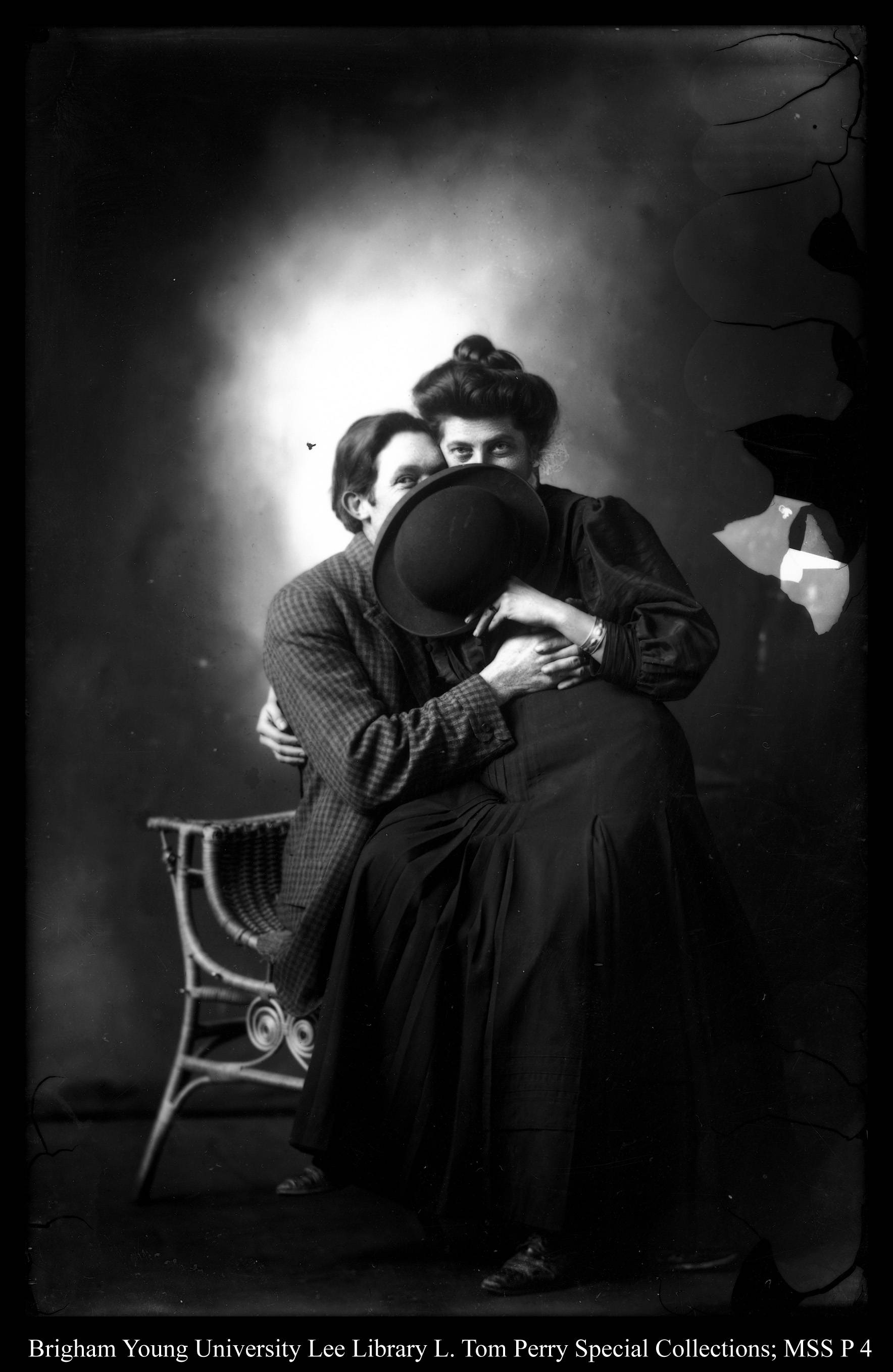

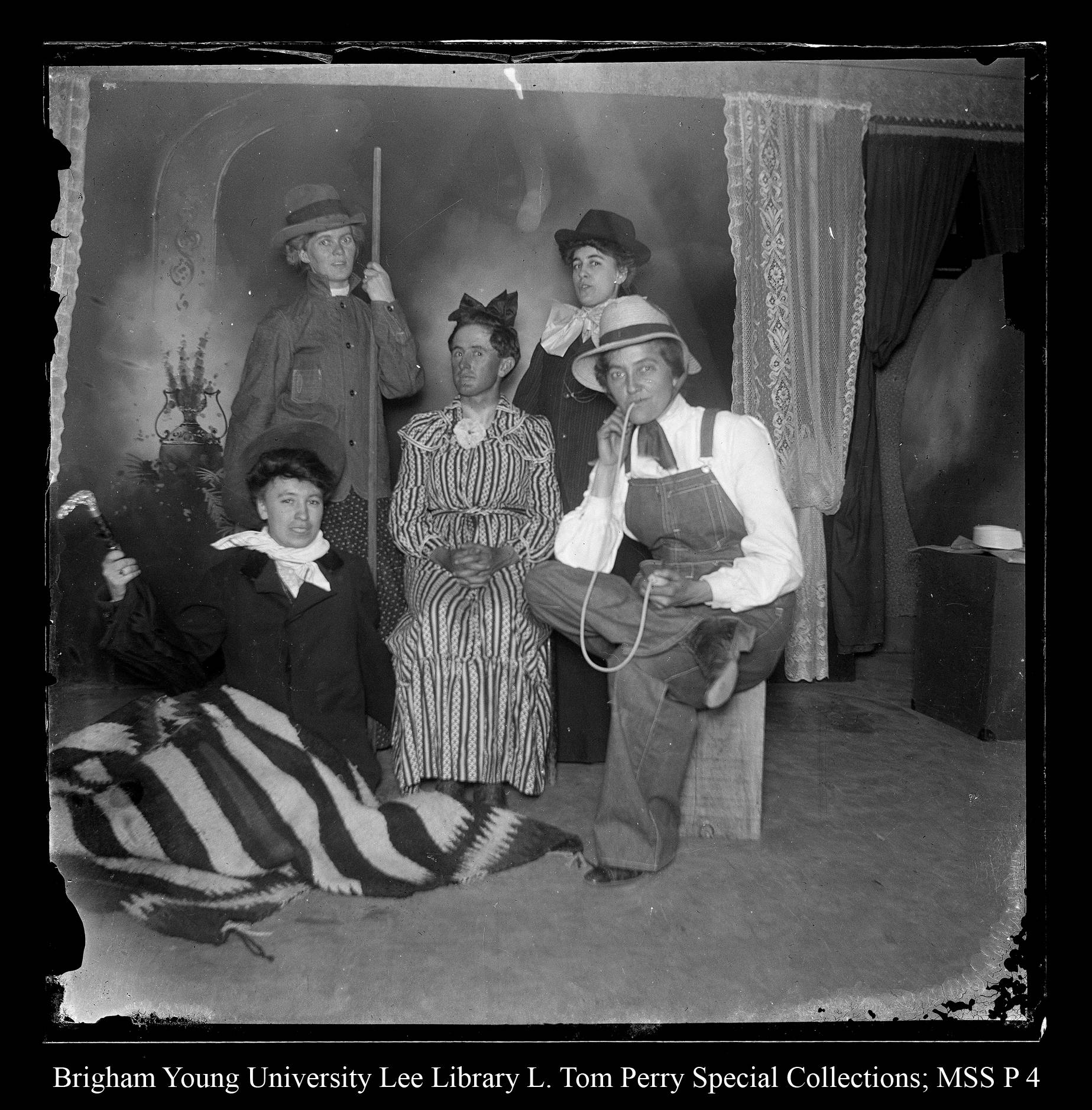

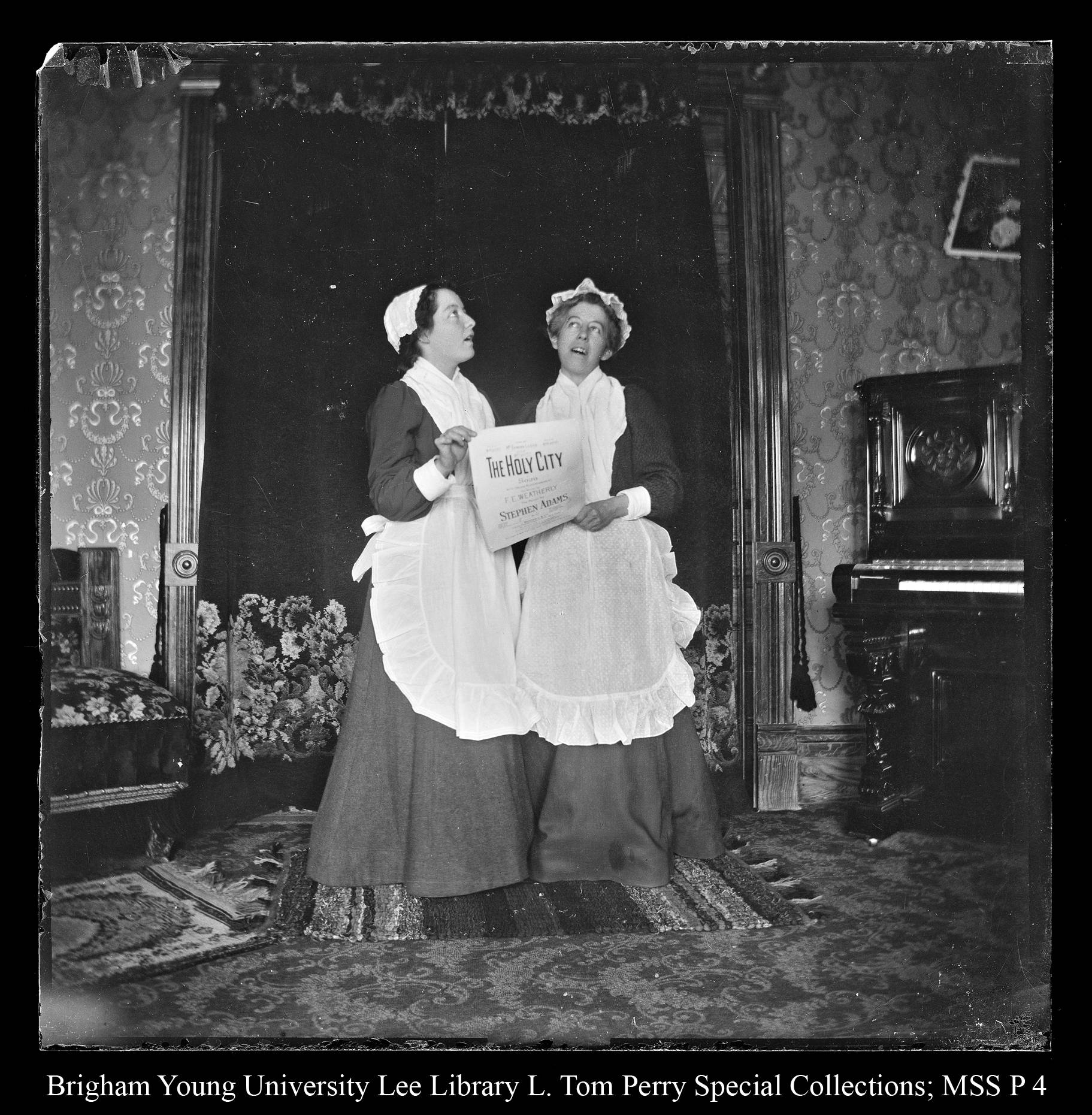

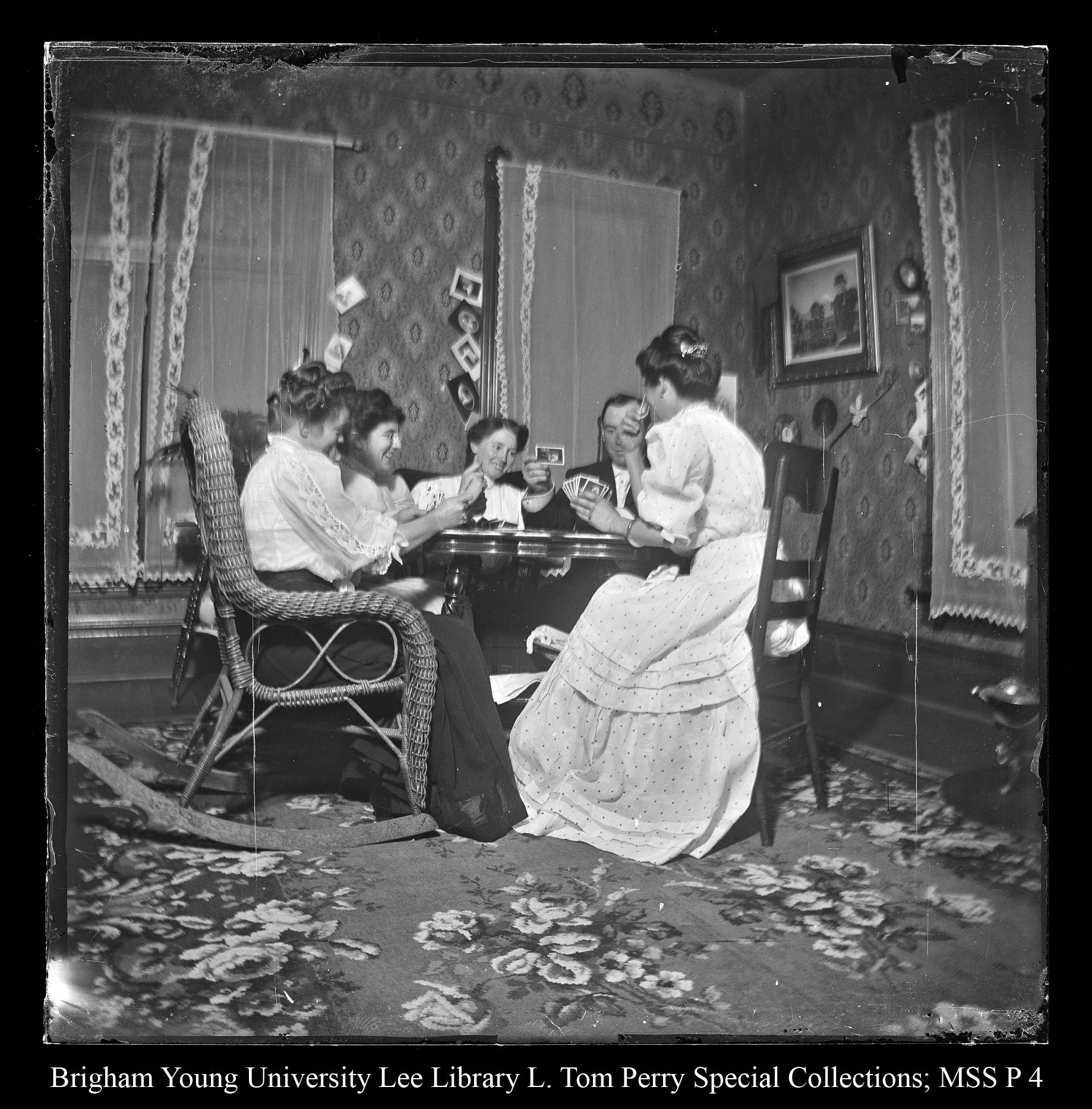

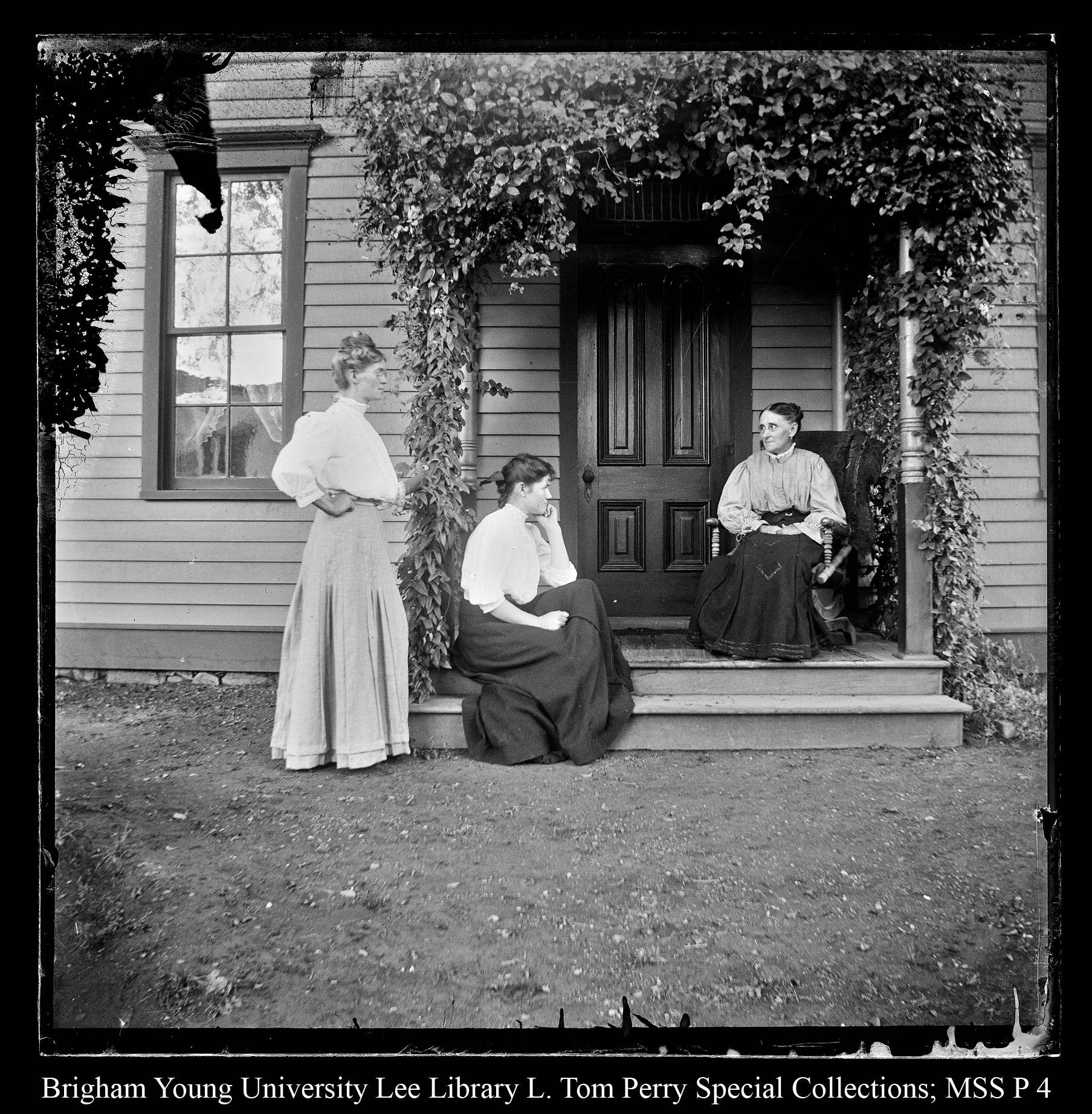

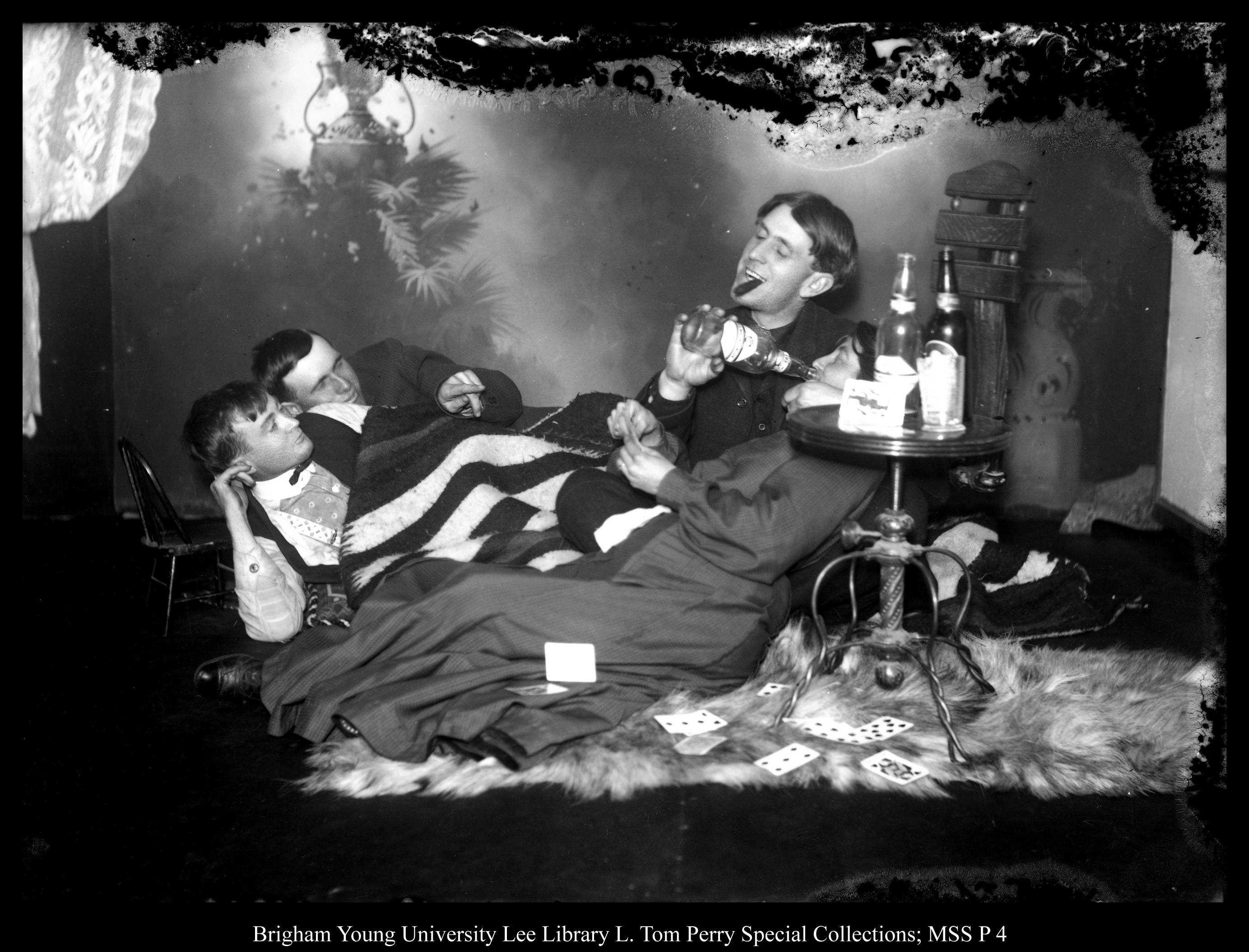
