= Elfie Caroline Huntington =

American photographer (1868–1949)

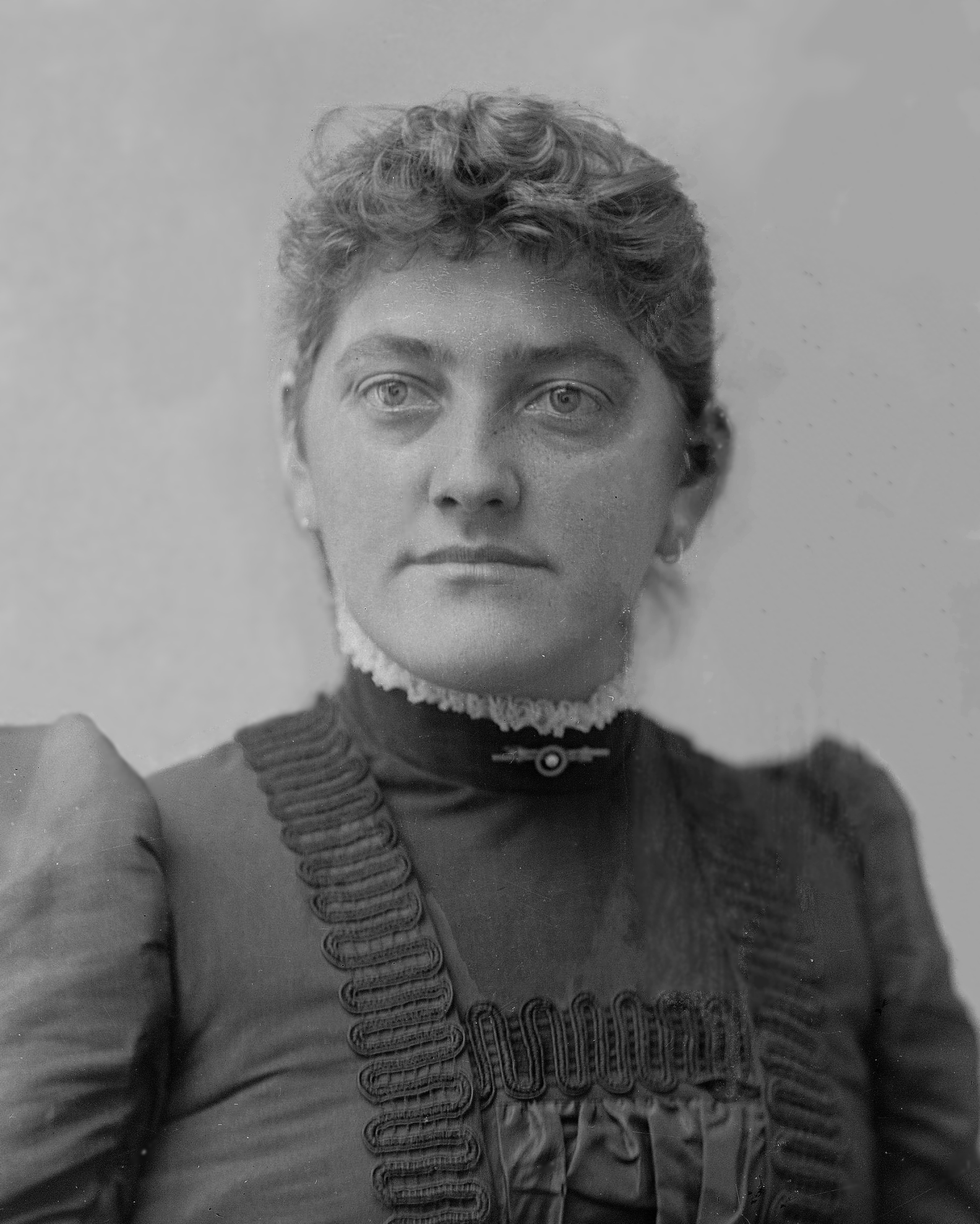
- Huntington in 1927
- Born: December 27, 1868; Springville, Utah Territory, U.S.
- Died: July 24, 1949 (aged 80); Utah, U.S.
- Burial place: Springville City Cemetery
- Known for: Photography
- Spouse: Joseph Daniel Bagley (m. 1936; died 1936)

Elfie Caroline Huntington (December 27, 1868 – July 24, 1949) was an American photographer from Springville, Utah. She was deaf as a result of childhood scarlet fever, and became involved in photography at age 24 as an apprentice to George Edward Anderson. She started a successful photography studio in Springville with fellow apprentice Joseph Daniel Bagley; they also traveled around Utah taking photographs. Huntington was known for taking pictures of everyday occurrences as well as dark, humorous photos.

== Early life ==
Elfie Caroline Huntington was born in 1868 in Springville, Utah Territory to William Clark Huntington and Emma Elizabeth Boyer. When she was four years old, she lost her hearing due to complications from scarlet fever. Since there were few educational opportunities for children with disabilities, she did not perfect her lip-reading or speaking until her late teens. Despite her disability, she never attended a school for the deaf, but became "well educated" in public schools.

Her mother died in childbirth and her father was an Indian agent who eventually remarried and moved to California. She was raised by her grandmother, and after her grandmother's death lived with her aunt and uncle. Her uncle encouraged her to pursue the visual arts.

== Career ==
At age 24, with her uncle's help, Huntington began an apprenticeship with a local photographer, George Edward Anderson. She learned retouching negatives, darkroom techniques, and general photography skills. During her apprenticeship, she became known in Springville for her success.

While working with Anderson, she purchased her first camera and began taking personal pictures of her family, friends, and everyday life in Springville. She stored these printed photos in albums.

In 1903, Huntington and another of Anderson's apprentices, Joseph Daniel Bagley, created their own studio. Their studio, called Huntington and Bagley, offered services such as professional portraits and film finishing. They were in business for over 33 years. Huntington and Bagley also traveled around Utah to take portraits and set up galleries, as well as taking photographs of Native American ruins. They were often seen traveling together on a motorcycle.

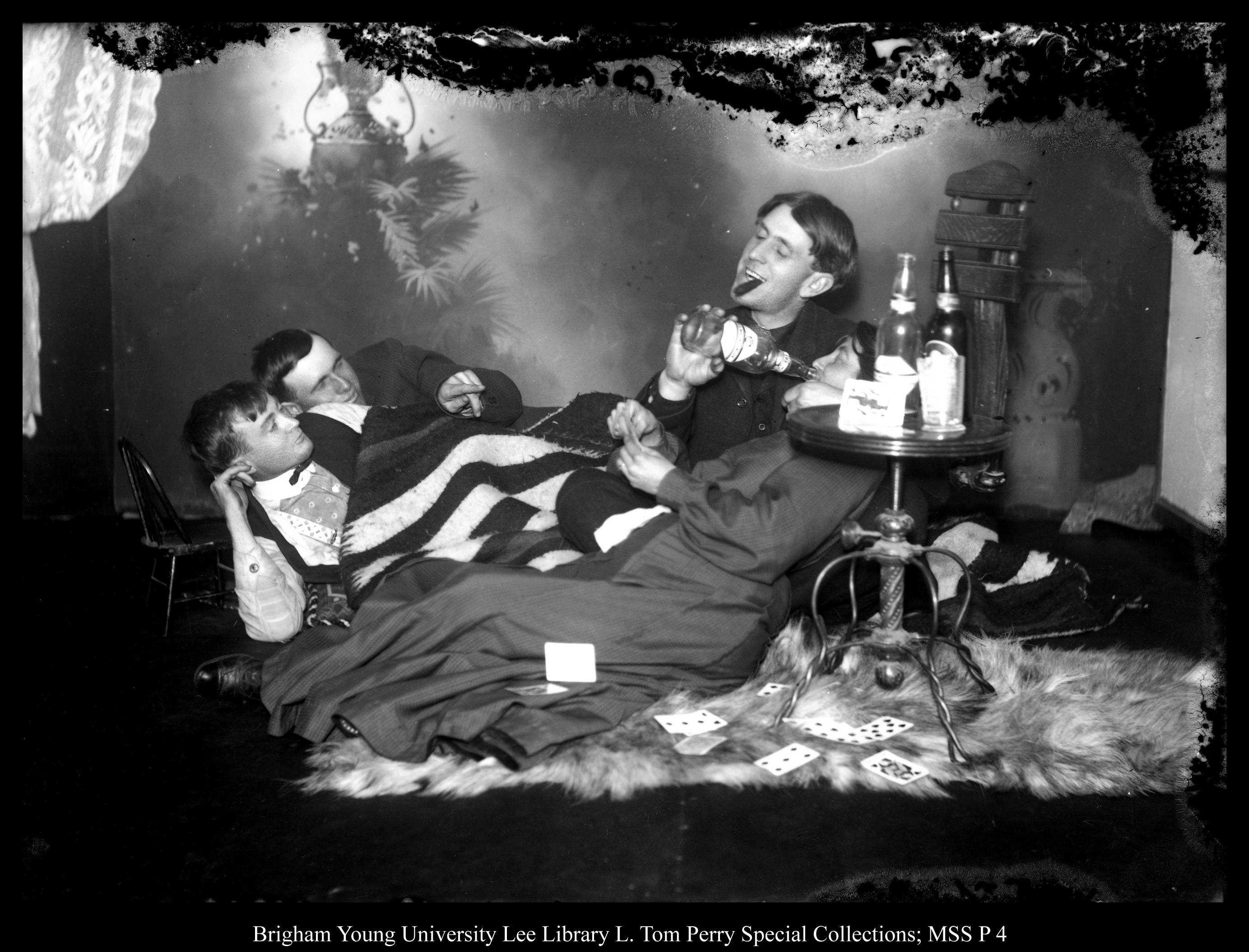
Photo taken by Huntington and Bagley of themselves and two unknown men (Bagley is holding the bottle to Huntington's mouth.)

Around 1939, a few years after Bagley's death, Huntington sold the photography studio.

=== Style ===
Mormon historian Mason Kamana Allred writes that Bagley and Huntington's legacy remains due to their "willingness to confront, starkly at times, the pains and complexities of life." Huntington's work was seen as "unusual" for the time period. Her work consisted of photographs of everyday occurrences such as people in a park and children playing.

Huntington also portrayed more negative aspects of daily life in Springville, such as excessive drinking and fights. Her photos were also more inclusive than the work of other photographers, as her works included a photo of a man with prosthetic legs and one of herself cross-dressing, and she critiqued men's views of women in her work.

== Collections ==
Huntington's work is held in the permanent collections of the Huntington Bagley Collection and the Rell G. Francis Collection at Brigham Young University; the Springville Museum of Art, the Mapleton, Utah Historical Photographs collection, and the Domestic Life Photograph Collection of the Utah State Historical Society among others.

== Personal life ==
At age 68, Huntington married Bagley (then a widower) in May 1936 in a simple ceremony at their studio. Bagley died six weeks after their marriage. Huntington never had any biological children, and chose not to raise Bagley's two children from his previous marriage. She lived in Springville, Utah for her entire life and died at age 80 in 1949. She is buried in the Springville City Cemetery.

In addition to being known for her photography, Huntington was reportedly a skilled dress-maker.

== Selected works ==
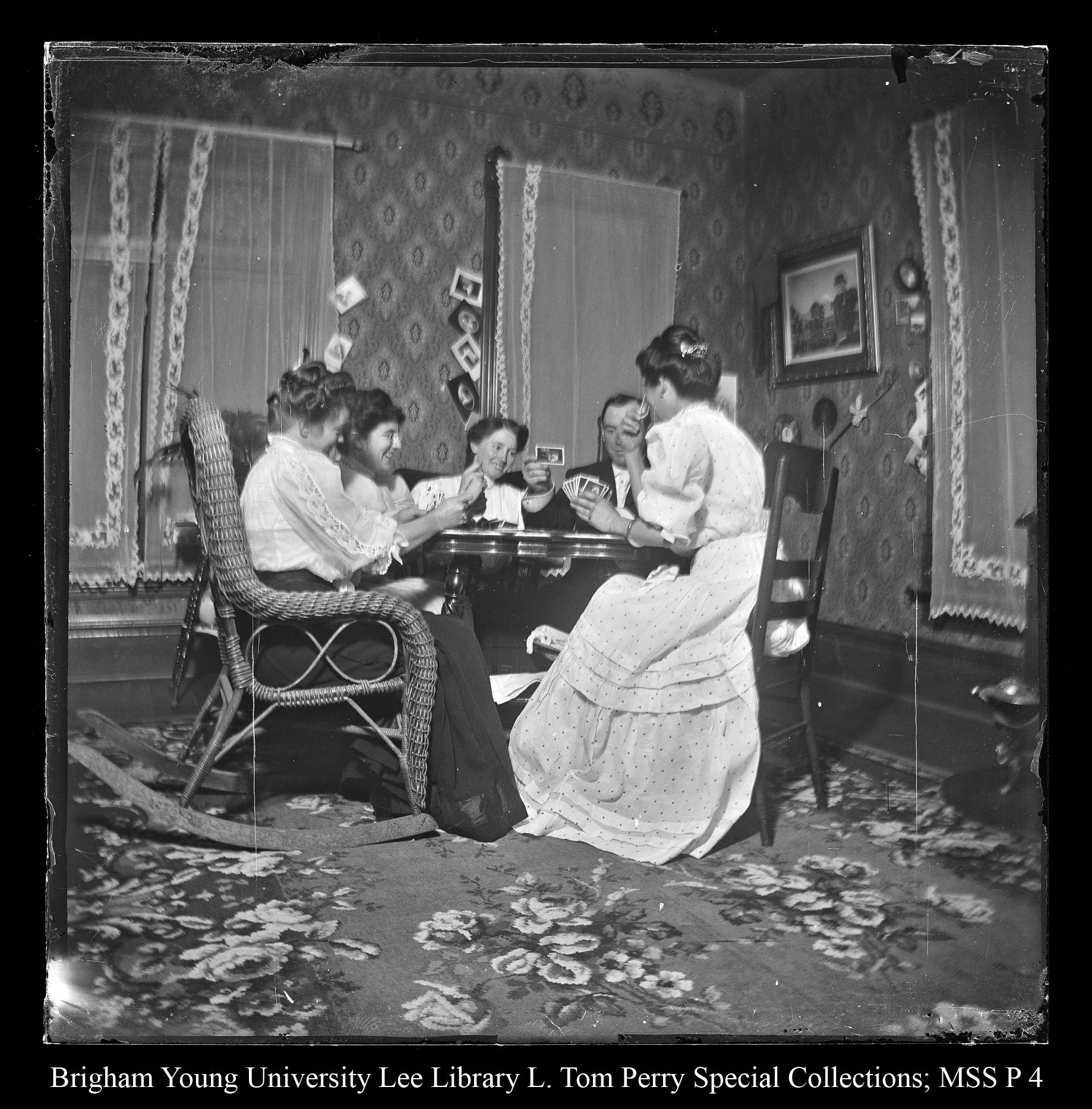

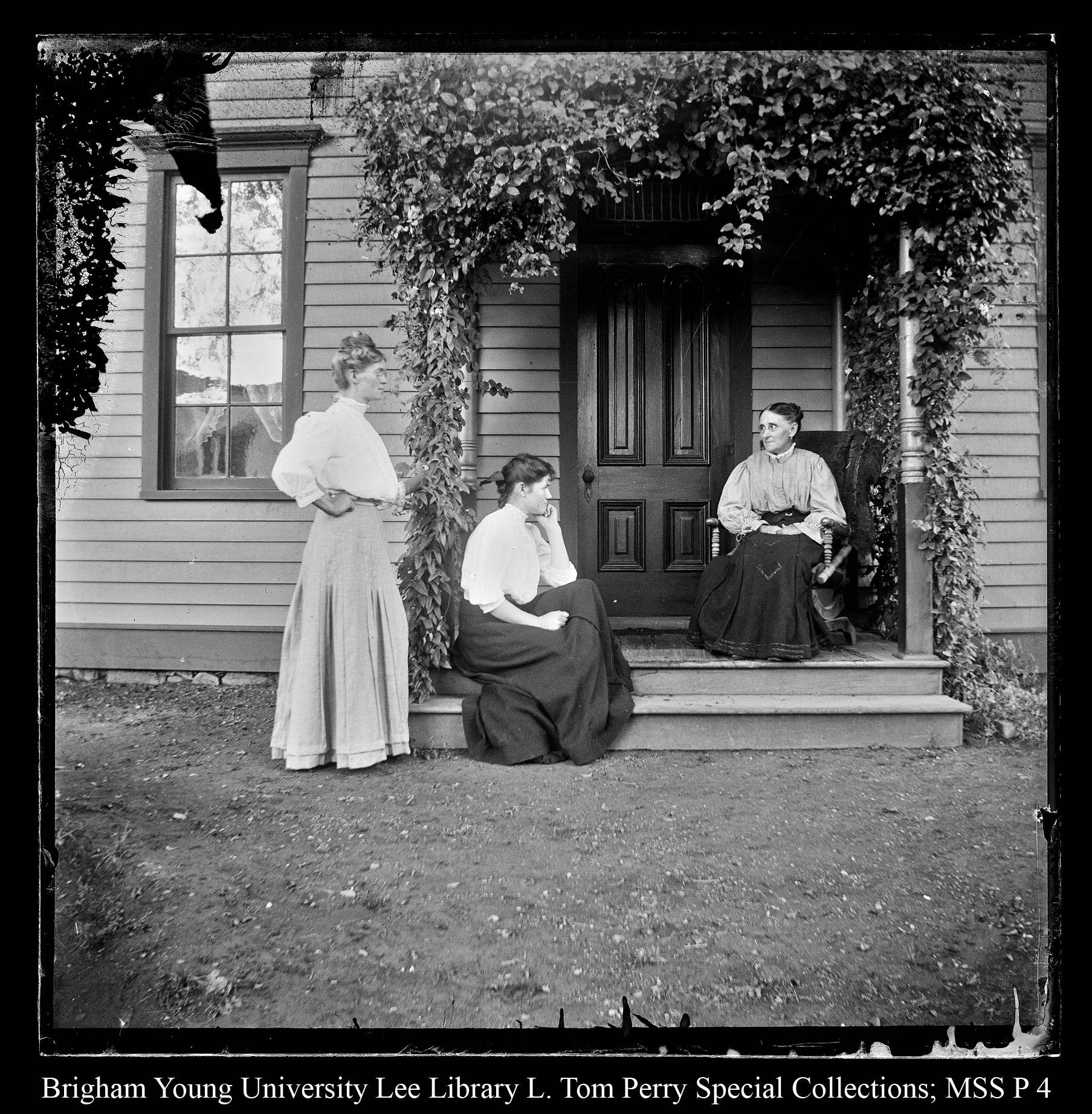

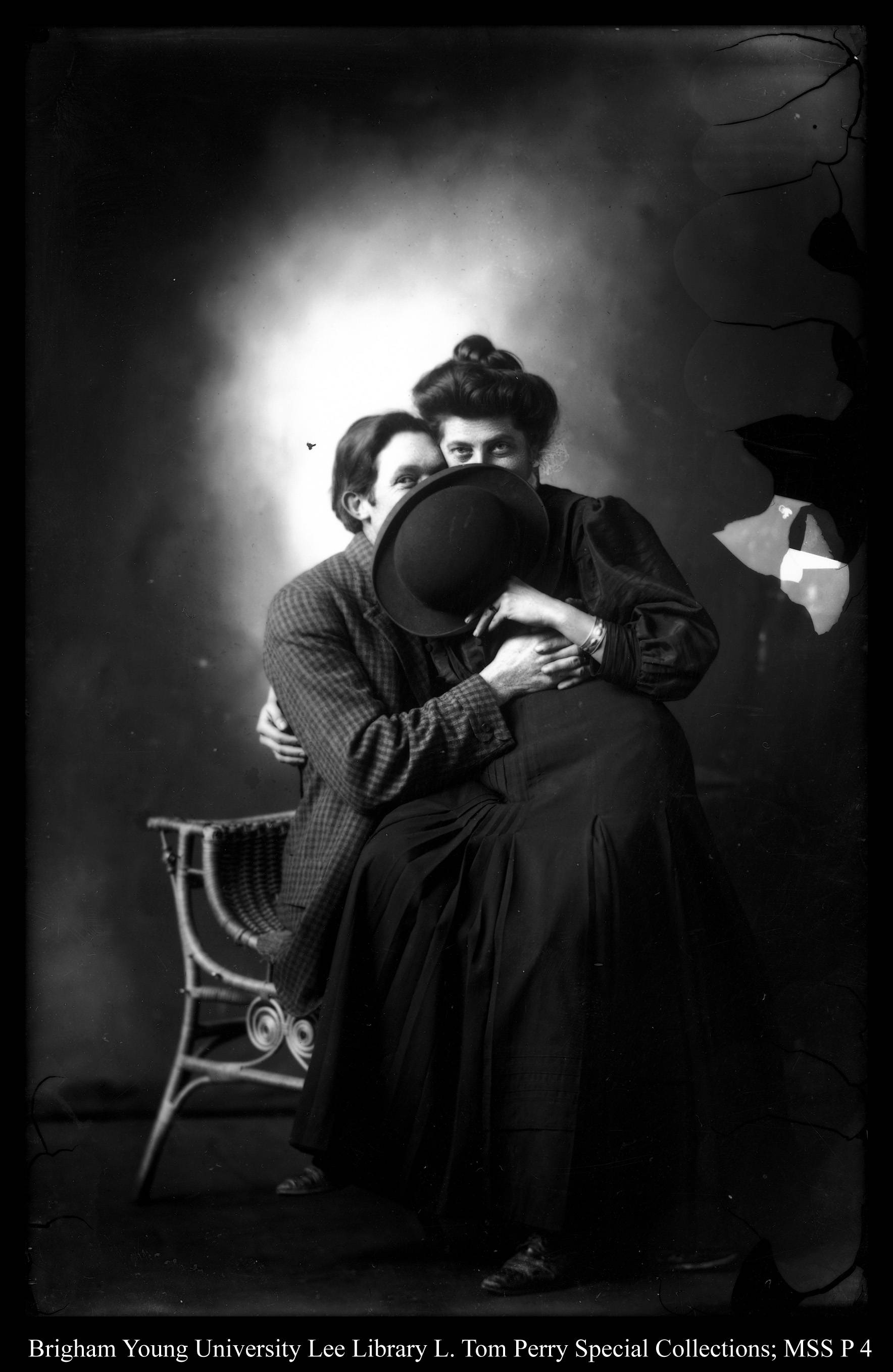

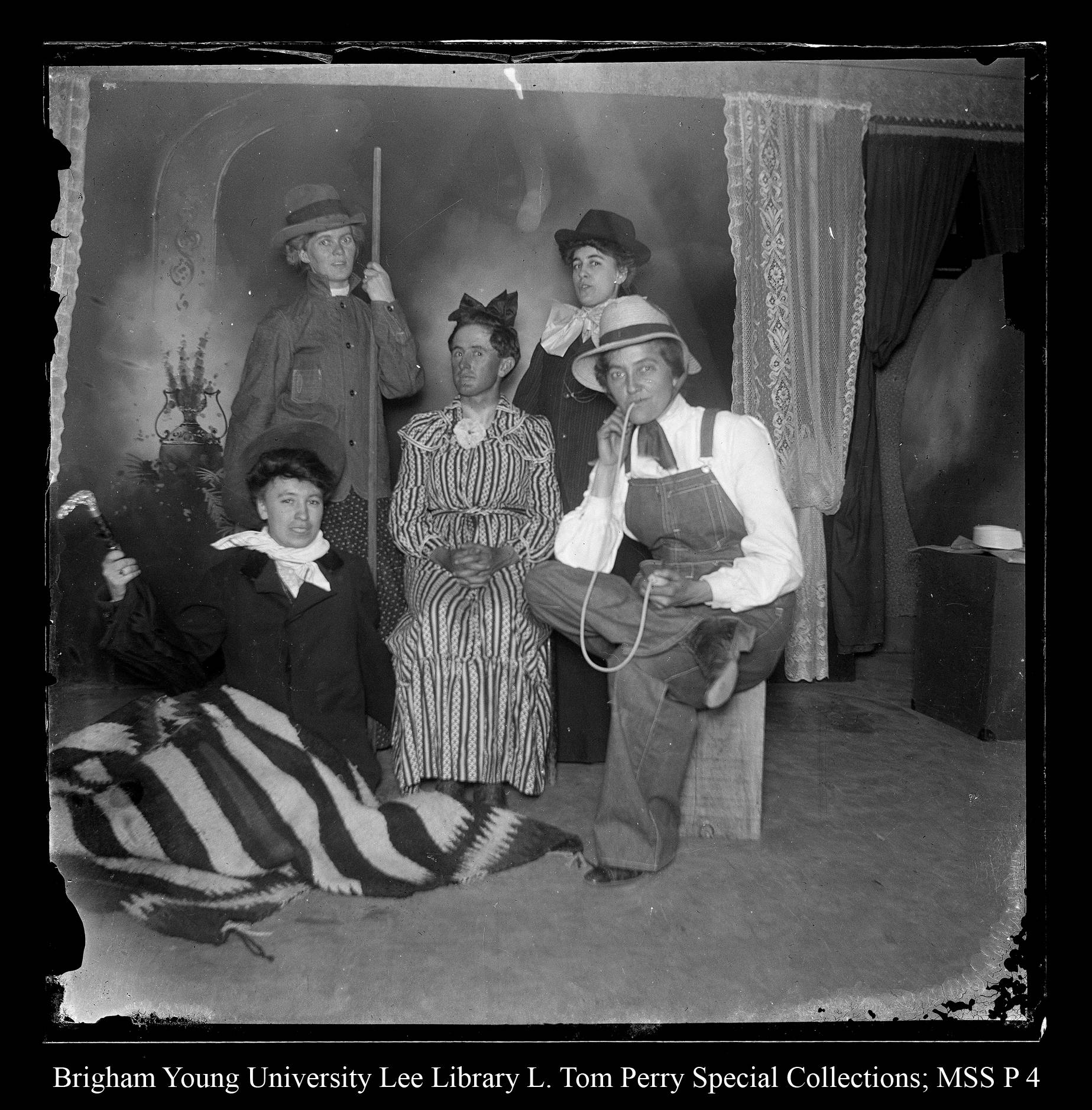
